= List of The Simpsons home video releases =

The Simpsons is an American animated television sitcom created by Matt Groening for Fox. It is a satirical depiction of a middle class American lifestyle epitomized by its eponymous family, which consists of Homer, Marge, Bart, Lisa, and Maggie. The show is set in the fictional town of Springfield, and lampoons American culture, society, and television, as well as many aspects of the human condition. The family was conceived by Groening shortly before a pitch for a series of animated shorts with producer James L. Brooks. Groening created a dysfunctional family and named the characters after members of his own family, substituting Bart for his own name. The shorts became a part of the Fox series The Tracey Ullman Show on April 19, 1987. After a three-season run, the sketch was developed into a half-hour prime-time show that was an early hit for Fox.

Throughout the years, many episodes of the show have been released on VHS, DVD and Blu-ray. When the first season DVD was released in 2001, it quickly became the best-selling television DVD set in history, although it was later overtaken by the first season of Chappelle's Show. The first twenty seasons are available on DVD in Regions 1, 2, and 4, with the twentieth season released on DVD and Blu-ray in 2010 to commemorate the 20th anniversary of the series. However, only the first seventeen seasons were released in Region 3. The Simpsons Movie, a feature-length film, was released in theaters worldwide on July 27, 2007, and was later available on DVD and Blu-ray worldwide on December 3, 2007, and on December 18, 2007, in the U.S.

On April 8, 2015, showrunner Al Jean announced that there would be no more DVD or Blu-ray releases, shifting focus to digital distribution. Two years later, following fan protest, season 18 was released on December 5, 2017, on DVD with the possibility of further seasons if sales were strong enough. Two years later, season 19 was released on DVD on December 3, 2019. Also on December 3, 2019, a limited-edition DVD collection consisting of seasons 1-20, limited to 1,000 units, was released.

== Overview ==
Season	Episodes	DVD release dates				Formats	DVD Discs
Season	Episodes	Region 1	Region 2	Region 3	Region 4	Formats	DVD Discs
1	13	September 25, 2001	September 24, 2001	December 17, 2004	October 3, 2001	DVD	3
2	22	August 6, 2002	July 8, 2002	August 9, 2004	July 24, 2002	DVD	4
3	24	August 26, 2003	October 6, 2003	August 9, 2004	November 12, 2003	DVD	4
4	22	June 15, 2004	August 2, 2004	June 2, 2005	August 25, 2004	DVD	4
5	22	December 21, 2004	March 21, 2005	June 2, 2005	March 23, 2005	DVD	4
6	25	August 16, 2005	October 17, 2005	November 9, 2005	March 29, 2006	DVD	4
7	25	December 13, 2005	January 30, 2006	April 18, 2006	May 10, 2006	DVD	4
8	25	August 15, 2006	October 2, 2006	August 3, 2007	October 11, 2006	DVD	4
9	25	December 19, 2006	January 29, 2007	February 16, 2007	March 21, 2007	DVD	4
10	23	August 7, 2007	September 10, 2007	August 16, 2007	September 26, 2007	DVD	4
11	22	October 7, 2008	October 6, 2008	November 6, 2008	November 5, 2008	DVD	4
12	21	August 18, 2009	September 28, 2009	August 27, 2009	September 2, 2009	DVD	4
13	22	August 24, 2010	September 20, 2010	September 29, 2010	December 1, 2010	DVD & Blu-ray	4
14	22	December 6, 2011	October 10, 2011	January 10, 2013	November 2, 2011	DVD & Blu-ray	4
15	22	December 4, 2012	December 3, 2012	January 10, 2013	December 12, 2012	DVD & Blu-ray	4
16	21	December 3, 2013	December 2, 2013	December 5, 2013	December 11, 2013	DVD & Blu-ray	4
17	22	December 2, 2014	December 1, 2014	January 5, 2015	December 3, 2014	DVD & Blu-ray	4
18	22	December 5, 2017	December 11, 2017		December 13, 2017	DVD	4
Movie		December 18, 2007	December 3, 2007	December 5, 2007	December 5, 2007	DVD, VCD and Blu-ray	1
19	20	December 3, 2019	December 2, 2019		December 11, 2019	DVD	4
20	21	January 12, 2010	September 17, 2010		January 20, 2010	DVD & Blu-ray	3

== Full season sets ==
=== DVD ===
Season	Set details	DVD release dates		Special features
Season	Set details	Region 1	Region 2	Special features
1	Discs: 3; Episodes: 13; 1.33:1 aspect ratio	September 25, 2001	September 24, 2001	Original scripts for "Bart the Genius", "Bart the General", "Moaning Lisa" and "Some Enchanted Evening"; Unaired version of "Some Enchanted Evening"; Albert Brooks outtakes; BBC Special: America's First Family; ABC News: Bart T-shirt Controversy; Tracey Ullman Show short: "Good Night"; Foreign language clips; Photo gallery; AUDIO; English 5.1 Dolby Digital; English 2.0 Dolby Surround; French 2.0 Dolby Surround; SUBTITLES; English SDH; Spanish
2	Discs: 4; Episodes: 22; 1.33:1 aspect ratio	August 6, 2002	July 8, 2002	Bart at the American Music Awards; The Simpsons presenting at the Emmy Awards; "Do the Bartman" and "Deep, Deep Trouble" music videos; Featurette: "Creation of an Episode"; Featurette: "An Interview with Matt Groening and James L. Brooks"; 3 Butterfinger Commercials; Foreign language clips; Photo gallery; AUDIO; English 5.1 Dolby Digital; English 2.0 Dolby Surround; French 2.0 Dolby Surround; SUBTITLES; English SDH; Spanish
3	Discs: 4; Episodes: 24; 1.33:1 aspect ratio	August 26, 2003	October 6, 2003	Trivia tracks for "Colonel Homer"; Storyboards; Easter egg audio outtakes; Multi Language Featurette; Treehouse of Horror II; Czech 2.0 Dolby Surround; Polish 2.0 Dolby Surround; Clip from the 1991 Macy's Thanksgiving Day Parade featuring a balloon of Bart; Jukebox feature; Commercials; AUDIO; English 5.1 Dolby Digital; Spanish 2.0 Dolby Surround; French 2.0 Dolby Surround; SUBTITLES; English SDH; Spanish
4	Discs: 4; Episodes: 22; 1.33:1 aspect ratio	June 15, 2004	August 2, 2004	Deleted scenes; Special Language Feature; Kamp Krusty; Portuguese 2.0 Dolby Surround; Japanese 2.0 Dolby Surround; Italian 2.0 Dolby Surround; Castilian Spanish 2.0 Dolby Surround; Featurettes; Animatic/Storyboards; Featurette: "The Cajun Controversy"; Featurette: "Bush v. Simpsons"; Commercials; AUDIO; English 5.1 Dolby Digital; Spanish 2.0 Dolby Surround; French 2.0 Dolby Surround; SUBTITLES; English SDH; Spanish
5	Discs: 4; Episodes: 22; 1.33:1 aspect ratio	December 21, 2004	March 21, 2005	Animation Showcases; "A Look Back" with James L. Brooks; Commercials; Special Language Feature; Sweet Seymour Skinner's Baadasssss Song; Czech 2.0 Dolby Surround; Polish 2.0 Dolby Surround; Hungarian 2.0 Dolby Surround; Italian 2.0 Dolby Surround; Deleted scenes; Audio outtakes; Original sketches; AUDIO; English 5.1 Dolby Digital; Spanish 2.0 Dolby Surround; French 2.0 Dolby Surround; SUBTITLES; English SDH; Spanish
6	Featured character: Homer; Discs: 4; Episodes: 25; 1.33:1 aspect ratio	August 16, 2005	October 17, 2005	Animatics; Deleted scenes; Special Language Feature; Who Shot Mr. Burns? - Part One; Parisian French 2.0 Dolby Surround; Castilian Spanish 2.0 Dolby Surround; Czech 2.0 Dolby Surround; Russian 2.0 Dolby Surround; Sketch gallery: "Who Shot Mr Burns" Suspect Profiles; TV Special: "Springfields Most Wanted"; Featurette: The Simpsons Plane; Commercials; AUDIO; English 5.1 Dolby Digital; Spanish 2.0 Dolby Surround; French 2.0 Dolby Surround; SUBTITLES; English SDH; Spanish
7	Featured character: Marge; Discs: 4; Episodes: 25; 1.33:1 aspect ratio	December 13, 2005	January 30, 2006	Deleted scenes; Special Language Feature; 22 Short Films of Springfield; Portuguese 2.0 Dolby Surround; German 2.0 Dolby Surround; Italian 2.0 Dolby Surround; Japanese 2.0 Dolby Surround; Special "3D Homer" featurette; Paul McCartney's Lentil Soup recipe; Animatic/Storyboards; Sketch gallery; AUDIO; English 5.1 Dolby Digital; Spanish 2.0 Dolby Surround; French 2.0 Dolby Surround; SUBTITLES; English SDH; Spanish
8	Featured character: Maggie; Discs 4; Episodes: 25; 1.33:1 aspect ratio	August 15, 2006	October 2, 2006	Deleted scenes; Special Language Feature; Homer's Enemy; Czech 2.0 Dolby Surround; Japanese 2.0 Dolby Surround; German 2.0 Dolby Surround; Parisian French 2.0 Dolby Surround; Featurette: "The Simpsons House"; Animation showcases for "Treehouse of Horror VII", "In Marge We Trust" and "The Secret War of Lisa Simpson"; Original sketches; Promos; AUDIO; English 5.1 Dolby Digital; Spanish 2.0 Dolby Surround; French 2.0 Dolby Surround; SUBTITLES; English SDH; Spanish
9	Featured character: Lisa; Discs: 4; Episodes: 25; 1.33:1 aspect ratio	December 19, 2006	January 29, 2007	Deleted scenes; Special Language Feature; Trash of the Titans; Polish 2.0 Dolby Surround; Portuguese 2.0 Dolby Surround; German 2.0 Dolby Surround; Japanese 2.0 Dolby Surround; Animation showcases; Illustrated commentary: "All Singing, All Dancing" and "Lost Our Lisa"; Sneak peek at The Simpsons Movie; Commercials; Sketch gallery; AUDIO; English 5.1 Dolby Digital; Spanish 2.0 Dolby Surround; French 2.0 Dolby Surround; SUBTITLES; English SDH; Spanish
10	Featured character: Bart; Discs: 4; Episodes: 23; 1.33:1 aspect ratio	August 7, 2007	September 10, 2007	Deleted scenes; Special Language Feature; Sunday, Cruddy Sunday; Czech 2.0 Dolby Surround; Portuguese 2.0 Dolby Surround; Japanese 2.0 Dolby Surround; Ukrainian 2.0 Dolby Surround; Animation showcases; Sneak peek at The Simpsons Movie DVD; Commercials; Sketch gallery; Featurettes; AUDIO; English 5.1 Dolby Digital; Spanish 2.0 Dolby Surround; French 2.0 Dolby Surround; SUBTITLES; English SDH; Spanish
11	Featured character: Krusty; Discs: 4; Episodes: 22; 1.33:1 aspect ratio	October 7, 2008	October 6, 2008	Deleted scenes; Special Language Feature; Beyond Blunderdome; Portuguese 2.0 Dolby Surround; Czech 2.0 Dolby Surround; German 2.0 Dolby Surround; Italian 2.0 Dolby Surround; Featurettes; Extra: "And Then There Were Menus"; Sketch gallery; Animation showcases; AUDIO; English 5.1 Dolby Digital; Spanish 2.0 Dolby Surround; French 2.0 Dolby Surround; SUBTITLES; English SDH; Spanish
12	Featured character: Comic Book Guy; Discs: 4; Episodes: 21; 1.33:1 aspect ratio	August 18, 2009	September 28, 2009	Deleted scenes; Special Language Feature; Homer vs. Dignity; Portuguese 2.0 Dolby Surround; Hungarian 2.0 Dolby Surround; Ukrainian 2.0 Dolby Surround; Italian 2.0 Dolby Surround; Featurettes; Commercials; Sketch gallery; Animation showcases; AUDIO; English 5.1 Dolby Digital; Spanish 2.0 Dolby Surround; French 2.0 Dolby Surround; SUBTITLES; English SDH; Spanish
13	Featured character: Ralph; Discs: 4; Episodes: 22; 1.33:1 aspect ratio	August 24, 2010	September 20, 2010	Animation showcases; Deleted scenes; Special Language Feature; Treehouse of Horror XII; Portuguese 2.0 Dolby Surround; Czech 2.0 Dolby Surround; Japanese 2.0 Dolby Surround; German 2.0 Dolby Surround; Commercials; Featurettes; Sketch galleries; AUDIO; English 5.1 Dolby Digital; Spanish 2.0 Dolby Surround; French 2.0 Dolby Surround; SUBTITLES; English SDH; Spanish
14	Featured character: Kang; Discs: 4; Episodes: 22; 1.33:1 aspect ratio	December 6, 2011	October 10, 2011	Animation showcases; Special Language Feature; Three Gays and the Condo; Portuguese 2.0 Dolby Surround; Czech 2.0 Dolby Surround; German 2.0 Dolby Surround; Italian 2.0 Dolby Surround; Deleted scenes; Featurettes; Sketch galleries; AUDIO; English 5.1 Dolby Digital; Spanish 2.0 Dolby Surround; French 2.0 Dolby Surround; SUBTITLES; English SDH; Spanish
15	Featured character: Otto; Discs: 4; Episodes: 22; 1.33:1 aspect ratio	December 4, 2012	December 3, 2012	Animation showcases; Deleted scenes; Commercials; Special Language Feature; My Big Fat Geek Wedding; Portuguese 2.0 Dolby Surround; German 2.0 Dolby Surround; Italian 2.0 Dolby Surround; Ukrainian 2.0 Dolby Surround; Featurettes; Sketch galleries; AUDIO; English 5.1 Dolby Digital; Spanish 2.0 Dolby Surround; French 2.0 Dolby Surround; SUBTITLES; English SDH; Spanish
16	Featured character: Professor Frink; Discs: 4; Episodes: 21; 1.33:1 aspect ratio	December 3, 2013	December 2, 2013	Animation showcases; Deleted scenes; Special Language Feature; Pranksta Rap; Czech 2.0 Dolby Surround; Italian 2.0 Dolby Surround; Portuguese 2.0 Dolby Surround; Hungarian 2.0 Dolby Surround; Featurettes; Bonus Episode; Holidays of Future Passed; Sketch galleries; AUDIO; English 5.1 Dolby Digital; Spanish 2.0 Dolby Surround; French 2.0 Dolby Surround; SUBTITLES; English SDH; Spanish
17	Featured character: Sideshow Bob; Discs: 4; Episodes: 22; 1.33:1 aspect ratio	December 2, 2014	December 1, 2014	Buongiorno, Simpsons Lovers; Audio Commentary On Every Episode With Writers, Actors And Directors; Deleted Scenes With Commentary; The Great Ones; Let There Be Music; Live! It's The Simpsons; Bonus Episode; The Man Who Grew Too Much; Multi-angle Animation Showcase; Special Language Feature; Homer Simpson, This Is Your Wife; Hungarian 2.0 Dolby Surround; Ukrainian 2.0 Dolby Surround; German 2.0 Dolby Surround; Italian 2.0 Dolby Surround; Original Sketches; AUDIO; English 5.1 Dolby Digital; Spanish 2.0 Dolby Surround; French 2.0 Dolby Surround; SUBTITLES; English SDH; Spanish; Note: This is the first season to receive a 15 rating in the UK although this was due to the bonus features and not the episodes.
18	Featured character: Fat Tony; Discs: 4; Episodes: 22; 1.33:1 aspect ratio	December 5, 2017	December 11, 2017	Welcome Back, Loyal Fans!; Audio Commentary On All Episodes With Writers, Actors and Directors; Deleted Scenes With Commentary (Only on Disc 4); Bonus Episode; 22 for 30; Multi-Angle Animation Showcase; Special Language Feature; The Mook, The Chef, The Wife and her Homer; Czech 2.0 Dolby Surround; German 2.0 Dolby Surround; Italian 2.0 Dolby Surround; Hungarian 2.0 Dolby Surround; A Conversation With Fat Tony; AUDIO; English 5.1 Dolby Digital; Spanish 2.0 Dolby Surround; French 2.0 Dolby Surround; SUBTITLES; English SDH; Spanish
The Simpsons Movie	Discs: 1; Widescreen Edition 2.40:1 aspect ratio; Full Screen Edition 1.33:1 aspect ratio	December 18, 2007	December 3, 2007	Audio commentary by James L. Brooks, Matt Groening, Al Jean, Mike Scully, David Silverman, Dan Castellaneta and Yeardley Smith.; Audio commentary of the directors by David Silverman, Mike B. Anderson, Steven Dean Moore and Rich Moore.; Deleted scenes; Trailers; Image Galleries; AUDIO; English 5.1 Dolby Digital; English 5.1 DTS; Spanish 2.0 Dolby Surround; French 2.0 Dolby Surround; SUBTITLES; English SDH; Spanish
19	Featured character: Homer; Discs: 4; Episodes: 20; 1.33:1 aspect ratio	December 3, 2019	December 2, 2019	Optional commentaries for all 20 episodes; Introduction ("A Plea for Sanity") with Matt Groening; Special Language Feature; Eternal Moonshine of the Simpson Mind; Parisian French 2.0 Dolby Surround; Portuguese 2.0 Dolby Surround; Italian 2.0 Dolby Surround; Hungarian 2.0 Dolby Surround; Featurette: "Thank You"; AUDIO; English 5.1 Dolby Digital; Spanish 2.0 Dolby Surround; French 2.0 Dolby Surround; SUBTITLES; English SDH; Spanish
20	Discs: 4; Episodes: 21; 1.33:1 aspect ratio (episodes 1–9); 1.78:1 aspect ratio (episodes 10–21)	January 12, 2010	September 17, 2010	Hand-drawn menus by Matt Groening; Sneak peek at The 20th Anniversary Special (US DVD only); AUDIO; English 5.1 Dolby Digital; Spanish 2.0 Dolby Surround; French 2.0 Dolby Surround; Portuguese 2.0 Dolby Surround; SUBTITLES; English SDH; Spanish; Portuguese

=== Blu-ray ===
Season	Set details	Blu-ray release dates		Special features
Season	Set details	Region A	Region B	Special features
13	Featured character: Ralph; Discs: 3; Episodes: 22; 1.33:1 aspect ratio	August 24, 2010	September 20, 2010	Animation showcases; Deleted scenes; Special Language Feature; Treehouse of Horror XII; Portuguese 2.0 Dolby Surround; Czech 2.0 Dolby Surround; Japanese 2.0 Dolby Surround; German 2.0 Dolby Surround; Featurettes; Sketch galleries; AUDIO; English 5.1 DTS HD Master Audio; Spanish 5.1 Dolby Digital; French 5.1 Dolby Digital; SUBTITLES; English SDH; Spanish
14	Featured character: Kang; Discs: 3; Episodes: 22; 1.33:1 aspect ratio	December 6, 2011	October 10, 2011	Animation showcases; Deleted scenes; Special Language Feature; Three Gays and the Condo; Portuguese 2.0 Dolby Surround; Czech 2.0 Dolby Surround; German 2.0 Dolby Surround; Italian 2.0 Dolby Surround; Featurettes; Sketch galleries; Bonus Treehouse of Horror episodes: V, VI; AUDIO; English 5.1 DTS HD Master Audio; Spanish 5.1 Dolby Digital; French 5.1 Dolby Digital; SUBTITLES; English SDH; Spanish
15	Featured character: Otto; Discs: 3; Episodes: 22; 1.33:1 aspect ratio	December 4, 2012	December 3, 2012	Animation showcases; Deleted scenes; Special Language Feature; My Big Fat Geek Wedding; Portuguese 2.0 Dolby Surround; German 2.0 Dolby Surround; Italian 2.0 Dolby Surround; Ukrainian 2.0 Dolby Surround; Featurettes; Sketch galleries; Bonus Episodes: "The Otto Show", "Das Bus" and "It's a Mad, Mad, Mad, Mad Marge"; AUDIO; English 5.1 DTS HD Master Audio; Spanish 5.1 Dolby Digital; French 5.1 Dolby Digital; SUBTITLES; English SDH; Spanish
16	Featured character: Professor Frink; Discs: 3; Episodes: 21; 1.33:1 aspect ratio	December 3, 2013	December 2, 2013	Animation showcases; Deleted scenes; Special Language Feature; Pranksta Rap; Czech 2.0 Dolby Surround; Italian 2.0 Dolby Surround; Portuguese 2.0 Dolby Surround; Hungarian 2.0 Dolby Surround; Featurettes; Sketch galleries; Bonus Episodes: "Lisa's Wedding", "Bart to the Future" and "Holidays of Future Passed"; AUDIO; English 5.1 DTS HD Master Audio; Spanish 5.1 Dolby Digital; French 5.1 Dolby Digital; SUBTITLES; English SDH; Spanish
17	Featured character: Sideshow Bob; Discs: 3; Episodes: 22; 1.33:1 aspect ratio	December 2, 2014	December 1, 2014	Buongiorno, Simpsons Lovers; Sketch gallery 1 & 2; Bonus Episodes: "Krusty Gets Busted", "Cape Feare", "The Man Who Grew Too Much"; Deleted Scenes; Special Language Feature; Homer Simpson, This Is Your Wife; Hungarian 2.0 Dolby Surround; Ukrainian 2.0 Dolby Surround; German 2.0 Dolby Surround; Italian 2.0 Dolby Surround; Easter Eggs; Audio Commentary; Let There Be Music; The Great Ones; Animation Showcase; Live! It's The Simpsons; AUDIO; English 5.1 DTS HD Master Audio; Spanish 5.1 Dolby Digital; French 5.1 Dolby Digital; SUBTITLES; English SDH; Spanish
The Simpsons Movie	Discs: 1; 2.39:1 aspect ratio	December 18, 2007	December 3, 2007	Audio Commentary by James L. Brooks, Matt Groening, Al Jean, Mike Scully, David Silverman, Dan Castellaneta and Yeardley Smith.; Audio Commentary of the directors by David Silverman, Mike B. Anderson, Steven Dean Moore and Rich Moore.; Deleted scenes; Trailers; Image Galleries; AUDIO; English 5.1 DTS HD Master Audio; Spanish 5.1 Dolby Digital; French 5.1 Dolby Digital; SUBTITLES; English SDH; Spanish; Cantonese; Korean
20	Discs: 2; Episodes: 21; 1.33:1 aspect ratio (episodes 1–9); 1.78:1 aspect ratio (episodes 10–21)	January 12, 2010	September 17, 2010	Hand-drawn menus by Matt Groening; Sneak peek at The 20th Anniversary Special (US Blu-ray only); AUDIO; English 5.1 DTS HD Master Audio; Spanish 5.1 Dolby Digital; French 5.1 Dolby Digital; Portuguese 5.1 Dolby Digital; SUBTITLES; English SDH; Spanish; Portuguese

== Compilations ==
=== VHS ===
Title	VHS release dates		Episode(s)
Title	Region 1	Region 2	Episode(s)
The Simpsons Collection: Bart the General		October 1, 1991	"Bart the General"; "There's No Disgrace Like Home"
The Simpsons Collection: Call of the Simpsons		October 1, 1991	"The Call of the Simpsons"; "Bart the Genius"
The Simpsons Collection: Life in the Fast Lane		October 1, 1991	"Life on the Fast Lane"; "The Telltale Head"
The Simpsons Collection: Moaning Lisa		October 1, 1991	"Moaning Lisa"; "Homer's Odyssey"
The Simpsons Christmas Special	October 24, 1991		"Simpsons Roasting on an Open Fire"
The Simpsons Collection: Homer's Night Out		October 12, 1992	"Homer's Night Out"; "The Crepes of Wrath"
The Simpsons Collection: Krusty Gets Busted		October 12, 1992	"Krusty Gets Busted"; "Some Enchanted Evening"
The Simpsons Collection: The Simpsons Christmas Special		October 12, 1992	"Simpsons Roasting on an Open Fire"; "Bart Gets an 'F'"
The Simpsons Collection: Treehouse of Horror		October 12, 1992	"Treehouse of Horror"; "Simpson and Delilah"
The Simpsons Collection: Two Cars in Every Garage		October 11, 1993	"Two Cars in Every Garage and Three Eyes on Every Fish"; "Brush with Greatness"
The Simpsons Collection: War of the Simpsons		October 11, 1993	"The War of the Simpsons"; "Lisa's Substitute"
The Simpsons Collection: Dancin' Homer		March 1, 1994	"Dancin' Homer"; "Old Money"
The Simpsons Collection: 3 Men And A Comic Book		March 1, 1994	"Three Men and a Comic Book"; "Blood Feud"
The Simpsons Collection: Dead Putting Society		May 1, 1995	"Dead Putting Society"; "Oh Brother, Where Art Thou?"
The Simpsons Collection: Mr. Lisa Goes to Washington		May 1, 1995	"Mr. Lisa Goes to Washington"; "Separate Vocations"
The Dark Secrets of The Simpsons		April 28, 1997	"The Springfield Files"; "Homer the Great"; "Lisa the Iconoclast"; "Homer Badman"
The Best of The Simpsons: Volume 1	September 16, 1997		"There's No Disgrace Like Home"; "Life on the Fast Lane"; "Family Portrait" (short)
The Best of The Simpsons: Volume 2	September 16, 1997		"Bart the General"; "Moaning Lisa"; "The Funeral" (short)
The Best of The Simpsons: Volume 3	September 16, 1997		"The Crepes of Wrath"; "Krusty Gets Busted"; "The Aquarium" (short)
The Best of The Simpsons: Volume 4	February 3, 1998		"Treehouse of Horror"; "Bart Gets an 'F'"; "Bart's Haircut" (short)
The Best of The Simpsons: Volume 5	February 3, 1998		"Two Cars in Every Garage and Three Eyes on Every Fish"; "Bart vs. Thanksgiving"; "Scary Movie" (short)
The Best of The Simpsons: Volume 6	February 3, 1998		"Bart the Daredevil"; "Itchy & Scratchy & Marge"; "The Bart Simpson Show" (short)
Sex, Lies and The Simpsons		April 14, 1998	"The Last Temptation of Homer"; "Bart After Dark"; "New Kid on the Block"; "Lisa's Rival"
The Best of The Simpsons: Volume 7	May 26, 1998		"Bart Gets Hit by a Car"; "One Fish, Two Fish, Blowfish, Blue Fish"; "Shut Up Simpsons" (short)
The Best of The Simpsons: Volume 8	May 26, 1998		"The Way We Was"; "Homer vs. Lisa and the 8th Commandment"; "Family Therapy" (short)
The Best of The Simpsons: Volume 9	May 26, 1998		"Three Men and a Comic Book"; "Lisa's Substitute"; "Zoo Story" (short)
The Best of The Simpsons: Volume 10	April 13, 1999		"Mr. Lisa Goes to Washington"; "When Flanders Failed"; "Burp Contest" (short)
The Best of The Simpsons: Volume 11	April 13, 1999		"Bart the Murderer"; "Like Father, Like Clown"; "Grampa and the Kids" (short)
The Best of The Simpsons: Volume 12	April 13, 1999		"Treehouse of Horror II"; "Lisa's Pony"; "Making Faces" (short)
Springfield Murder Mysteries		October 1, 1999	"Who Shot Mr. Burns? (Part One)"; "Who Shot Mr. Burns? (Part Two)"; "Black Widower"; "Cape Feare"
Crime and Punishment		October 1, 1999	"Marge in Chains"; "Homer the Vigilante"; "You Only Move Twice"; "Bart the Fink"
The Last Temptation of Homer		October 1, 1999	"Simpson and Delilah"; "One Fish, Two Fish, Blowfish, Blue Fish"; "Homer Alone"; "Colonel Homer"
Too Hot for TV		October 1, 1999	"Treehouse of Horror IX"; "The Cartridge Family"; "Natural Born Kissers"; "Grampa vs. Sexual Inadequacy"
The Simpsons Go to Hollywood		October 1, 1999	"Homer to the Max"; "Fear of Flying"; "Krusty Gets Kancelled"; "Flaming Moe's"
Bart Wars: The Simpsons Strike Back		October 1, 1999	"Mayored to the Mob"; "Dog of Death"; "The Secret War of Lisa Simpson"; "Marge Be Not Proud"
Greatest Hits		November 8, 1999	"Simpsons Roasting on an Open Fire"; "Sweet Seymour Skinner's Baadasssss Song"; "Trash of the Titans"; "Bart Gets an 'F'"; "Lisa's First Word"
The Simpsons: Year One		November 29, 1999	TAPE ONE; "Simpsons Roasting on an Open Fire"; "Bart the Genius"; "Homer's Odyssey"; "There's No Disgrace Like Home"; TAPE TWO; "Bart the General"; "Moaning Lisa"; "The Call of the Simpsons"; "The Telltale Head"; TAPE THREE; "Life on the Fast Lane"; "Homer's Night Out"; "The Crepes of Wrath"; "Krusty Gets Busted"; "Some Enchanted Evening"
The Simpsons Against the World		January 10, 2000	"Homer vs. Patty and Selma"; "Marge vs. the Monorail"; "Homer vs. Lisa and the 8th Commandment"; "Bart vs. Australia"
The Simpsons Go Hollywood: Volume I	January 11, 2000		"Marge vs. the Monorail"; "A Streetcar Named Marge"
The Simpsons Go Hollywood: Volume II	January 11, 2000		"Who Shot Mr. Burns? (Part One)"; "Who Shot Mr. Burns? (Part Two)"
The Simpsons Go Hollywood: Volume III	January 11, 2000		"Bart Gets Famous"; "Krusty Gets Kancelled"
Viva Los Simpsons		March 6, 2000	"Homie the Clown"; "$pringfield (or, How I Learned to Stop Worrying and Love Legalized Gambling)"; "Viva Ned Flanders"; "Homer at the Bat"
The Simpsons Political Party: Volume I	May 9, 2000		"Sideshow Bob Roberts"; "Trash of the Titans"
The Simpsons Political Party: Volume II	May 9, 2000		"Two Bad Neighbors"; "Duffless"
The Simpsons Political Party: Volume III	May 9, 2000		"I Love Lisa"; "The Trouble with Trillions"
Raiders of the Lost Fridge		June 5, 2000	"Guess Who's Coming to Criticize Dinner?"; "King-Size Homer"; "Burns Verkaufen der Kraftwerk"; "Lisa the Vegetarian"
The Simpsons: Year Two, Part One		June 5, 2000	TAPE ONE; "Bart Gets an 'F'"; "Simpson and Delilah"; "Treehouse of Horror"; "Two Cars in Every Garage and Three Eyes on Every Fish"; TAPE TWO; "Dancin' Homer"; "Dead Putting Society"; "Bart vs. Thanksgiving"; "Bart the Daredevil"; TAPE THREE; "Itchy & Scratchy & Marge"; "Bart Gets Hit by a Car"; "One Fish, Two Fish, Blowfish, Blue Fish"
The Simpsons: Year Two, Part Two		June 5, 2000	TAPE ONE; "The Way We Was"; "Homer vs. Lisa and the 8th Commandment"; "Principal Charming"; "Oh Brother, Where Art Thou?"; TAPE TWO; "Bart's Dog Gets an 'F'"; "Old Money"; "Brush with Greatness"; "Lisa's Substitute"; TAPE THREE; "The War of the Simpsons"; "Three Men and a Comic Book"; "Blood Feud"
On Your Marks, Get Set, D'oh!		September 4, 2000	"Lisa on Ice"; "Faith Off"; "The Homer They Fall"; "Dancin' Homer"
The Simpsons Trick or Treehouse: Halloween	September 5, 2000		"Treehouse of Horror III"; "Treehouse of Horror V"
The Simpsons Trick or Treehouse: Springfield Murder Mysteries	September 5, 2000		"Black Widower"; "Cape Feare"
The Simpsons Trick or Treehouse: Heaven & Hell	September 5, 2000		"Bart Sells His Soul"; "Lisa the Skeptic"
The Simpsons.com		November 27, 2000	"Das Bus"; "Itchy & Scratchy Land"; "Homer Goes to College"; "Treehouse of Horror X"
Love, Springfield Style		June 25, 2001	"Bart's Girlfriend"; "The Two Mrs. Nahasapeemapetilons"; "I'm with Cupid"; "It's a Mad, Mad, Mad, Mad Marge"
Film Festival		April 1, 2002	"A Star is Burns"; "22 Short Films About Springfield"; "Beyond Blunderdome"; "Itchy & Scratchy: The Movie"
Backstage Pass		May 20, 2002	"Homer's Barbershop Quartet"; "A Tale of Two Springfields"; "The Otto Show"; "Homerpalooza"
Treehouse of Horror		October 28, 2002	"Treehouse of Horror V"; "Treehouse of Horror VI"; "Treehouse of Horror VII"; "Treehouse of Horror XII"
Heaven and Hell		December 30, 2002	"Bart Sells His Soul"; "In Marge We Trust"; "Treehouse of Horror IV"; "Homer the Heretic"
Risky Business		April 7, 2003	"Homer the Smithers"; "Marge Gets a Job"; "Realty Bites"; "Deep Space Homer"
The Simpsons: The Complete Third Season		October 6, 2003	TAPE ONE; "Stark Raving Dad"; "Mr. Lisa Goes to Washington"; "When Flanders Failed"; "Bart the Murderer"; "Homer Defined"; "Like Father, Like Clown"; TAPE TWO; "Treehouse of Horror II"; "Lisa's Pony"; "Saturdays of Thunder"; "Flaming Moe's"; "Burns Verkaufen der Kraftwerk"; "I Married Marge"; TAPE THREE; "Radio Bart"; "Lisa the Greek"; "Homer Alone"; "Bart the Lover"; "Homer at the Bat"; "Separate Vocations"; TAPE FOUR; "Dog of Death"; "Colonel Homer"; "Black Widower"; "The Otto Show"; "Bart's Friend Falls in Love"; "Brother, Can You Spare Two Dimes?"
Christmas with the Simpsons		October 14, 2003	"Simpsons Roasting on an Open Fire"; "Mr. Plow"; "Miracle on Evergreen Terrace"; "Grift of the Magi"; "She of Little Faith"
Gone Wild		June 7, 2004	"Homer's Night Out"; "Sunday, Cruddy Sunday"; "The Mansion Family"; "Homer the Moe"
Christmas 2		October 25, 2004	"Homer vs. Dignity"; "Skinner's Sense of Snow"; "Dude, Where's My Ranch?"; "'Tis the Fifteenth Season"

=== DVD ===
Title	DVD release dates		Episode(s)
Title	Region 1	Region 2	Episode(s)
Film Festival		April 1, 2002	"Itchy & Scratchy: The Movie"; "A Star Is Burns"; "22 Short Films About Springfield"; "Beyond Blunderdome"
Backstage Pass		May 20, 2002	"A Tale of Two Springfields"; "Homerpalooza"; "Homer's Barbershop Quartet"; "The Otto Show"
Treehouse of Horror	September 2, 2003	October 28, 2002	"Treehouse of Horror V"; "Treehouse of Horror VI"; "Treehouse of Horror VII"; "Treehouse of Horror XII"
Risky Business		April 7, 2003	"Realty Bites"; "Homer the Smithers"; "Deep Space Homer"; "Marge Gets a Job"
Bart Wars	May 17, 2005	September 8, 2003	"Dog of Death"; "Marge Be Not Proud"; "The Secret War of Lisa Simpson"; "Mayored to the Mob"
The Dark Secrets of The Simpsons		September 8, 2003	"Homer to the Max"; "The Springfield Files"; "Lisa the Iconoclast"; "Homer Badman"
Greatest Hits		September 8, 2003	"Simpsons Roasting on an Open Fire"; "Bart Gets an 'F'"; "Lisa's First Word"; "Sweet Seymour Skinner's Baadasssss Song"; "Trash of the Titans"
The Simpsons Go to Hollywood		September 8, 2003	"When You Dish Upon a Star"; "Fear of Flying"; "Krusty Gets Kancelled"; "Flaming Moe's"
Too Hot for TV		September 8, 2003	"Treehouse of Horror IX"; "Grampa vs. Sexual Inadequacy"; "Natural Born Kissers"; "The Cartridge Family"
Christmas	October 14, 2003	November 3, 2003	"Simpsons Roasting on an Open Fire"; "Mr. Plow"; "Miracle on Evergreen Terrace"; "Grift of the Magi"; "She of Little Faith"
Gone Wild	September 14, 2004	June 4, 2004	"Homer's Night Out"; "Sunday, Cruddy Sunday"; "The Mansion Family"; "Homer the Moe"
The Simpsons Against the World		August 16, 2004	"Homer vs. Lisa and the 8th Commandment"; "Marge vs. the Monorail"; "Bart vs. Australia"; "Homer vs. Patty and Selma"
Heaven and Hell		August 16, 2004	"Homer the Heretic"; "Treehouse of Horror IV"; "Bart Sells His Soul"; "In Marge We Trust"
On Your Marks, Get Set, D'oh!		August 16, 2004	"Faith Off"; "The Homer They Fall"; "Lisa on Ice"; "Dancin' Homer"
Sex, Lies and The Simpsons		August 16, 2004	"New Kid on the Block"; "The Last Temptation of Homer"; "Lisa's Rival"; "Bart After Dark"
The Simpsons.com		August 16, 2004	"Treehouse of Horror X"; "Itchy & Scratchy Land"; "Das Bus"; "Homer Goes to College"
Christmas 2	November 2, 2004	October 25, 2004	"Homer vs. Dignity"; "Skinner's Sense of Snow"; "Dude, Where's My Ranch?"; "'Tis the Fifteenth Season"
Crime and Punishment		April 18, 2005	"Marge in Chains"; "Homer the Vigilante"; "Bart the Fink"; "You Only Move Twice"
Springfield Murder Mysteries		April 18, 2005	"Black Widower"; "Cape Feare"; "Who Shot Mr. Burns? (Part One)"; "Who Shot Mr. Burns? (Part Two)"
Raiders of the Lost Fridge		April 18, 2005	"Burns Verkaufen der Kraftwerk"; "Lisa the Vegetarian"; "King-Size Homer"; "Guess Who's Coming to Criticize Dinner?"
Viva Los Simpsons		April 18, 2005	"Homer at the Bat"; "$pringfield (or, How I Learned to Stop Worrying and Love Legalized Gambling)"; "Homie the Clown"; "Viva Ned Flanders"
The Last Temptation of Homer		April 18, 2005	"Simpson and Delilah"; "One Fish, Two Fish, Blowfish, Blue Fish"; "Homer Alone"; "Colonel Homer"
Around the World in 80 D'ohs		July 6, 2005	"Thirty Minutes over Tokyo"; "Simpson Safari"; "Blame It on Lisa"; "The Regina Monologues"
Kiss and Tell: The Story of Their Love	February 7, 2006	February 6, 2006	"Natural Born Kissers"; "Large Marge"; "Three Gays of the Condo"; "The Way We Weren't"
