= Grampa vs. Sexual Inadequacy =

- The Simpsons episode
- Episode no.: Season 6 Episode 10
- Directed by: Wesley Archer
- Written by: Bill Oakley & Josh Weinstein
- Production code: 2F07
- Original air date: December 4, 1994

Guest appearance
- Phil Hartman as Troy McClure

Episode features
- Chalkboard gag: "My homework was not stolen by a one-armed man" (recycled from "Bart Gets Famous")
- Couch gag: The family runs past a repeating background shot of the living room.
- Commentary: David Mirkin; Bill Oakley; Josh Weinstein; Wes Archer

Episode chronology
← Previous "Homer Badman"	Next → "Fear of Flying"
- The Simpsons season 6

"Grampa vs. Sexual Inadequacy" is the tenth episode of the sixth season of the American animated television series The Simpsons. It was first broadcast on Fox in the United States on December 4, 1994. In the episode, Homer and Marge's sex life wanes, so Grampa restores it with a homemade revitalizing tonic. He and Homer travel town-to-town selling the elixir, but they become estranged after Grampa reveals that Homer's conception was unintentional.

The episode was written by Bill Oakley and Josh Weinstein, and directed by Wes Archer. After its initial airing on Fox, the episode was later released as part of a 1999 video collection: The Simpsons – Too Hot For TV, and released again on the 2003 DVD edition of the same collection. The episode features cultural references to songs such as "Foggy Mountain Breakdown" and "Celebration", as well as a reference to the 1963 film The Nutty Professor.

"Grampa vs. Sexual Inadequacy" received a positive reception from television critics, and acquired a Nielsen rating of 9.5.

== Plot ==
When Homer and Marge's sex life fizzles, they seek to spice up their marriage. Homer peruses books like the Kama Sutra, but Marge wants "a tasteful book" so they settle on Mr. and Mrs. Erotic American, a Paul Harvey audiobook. Harvey recommends couples bathe together, but their faucet breaks because the Simpsons' bathtub cannot accommodate Homer and Marge. Next, they try renting a sexy theme room at a hotel, but are forced to sleep in a utility room because the guest rooms are sold out.

Grampa concocts a tonic that he guarantees will put the spark back into their relationship. The elixir works, so Homer and Grampa sell Simpson & Son Revitalizing Tonic to the public in a traveling medicine show. During their travels, they visit the farmhouse where Homer spent his childhood. After they bicker, Grampa angrily tells Homer he is the result of an unplanned pregnancy that would not have happened without the tonic, labeling him as an accident who ruined Abe's life. Homer gasps, stops the car, and demands Grandpa to get out. Grandpa tries to apologize but Homer immediately drives away once he's outside the car.

While their parents are enjoying enhanced sex lives from the tonic, the town's children grow suspicious of their absences during their frequent trysts. Ralph, Milhouse, Bart and their friends hatch conspiracy theories in the Simpsons' treehouse. After Lisa sarcastically suggests parents are going to bed early because they are "reverse vampires" who must avoid nightfall, the other children decide the RAND Corporation is conspiring with space aliens to deprive children of dinner by forcing their parents to retire early.

Unwilling to forgive a deeply remorseful Grampa, Homer resolves to be a better father to Bart, Lisa and Maggie. Bart and Lisa soon realize that smothering them is just as bad as neglecting them. Homer returns to the farmhouse to think. He sees an old photograph of himself as a child on Christmas morning and is sad that his father was not even present when he met Santa Claus. Homer realizes his father was wearing a Santa costume and really does love him. Homer reunites with Grampa, who has also gone to the farmhouse to reflect. They both admit they are screw-ups — each having caused separate fires in the farmhouse — and reconcile as the house burns down behind them.

== Production ==
The episode was directed by Wes Archer, and was written by Bill Oakley and Josh Weinstein. It was originally intended to deal with Homer and Marge's problematic sex life, but later developed into a story about the relationship between Homer and Grampa. Dan Castellaneta provides the voices for both Homer and Grampa. Castellaneta therefore had to talk to himself when he recorded the voices of the two characters in their interactions for this episode. Castellaneta says that it is hard for him to do Grampa's voice for an extended period of time because it is "wheezy and airy".

Homer and Marge spend the night at an inn, called the Aphrodite Inn, to spice up their sex life. The inn was partly based on the Madonna Inn, which, as in the episode, features different kinds of sex-oriented rooms with unusual names that are supposed to spice up a couple's love life. The design of the old farmhouse was inspired by the house featured in the 1993 film Flesh and Bone. Bart's obsession with conspiracy theories was inspired by the writers' observation that children around Bart's age go through a stage where they become "addicted" to information about UFOs and paranormal phenomena. Bill Oakley himself had gone through the same thing when he was around 10 years old.

== Cultural references ==
Al Gore, then-Vice President of the United States, is shown celebrating Lisa's purchase of his book Sane Planning, Sensible Tomorrow by listening to "Celebration" by Kool & the Gang. A parody of The X-Files' theme is played in the background of the scene leading into Gore's celebration. "Foggy Mountain Breakdown" is played during a chase scene, referencing its use in Bonnie and Clyde (1967). When Professor Frink takes the tonic, he transforms into a suave man with a deep voice, a reference to Jerry Lewis transforming into Buddy Love in The Nutty Professor. Grampa, within proper context, successfully pronounces the word pneumonoultramicroscopicsilicovolcanoconiosis. Milhouse quotes JFK (1991): "We’re through the looking glass here, people."

== Reception ==
In its original broadcast, "Grampa vs. Sexual Inadequacy" finished 58th in the ratings for the week of November 28 to December 4, 1994, with a Nielsen rating of 9.5. The episode was the third highest rated show on the Fox network that week.

Gary Russell and Gareth Roberts, the authors of the book I Can't Believe It's a Bigger and Better Updated Unofficial Simpsons Guide, said it was "an amazing episode, in which Homer actually has an argument with someone, rather than backing down. As he and his father drift further apart, so the family are at a loss at what to do. You can't help but feel sorry for Grampa as a piece of Simpson family history goes up in flames".

Nate Meyers for Digitally Obsessed praised Dan Castellaneta's role in the episode and said: "Dan Castellaneta's work as both Homer and Grampa Simpson in [the episode] is full of emotion and brilliant comic timing. Watch the closing scene carefully as Homer returns to his childhood home, because Castellaneta gracefully dances between a tender father-son relationship and flat-out comedy".

Colin Jacobson of DVD Movie Guide said he "didn’t remember this as a very good episode, but it actually turns out to be quite strong. The initial plot in which Homer and Marge can’t get it together offers plenty of funny moments, and the scenes in which Homer battles with his dad offer depth and much humor. It’s also hard to beat the children's fears of the reverse vampires".

== Merchandise ==
The episode was included on a 1999 PAL region VHS release titled "The Simpsons: Too Hot for TV", which included three other episodes that were deemed to be too raunchy for airing on television. It was released on DVD as part of the same compilation in Region 2 in 2003.

It was included in The Simpsons season 6 DVD set, which was released August 16, 2005 – The Simpsons – The Complete Sixth Season.
