= Bart Gets Famous =

- The Simpsons episode
- The episode's promotional image, featuring Bart and Conan O'Brien on the set of Late Night with Conan O'Brien.
- Episode no.: Season 5 Episode 12
- Directed by: Susie Dietter
- Written by: John Swartzwelder
- Production code: 1F11
- Original air date: February 3, 1994

Guest appearance
- Conan O'Brien as himself

Episode features
- Chalkboard gag: "My homework was not stolen by a one-armed man"
- Couch gag: The family collides when running and lands into the couch as one big mass of amorphous glop.
- Commentary: Matt Groening; James L. Brooks; David Mirkin; Conan O'Brien; Susie Dietter; David Silverman

Episode chronology
← Previous "Homer the Vigilante"	Next → "Homer and Apu"
- The Simpsons season 5

"Bart Gets Famous" is the twelfth episode of the fifth season of the American animated television series The Simpsons. It originally aired on the Fox network in the United States on February 3, 1994. In this episode, Bart gets a job as Krusty the Clown's production assistant. He replaces Sideshow Mel in one of Krusty's skits and accidentally destroys the stage props. When Bart says "I didn't do it," he instantly becomes famous for his catchphrase.

This episode was written by John Swartzwelder and directed by Susie Dietter, which was the first episode of the series to be directed by her. Many characters from the show have catchphrases, and the episode mocks the use of catchphrase-based humor. The writers chose the phrase "I didn't do it" because they wanted a "lousy" phrase "to point out how really crummy things can become really popular". Conan O'Brien, a writer for The Simpsons during the fourth and early part of the fifth season, guest-stars as himself. The writers decided to include him in the episode after he received an audition from NBC to replace David Letterman as the host of Late Night.

In its original broadcast, "Bart Gets Famous" finished 40th in ratings with a Nielsen rating of 11.7; it was viewed in 10.74 million households.

== Plot ==
Bored on a class trip to a box factory, Bart escapes to the nearby Channel 6 TV studio, where he encounters Krusty the Clown. Bart swipes a Danish intended for Krusty, who fires his assistant over the missing pastry. Bart steals a Danish from Kent Brockman and gives it to Krusty, who is so grateful that he makes Bart his new assistant.

The cast members treat Bart badly, and he receives no meaningful credit for his work. When they use him as a gofer to deliver their lunches, a lactose-intolerant Sideshow Mel becomes sick. Bart is given an opportunity to be on the show and replaces Mel in a skit, but he accidentally knocks over several stage props. Dumbstruck by the cameras and onlookers, he says, "I didn't do it." The audience erupts with laughter. As Bart and Krusty are leaving the studio, they both realize Bart has instantly become famous. He is now known as "The 'I didn't do it' kid". Krusty claims the rights to Bart and has him appear in more sketches, and his catchphrase is used as a marketing gimmick and a line of merchandise.

Bart at first enjoys the fame, but soon he gets tired of being a one-trick pony and people asking him to "just say the line". During an interview on Late Night with Conan O'Brien, he tries to expand his repertoire, but O'Brien grows impatient and makes him repeat the catchphrase. Bart wants to quit show business, but Marge persuades him to continue performing because he makes people happy. After Bart delivers his catchphrase in another of Krusty's skits, the audience reacts with boredom, so Krusty ditches him.

Marge gives Bart a box of memorabilia to help him remember his brief fame. When Lisa is relieved he is again just her brother instead of "a one-dimensional character with a silly catchphrase", the Simpson family—joined by Barney, Mr. Burns, Ned and Nelson—recite their respective catchphrases. They all expectantly look at Lisa; however, she does not have a catchphrase. Unamused, Lisa says, "If anyone wants me, I'll be in my room." Homer replies, "What kind of a catchphrase is that?"

== Production ==
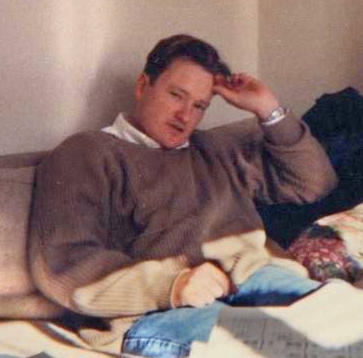
Former writer Conan O'Brien returned to the show to guest-star as himself.

"Bart Gets Famous" was written by John Swartzwelder. The episode satirizes catchphrase-based humor. Many characters from The Simpsons have catchphrases, including Homer ("D'oh!"), Bart ("Eat My Shorts", "¡Ay, caramba!" and "Don't have a cow, man!"), Marge (her worried or annoyed "hmmmm") and Maggie (her pacifier suck). The writers chose the phrase "I didn't do it" because they wanted a "lousy" phrase "to point out how really crummy things can become really popular". It was also an intentional callback to the first-season episode "Krusty Gets Busted" in which it was a catchphrase of Krusty the Clown. The episode ends with a self-referential scene in which several characters say their catchphrases, including the Simpsons, Ned Flanders, Nelson Muntz, Mr. Burns and Barney Gumble. All the characters gather around Lisa and stare at her with an anticipating look, and Lisa, displeased, finishes the episode by muttering "If anyone wants me I'll be in my room", to which Homer says "What kind of a catchphrase is that?"

In the episode, Bart appears on the talk show Late Night with Conan O'Brien. Conan O'Brien was a writer for The Simpsons during the fourth and early part of the fifth seasons. During the production of the episode, he received an audition to replace David Letterman as the host of Late Night on NBC, after Letterman defected to CBS. The writers decided that since the episode featured Bart getting famous, it would give them an opportunity to work in O'Brien's show. The part was written just after O'Brien's audition for Late Night, but before he knew he was going to be the host. O'Brien recorded his part shortly after Late Night with Conan O'Brien premiered, but he believed NBC would have fired him before the episode aired. He described being a guest star on the show as "really delightful", adding that "it's like being frozen in amber. I know people will be watching The Simpsons long after I'm dead."

"Bart Gets Famous" was the first episode of the series to be directed by Susie Dietter. The design of the insides of the box factory featured in this episode was discussed at great length by Dietter and executive creative consultant Brad Bird. Bird wanted the design to be more lively, but Dietter wanted it to be more boring to go with the story. Dietter's design was used in the finished episode. The box factory manager's voice, performed by Dan Castellaneta, was based on Wally Ballou, a character portrayed by Bob Elliott of the comedy duo Bob and Ray. Mayor Quimby's wife Martha makes her first appearance in this episode. Her outfit (a pink dress and a pillbox hat) is similar to the clothing worn by Jacqueline Kennedy Onassis on the day of the Kennedy assassination.

== Cultural references ==
The episode contains a number of self-referential jokes. Bart whistles The Simpsons theme and Marge tells him "not to whistle that annoying tune". Bart tells Krusty "I saved you from jail, I reunited you with your estranged father, I saved your career, man!" After fearing that he has become a one-trick pony, Marge reassures him he is making people happy. Bart reflects that "I'm in television now. It's my job to be repetitive. My job. My job. Repetitiveness is my job. I am going to go out there tonight and give the best performance of my life!" "The best performance of your life?" Marge asks. "The best performance of my life!"

Krusty yells "hey kid" and throws Bart his towel in an homage to the 1979 Coca-Cola commercial "Hey Kid, Catch!". Bart records an "I Didn't Do It" rap with the backing track from MC Hammer's "U Can't Touch This", while MC Hammer himself is in the recording studio calling Bart "propa". This song, in turn, sampled the bass riff from "Super Freak" by Rick James. When Lisa says that Bart got famous due to an 'obnoxious fad', Homer defends him by saying that 'they said the same thing about Urkel'. Bart imagines himself appearing on Match Game in 2034 alongside Billy Crystal, Farrah Fawcett, Loni Anderson, Spike Lee and Kitty Carlisle's head in a jar. Matt Groening would later reuse the idea of heads from dead celebrities living in jars in a future society in Futurama. Lisa notes that the hastily published Bart biography "is mostly about Ross Perot, and the last two chapters are excerpts from the Oliver North trial."

== Reception ==
In its original broadcast, "Bart Gets Famous" aired during the week of January 31 to February 6, 1994, the first week of February sweeps. It finished 40th in ratings with a Nielsen rating of 11.7, and was viewed in 10.74 million households. It was the highest-rated show on Fox that week.

The authors of the book I Can't Believe It's a Bigger and Better Updated Unofficial Simpsons Guide, Gary Russell and Gareth Roberts, wrote: "even without that final sequence, this would still be one of the best episodes, with Bart at his very best. The scenes in the box factory are superb, as is Martin and Skinner's joyful singing and, once again, Edna and Bart's enforced team-up."

DVD Movie Guide's Colin Jacobson wrote, "lots of great moments pop up in this excellent program. Bart's rise to fame sparkles via its deft parody of instant—and fleeting—fame, and many wacky bits show up along the way such as Homer's fear that Bart got turned into a box. [...] This might be Season Five's best show."

Patrick Bromley of DVD Verdict gave the episode a grade of A−, while Bill Gibron of DVD Talk gave the episode a score of 4 out of 5.
