= Homer's Night Out =

- The Simpsons episode
- Episode no.: Season 1 Episode 10
- Directed by: Rich Moore
- Written by: Jon Vitti
- Production code: 7G10
- Original air date: March 25, 1990

Guest appearance
- Sam McMurray as Gulliver Dark

Episode features
- Chalkboard gag: "I will not call my teacher 'hot cakes'"
- Couch gag: The couch collapses after the family squeezes into it.
- Commentary: Matt Groening; Rich Moore; Jon Vitti

Episode chronology
| ← Previous "Life on the Fast Lane" | Next → "The Crepes of Wrath" |
- The Simpsons season 1

"Homer's Night Out" is the tenth episode of the American animated television series The Simpsons. It originally aired on Fox in the United States on March 25, 1990. It was written by Jon Vitti and directed by Rich Moore. In the episode, Bart orders a mail-order spy camera, which he uses to secretly photograph Homer dancing with an exotic belly dancer. Marge makes Homer apologize to the exotic dancer to teach Bart that women are not objects. Sam McMurray guest stars in the episode as Gulliver Dark, the man who introduces Homer to the crowd at the burlesque show.

The episode was well received by critics and was the second highest rated show on the Fox network the week it aired. This episode, along with three other episodes of the show, is featured on The Simpsons "Gone Wild" DVD released in 2004.

== Plot ==
Bart purchases a miniature spy camera from a mail-order catalog and uses it to take candid photos around the house. Later, Homer tells Marge he is going to a bachelor party for a co-worker, Eugene Fisk. While Homer is gone, Marge decides to take the children to a seafood restaurant where — unknown to her — the bachelor party is under way in another room.

A belly dancer named Princess Kashmir arrives at the party and invites Homer to dance with her onstage. Walking out of the bathroom, Bart wanders into the bachelor party and snaps a picture of Homer and Princess Kashmir dancing. Bart brings the photo to school and gives a copy to Milhouse, who promptly gets requests for copies from other students. When the students' parents get hold of the photo, more copies circulate until everyone in Springfield has seen the picture, including Marge, who is furious. When Homer arrives home later that day, Marge demands an explanation. Bart inadvertently reveals that he had taken the picture, angering both his parents. Homer spends the night at Barney's apartment after Marge kicks him out of the house.

The next day, Homer goes home to apologize to Marge, who worries the picture will make Bart think it is acceptable to treat women as sex objects. She insists that Homer take Bart to meet Princess Kashmir so he can see that she is more than just a stripper. Homer and Bart scour Springfield's strip clubs searching for Princess Kashmir, eventually finding her at the Sapphire Lounge.

Homer introduces himself and Bart to Princess Kashmir, who is preoccupied with her upcoming performance but understands what Homer is trying to teach his son. Homer inadvertently finds himself onstage when the striptease show starts. He is about to be thrown offstage when the audience recognizes him from the picture. Homer gets caught up in the audience's fanfare and starts dancing with the showgirls until he remembers the lesson he is trying to teach Bart. Homer stops the show and makes a plea to the audience to treat women with respect. Marge, who is in the audience, accepts Homer's apology and they reconcile.

== Production ==
The episode was written by Jon Vitti and directed by Rich Moore. Barney's apartment, which Homer spends the night in when he is kicked out by Marge, is partly based on an apartment that Jim Reardon, Moore, and a few other animators of The Simpsons shared in college. One of the strip clubs Homer and Bart visit when they are trying to find Princess Kashmir is based on the Seventh Veil Strip Club in Los Angeles, California. The staff went around Hollywood taking pictures of strip clubs so they could get inspiration for the interior design of the strip club buildings in Springfield. The character designer designed over fifty different international showgirl costumes for the showgirls in the burlesque show sequence. Carl Carlson made his first appearance on The Simpsons in this episode, though he is voiced by Harry Shearer instead of Hank Azaria or Alex Désert who voice him in later appearances.

== Reception ==
In its original American broadcast, "Homer's Night Out" finished fourteenth place in the weekly ratings for the week of March 19–25, 1990, with a Nielsen rating of 16.9. It was the second highest rated show on Fox that week.

"Homer's Night Out" received generally positive reviews from critics. In a DVD review of the first season, David B. Grelck rated this episode a 4 (of 5) and named it one of his two favorite episodes of the season. He added that it "allows us to see that Homer really does love Marge a lot without having to blatantly stamp sentimentality all over it. The episode is strange, goofy and fun." Colin Jacobson at DVD Movie Guide said that "the concept of Marge's anger at Homer got old, but this episode managed to offer a reasonably entertaining affair. It was fun to see Homer treated like a party god, and this offered a few nice moments. The overall level of quality remained good throughout the show, but it didn't rise to any great heights."

David Packard at DVD Verdict said in a review of The Simpsons "Gone Wild" DVD that "this episode sports some of the awkward animation and voice work that is prevalent in episodes from the first season. That aspect isn't an issue to me; in fact, I quite enjoy season one as it shows the early efforts of the series getting its legs in making the transition from its origin on The Tracey Ullman Show. The problem I have with this episode is that it's not particularly funny. I chuckled a few times, but the episode doesn't have the rollicking gags and sly humor of the two episodes to follow."
