= Jon Vitti =

American television and film writer

Jonathan M. Vitti is an American writer best known for his work on the television series The Simpsons. He has also written for King of the Hill, The Critic, and The Office, and has served as a screenwriter or consultant for several animated and live-action movies, including Ice Age (2002), Robots (2005), and Horton Hears a Who! (2008). He is one of the eleven writers of The Simpsons Movie and also wrote the screenplays for the film adaptations Alvin and the Chipmunks; its sequel; and The Angry Birds Movie.

== Career ==
Vitti graduated from Harvard University in 1981, where he was president of the Harvard Lampoon along with Mike Reiss. Prior to joining The Simpsons, he had a brief stint at Saturday Night Live, describing his experience on a DVD commentary as "a very unhappy year."

Vitti was among the earliest writers hired for The Simpsons in 1989; he is credited as a story editor for the show's first season alongside contributing numerous scripts. He would remain on the show's writing staff until his departure in 1993 - following the completion of the show's fourth season - following which he wrote for the HBO series The Larry Sanders Show. Although he would contribute occasional scripts to The Simpsons throughout the following decade - most notably "Home Sweet Homediddly-Dum-Doodily" - Vitti remained largely uninvolved with the series from the fifth to the twelfth season; he would ultimately return as a producer for seasons 13 and 15. On the season four Simpsons episode "The Front," Vitti is caricatured as a Harvard graduate who gets fired from I&S Studios for penning mediocre episodes and gets hit on the head with a name plate by his boss, Roger Meyers.

Vitti also wrote for The Office beginning in season seven.

== Writing credits ==
=== The Simpsons episodes ===
He is credited with writing the following episodes:

- "Bart the Genius" (1990)
- "Homer's Night Out" (1990)
- "The Crepes of Wrath" (with George Meyer, Sam Simon, and John Swartzwelder) (1990)
- "Simpson and Delilah" (1990)
- "Bart's Dog Gets an "F"" (1991)
- "Lisa's Substitute" (1991)
- "When Flanders Failed" (1991)
- "Burns Verkaufen der Kraftwerk" (1991)
- "Radio Bart" (1992)
- "Bart the Lover" (1992)
- "Black Widower" (Teleplay) (1992)
- "Treehouse of Horror III" (with Al Jean, Mike Reiss, Jay Kogen, Wallace Wolodarsky, and Sam Simon) (1992)
- "Mr. Plow" (1992)
- "Brother from the Same Planet" (1993)
- "So It's Come to This: A Simpsons Clip Show" (1993)
- "Cape Feare" (1993)
- "Another Simpsons Clip Show" (credited as Penny Wise) (1994)
- "Home Sweet Homediddly-Dum-Doodily" (1995)
- "The Simpsons 138th Episode Spectacular" (credited as Penny Wise) (1995)
- "The Old Man and the Key" (2002)
- "Weekend at Burnsie's" (2002)
- "Little Girl in the Big Ten" (2002)
- "Marge vs. Singles, Seniors, Childless Couples and Teens, and Gays" (2004)
- "Simple Simpson" (2004)
- "Sleeping with the Enemy" (2004)

=== The Larry Sanders Show episodes ===
- "Jeannie's Visit"
- "Hank's Sex Tape"
- "Larry's Sitcom" (Teleplay, with John Riggi)
- "Everybody Loves Larry"
- "Make a Wish"

Vitti was nominated for Primetime Emmy Awards for Outstanding Writing in a Comedy Series for "Hank's Sex Tape" and "Everybody Loves Larry". He was also credited as co-executive producer for 30 of the 89 episodes.

=== The Critic episodes ===
- "Dr Jay"
- "Siskel & Ebert & Jay & Alice"
- "I Can't Believe It's a Clip Show"

=== King of the Hill episodes ===
- "Jon Vitti Presents: 'Return To La Grunta'"
- "Dog Dale Afternoon"
- "Rodeo Days"
- "Hank's Bad Hair Day"
- "Hank's Choice"

=== The Office episodes ===
- "Viewing Party"
- "Garage Sale"

== Films ==
=== Screenwriter ===
- The Simpsons Movie (2007) (With James L. Brooks, Matt Groening, Al Jean, Ian Maxtone-Graham, George Meyer, David Mirkin, Mike Reiss, Mike Scully, Matt Selman and John Swartzwelder)
- Alvin and the Chipmunks (2007) (With Will McRobb and Chris Viscardi)
- Surviving Sid (2008) (Short film) (With Mike Reiss and Yoni Brenner)
- Alvin and the Chipmunks: The Squeakquel (2009) (With Jonathan Aibel and Glenn Berger)
- The Angry Birds Movie (2016)
- Fixed (2025) (With Genndy Tartakovsky)

=== Consultant ===
- Ice Age (2002) (story consultant)
- Robots (2005)
- Horton Hears a Who! (2008) (story consultant)
