= Jeffrey Lynch =

American animator and graphic artist

Jeffrey Lynch is an American animator and graphic artist. His past work includes: animation director on The Simpsons and Futurama; assistant director on Spider-Man, Spider-Man 2, Spider-Man 3, and The Iron Giant as story department head.

== Personal information ==
Lynch has been creating motion media ranging from TV commercial to corporate communications for almost 30 years. He has worked for a number of clients. Having worked in medical, education, technology, politics, fashion, and non-profit organizations, Lynch has directed actors and celebrities such as James Earl Jones and Martha Stewart.

In his career, Lynch has worked as a marketing strategist, director, photographer and musician.

== Awards ==
- International Film + TV Festival of New York
- Telly awards and the Addys

== Clients ==
- Bristol-Myers Squibb
- Sanofi-Synthelabo
- Merck and Company
- PinnacleHealth
- Highmark
- Lancaster Regional Medical Center
- DuPont
- Rohm and Haas
- Armstrong
- WoodMode
- Graco
- Broadband Networks
- Cardinal Technologies
- T. Rowe Price
- Bank of Lancaster County
- Elizabethtown College
- Juniata College
- The Philadelphia Orchestra
- The Lancaster Symphony Orchestra
- The Campaign Group
- The Miss America Organization

== Education ==
Lynch received his degree in documentary filmmaking from Temple University, while also attended the Robert Flaherty Film Seminar. He also worked for the Advertising and Marketing Services group at Armstrong. Armstrong is an interior furnishings manufacturer from Lancaster, Pennsylvania.

== Directing credits ==
=== The Simpsons episodes ===
He is credited with directing the following episodes:

- "Like Father, Like Clown"
- "I Married Marge"
- "Separate Vocations"
- "Marge Gets a Job"
- "Brother from the Same Planet"
- "Whacking Day"
- "Boy-Scoutz 'n the Hood"
- "Lisa vs. Malibu Stacy"
- "The Boy Who Knew Too Much"
- "Homer Badman"
- "Who Shot Mr. Burns? (Part One)"
- "Raging Abe Simpson and His Grumbling Grandson in 'The Curse of the Flying Hellfish'"

=== Futurama episodes ===
He is credited with directing the following episodes:

- "My Three Suns"
- "Brannigan, Begin Again"

== Filmography ==
He is credited with directing second unit on the following films:

Year	Title	Roles	Director	Notes
1985	The Black Cauldron	Assistant animator	Richard Rich and Ted Berman	
1986	The Great Mouse Detective	Key assistant animator	Burny Mattinson, Dave Michener, Ron Clements, and John Musker	
1988	Oliver & Company	Character animator	George Scribner	
1993	Jason Goes to Hell: The Final Friday	Storyboard artist	Adam Marcus	
1999	The Iron Giant	Story department head	Brad Bird	
1999	For Love of the Game	Storyboard artist	Sam Raimi	
2000	The Gift	Storyboard artist	Sam Raimi	
2002	Spider-Man	Second unit director	Sam Raimi	(As Jeffrey A. Lynch)
2004	Spider-Man 2	Second unit director	Sam Raimi	(As Jeffrey A. Lynch)
2004	The Incredibles	Storyboard artist	Brad Bird	
2005	Corpse Bride	Head of story	Tim Burton	
2007	Spider-Man 3	Second unit director, storyboard artist	Sam Raimi	(As Jeffrey A. Lynch)
2009	Drag Me to Hell	Special thanks	Sam Raimi	(As Jeffrey A. Lynch)
2010	Megamind	Story artist: pre-production	Tom McGrath	(As Jeffrey A. Lynch)
2011	Mission: Impossible – Ghost Protocol	Second unit director	Brad Bird	
2013	Oz the Great and Powerful	Second unit director	Sam Raimi	
2015	Tomorrowland	Second unit director	Brad Bird	
2018	Incredibles 2	Additional story artist	Brad Bird	
2026	Ray Gunn	Additional story artist	Brad Bird	
