= Burns Verkaufen der Kraftwerk =

- The Simpsons episode
- Homer skipping through the Land of Chocolate in a fantasy sequence
- Episode no.: Season 3 Episode 11
- Directed by: Mark Kirkland
- Written by: Jon Vitti
- Production code: 8F09
- Original air date: December 5, 1991

Guest appearances
- Phil Hartman as Horst and the Stockbroker

Episode features
- Chalkboard gag: "The Christmas pageant does not stink"
- Couch gag: Santa's Little Helper is on the couch and growls menacingly. The family backs away slowly.
- Commentary: Matt Groening; Al Jean; Mike Reiss; Dan Castellaneta; Jon Vitti; Mark Kirkland; David Silverman

Episode chronology
← Previous "Flaming Moe's"	Next → "I Married Marge"
- The Simpsons season 3

"Burns Verkaufen der Kraftwerk" (German pronunciation: [bœːɐ̯ns fɛɐ̯ˈkaʊ̯fn̩ deːɐ̯ ˈkʁaftvɛʁk]) is the eleventh episode of the third season of the American animated television series The Simpsons. It first aired on Fox in the United States on December 5, 1991. In the episode, Mr. Burns sells the power plant to two German investors for $100 million. The new owners immediately fire Homer, the plant's safety inspector, for his incompetence. Burns soon realizes his former workers no longer fear him and buys the plant back to regain their respect.

The episode was written by Jon Vitti and directed by Mark Kirkland. Originally, the writers wanted to have Burns sell the plant to Japanese investors, but they decided that this would have been too clichéd, and the characters were rewritten as German. The title is an inaccurate German translation of "Burns sells the power plant", the correct version being Burns verkauft das Kraftwerk.

In its original airing on Fox, the episode had a 12.6 Nielsen rating, finishing the week ranked 38th. "Burns Verkaufen der Kraftwerk" received generally positive reviews from critics and was praised for several scenes, particularly the "Land of Chocolate" sequence in which Homer dances around in an imaginary land made entirely out of chocolate. The sequence was also remade as a cutscene and level in The Simpsons Game.

== Plot ==
The employees of the Springfield Nuclear Power Plant become wealthy after selling their company stock, except for Homer, who sold his shares prematurely to a shady stockbroker and only netted $25. Meanwhile, two German businessmen named Hans and Fritz visit Springfield, wanting to approach Mr. Burns about buying the power plant. They bump into Homer at Moe's tavern, where he boasts that Burns will not sell the plant for any less than $100 million after hearing Burns' assistant Waylon Smithers claim so. Burns claims that he would never sell his plant to Germans, and meets with Hans and Fritz just so he can tell them no face to face. However, he is ecstatic to discover that they are offering him $100 million, and accepts. Hans and Fritz become owners of the power plant, and Burns retires, while Smithers remains an employee.

The new owners immediately begin a thorough evaluation of the plant and its employees; Homer worries his lax work ethic as safety inspector will cost him his job. When Hans and Fritz interview Homer, he is unable to intelligently answer their questions and daydreams about frolicking in "The Land of Chocolate" after hearing Germany being mentioned as such. Just as Homer feared, the owners announce that he will be the only employee fired, so the rest of the Simpson family makes budget cuts until he can find a new job. Burns has drinks with Smithers at Moe's Tavern, where Homer has been drinking. Homer and the other patrons except Smithers taunt Burns. Humiliated, Burns realizes that his former employees no longer fear him. Since his ownership of the plant gave him power over ordinary men, Burns decides to buy it back.

Hans and Fritz discover that the plant is in need of repairs and decide to sell before they sink too much money into it. Burns, noting their desperation to sell, offers them $50 million for the plant; they reluctantly accept half what they had paid him. Now back in charge, Burns re-hires Homer, saying that it is better to keep one's enemies close, and vows for revenge for the humiliation he suffered at the bar.

== Production ==
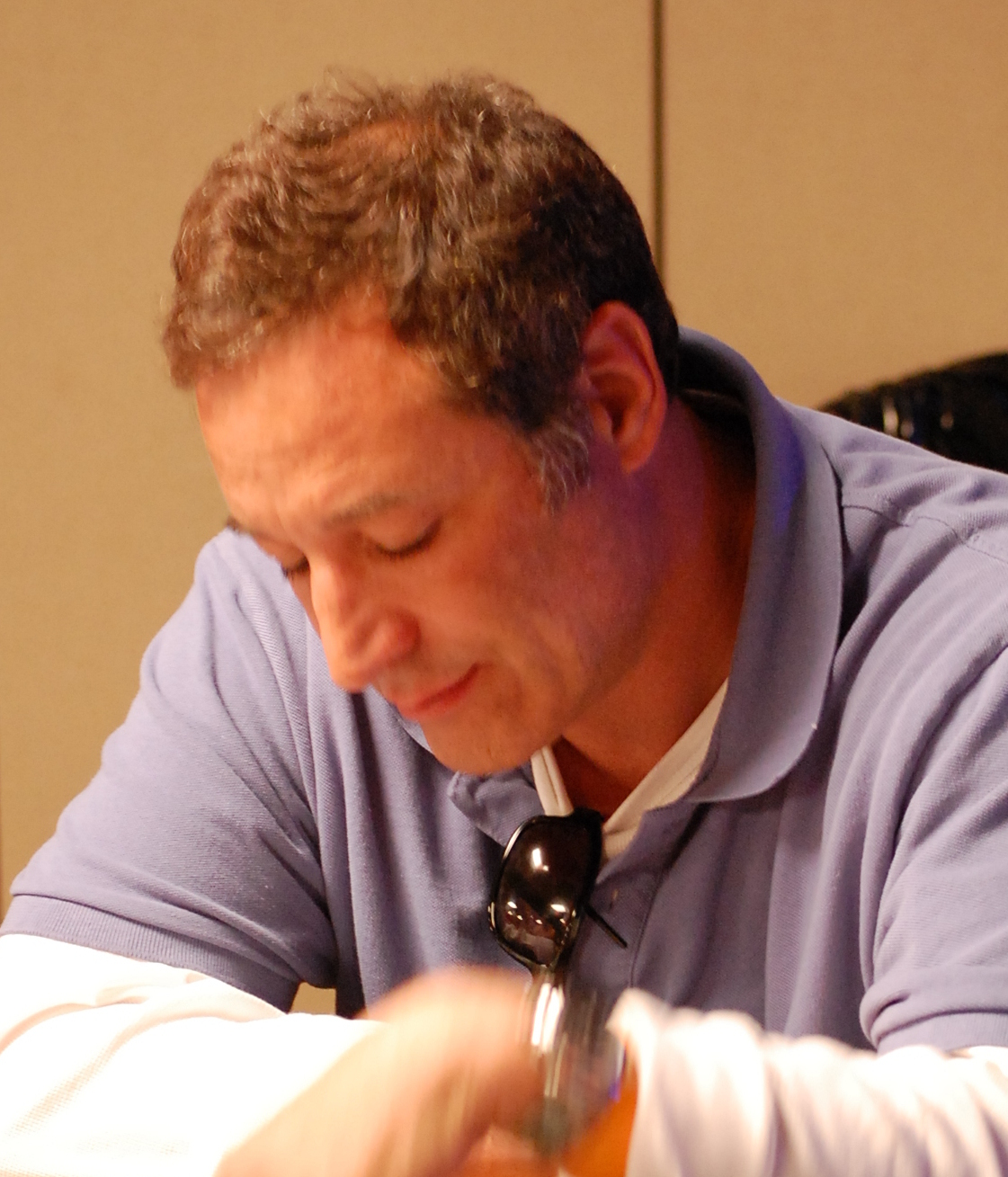
Executive producer Sam Simon pitched the idea of Homer's dream of the Land of Chocolate.

The episode was written by Jon Vitti and directed by Mark Kirkland. It features several German elements, including a reference to John F. Kennedy's "ich bin ein Berliner" speech. The title "Burns Verkaufen der Kraftwerk" is an inaccurate German translation of "Burns sells the power plant", the correct version being Burns verkauft das Kraftwerk. Originally, the writers decided to have Burns sell the plant to the Japanese, but they decided that it would have been too clichéd; the plot, however, remained the same with the Germans. The writers and animators based the character of Horst on the German character Sergeant Schultz from the American television show Hogan's Heroes. By coincidence, frequent Simpsons guest star Phil Hartman happened to know a little German, so he helped out with the conversations. Hartman also guest-starred in the episode as Horst and the stockbroker. In the dubbed German version of the episode, the two Germans whom Homer meets in Moe's Tavern each speak a different dialect to distinguish them from the American characters who speak Standard German.

The writers had a tough time coming up with Bart's prank call to Moe's Tavern and Moe's reply, in which they could not include any foul language. The writer also wanted to include a longer portion of Burns's sworn vengeance, but had to trim it in the end. In this episode, the producers decided to start stressing the relationship between Smithers and Burns. Originally, there was a two-minute scene involving the two, but the writers cut it down considerably. The producers also noted the constant flux of the Simpsons' economic state; one moment Homer appears to have his wallet full of cash, and the next, they do not even have a savings account.

The animators also included a character other than Lenny or Homer with a beardline, something the producers did not like. Originally, when The Simpsons shorts aired on The Tracy Ullman Show, all the male characters had beardlines similar to Homer's; however, after the Simpsons became their own show, they decided to drop the beardline for the majority of the characters to make Homer unique. After Homer gets fired, Bart feeds his cat a mixture of 88% ash and 12% carrots. The gag came from a real-life experience when Vitti tried to feed his cat a mixture of carrots and ash; however, the cat simply ate and regurgitated it. The sequence with the Frosty Chocolate Milkshakes in which Bart dreams what he would do with the money from the stocks is a reference to The Tracey Ullman Show shorts.

=== "The Land of Chocolate" ===
In the original script, the "Land of Chocolate" sequence was absent, though the dialogue that sets it up was present. (Homer complains to his new German bosses about the candy machines not working, to which one of them replies: "We understand, Homer. After all, we are from the land of chocolate!") Executive producer Sam Simon was the one who suggested that they actually do a sequence in which Homer's mind wanders off into an imaginary land made of chocolate. The sequence was originally storyboarded by animator Kevin O'Brien, who designed it to be a parody of The Sound of Music, but supervising director David Silverman suggested it should be more original. Silverman storyboarded the revised sequence, and tried to make Homer "deliriously happy" as he skipped through the town. He later recalled, "I animated that scene frame by frame, I needed to draw the skip I wanted. Homer's skipping sets the tone for that show."

A road sign in the sequence was originally supposed to read "Hershey Highway", a double entendre due to the phrase being a euphemism for anal sex and a reference to the chocolate manufacturer Hershey's. Because censors objected to this joke, the writers replaced it with a sign reading "Fudge Town". The "Land of Chocolate" sequence was set to a song based on music from the film Tucker: The Man and His Dream. Composed by Alf Clausen, the song was later included in the 1999 compilation album Go Simpsonic with The Simpsons. "The Land of Chocolate" was also featured as a level in The Simpsons Game, which was released in 2007.

== Reception ==
In its original airing on Fox, the episode acquired a 12.6 Nielsen rating and was viewed in approximately 11.60 million homes. It finished 38th in the ratings for the week of December 2–8, 1991. It finished second in its timeslot behind The Cosby Show, which came in at 11th with a 16.8 rating. The Simpsons was the highest rated show on Fox that week.

Since airing, "Burns Verkaufen der Kraftwerk" has received generally positive reviews from critics. The authors of the book I Can't Believe It's a Bigger and Better Updated Unofficial Simpsons Guide, Gary Russell and Gareth Roberts, praised the episode, most notably "Homer in the land of chocolate and Smithers counselling Mr. Burns with the aid of his sock-puppet friend, Mr. Snappy the Alligator". Writing for the Star Tribune, Neal Justin rated the episode as one of his ten favorites, commenting that the scene where "Homer dreams about prancing across a literal 'land of chocolate' [was] perhaps the most outrageous moment in Simpsons history".

In a list of Homer's best gluttony moments, Herald Sun's Mikey Cahill ranked "The Land of Chocolate" as number one. The sequence was also named one of the twenty best moments in the history of the show by Daily Record's Brian McIver. In 2012, Johnny Dee of The Guardian listed the episode as one of his five favorites in the history of The Simpsons, noting that it was the "Land of Chocolate" segment that "makes this episode such a classic". Jon Greenberg of ESPN said the episode is one of his favorites, calling it "hardly an average episode". He commented that "the sarcastic heart of the story comes at the end, when Mr. Burns realizes that wealth and time do not buy him happiness because no one, not even the scourge of Sector 7G [Homer], is scared of a powerless despot."

The episode was study material for a sociology course at University of California Berkeley, where it was used to "examine issues of the production and reception of cultural objects, in this case, a satirical cartoon show", and to figure out what it was "trying to tell audiences about aspects primarily of American society, and, to a lesser extent, about other societies."
