= Lisa on Ice =

- The Simpsons episode
- Promotional image for the episode
- Episode no.: Season 6 Episode 8
- Directed by: Bob Anderson
- Written by: Mike Scully
- Production code: 2F05
- Original air date: November 13, 1994

Episode features
- Chalkboard gag: "I will not dissect things unless instructed"
- Couch gag: The Simpsons sit on the couch and get sprung into the ceiling, with only their legs and feet showing.
- Commentary: Matt Groening; David Mirkin; Mike Scully; Bob Anderson

Episode chronology
← Previous "Bart's Girlfriend"	Next → "Homer Badman"
- The Simpsons season 6

"Lisa on Ice" is the eighth episode of the sixth season of the American animated television series The Simpsons. It was the first broadcast on Fox in the United States on November 13, 1994, and aired on BBC Two in the UK on November 1, 1999. In this episode, Lisa discovers that she possesses a skill for ice hockey. A rivalry between her and Bart ensues, as the siblings play for opposing teams.

The episode was written by Mike Scully and directed by Bob Anderson. Scully's passion for hockey inspired the plot. It was also Scully's second episode as a writer, after Lisa's Rival. It features cultural references to films such as Rollerball and The Pope of Greenwich Village. The episode was well received by critics and acquired a Nielsen rating of 11.6.

== Plot ==
Principal Skinner gathers the students of Springfield Elementary School at an assembly to announce which subjects they are failing, especially Ralph. Lisa, who prides herself on her academic achievements, is horrified to discover she is failing gym class. Lisa attempts to appeal to her gym teacher, who makes her a deal: if Lisa regularly participates in a sports program outside of school, she will get a passing grade in gym class. Lisa attempts to join a basketball team, but is unable to dribble properly. She then attempts to join a volleyball team, but the team's only ball is deflated when it lands on her spiky hair. Lisa becomes despondent.

Later, the family watches Bart play hockey for his team, the Mighty Pigs, coached by Chief Wiggum. After the game, Bart ridicules Lisa for her lack of athletic skill and uses his hockey stick to pelt her with litter. Apu, the coach of the Kwik-E-Mart Gougers, witnesses Lisa deflecting the litter and throws a hockey puck at her without warning, which she catches. Apu makes Lisa the Gougers' goalie. Lisa excels as goalie and leads the team to its best season ever.

Homer begins alternately favoring Bart and Lisa depending on whose team is winning more games. As a result, a sibling rivalry develops between Bart and Lisa. The rivalry peaks when the town learns that the Gougers will face the Mighty Pigs at their next match. Bart and Lisa's animosity towards each other enhances their athletic skill. With four seconds left, Bart is tripped by Jimbo, giving him a penalty shot against Lisa that will decide the outcome of the game. As they face off, Bart and Lisa remember the good times they had together when they were younger. Bart and Lisa discard their equipment and hug each other. The match ends in a tie, much to Marge's pride and Homer's distress. Dissatisfied with the outcome, the spectators riot and trash the arena.

== Production ==
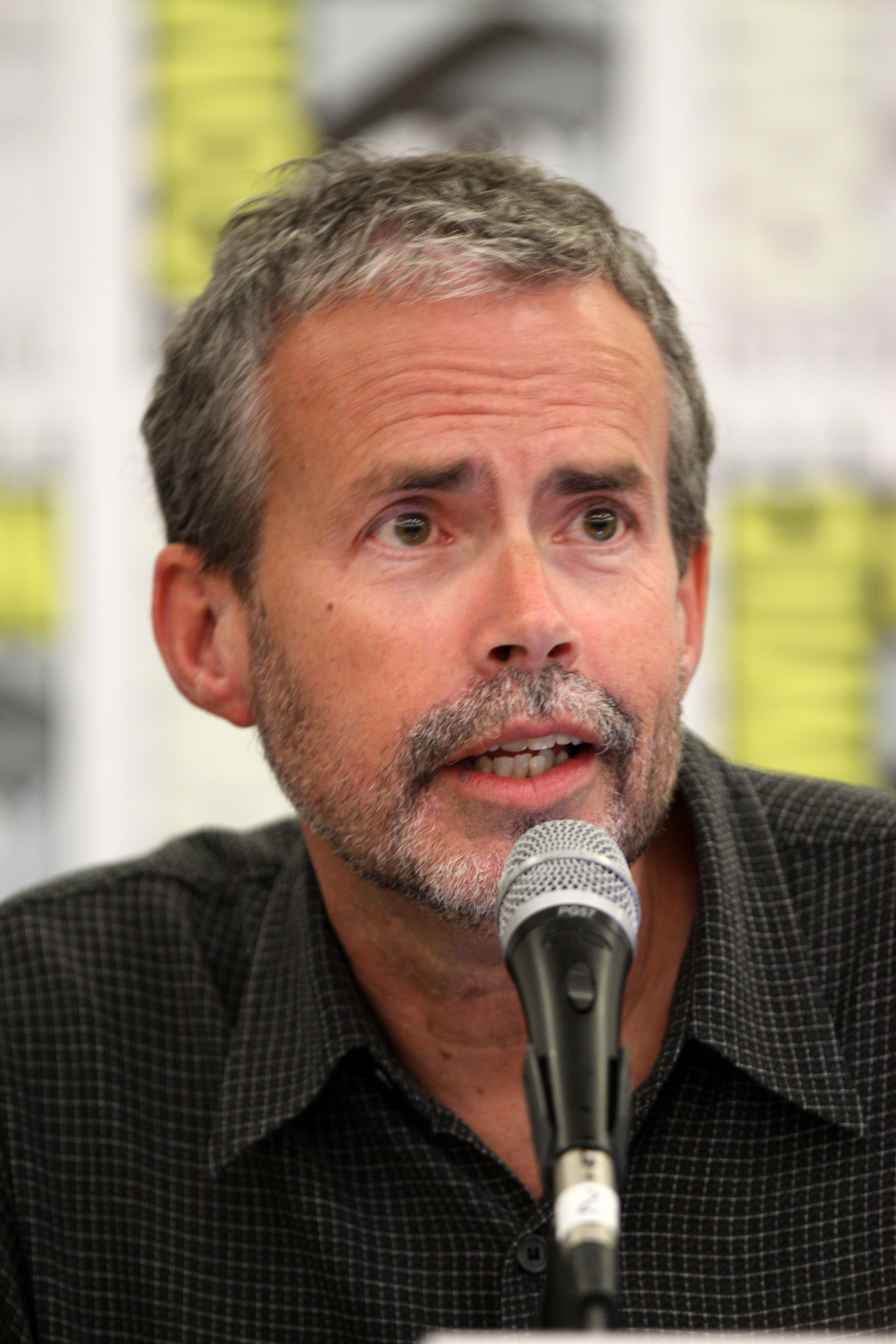
Mike Scully wrote the episode.

The idea for the episode came from The Simpsons writer Mike Scully, who wanted to do an episode involving ice hockey because of his passion for the sport. Bob Anderson, who also had a small interest in hockey, directed the episode. To better familiarize himself with the sport, Anderson ordered a batch of VHS highlight tapes, watched the NHL playoffs for the first time, and made several trips to scout youth games, taking notes on how players looked stickhandling and shooting.

In his original draft of the episode, Scully had written cameos for Bobby Orr and Wayne Gretzky, but, he explained, "they wound up falling out of the story, because we had such a good story with the family." Gretzky eventually ended up appearing in the Season 28 episode "The Nightmare After Krustmas", becoming the first hockey player to guest-star on the show.

The episode starts out with Lisa tricking Bart into believing it is a snow day by throwing a snowball at him which she made out of the ice in the fridge. The scene was inspired by Scully, who as a child loved to sit and listen by the radio waiting to see if there was going to be a school snow day. Scully thought that there was nothing more disappointing than to wake up expecting a snow day, only to find out there was no snow. The academic alerts the Springfield Elementary School students receive were based on those Scully received in junior high. The scene where Milhouse was bound by his hands and legs to the net was inspired by stories Scully had heard about Springfield Indians owner Eddie Shore tying his players to the posts "trying to teach his goalies to stay in the crease." Lisa's line, "Hack the bone! Hack the bone!" was inspired by ex–Springfield Kings backstop Billy Smith.

Although there was an emphasis on detail for the show, one mistake Scully regrets is having the game clock running (and eventually expiring) on Bart's penalty shot. The clock would be paused in a normal hockey game until the shot was taken.

== Cultural references ==
The episode features several references to Rollerball (1975). Kent Brockman's line about a Garry Trudeau musical revue about Ronald Reagan is a reference to Rap Master Ronnie, an off-Broadway play about the Reagan administration that ran throughout the 1980s. At the assembly, bully Kearney has Dolph take a memo on an Apple Newton, a personal digital assistant. When Dolph writes "Beat up Martin" on the screen, the handwriting recognition changes it to "Eat up Martha", and Kearney throws the Newton at Martin instead, referencing the MessagePad's poor handwriting recognition. The assembly is held at the Butt-Head Memorial Auditorium; Skinner muses "I really shouldn't have let the students name that one." When Moe visits Bart and Lisa at the Simpson house to see if they have any injuries that may affect the odds of the upcoming game, Marge sends him away as he pleads, "They're gonna take my thumbs!"; a reference to an Eric Roberts' line, "Charlie, they took my thumb", in The Pope of Greenwich Village (1984).

== Reception ==
In its original broadcast, "Lisa on Ice" finished 34th in the ratings for the week of November 7 to November 13, 1994, with a Nielsen rating of 11.6. It was the second-highest-rated show on the Fox network that week.

Since airing, the episode has received mostly positive reviews from television critics. The authors of the book I Can't Believe It's a Bigger and Better Updated Unofficial Simpsons Guide, Gary Russell and Gareth Roberts, called it "a fabulous episode for Lisa and Bart, although with a special mention for a few seconds of tremendous Edna Krabappel wickedness". DVD Verdict's Ryan Keefer said the episode "is one of the few episodes centered on Lisa that I enjoy watching", and gave it a B+ grade. DVD Talk's Aaron Beierle said, "there are definitely some funny moments in this episode, the sweet-natured way that the episode ends never sat right with me". ESPN.com named the episode the fifth best sports moment in the history of the show. The Orlando Sentinel's Gregory Hardy listed it as the seventh-best episode of the show with a sports theme.

TV Squad's Adam Finley gave the episode a positive review, commenting that it is "a skewering of parents who become too involved in their children's sports and turn what should be a lesson in teamwork, trying your hardest, and losing gracefully into a kind of Roman Coliseum where grown adults live out violent fantasies and their own failed ambitions through their children". He added, "Homer is an absolute jerk in this episode, taunting his children when they lose and praising them when they win and humiliate their sibling" and "it's not just Homer. Marge, characteristically so, tries to remain diplomatic, but even she starts screaming for blood when Bart is tripped by an opposing player."
