= Life on the Fast Lane =

- The Simpsons episode
- Episode no.: Season 1 Episode 9
- Directed by: David Silverman
- Written by: John Swartzwelder
- Production code: 7G11
- Original air date: March 18, 1990

Guest appearance
- Albert Brooks as Jacques (credited as A. Brooks)

Episode features
- Commentary: Matt Groening; James L. Brooks; David Silverman; Al Jean

Episode chronology
← Previous "The Telltale Head"	Next → "Homer's Night Out"
- The Simpsons season 1

"Life on the Fast Lane" is the ninth episode of the American animated television series The Simpsons. It originally aired on Fox in the United States on March 18, 1990. It was written by John Swartzwelder and directed by David Silverman. Albert Brooks (in his second of ten appearances) guest starred as Jacques, a French bowling instructor, with him being credited as "A. Brooks".

The episode deals with how Homer's thoughtlessness precipitates Marge's infatuation with her bowling instructor Jacques, leading to a marriage crisis between her and Homer. In the original plan for the episode, Brooks (who improvised much of his dialogue) was to voice a Swedish tennis coach called Björn, with the episode to be titled "Björn to Be Wild".

The episode features a parody of the film An Officer and a Gentleman and won the Primetime Emmy Award for Outstanding Animated Program (for Programming Less Than One Hour) in 1990.

The character of Jacques would return in the season 34 episode "Pin Gal", with Brooks reprising his role.

== Plot ==
After forgetting Marge's 34th birthday, Homer rushes to the Springfield Mall, where he buys a bowling ball with his inscribed name for himself and disguises it as her gift. At her birthday dinner, Marge is pleased with Bart and Lisa's gifts for her—a bottle of French perfume and a macaroni-and-glue portrait of her as the Mona Lisa respectively. As Homer presents the bowling ball to her, it breaks through the bottom of its box and squashes her birthday cake. Offended, Marge calls Homer out for giving her a gift for himself, pointing out that she has never gone bowling in her life and that the ball is inscribed with his name.

Determined to learn how to bowl to spite Homer, Marge visits Barney's Bowl-A-Rama. While there, she meets a French bowling instructor named Jacques, who develops an infatuation with her and offers to give her lessons. After several lessons, Jacques and Marge agree to meet for brunch, which goes well until they see Helen Lovejoy, the gossipy preacher's wife, who seems delighted to find Marge with a man other than her husband. After deflecting Helen's prying by feigning a discussion of bowling theory, Jacques asks Marge to meet him the next day at his apartment, causing her to faint. While unconscious, she sees herself dancing with Jacques in his luxurious, bowling-themed apartment. Regaining consciousness after her romantic fantasy, Marge accepts Jacques's invitation.

Meanwhile, Homer finds the personalized bowling glove Jacques gave Marge and realizes he may lose her to another man. Soon Bart realizes Lisa's suspicion that their parents are drifting apart is true. Bart advises Homer to keep quiet about Marge's suspected affair to avoid making things worse.

Marge leaves for her rendezvous with Jacques but remembers her lifetime commitment to Homer during the drive. She comes to a fork in the road, between the Springfield Nuclear Power Plant and Jacques's apartment. After agonizing over her decision, Marge surprises a distraught Homer at the plant and kisses him warmly. An ecstatic Homer abandons his work post for ten minutes and takes Marge to the backseat of his car.

== Production ==
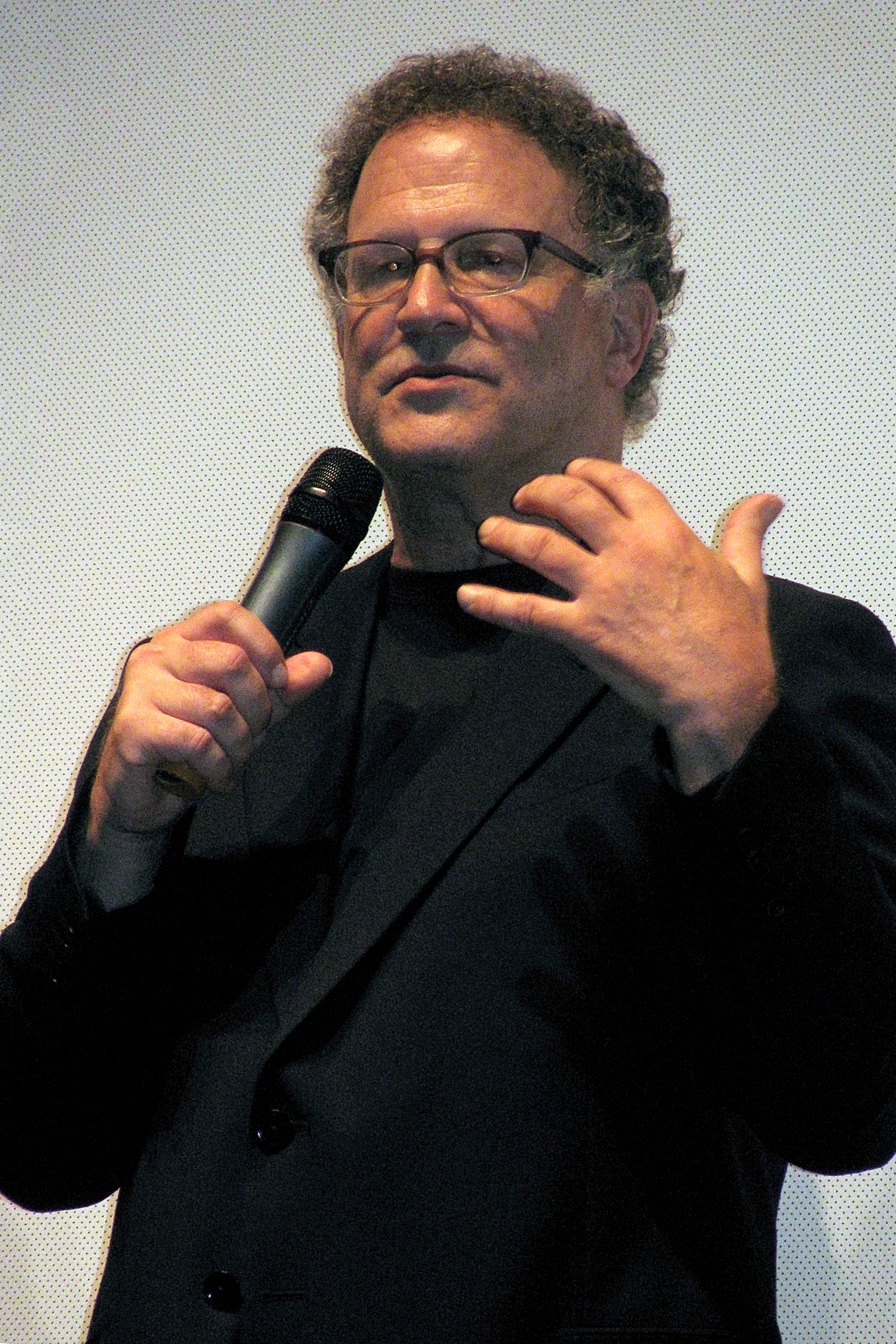
Albert Brooks provided the voice of Jacques, improvising most of his dialogue.

The episode was written by John Swartzwelder and directed by David Silverman. When the episode was originally planned, it called for Albert Brooks to voice "Björn", a Swedish tennis instructor, but Brooks thought it would be funnier to make the character French and so the change was made. The title was originally to be "Bjorn to Be Wild", thus accounting for the episode's alternate title "Jacques to Be Wild". Brooks improvised almost all his dialogue, producing over three hours of material. Marge's laugh during her bowling lesson was an ad-libbed, natural laugh by Julie Kavner, who was laughing at something Albert Brooks had just said. The line "four onion rings!" is only one of many lines Brooks ad-libbed and blew by losing Jacques's French accent. An extended audio clip of Albert Brooks's unused dialogue was made available on Disc Three of The Simpsons The Complete First Season DVD.

The sequence in which the family throws the pizza box away was specifically designed by John Swartzwelder to look surreal, with the family panning into each other. The moon was designed to resemble a bowling ball in the scene in which Jacques drops Marge home. The restaurant that Jacques and Marge visit is called "Shorty's"; it was originally intended that a chef's hat would be shown moving around in the background, implying that the owner was short, but the concept was dropped as it seemed to be too much of a silly idea. The episode's conclusion is a reference to An Officer and a Gentleman, which David Silverman had to watch first, so that he knew how to set the scene out. Homer's line, "too exciting", when he sees the lingerie store was written by James L. Brooks. During Marge's phone conversation with Patty and Selma, Maggie can be seen sucking her pacifier repeatedly, a concept dropped in later episodes as it was deemed too much of a distraction from the dialogue.

== First appearances ==
The episode features the first appearance of the bowling alley Barney's Bowlarama. The original backstory for Barney's Bowlarama was that it was owned by Barney Gumble. Over time it changed to Barney just being an employee, as the writers could not imagine Barney owning anything. It was later revealed that Barney's uncle was the owner. The exterior of the Bowlarama was designed by No Doubt member Eric Stefani. The episode also marks the first appearances of Lenny Leonard and Helen Lovejoy.

== Cultural references ==
Marge's dream resembles a dance number from The Gay Divorcee. The end scene, in which Marge walks into the power plant, and Homer carries her away, is a reference to the film An Officer and a Gentleman, and features an instrumental of the song "Up Where We Belong". The Eagles song "Life in the Fast Lane" inspired the episode title.

== Reception ==
In its original broadcast, "Life on the Fast Lane" finished 11th in ratings for the week of March 12–19, 1990, with a Nielsen rating of 17.5, equivalent to approximately 16.1 million viewing households. It was the highest-rated show on Fox that week, beating Married... with Children.

Since airing, the episode has received mostly positive reviews from television critics. Gary Russell and Gareth Roberts, the authors of the book I Can't Believe It's a Bigger and Better Updated Unofficial Simpsons Guide, called it "a very good, very assured episode that has seen some viewers (particularly female ones) tearing out their hair at the conclusion". Nathan Rabin of The A.V. Club praised the episode, stating: "There would be many funnier and faster episodes of The Simpsons but few can match "Life on the Fast Lane" for emotional depth and characterization." IGN named Albert Brooks' guest performance in this episode, along with his four other appearances, the best guest appearance in the show's history.

In a DVD review of the first season David B. Grelck rated this episode a 4 (of 5), placing it along with "Homer's Night Out" as his favorites of the season. Colin Jacobson at DVD Movie Guide said in a review that it was "another good but not great episode" and added that "Albert Brooks seriously enlivened 'Life [on the Fast Lane]' ... Jacques becomes funny not so much due to the lines themselves; it's Brooks' readings that make them work." Another DVD review from The Digital Bits called it "one of the first season's best loved episodes".

This episode won an Emmy Award for Outstanding Animated Program (For Programming One Hour or Less) in 1990, defeating fellow Simpsons episode "Simpsons Roasting on an Open Fire", and becoming the first The Simpsons episode to win the award.

In a 2000 Entertainment Weekly article, Matt Groening ranked this episode as his second favorite episode of all time, behind "Bart the Daredevil". Entertainment Weekly placed the episode twenty-first on their top 25 The Simpsons episode list, calling it "a showcase for the series' bedrock of character and heart." The Orlando Sentinel's Gregory Hardy named it the fifteenth best episode of the show with a sports theme. The episode's reference to An Officer and a Gentleman was named the 23rd greatest film reference in the history of the show by Total Film's Nathan Ditum. Simpsons co-developer Sam Simon named it his favorite episode of all time in 2009.

=== Legacy ===
The March 15, 2004 edition of the Dear Abby column was pulled, as it had emerged that one of the letters was a fake. A newspaper editor noticed that the problem cited in the letter was identical to the plot of "Life on the Fast Lane". Kathie Kerr, a spokeswoman for the Universal Press Syndicate, said "it did sound too similar not to be a hoax".
