= Like Father, Like Clown =

- The Simpsons episode
- Krusty's show
- Episode no.: Season 3 Episode 6
- Directed by: Jeffrey Lynch; Brad Bird
- Written by: Jay Kogen; Wallace Wolodarsky
- Production code: 8F05
- Original air date: October 24, 1991

Guest appearances
- Jackie Mason as Hyman Krustofsky

Episode features
- Chalkboard gag: "I will finish what I sta" (stops mid-word)
- Couch gag: Bart leaps into everybody's lap, annoying Homer.
- Commentary: Matt Groening; Al Jean; Dan Castellaneta; Julie Kavner; Jay Kogen; Wallace Wolodarsky; Brad Bird

Episode chronology
| ← Previous "Homer Defined" | Next → "Treehouse of Horror II" |
- The Simpsons season 3

"Like Father, Like Clown" is the sixth episode of the third season of the American animated television series The Simpsons. It originally aired on Fox in the United States on October 24, 1991. In the episode, Krusty the Clown reveals to the Simpsons that he is Jewish and that his father, Rabbi Hyman Krustofsky, disowned him for pursuing a career in comedy. Bart and Lisa try to reunite a heartbroken Krusty with his estranged father.

The episode was written by the duo of Jay Kogen and Wallace Wolodarsky, and directed by Jeffrey Lynch and Brad Bird; as it was Lynch's first credit as a director, Bird was assigned to help him. Krusty's religion had not been part of the original concept of the character, so Kogen and Wolodarsky decided to parody the 1927 film The Jazz Singer and establish that Krusty is Jewish. The episode was carefully researched and two rabbis, Lavi Meier and Harold M. Schulweis, were credited as "special technical consultants". Comedian Jackie Mason, who had once been an ordained rabbi, provided the voice of Hyman Krustofsky. Hyman later became an infrequently recurring character voiced by Dan Castellaneta. Mason returned to voice the character in several later episodes.

In its original broadcast, "Like Father, Like Clown" finished 34th in ratings with a Nielsen rating of 12.7. Mason won a Primetime Emmy Award in 1992 for Outstanding Voice-Over Performance for his performance as Hyman Krustofsky.

== Plot ==
Krusty had agreed to have dinner with the Simpsons to repay Bart for helping exonerate him for charges of armed robbery. (Note: As depicted in the 1990 episode "Krusty Gets Busted") When he keeps canceling, an upset Bart writes him a letter saying he has lost faith in Krusty. Krusty's secretary, Lois Pennycandy, is so moved by the letter that she threatens to quit if Krusty does not keep his promise to Bart, so Krusty reluctantly attends. When asked to say grace, Krusty recites a Hebrew blessing. Realizing that Krusty is Jewish, Lisa speaks of his heritage, making him break down in tears. He tells the family that saying the blessing reminds him of his troubled past.

Krusty reveals his real name is Herschel Krustofsky (Yiddish: הרשל קרוסטופסקי) and describes his upbringing on the Lower East Side of Springfield. His father, Hyman Krustofsky, is a rabbi who hated his son's wish to become a comedian and wanted him to follow in his footsteps. At school, Krusty made the other students laugh and became a slapstick comedian behind his father's back. One night, Krusty performed at a rabbis' convention unknowingly attended by Hyman. A rabbi squirted seltzer on him, washing off his clown makeup. Recognizing Krusty, an outraged Hyman immediately disowned his son. They have not seen or spoken to each other in 25 years.

While filming an episode of The Krusty the Klown Show, Krusty is reduced to tears on-camera after showing a father-and-son themed episode of The Itchy & Scratchy Show. Lisa says “A man who envies our family is a man who needs help” and she and Bart decide to reunite father and son. Hyman tells them: "I have no son!" and Bart says "Great, we came all this way and it's the wrong guy." He adds: "I didn't mean that literally!" He refuses to reconcile with Krusty because he believes that his son had abandoned his faith and family. To outsmart Hyman, Lisa finds Judaic teachings that urge forgiveness, but he refutes her arguments. In a last-ditch effort, Bart convinces Hyman to abandon his stubborn ways by quoting Sammy Davis Jr. — a Jewish entertainer like Krusty — and making a passionate plea about the struggles that the Jewish people have overcome. Bart's speech finally convinces Hyman that entertainers have a place in Jewish culture.

Krusty is feeling glum when he starts the live of his show, and then calls for Itchy & Scratchy to roll while he goes backstage to smoke a cigarette. Bart and Lisa arrive with Hyman, who - hidden in the darkness - admonishes Krusty for smoking before stepping into the light, and the two joyously reconcile. When Krusty goes back on set, he delivers a heartfelt speech where he introduces his father and explains that they haven't seen each other in 25 years. Hyman humorously accepts a cream pie from Bart and throws it in his son's face as the audience cheers.

== Production ==
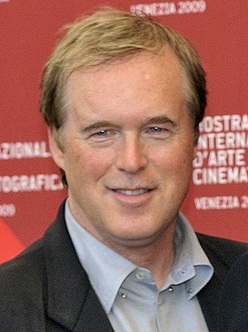
Brad Bird co-directed the episode.

"Like Father, Like Clown" was written by the duo of Jay Kogen and Wallace Wolodarsky. Krusty's religion had not been part of the original concept of the character, so Kogen and Wolodarsky decided to parody The Jazz Singer and establish that Krusty is Jewish. They pitched the idea to co-executive producer Sam Simon, who rejected it, but it was approved by James L. Brooks. Krusty's last name, Krustofsky, was established in this episode as pitched by Al Jean. The portion of the episode where characters quote the Bible in support or opposition of clowning were carefully researched. Cited passages from the Bible include Exodus 20:12 and Joshua 1:8. The quotations from the Talmud were also researched, and two rabbis, Lavi Meier and Harold M. Schulweis, were credited as "special technical consultants". Schulweis was asked to take a look at a draft of the script. While not a fan of the show, he felt "it was profound" and added some corrections. He later commented, "I thought it had a Jewish resonance to it. I was impressed by the underlying moral seriousness."

The episode was co-directed by Jeffrey Lynch and Brad Bird. It was Lynch's first credit as a director, so Bird was assigned to help him out and "usher [Lynch] into the world of directing things quickly". Krusty is one of Bird's favorite characters, and he always tries to animate a scene in every Krusty episode.

Rabbi Krustofsky was voiced by Jackie Mason, who had once been an ordained rabbi, but had resigned to become a comedian. Mason recorded his lines in New York City, and Dan Castellaneta, the voice of Krusty, went there to record with him. In the script, Bart and Lisa try to trick Rabbi Krustofsky into meeting with Krusty by arranging a lunch date between him and Saul Bellow, the "Nobel Prize-winning Jewish novelist". Originally, this was intended to be Isaac Bashevis Singer, but the writers changed it when Singer died, and Mason had to re-record his lines to accommodate the alteration. Rabbi Krustofsky became an infrequently recurring character, and his occasional speaking parts were voiced by Castellaneta. Mason later returned to voice the rabbi in "Today I Am a Clown" in the fifteenth season, "Once Upon a Time in Springfield" in the twenty-first season, and "Clown in the Dumps" in the twenty-sixth season, in which the character dies.

== Cultural references ==
The episode is a homage to the film The Jazz Singer (1927), about a son with a strict religious upbringing who defies his father to become an entertainer. Krusty is partially based on Jewish comedian Jerry Lewis, who starred in the 1959 version of the film. A nod to the film is featured in dialogue when Rabbi Krustofsky says, "Oh, if you were a musician or a jazz singer, this I could forgive!" In the Simpsons house, Krusty plays The Concert for Bangladesh. In Krusty's studio, there are pictures of him with Alfred Hitchcock and The Beatles. Lisa tells Homer there are many Jewish entertainers, including Lauren Bacall, Dinah Shore, William Shatner, and Mel Brooks. In Krusty's flashback, he and his father walk down the street in a parody of a scene from The Godfather Part II. The scene of a young Krusty practicing comedy in the bathroom is a reference to Philip Roth's Portnoy's Complaint. Lisa and Bart try to trick Hyman into meeting Krusty, telling him that "the Nobel-Prize winning Jewish novelist Saul Bellow" wants to have lunch with him at Izzy's Deli. They tell Krusty that he's to be presented with the Legion of Honor and walks in humming "La Marseillaise", asking to be directed to François Mitterrand's table. At the end of the episode, Krusty and his father sing "O Mein Papa", a 1952 song originally by Eddie Fisher. Bart quotes a passage from Sammy Davis Jr.'s 1965 autobiography Yes, I Can.

== Reception ==
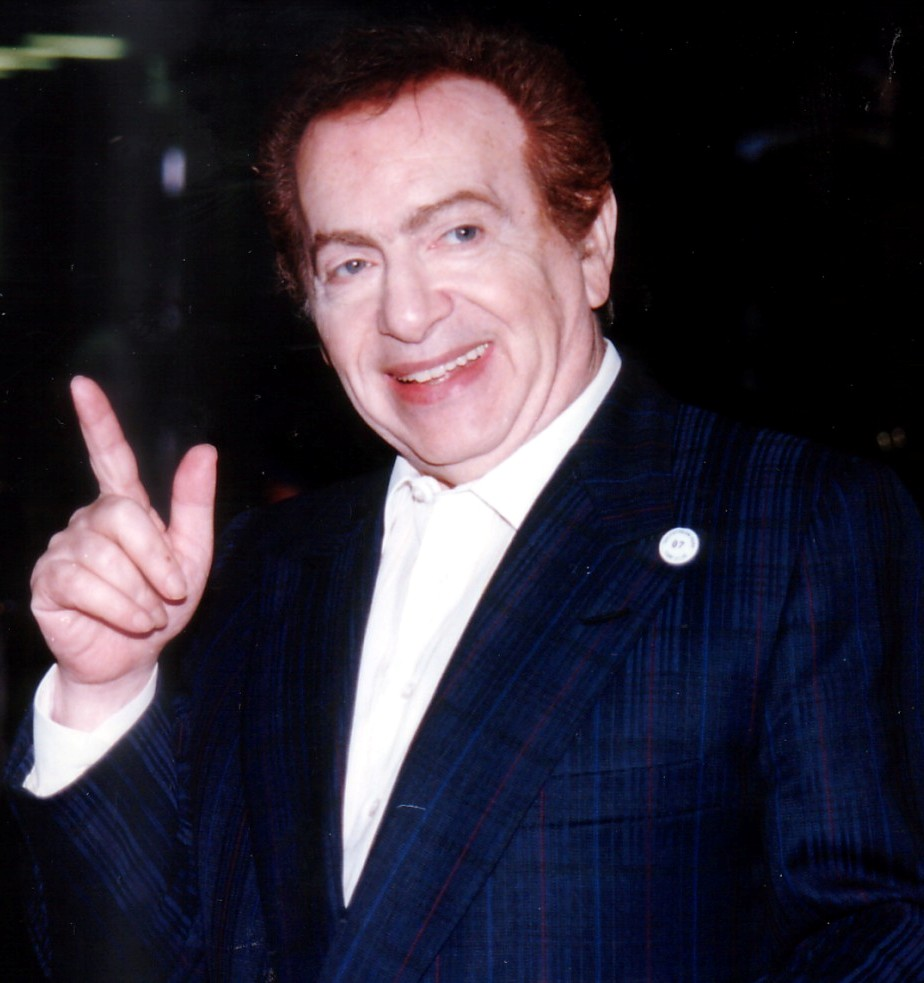
Jackie Mason won an Emmy Award for his role as Hyman Krustofsky in this episode.

In its original broadcast, "Like Father, Like Clown" finished 34th in ratings for the week of October 21–27, 1991, with a Nielsen rating of 12.7. It was the highest rated program on Fox that week. Mason won a Primetime Emmy Award in 1992 for Outstanding Voice-Over Performance for his performance as Hyman Krustofsky. He was one of six voice actors from The Simpsons to win the award in its inaugural year.

He is one of three The Simpsons guest stars to win the award; Marcia Wallace won in 1992 for voicing Edna Krabappel, and Kelsey Grammer won for voicing Sideshow Bob in 2006. In 1998, TV Guide listed it in its list of top twelve Simpsons episodes. The authors of the book I Can't Believe It's a Bigger and Better Updated Unofficial Simpsons Guide, Gary Russell and Gareth Roberts, called the episode, "a magnificent show, with Jackie Mason wonderfully over the top as Krusty's long-lost pa, and Lois Pennycandy giving Krusty a good talking to about Bart."

Alan Sepinwall and Matt Zoller Seitz of The Star-Ledger listed "Like Father, Like Clown" as one of the ten episodes of The Simpsons that shows the "comic and emotional scope of the show". They wrote, "Most Krusty the Klown episodes go heavy on celebrity cameos, while playing up the character's misanthropic greed. This one gave him a heart, as Bart and Lisa try to reunite him with his estranged rabbi father (voice of Jackie Mason), who has never forgiven his son for going into show biz." DVD Movie Guide's Colin Jacobson wrote that the episode "lacks a surfeit of guffaws, but it manages to be sweet and heartfelt without becoming sappy. It's more of a charming show than a laughfest, but it does the job."

In a retrospective review in The A.V. Club, Nathan Rabin writes "Like most Borsht-Belt shtick-slingers, Krusty is prickly and hard on the outside but soft, tender and sweet on the inside. Shtick without sentimentality is like lox without bagels and 'Like Father, Like Son' taps into a side of Krusty we seldom see: a lost little boy who never got over his father’s rejection and pines for what he sees as the domestic bliss of the Simpsons. As Lisa says with just the right note of sad, weary understanding, 'A man who envies our family is a man who needs help.'”

In his 2018 memoir Springfield Confidential, Simpsons season 3 showrunner Mike Reiss named the episode as one of four that broke new ground, alongside "Moaning Lisa", "Homer at the Bat" and the original "Treehouse of Horror". Reiss noted how the episode established several new precedents for the show: it centered on a secondary character, it focused on a non-Christian religion and expert consultants were involved in the writing of the religious debate between the Rabbi and Bart.

== Bibliography ==
- Groening, Matt (1997). Richmond, Ray; Coffman, Antonia (eds.). The Simpsons: A Complete Guide to Our Favorite Family (1st ed.). New York: HarperPerennial. ISBN 978-0-06-095252-5. LCCN 98141857. OCLC 37796735. OL 433519M.
- Pinsky, Mark I. (2007). The Gospel According to The Simpsons, Bigger and Possibly Even Better! edition (Second ed.). Louisville, Kentucky: Westminster John Knox Press. ISBN 978-0-664-23160-6.
