= The Crepes of Wrath =

- The Simpsons episode
- Episode no.: Season 1 Episode 11
- Directed by: Wesley Archer; Milton Gray
- Written by: George Meyer; Sam Simon; John Swartzwelder; Jon Vitti
- Production code: 7G13
- Original air date: April 15, 1990

Guest appearance
- Christian Coffinet as Gendarme Officer

Episode features
- Chalkboard gag: "Garlic gum is not funny"
- Couch gag: The family hurries onto the couch and Homer pops off the end. He shouts "D'oh!"
- Commentary: Wes Archer; George Meyer

Episode chronology
| ← Previous "Homer's Night Out" | Next → "Krusty Gets Busted" |
- The Simpsons season 1

"The Crepes of Wrath" is the eleventh episode of the American animated television series The Simpsons. It originally aired on Fox in the United States on April 15, 1990. It was written by George Meyer, Sam Simon, John Swartzwelder and Jon Vitti, and directed by Wes Archer and Milton Gray.

Bart is sent to France on a student exchange trip, where his hosts treat him like a slave. Meanwhile, an Albanian student temporarily lives with the rest of the Simpson family, and shows great interest in Homer's work at the nuclear power plant.

The episode received generally positive reviews from critics. In 1997, David Bauder from TV Guide named it the greatest episode of The Simpsons, and the 17th-greatest episode of any television series.

== Plot ==
At the Simpson family's house, Homer injures his back after tripping on Bart's skateboard and falling down the stairs. As punishment, Marge makes Bart clean his room, where he discovers a cherry bomb. At school the next day, Bart flushes the cherry bomb down a toilet in the boys' restroom while Principal Skinner's mother, Agnes, is using the adjacent girls' restroom. The resulting explosion blows Agnes off the toilet seat, enraging Principal Skinner.

Skinner aims to punish Bart beyond suspension or expulsion; he proposes to Homer and Marge that Bart enter the school's student exchange program, spending three months in France. When Bart is told he will stay in a lovely French château, he agrees to Skinner's plan, much to Homer and Skinner's delight. During Bart's time in France, the Simpsons host a student from Albania named Adil Hoxha.

When Bart arrives in France, he is taken to a dilapidated farmhouse in a vineyard. His hosts are winemakers César and Ugolin, who treat him like a slave; they force Bart to carry buckets of water, pick and crush hundreds of grapes, and taste wine contaminated with antifreeze. The winemakers give Bart insufficient portions of food and force him to sleep on the floor, eventually he gets homesick.

Adil arrives in Springfield and impresses Marge and Homer with his polite manners and help with household chores. Homer grants Adil's request to go on a tour of the Springfield Nuclear Power Plant. On the tour, Adil takes many photographs, which he transmits to Albania with a fax machine hidden in Bart's treehouse; unbeknownst to Skinner or the Simpsons, Adil is an Albanian spy sent to obtain blueprints of the power plant's reactor.

When the winemakers send Bart to town to buy a case of antifreeze, Bart attempts to ask a policeman for help, but he does not speak any English and hands Bart a piece of candy instead. Bart eats the candy, but expresses frustration that he has not learned any French since his arrival, only to express it in French. Upon hearing himself, he realized that he had learned French through immersion all along. With his newfound skill, he goes back to the officer and tells him about his hosts' illegal activities; they are arrested and Bart becomes a hero.

In Springfield, Adil is caught spying by the FBI and deported to Albania in exchange for the return of an American spy (also a child) captured there. Bart returns home with gifts for his family, who embrace him and compliment him on his newfound ability to speak French.

== Production ==
"The Crepes of Wrath" was the first episode of The Simpsons for which George Meyer was credited as a writer, and he wrote it together with Sam Simon, John Swartzwelder and Jon Vitti. The episode was inspired by the French movie Manon of the Spring. The writers were trying to figure out which country the foreign exchange student should come from when they decided on Albania. They had not seen many uses of the country on television and decided to make the episode a tribute to actor John Belushi, who has Albanian roots. The writers did not know much about the country and could not think of a good name for the boy, so they gave him the surname Hoxha after the former leader of Albania, Enver Hoxha. They used real Albanian in the scene where Adil says goodbye to his family, and they tried to get the actual language right at Sam Simon's instigation. They also used real French in the scenes of Bart in France. The writers did some research on a certain airport in France for the shots of Bart at the airport in Paris. Principal Skinner's mother, Agnes, made her first appearance on The Simpsons in this episode, although her voice and personality were a bit different from what the viewers became used to in the later episodes of the show. In the script her first name was Gloria, but it was established as Agnes since "Bart the Fink".

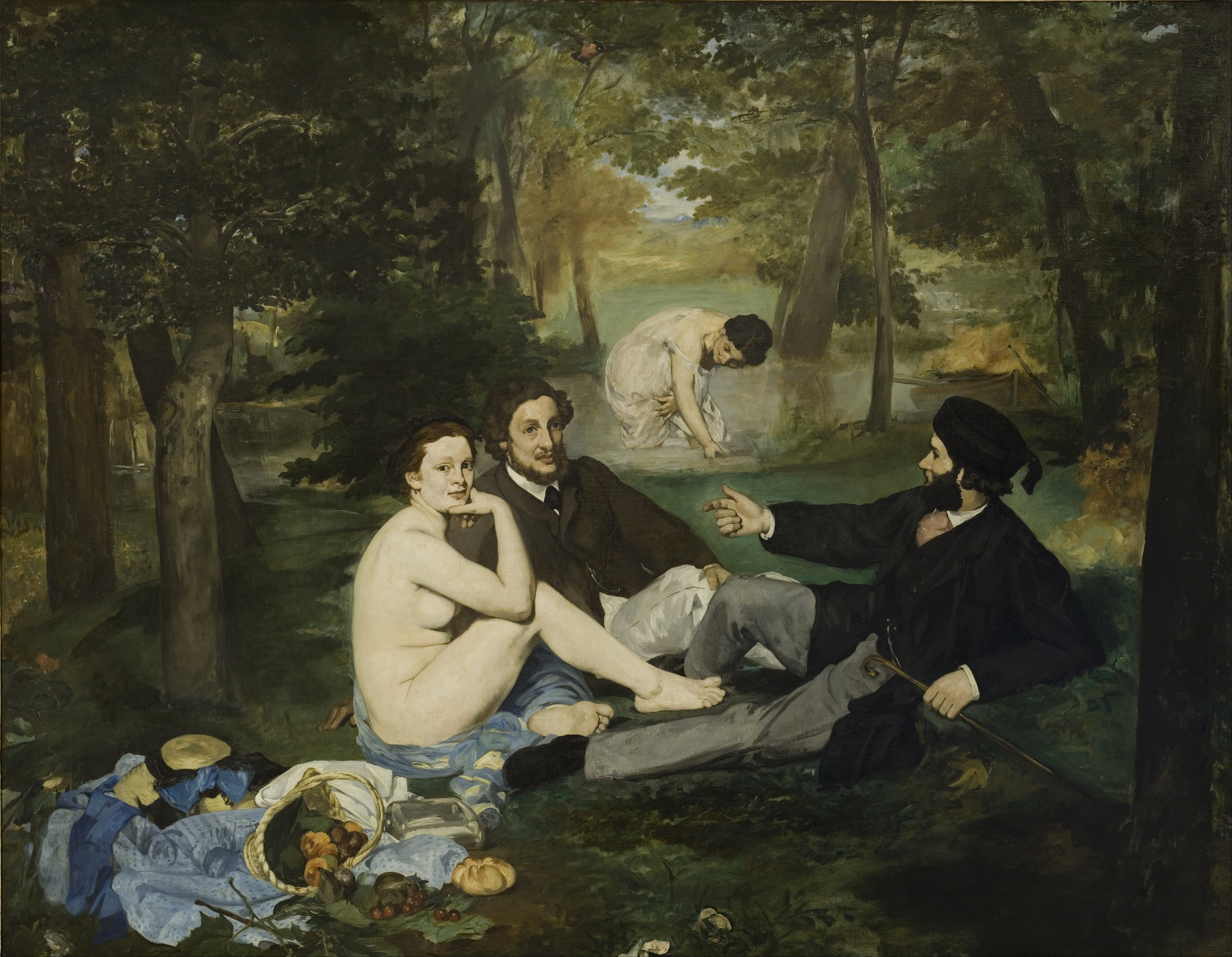
Édouard Manet's painting Déjeuner sur l'herbe is referenced in the episode.

César and Ugolin are named after the peasants from the 1986 French language films Jean de Florette and Manon des Sources. Bart's French gift to Maggie is a reference to Le Ballon Rouge, a short French children's film. On the way to the chateau, Bart and Ugolin cycle past scenes depicted in several famous paintings, notably Bassin aux nymphéas by Claude Monet, Champ de blé aux corbeaux by Vincent van Gogh, Le rêve by Henri Rousseau and Déjeuner sur l'herbe by Édouard Manet.

A similar scandal involving the use of anti-freeze in wine emerged from Austria and West Germany in 1985.

Because the show received separate dub tracks for European French and Canadian French, the dialogue of the scene involving Bart seeking a gendarme's help was slightly altered. In the European French dub, Bart and the policeman both speak the same language, thus the impasse is that Bart initially seeks help about his two-month obligation to his host family and the policeman minimizes the matter, but then Bart gets inspiration to stress the wine poisoning to get help. In the Canadian French dub, Bart speaks Quebecois slang that the French gendarme does not understand, and Bart initially mutters, "I thought they spoke French in France." Bart then figures out he must speak to the officer in a stereotypical Parisian French accent to make himself understood.

== Reception ==
In its original American broadcast, "The Crepes of Wrath" finished 29th for the week with a Nielsen rating of 15.9, the second highest rated show on Fox. "The Crepes of Wrath" received generally positive reviews from critics. Gary Russell and Gareth Roberts, the authors of the book I Can't Believe It's a Bigger and Better Updated Unofficial Simpsons Guide, said the episode was a "Tour de Force" and that this was "perhaps the first episode to make the viewer's jaw drop at the audacity and invention of the series' makers".

In a DVD review of the first season, David B. Grelck rated this episode a 2 1/2 (of 5), adding: "while the laughs are a bit dry in this episode, the over-the-top plot is indicative of zaniness to come". Colin Jacobson at DVD Movie Guide said in a review that "it's clear that the writers had started to find their groove by the time this episode was produced. From start to finish, 'Crepes' offered a solid experience, as the show began to feature more style and subtlety." Scott Collura at Hollywood Video praised the episode in a review, saying "it is one of the best of the first season."

In 1997, David Bauder from TV Guide named this episode the greatest episode of The Simpsons, and the 17th greatest episode of any television show of all time. In 2006, IGN listed "The Crepes of Wrath" as the best episode of the first season, saying it "features a strong central storyline, with Bart being shipped off to France as an exchange student and being forced to work for two unscrupulous winemakers [who] mix antifreeze in their wine". The episode's reference to Le Ballon Rouge was named the third greatest film reference in the history of the show by Nathan Ditum of Total Film.

In Planet Simpson, author Chris Turner notes that many of the episode's French characters and settings are derived largely from American stereotypes of France, writing "[Caeser and Ugolin] are perfect embodiments of the stereotypical Frenchman so loathed in the United States."
