= I Married Marge =

- The Simpsons episode
- Homer leaves Marge to look for work. Marge was designed with shorter hair to make her look younger. The characters' pupils were larger than normal in the episode, and their eyeballs were unusually round and big.
- Episode no.: Season 3 Episode 12
- Directed by: Jeffrey Lynch
- Written by: Jeff Martin
- Production code: 8F10
- Original air date: December 26, 1991

Episode features
- Chalkboard gag: "I will not torment the emotionally frail"
- Couch gag: The family (except Maggie) cartwheel into place and strikes a pose. Maggie hops onto the couch and joins them, striking the same pose.
- Commentary: Matt Groening; James L. Brooks; Al Jean; Mike Reiss; Dan Castellaneta; Jeff Martin; Jeffrey Lynch

Episode chronology
← Previous "Burns Verkaufen der Kraftwerk"	Next → "Radio Bart"
- The Simpsons season 3

"I Married Marge" is the twelfth episode of the third season of the American animated television series The Simpsons. It originally aired on Fox in the United States on December 26, 1991. In the episode, Marge worries that she may be pregnant again and visits Dr. Hibbert's office. While anxiously waiting at home, Homer tells Bart, Lisa, and Maggie the story of his and Marge's marriage and Bart's birth. The episode was written by Jeff Martin and directed by Jeffrey Lynch.

"I Married Marge" was the second flashback episode of The Simpsons after season two's "The Way We Was", which focused on how Homer and Marge met. It features cultural references to The Empire Strikes Back, Charlie's Angels, and Ms. Pac-Man. The title of the episode is a play on the American television series I Married Joan. Since airing, "I Married Marge" has received mostly positive reviews from television critics. It acquired a Nielsen rating of 11.9 and was the highest-rated show on Fox the week it aired.

The episode was the first of three about the births of the Simpsons children, this one covering Bart's birth, with Lisa's covered in "Lisa's First Word" in the fourth season, and Maggie's covered in the sixth-season episode "And Maggie Makes Three". The episode also expands upon the family's origins as a result of Marge falling pregnant with Bart, briefly referred to in "The Way We Was", and introduces key moments, such as Bart's conception at a mini-golf course, which would ultimately become a major part of the series' canon.

== Plot ==
Marge worries she may be pregnant again after a home pregnancy test is inconclusive, so she drives to Dr. Hibbert's office to take another test. While Marge is gone, Homer tells Bart, Lisa, and Maggie the story of their marriage and Bart's birth.

In 1980, Homer is working at a mini golf course while dating Marge. Some time after having sex inside a castle on the golf course, Marge discovers she is pregnant and tells Homer. Homer proposes marriage to Marge, and she accepts. They get married at a seedy wedding chapel across the state line and spend their wedding night on the living room couches at the Bouvier family's house.

Homer discovers his wages from the golf course are insufficient to support his growing family. He applies for a job at the Springfield Nuclear Power Plant, but he does not get the job, partially because of his lack of experience with nuclear technology, and partially because Smithers favored two other applicants who were members of the same college fraternity as him. Homer gets jobs at several smaller businesses, but he is quickly fired from all of them. Due to financial difficulties, their newly-purchased baby supplies and Marge's wedding ring are repossessed. Feeling guilty, Homer leaves to find steady work, hoping to return once able to support his family. He leaves Marge a note explaining his departure and she is devastated when she reads it.

Patty and Selma eat at a fast-food restaurant where they see Homer working there as a cashier. Selma feels compelled to inform Marge, but Patty, who hates Homer, advises her not to. When Selma sees how devastated Marge is, she tells her about Homer's job. Homer and Marge reconcile, and Homer goes to the power plant, barges into Mr. Burns's office, and vigorously tells Burns that if he was hired at the power plant, he would be unwaveringly subservient. Impressed, Burns hires Homer.

At the hospital, Homer announces that he has found work at the plant, allowing him to pay for Bart's imminent delivery. Bart uses Homer's cigarette lighter to set his tie on fire.

After Homer ends his flashback, he tells Bart, Lisa and Maggie he is blessed to have such children and does not regret having them. Regardless, when Marge arrives back with the news she is not pregnant, Homer and Marge share a celebratory high-five.

== Production ==
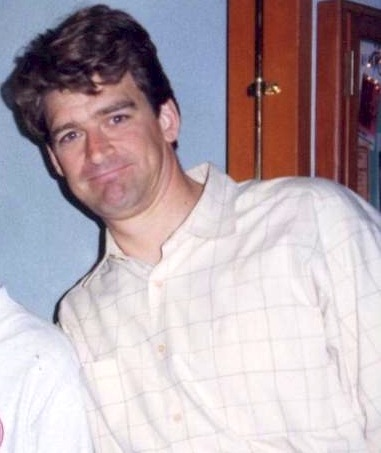
The episode was written by Jeff Martin.

"I Married Marge" was written by Jeff Martin and directed by Jeffrey Lynch. It was the second flashback episode of The Simpsons and a sequel to the previous one, "The Way We Was", which tells the story of how Homer and Marge met in high school. Executive producer Sam Simon was concerned that the writers were being "inefficient" with the episode; he thought the three plots of Homer and Marge's marriage, the birth of Bart, and Homer getting his job should have been extended into three episodes instead of one.

The staff were concerned over the animation of the characters' eyes in the episode, as the pupils were larger than normal, making the characters look "stoned", and the eyeballs were "too round" and large. The animation artists at the animation studio in South Korea, where much of the animation process takes place, had begun stenciling the eyes with a template, which according to Lynch resulted in "strangely round eyes which look a little too big sometimes and much too perfect. Which is very un-Simpsons like." Marge was designed with shorter hair in the flashback sequences to make her appear younger. Lynch thought it was nice to see Marge in a "younger, more attractive mode, and sort of watching her progress through pregnancy."

== Cultural references ==
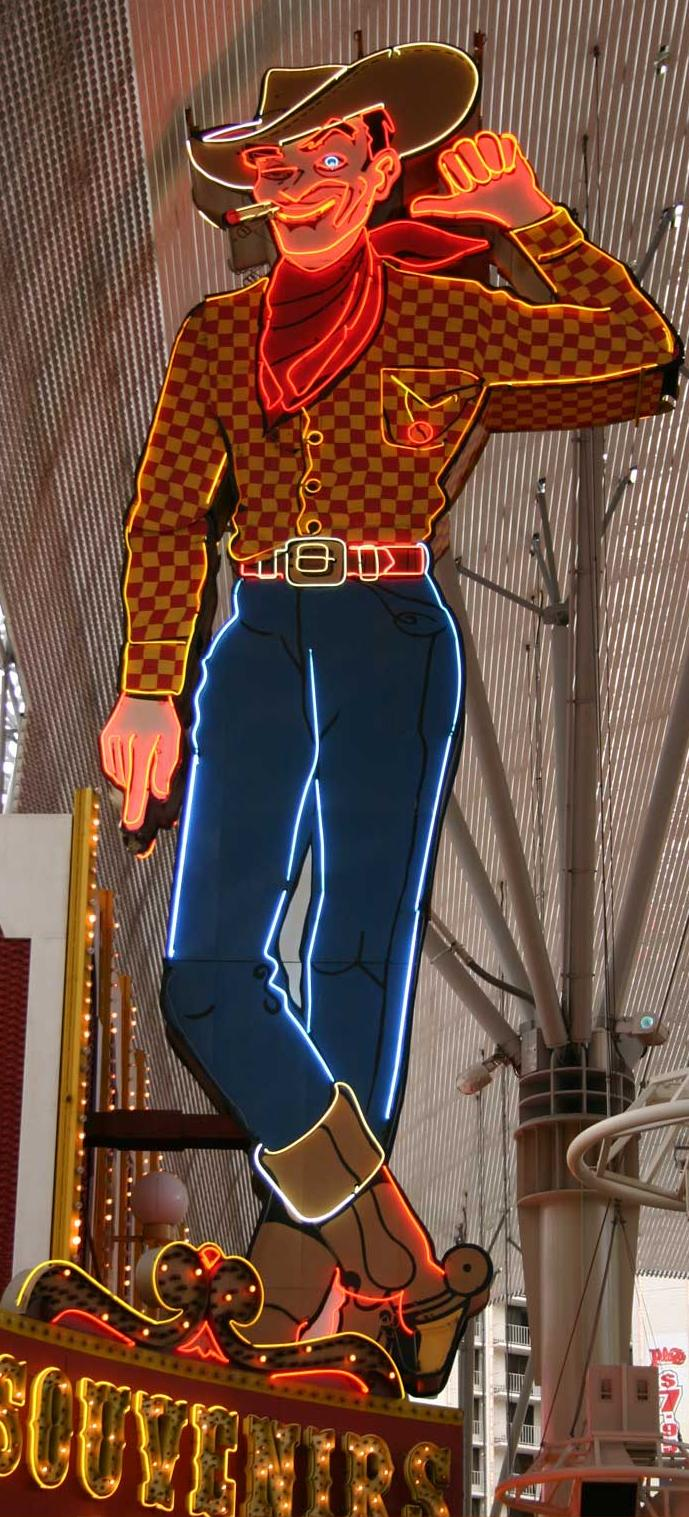
The Vegas Vic sign

The title of the episode is a reference to the American television series I Married Joan. Marge and Homer sing along to "You Light Up My Life" by Debby Boone in the car. When Marge is suspected to be pregnant, Bart wants to name the baby after rapper Kool Moe Dee, while Lisa wants to name her after Ariel, from The Little Mermaid. At the beginning of his story, Homer mentions the band Supertramp, and their popularity in the time period. While exiting the movie theater, Homer spoils the ending of The Empire Strikes Back for dozens of moviegoers awaiting the next show. He tells Marge "You're as pretty as Princess Leia and as smart as Yoda."

Homer's encounter with the doughnut delivery man is a reference to a scene in the film Willy Wonka & the Chocolate Factory. Homer and his best friend Barney Gumble are watching Charlie's Angels when Marge tells the news of her pregnancy. A poster of Farrah Fawcett, a cast member of Charlie's Angels, hangs on the wall in Barney's apartment. Dolly Parton's "9 to 5" is heard when Homer looks for a new job. The sign outside the wedding chapel resembles Vegas Vic from the Pioneer Club in Las Vegas. When Homer returns to the power plant to apply for a job the second time, Mr. Burns is seen playing the arcade game Ms. Pac-Man. The episode marks the first appearance of Burns's assistant Smithers's first name, Waylon, which comes from the puppeteer Wayland Flowers. When Homer is working at the Gulp N' Blow, he is wearing an "I Shot J.R." T-shirt, a reference to the Who Shot J.R.? storyline in Dallas in 1980, which would later provide inspiration for the two-part "Who Shot Mr. Burns?" episode in 1995.

== Reception ==
In its original American broadcast on December 26, 1991, "I Married Marge" finished 27th in the ratings for the week of December 23–29, 1991, with a Nielsen rating of 11.9, equivalent to approximately 11 million viewing households. It was the highest-rated show on Fox that week. Marge's voice actor, Julie Kavner, received a Primetime Emmy Award for Outstanding Voice-Over Performance in 1992 for her performance in the episode.

Since airing, the episode has received very positive reviews from television critics. Pete Oliva of North Texas Daily praised the writers for providing back stories that are "believable" and do not feel "contrived or hastily thought through". The authors of the book I Can't Believe It's a Bigger and Better Updated Unofficial Simpsons Guide, Gary Russell and Gareth Roberts, thought it was a "moving" episode with "plenty of great setpieces".

DVD Movie Guide's Colin Jacobson described the episode as "sweet and funny" and a "nice piece of Simpsons history". Jacobson went on to say he enjoyed the flashback concept and that the episode develops the characters "nicely" and gives the viewers "a good sense for the era in which it takes place". Nate Meyers of Digitally Obsessed rated it a 5 (of 5), and highlighted the scenes with Marge's sisters Patty and Selma, "barraging Homer with insults", as the "funniest moments" of the episode. Meyers added: "The episode's climax is a great moment for Homer and fans of the show." Molly Griffin of The Observer said "I Married Marge" is one of the season three episodes that turned the show into "the cultural force it is today".

In his book Drawn to Television – Prime-time Animation from the Flintstones to Family Guy, Keith Booker wrote: "The episode details in a rather sentimental fashion the early struggles of the irresponsible Homer to support his new family [...] Such background episodes add an extra dimension to the portrayal of the animated Simpson family, making them seem oddly real and adding weight to their status as a family with a long history together." Nathan Rabin writes that the episode "presents such an unflinching, unsparing yet poignant and wonderfully human portrayal of young parenthood that when the pregnancy test finally turns up negative it is a cause for rapt celebration. That’s parenthood: the gift and the curse. The thing that ruins your life and gives it meaning. 'I Married Marge' powerfully captures that duality in a way that illustrates indelibly why we feel for The Simpsons in a way that would be unimaginable with Family Guy. It’s not just funny. It has a soul."
