= Homer Badman =

- The Simpsons episode
- Episode no.: Season 6 Episode 9
- Directed by: Jeffrey Lynch
- Written by: Greg Daniels
- Production code: 2F06
- Original air date: November 27, 1994

Guest appearance
- Dennis Franz as himself

Episode features
- Chalkboard gag: "I will not whittle hall passes out of soap"
- Couch gag: The family chases the couch and back wall down a long and portal-type hallway.
- Commentary: Matt Groening; David Mirkin; Greg Daniels; Julie Kavner; Jeffrey Lynch; David Silverman

Episode chronology
← Previous "Lisa on Ice"	Next → "Grampa vs. Sexual Inadequacy"
- The Simpsons season 6

"Homer Badman" is the ninth episode of the sixth season of the American animated television series The Simpsons. It originally aired on Fox in the United States on November 27, 1994. In the episode, Homer is falsely accused of sexual harassment and must prove his innocence. Dennis Franz guest stars as himself, portraying a fictionalized and exaggerated version of Homer in a television film called Homer S: Portrait of an Ass-Grabber.

The episode was written by Greg Daniels and directed by Jeffrey Lynch.

== Plot ==
Homer has acquired tickets to a candy-centric trade show and decides to take Marge with him as she hires Ashley Grant, a feminist graduate student, to babysit their children. Homer outfits Marge with an oversized trench coat in order to smuggle out as much candy as possible. At the trade show, Homer attempts to steal a rare gummy modeled after the Venus de Milo. When caught in the act, Homer creates a makeshift explosive out of Pop Rocks and a can of Buzz Cola to provide cover while he and Marge escape.

That night, Homer somehow loses the gummy Venus and frantically searches for it until Marge reminds him to drive Ashley home. As she exits Homer's car, he sees the gummy stuck to her pants. Mesmerized, Homer seizes the confection and Ashley turns around to see him drooling at it. Misinterpreting this as a sexual advance, a horrified Ashley runs off.

The next morning, an angry mob of college students led by Ashley marches onto the Simpsons' lawn, falsely accusing Homer of sexual harassment; he attempts to explain that he did not mean to, but the students refuse to believe him. The tabloid television program Rock Bottom airs an interview with Homer that is selectively, albeit poorly edited and presented out of context to make him look like a crazed pervert, further tarnishing his reputation. The resulting media circus soon monitors Homer's movements around the clock.

Homer is then encouraged to videotape his side of the story for a public-access cable television channel, but since it airs during a graveyard timeslot, few viewers see it and it only succeeds in angering a penny-farthing enthusiast. Groundskeeper Willie, who enjoys shooting and watching amateur videos, sees Homer's tape and showcases videotaped evidence of what actually happened the night Homer drove Ashley home. Once she sees it, Ashley apologizes for the misunderstanding and Homer is exonerated afterwards, whereas Rock Bottom proceeds to make Willie's videotaping exploits the target of the next media circus. Having learned nothing from his experience, Homer chooses to lambast Willie, much to Marge's annoyance.

== Production ==
Greg Daniels, the writer of the episode, originally pitched this episode as being more centered on Lisa's and Homer's opposing ideas on feminism. Eventually, the episode became more of a satire of tabloid media, such as Hard Copy. David Mirkin, the show runner at the time, felt very strongly about the "tabloidization of the media" and has said that the episode was as current in 2005 as it was when it first aired and things have since gotten worse. Several gags in the episode are based on what real life shows like Hard Copy would do, such as making people look to be guilty without a trial as well as creating a complete invasion of privacy by setting up camp outside people's homes. The talk show "Ben", which is hosted by a bear named "Gentle Ben" wearing a microphone on its head, reflects the writers' feeling that anyone could host a talk show because all they need is a microphone and an audience.

Dennis Franz was the writers' second choice for the actor portraying Homer in the television dramatization. According to the DVD commentary, the original actor was more "barrel-chested".

== Cultural references ==
At the candy-centric trade show, an intercom announcement says the front desk is "Looking for Mr. Goodbar" and the escape sequence was "based on every Bruce Willis movie ever made". Bart inquires about the actions of Coppertone's puppy being related to sexual harassment and Homer's fantasy of living underwater is a parody of the "Under the Sea" sequence from Disney's The Little Mermaid. The episode additionally includes parodies of Hard Copy, Sally Jessy Raphael, the Late Show with David Letterman, Gentle Ben and media coverage of the O. J. Simpson standoff. At the end of the episode, the Rock Bottom dubs Groundskeeper Willie as "Rowdy Roddy Peeper", a reference to professional wrestler Rowdy Roddy Piper. Like Willie, Piper's gimmick was that of a stereotypical Scot.

== Reception ==
In its original broadcast, "Homer Badman" finished 50th in ratings for the week of November 21–27, 1994, with a Nielsen rating of 9.5, equivalent to approximately 9.1 million viewing households. It was the highest-rated show on the Fox network that week, beating Married... with Children. In the United Kingdom, "Homer Badman" is the earliest episode of The Simpsons to receive a 12 certificate for home release by the British Board of Film Classification; previous episodes remain certificated at U or PG.

According to David Mirkin, the episode is very highly ranked among Simpsons fans.

In Entertainment Weekly's top 25 The Simpsons episodes list, compiled in 2003, "Homer Badman" was placed eighteenth. The Daily Telegraph characterized the episode as one of "The 10 Best Simpsons TV Episodes".

In 2003, during the first meeting between Ricky Gervais, co-creator and star of The Office, and writer of "Homer Badman" Greg Daniels, the former revealed that it was his favorite episode of The Simpsons. Daniels would go on to adapt The Office for American television.
