= Krusty Gets Busted =

- The Simpsons episode
- Episode no.: Season 1 Episode 12
- Directed by: Brad Bird
- Written by: Jay Kogen; Wallace Wolodarsky
- Production code: 7G12
- Original air date: April 29, 1990

Guest appearance
- Kelsey Grammer as Sideshow Bob

Episode features
- Chalkboard gag: "They are laughing at me, not with me"
- Couch gag: Maggie pops out of the couch, and lands in Marge's arms.
- Commentary: Matt Groening; Brad Bird; Jay Kogen; Wallace Wolodarsky

Episode chronology
← Previous "The Crepes of Wrath"	Next → "Some Enchanted Evening"
- The Simpsons season 1

"Krusty Gets Busted" is the twelfth and penultimate episode of the first season of the American animated television series The Simpsons. It originally aired on Fox in the United States on April 29, 1990. The episode was written by Jay Kogen and Wallace Wolodarsky and directed by Brad Bird. In the episode, Krusty the Clown is convicted of armed robbery of the Kwik-E-Mart. Believing that Krusty has been framed for it, Bart and Lisa investigate the crime and learn that Krusty's sidekick, Sideshow Bob, is the culprit.

This episode marks the first full-fledged appearance of Kent Brockman. Kelsey Grammer makes his first guest appearance on the show as the voice of Sideshow Bob, who would become a recurring antagonist in the series.

== Plot ==
Marge asks Homer to pick up ice cream from the Kwik-E-Mart on the way home from work; Homer obliges and while there, he sees a man resembling Krusty the Clown committing a robbery. After he identifies Krusty in a police lineup, the latter is arrested and convicted, much to the grief of Bart. Taking advantage of the public outrage over Krusty's apparent criminal turn, Apu begins marketing a "clown-repelling" machine gun, while Reverend Lovejoy arranges a bonfire that Springfield's residents use to dispose of Krusty's merchandise. In Krusty's absence, his sidekick Sideshow Bob becomes the new host of his show, rechristening it as The Side-Show Bob Cavalcade of Whimsy, which focuses on education and classic literature while retaining The Itchy & Scratchy Show. Refusing to accept that his idol could have committed a crime, Bart enlists Lisa's help to prove Krusty's innocence.

At the crime scene, Bart and Lisa recall that the robber read a magazine and used a microwave oven, which Krusty could not have done as he is illiterate and has an artificial pacemaker, which requires him to avoid microwave radiation. When the duo and Maggie visit Sideshow Bob to learn whether Krusty had any enemies, he gives them tickets to his show. During the live broadcast, Bart is invited on stage with Bob, who dismisses Bart's points about the microwave and magazine. When Bob says he has "big shoes to fill", Bart remembers when Homer stepped on the robber's foot during his robbery, making him react in pain. Despite wearing clown shoes, Krusty has small feet and would not have felt Homer stepping on them. Bart deduces that Sideshow Bob is the culprit, since he had the most to gain from Krusty's downfall and his large feet literally fill his own shoes. To prove this to the audience, Bart hits one of Bob's feet with a mallet and reveals their size as he reacts in pain.

While watching the show, the police realize they failed to notice this evidence and head to the studio to arrest Bob, who confesses that he framed Krusty out of frustration for being on the receiving end of the clown's humiliating gags and felt that his true potential was wasted on his show. Now released following his exoneration, Krusty regains the trust of the townspeople, including Homer and Chief Wiggum, who apologize for their respective mistakes, as he thanks Bart for his help. Bart hangs an autographed picture of the event in his bedroom, which is refilled with Krusty decor and merchandise.

== Production ==
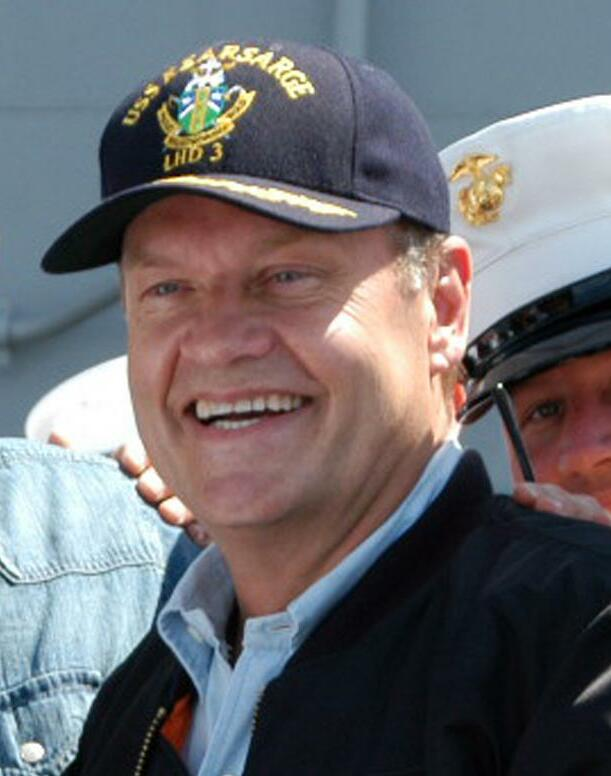
"Krusty Gets Busted" is the first episode guest starring Kelsey Grammer as the voice of Sideshow Bob.

Director Brad Bird wanted to open the episode with a close-up of Krusty's face. The staff liked the idea, and he then suggested that all three acts of the episode, defined by the placement of the commercial breaks, should begin with a close-up shot. Act one begins with Krusty's face introducing the audience at his show, act two begins with Krusty's face being locked up behind bars, and act three begins with Sideshow Bob's face on a big poster. Krusty's character is based on a television clown from Portland, Oregon called Rusty Nails, whom The Simpsons creator Matt Groening watched while growing up in Portland. The original teleplay, written by Jay Kogen and Wallace Wolodarsky, was seventy-eight pages long and many scenes had to be cut. One scene that had to be cut down was the scene where Patty and Selma show the slideshow of their vacation; it originally contained images of them being detained for bringing heroin into America.

"Krusty Gets Busted" is not only Sideshow Bob's second appearance on The Simpsons, but his first major role in the series. He originally appeared as a minor character in the season one episode "The Telltale Head". In that appearance, his design was simpler and his hair was round. However, near the end of the episode, he appears with his more familiar hairstyle. Bob's design was updated for "Krusty Gets Busted" and the animators tried to redo his scenes in "The Telltale Head" with the re-design, but did not have enough time. The script for "Krusty Gets Busted" called for James Earl Jones to voice Bob, but the producers instead went with Kelsey Grammer, a cast member on Cheers at the time. Grammer based Bob's voice on that of theater director Ellis Rabb. Kent Brockman, Judge Snyder and Scott Christian make their first appearances on The Simpsons in this episode.

== Cultural references ==
Chief Wiggum's order during the suspect line-up to "send in the clowns" is an allusion to the Stephen Sondheim song "Send in the Clowns" from the 1973 musical A Little Night Music. The Sondheim musical took its name from Mozart's Serenade No. 13 for strings in G major, Eine kleine Nachtmusik, which is the theme tune to Sideshow Bob's show. The close up shot of Krusty's face behind bars in the beginning of act two is a reference of the closing credit motif of the British television series The Prisoner from the 1960s. The background music in that scene resembles the theme of the television series Mission: Impossible at one point. Sideshow Bob is reading The Man in the Iron Mask by Alexandre Dumas to the studio audience. The song "Ev'ry Time We Say Goodbye" by Cole Porter is featured in the episode. Following Sideshow Bob's arrest, he mutters to the Simpsons children, "And I would've gotten away with it too, if it weren't for these meddling kids", which is a reference to a catchphrase from Hanna-Barbera's Scooby-Doo franchise, which was airing on ABC as A Pup Named Scooby-Doo when this episode aired.

== Reception ==
In its original American broadcast, "Krusty Gets Busted" finished 13th in the ratings for the week of April 23–29, 1990, with a Nielsen rating of 16.4. It was the highest rated show on the Fox network that week. The episode received generally positive reviews from critics. Gary Russell and Gareth Roberts, the authors of the book I Can't Believe It's a Bigger and Better Updated Unofficial Simpsons Guide, praised the episode: "The invention of the Simpsons' arch enemy as a lugubrious yet psychotic Englishman in dreadlocks succeeds wonderfully in this super-fast, super-funny episode that works by constantly reversing the audience's expectations."

In a DVD review of the first season, David B. Grelck rated this episode a 3 (of 5). Colin Jacobson at DVD Movie Guide said in a review that "throughout the episode we found great material; it really seemed clear that the show was starting to turn into the piece we now know and love. It's hard for me to relate any deficiencies" and added that "almost every Bob episode offers a lot of fun, and this episode started that trend in fine style." Screen Rant called it the best episode of the first season. Series creator Matt Groening listed it as his ninth favorite episode of The Simpsons and added "I have a peculiar love of TV clownery".
