= Puffless =

- The Simpsons episode
- Episode no.: Season 27; Episode 3
- Directed by: Rob Oliver
- Written by: J. Stewart Burns
- Production code: TABF19
- Original air date: October 11, 2015

Guest appearances
- Jon Lovitz as Cigarette; Yo-Yo Ma as himself

Episode features
- Couch gag: Each Simpson is a car that parks a spot on the couch until Maggie, who is a monster truck runs them over.

Episode chronology
← Previous "Cue Detective"	Next → "Halloween of Horror"
- The Simpsons season 27

"Puffless" is the third episode of the twenty-seventh season of the American animated television series The Simpsons, and the 577th episode of the series overall. The episode was directed by Rob Oliver and written by J. Stewart Burns. It aired in the United States on Fox on October 11, 2015.

In this episode, Patty and Selma try to quit smoking after learning their father died of lung cancer. Musician Yo-Yo Ma appeared as himself. The episode received negative reviews.

== Plot ==
Homer, Bart, Lisa, Maggie and Grampa are watching a Dr. Nick program (who did not realize his patient was pregnant and even mistook the umbilical cord for an astronaut tether) when Marge turns off the TV and tells them that it is her mother Jacqueline's 80th birthday and the family should visit her. Homer is reluctant to go, claiming that the Bouviers hate him, but does so for Marge's sake. At Jacqueline's house, while watching slides which include Marge's father, Clancy, the question about how he died is brought up, something that Marge, Patty and Selma never knew about. Jacqueline reveals the truth: her husband died of lung cancer but she did not say so before because back then, people were reluctant to admit it and she thought smoking made Patty and Selma look cool. This revelation shocks Patty and Selma, who decide to quit smoking once and for all and burn all their cigarettes, which causes Jacqueline's house to burn down.

At the DMV, Patty realizes how hard it is to quit smoking after years of addiction after thinking she was having a stroke. She also realizes that Selma is not affected by the sudden change of habits, and decides to consult Dr. Hibbert. At the hospital, Patty discovers that Selma relapsed ten minutes after quitting smoking. An angry Patty leaves Selma and stays at The Simpsons house for a while. Homer quickly gets annoyed by aspects of Patty's presence in his house such as her snoring while he and Marge are trying to have sex and accidentally seeing Patty in the shower. Meanwhile, at the apartment, Selma tries to decide to either quit smoking and reconcile with Patty, or carry on smoking and lose her sister's respect. She decides to quit smoking and they reconcile.

At the end of the episode, Patty and Selma return to their apartment and quickly notice in the absence of cigarette smoke the noxious odors in a small apartment that include two aging women, a baby and an iguana. They quickly take up smoking again to cover up the odors, though are unsure if it will be a happy ending. A montage of their life and death through smoking is shown as Rick Astley's "Together Forever" is heard in the background. Even after their death, cigarette smoke is seen rising from their graves.

In a secondary plot known as "Maggie's Extraordinary Animal Adventure", Maggie befriends a squirrel who introduces her to other animals such as an owl, an opossum, and a parrot named Hoppy (which is revealed to belong to Duffman). However, Cletus captures the opossum for dinner and puts the captive animal under his dog's surveillance. Maggie makes a plan to fight against the Spucklers and free the opossum by assembling an army of animals. With help from Plopper the Spider-Pig, Maggie and the animals are able to free the opossum and defeat Cletus and his dog before going their separate ways, with Hoppy returning to Duffman, having picked up some of Cletus's phrases.

== Production ==
The subplot involving Maggie is drawn in a different animation style than the rest of the episode.

Executive producer Al Jean asked musician Yo-Yo Ma to be in the episode, and he agreed. Ma and Jean lived in the same dorm while attending Harvard University. Ma was previously drawn in a non-speaking role in the eleventh season episode "Missionary: Impossible." Ma also performed the show's theme song over the closing credits.

== Cultural references ==
Yo-Yo Ma plays the prelude to Bach’s Suite No. 1 in G major. "Together Forever" by Rick Astley plays during the flash forward. Plopper the Pig from The Simpsons Movie is featured during Maggie's storyline.

== Reception ==
The episode received a 1.5 rating and was watched by a total of 3.31 million people, making it the most watched show on Fox that night.

Dennis Perkins of The A.V. Club gave the episode a C, saying "It's exactly half an episode that seeks to tell a character-based story. That's a steep hill to climb under any circumstances, but especially when trying to make us care about two one-note characters like Patty and Selma. Not that there haven't been interesting, affecting Patty and Selma episodes in the past—honestly, Selma's rejection of her sham marriage to secret ichthyophile Troy McClure is one of the most improbably heartbreaking endings in Simpsons history."

Tony Sokol of Den of Geek gave the episode 1.5 out of 5 stars. He called the episode pointless although the quitting smoking plot was a good premise. He also stated that the Maggie subplot should have had its own platform.
