= Who Shot Mr. Burns? =

25th episode of the 6th season and 1st episode of the 7th season of The Simpsons

"Who Shot Mr. Burns? (Part One)"
- The Simpsons episode
- Promotional artwork showing Mr. Burns and potential suspects
- Episode no.: Season 6 Episode 25
- Directed by: Jeff Lynch
- Written by: Bill Oakley; Josh Weinstein
- Production code: 2F16
- Original air date: May 21, 1995

Guest appearance
- Tito Puente as himself

Episode features
- Chalkboard gag: "This is not a clue... or is it?"
- Couch gag: In the style of Hanna-Barbera cartoons, the family attempts to run across a continuously repeating background.
- Commentary: David Mirkin; Bill Oakley; Josh Weinstein; Jeffrey Lynch

Episode chronology
← Previous "Lemon of Troy"	Next → "Who Shot Mr. Burns? (Part Two)"
- The Simpsons season 6

"Who Shot Mr. Burns? (Part Two)"
- The Simpsons episode
- Episode no.: Season 7 Episode 1
- Directed by: Wes Archer
- Written by: Bill Oakley; Josh Weinstein
- Production code: 2F20
- Original air date: September 17, 1995

Guest appearance
- Tito Puente as himself

Episode features
- Chalkboard gag: "I will not complain about the solution when I hear it"
- Couch gag: The Simpsons line up for a mug shot, with the theme to Dragnet.
- Commentary: Matt Groening; David Mirkin; Bill Oakley; Josh Weinstein; Wes Archer; David Silverman

Episode chronology
← Previous "Who Shot Mr. Burns? (Part One)"	Next → "Radioactive Man"
- The Simpsons season 7

"Who Shot Mr. Burns?" is a two-part episode of the American animated television series The Simpsons. "Part One" is the twenty-fifth and final episode of the sixth season and originally aired on Fox in the United States on May 21, 1995, while "Part Two" is the season premiere of the seventh season and aired on Fox on September 17 the same year.

The episodes begin with Springfield Elementary School striking oil, but Mr. Burns steals it, bringing misery to many of Springfield's citizens. "Part One" has a cliffhanger ending where Mr. Burns is shot by an unidentified assailant. In "Part Two", Springfield's police try to find the culprit, with their main suspects being Waylon Smithers and Homer Simpson.

Both episodes were written by Bill Oakley and Josh Weinstein; "Part One" was directed by Jeffrey Lynch and "Part Two" was directed by Wes Archer. Musician Tito Puente guest stars as himself in both parts. "Who Shot Mr. Burns?" was conceived by series creator Matt Groening, and the writing staff decided to turn it into a two-part mystery episode. Part One contains several clues about the identity of the culprit because the writers wanted the mystery to be solvable.

== Plot ==
=== Part One ===
Groundskeeper Willie discovers oil under Springfield Elementary School while attempting to bury a dead gerbil. Principal Skinner and Superintendent Chalmers accept suggestions from students and staff on how to spend their newfound wealth, including hiring Tito Puente as a music teacher per Lisa's suggestion. Mr. Burns disguises himself as a student and tries to trick Skinner into selling him the drilling rights to secure an energy monopoly over Springfield. Skinner is not fooled by the ruse, and Mr. Burns vows revenge.

At the Springfield Nuclear Power Plant, Homer is increasingly upset that Mr. Burns can never remember his name. Marge encourages Homer to send Mr. Burns a box of chocolates with a picture of the Simpson family underneath the candy. However, neither Mr. Burns nor Smithers are interested in the one candy covering Homer's face and discard the box. As a result, Mr. Burns writes a "thank you" card addressed only to Marge, Bart, Lisa, and Maggie, further angering Homer. and when he read the message, He then warned Bart and Lisa to step away before he yells the word fuck, which was then censored by the sound of a church organ.

Meanwhile, Mr. Burns forms a plan to take the school's oil, despite Smithers' disapproval. Mr. Burns establishes a slant drilling operation and beats the school to tapping the oil well, causing the school to lose their claim to the oil and their newfound wealth. Mr. Burns' drilling operation causes distress to many Springfield citizens: Willie and Puente are fired so the school can cut costs; the first burst of oil from Mr. Burns' rig destroys Bart's treehouse and injures Santa's Little Helper; Moe's Tavern is closed due to the harmful fumes from the drilling, enraging Moe and Barney; and the drilling destroys the Springfield Retirement Castle, forcing Grampa to move into his family's house.

Mr. Burns reveals to Smithers that he plans to construct a giant disc that will permanently block out the sun in Springfield, forcing the residents to continuously use the electricity from his plant. Smithers declares Mr. Burns has gone too far; Mr. Burns is shocked by Smithers' disapproval and fires him. Homer, driven to insanity, sneaks into Burns's office and spray paints "I AM HOMER SIMPSON" on the wall. Despite catching Homer in the act, Mr. Burns still fails to remember his name. In a rage, Homer lunges at him and is hauled away by security guards. Many of the citizens affected by Mr. Burns's schemes, including Homer and Smithers, swear vengeance.

A town meeting is held to discuss Mr. Burns' actions, where several citizens are armed with guns. Mr. Burns arrives, armed with his own gun after his encounter with Homer, and activates the sun-blocking device. Afterwards, he walks into a parking lot and struggles with an unseen and unheard figure. A gun fires and Mr. Burns stumbles and collapses onto the town's sundial, falling into unconsciousness. The townspeople find him and Marge mentions that almost everyone in Springfield had the motive and means to shoot Mr. Burns. Chief Wiggum agrees to start the investigation to find the culprit.

=== Part Two ===
While Mr. Burns recovers from his gunshot wound in the Springfield General Hospital, the police search for his assailant. Smithers vaguely remembers shooting someone the night before in a drunken rage. Guilt-ridden, he goes to a confessional in a local church and confesses to the crime. The confessional is revealed to be a police sting, and Smithers is promptly arrested. While passing news reporters on his way to the police station, Smithers says something that Sideshow Mel recognizes from an episode of the fictional Comedy Central program, Pardon My Zinger, that aired at the same time as the shooting. Mel realizes Smithers must have watched it as well, giving him an alibi. Mel and Krusty head to the police station as Smithers' memory clears: it turns out he had actually shot Jasper in his wooden leg. Meanwhile, the townspeople pull down the sun-blocker, which crushes Shelbyville, to their delight.

With one of the prime suspects cleared, the police, aided by Lisa, eliminate other suspects, including Puente (who had no desire to kill Mr. Burns and instead composed a song expressing his hatred of Mr. Burns), Skinner (who had planned on killing Mr. Burns but had an awkward encounter with Chalmers in the bathroom at the time of the shooting), Willie (who claimed that he was physically incapable of operating a firearm due to excessively playing Space Invaders in 1977), and Moe (the police hook him up to a polygraph, which confirms he did not shoot Mr. Burns).

Wiggum finds an eyelash on Mr. Burns' suit that matches Simpson DNA. At the same time, Mr. Burns wakes up from his coma, exclaiming "Homer Simpson!"; the police assume Burns was remembering who shot him. They raid the Simpson home and find a gun under the seat of their car, covered with Homer's fingerprints and loaded with bullets matching the one fired at Burns; subsequently, they arrest Homer for attempted murder. While at Krusty Burger, Wiggum inadvertently crashes the wagon after leaning out the window to collect his order, and Homer escapes. Smithers offers a $50,000 reward for Homer's capture.

At the hospital, it is revealed that "Homer Simpson" is the only thing Burns can say. Lisa returns to the scene of the crime to investigate. At the same time, Homer arrives at the hospital to confront Mr. Burns. A police bulletin reports Homer's location and an angry mob of citizens rush to the hospital. The citizens enter Mr. Burns' room and discover Homer shaking Mr. Burns. Mr. Burns regains his ability to speak normally, but he instantly forgets Homer's name; Homer becomes enraged, grabs Chief Wiggum's pistol and threatens to kill Mr. Burns unless Mr. Burns retracts his accusation that Homer shot him. Mr. Burns calms Homer down and confirms Homer did not shoot him. He reveals the true assailant upon seeing her in the crowd of citizens: Maggie Simpson.

After leaving the town meeting, Mr. Burns came across Maggie eating a lollipop in the Simpsons' car. He decided to try stealing the candy from the baby, but struggled against Maggie. As Burns took the lollipop, his gun slipped from its holster into Maggie's hands and discharged. The gun fell beneath the car seat, where Homer would unknowingly leave his fingerprints on it while reaching under the seat for an ice cream cone he dropped. Mr. Burns demands for Maggie to be arrested, but Chief Wiggum refuses and says no jury in the world would convict a baby for a crime, except for "maybe Texas". Marge also adds the shooting must have been an accident, considering Maggie is an infant. However, immediately following Marge's statement, Maggie's eyes shift, implying that she shot Mr. Burns intentionally.

== Production ==
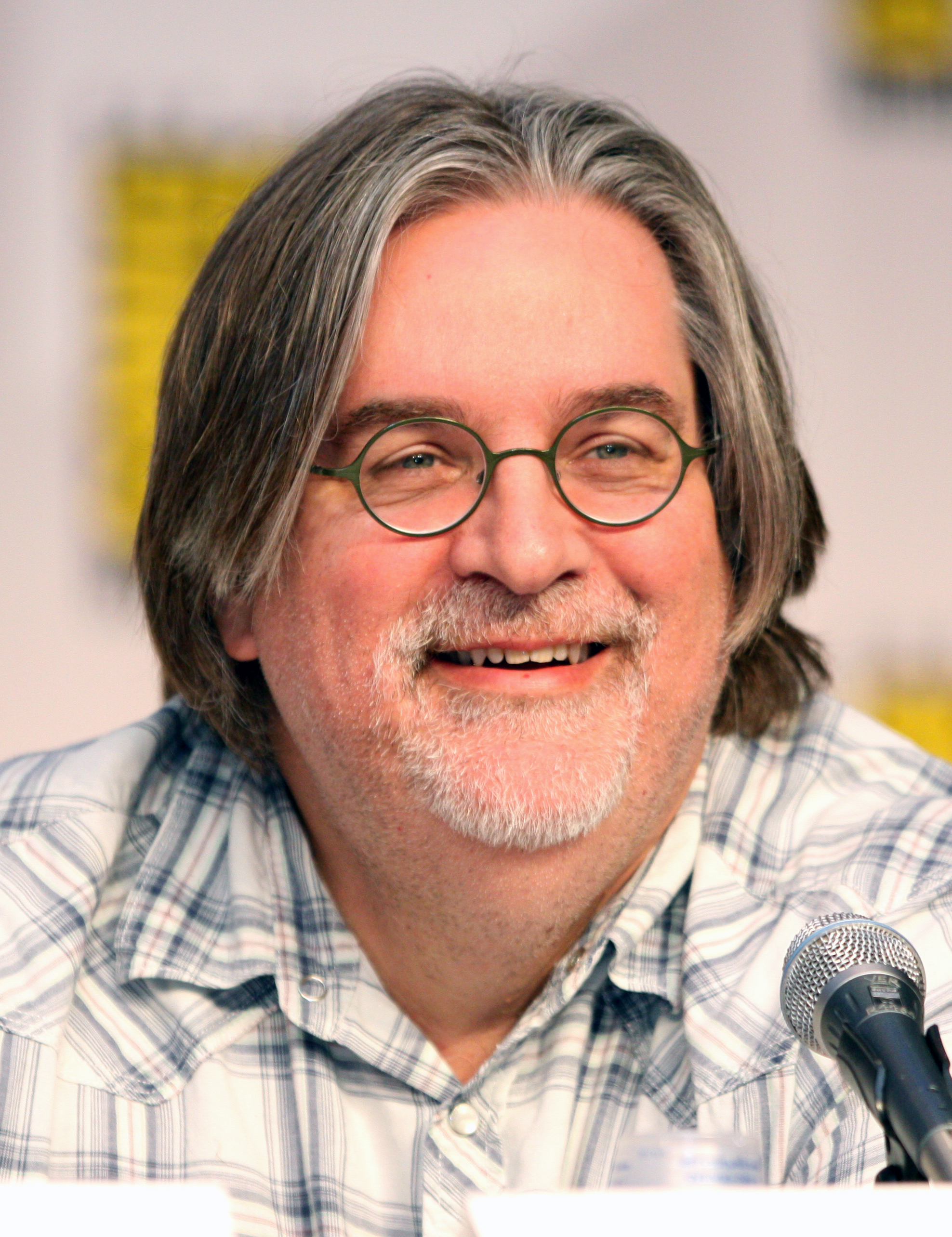
Matt Groening came up with the idea for the episode.

The idea for the episode came from The Simpsons creator Matt Groening, who had wanted to do an episode in which Mr. Burns was shot, which could be used as a publicity stunt. The writers decided to write the episode in two parts with a mystery that could be used in a contest. It was important for them to design a mystery that had clues, took advantage of freeze frame technology and was structured around one character who seemed to be the obvious culprit. While deciding who the culprit was, Oakley and Weinstein had pitched for Barney Gumble because he was a character that could go to jail and it could change the dynamic of the show. Mirkin suggested Maggie Simpson because he felt it was funnier and wanted the culprit to be a Simpsons family member.

The producers worked hard to keep the ending of the episode a secret. While it was in production, David Silverman was the only animator who knew who the culprit was. Wes Archer was initially unaware of the solution, but directed the episode up until its conclusion. When it was time to animate the ending of the show, Silverman and Archer waited until the end of the summer of 1995 to work on it; realizing that they needed help with the layouts, they started giving various animators small parts to work on without telling them who the culprit was. The table read for the episode also ended before the third act. The writers had wanted the clues that were animated to be just right, so there were many animation retakes. Oakley and Weinstein were initially unsure about having Maggie as the culprit, and it was decided that the episode would end with Maggie shifting her eyes and making it look like it was not a complete accident.

Tito Puente and his Latin jazz ensemble appear in the episode and sing the song "Señor Burns". Oakley and Weinstein were unfamiliar with Puente, but wrote him into the episode due to Groening being a fan of his. They figured he would sing the song, but after discovering that Puente was not a singer, but a drummer, the lyrics were instead sung by one of Puente's band members. His band played their version of The Simpsons Theme over the end credits.

=== Hidden clues ===
One of the most important clues shows Mr. Burns' arms pointing towards W and S on the sundial.

A number of subtle clues, as well as a few red herrings, were planted in "Part One" for viewers to solve the mystery:

- Almost every clock is set at three or nine o'clock. The point of the clocks was to teach the viewer to view the sundial at the end upside down.
- Mr. Burns looks from his balcony and talks about stealing candy from a baby.
- The box of chocolates Homer sends Burns is lined with a Simpsons family photo, and as Burns and Smithers gorge on the candy, Maggie is the first Simpson the audience sees.
- Maggie is briefly seen holding a green lollipop in the car before Burns is shot. He previously spoke about, and was ultimately prevented from, stealing candy from a baby in the episode.
- When Mr. Burns collapses on the sundial, he points at W and S, although from his viewpoint, the W looks like an M.
- Many of the suspects have the letters S and either W or M in their initials, and the intention was that several "obvious" suspects could be eliminated by the letters. Several characters already had names with those initials, but some were made up specifically for this episode.
  - Principal Skinner's full name is revealed to be "W. Seymour Skinner" on a diploma in his office.
  - Smithers's full name is "Waylon Smithers".
  - Mr. Burns calls Santa's Little Helper the "Simpson Mutt".
  - Moe's liquor license reveals his full name to be Moe Szyslak.
  - Melvin Van Horne is known to everyone by his stage name "Sideshow Mel".
  - Grampa's gun is a Smith & Wesson.
- Just before entering Mr. Burns' office to spray paint his name, Homer passes in front of the words "ONLY IN" on the pavement (upside down from the viewer's perspective), and very briefly blocks all of the letters except "NO" and a small arrow pointing at him.
- A television in Moe's Tavern shows that Pardon My Zinger is broadcast on weekdays at 3 p.m. on Comedy Central. It is later revealed that Burns is shot at 3 p.m. Smithers reveals at the meeting that he never misses the show, and afterward is seen heading in the opposite direction that Burns heads.
- During the scene at the town hall, several citizens are seen stroking guns: Smithers and an unidentified woman have revolvers, Moe has a shotgun, Skinner has a semi-automatic pistol with a suppressor attached, and Barney has a derringer. Snake also arrives with a revolver.
- Also during the town hall scene, Mr. Burns smugly asks the townspeople "[W]ho here has the guts to stop me?", followed by a panning shot of the townspeople glaring at Mr. Burns before each looking away in reluctance. During this shot, Maggie, at the bottom of the screen in Marge's arms, was the only one to continue glaring.
- As Mr. Burns collapses on the sundial, it is seen that the holster under his arm is empty. This was inserted as an intentional freeze frame clue to show that he had been shot with his own gun.

=== Alternate endings ===
Due to the amount of interest in the ending of this episode, David Mirkin wrote several "terrible endings" and, with just Harry Shearer, recorded several alternate endings. His original intention was to fool the production staff and also leak the endings to various media outlets, but, much to his surprise, he was unsuccessful. Several endings were animated that showed various characters shooting Mr. Burns; most of these endings aired during the clip show "The Simpsons 138th Episode Spectacular", with various clips showing Barney, Tito, Moe, Apu, and even Santa's Little Helper as the gunmen. There was also a full-length fake conclusion that aired in which Smithers shot Burns and explained his doing so at Burns' bedside after Homer's wild chase, and fell on W and S on the compass, Waylon's initials; Burns then gives Smithers a 5% pay cut for attempting to kill him.

=== Alternate theories ===
Over the years, fan theories have emerged which hypothetically propose that other characters, such as Marge, Lisa, Grandpa, Bart, and Homer, could have shot Mr. Burns instead of Maggie. In April 2020, a viral post compared Krusty's appearance in the final scene of Part One to how Homer looked when he dressed as him in "Homie the Clown", leading some to believe that Homer wanted to frame Krusty for Burns' attempted murder by posing as him. On a Twitter post, Oakley said that this was probably an animation error. In addition, released animation notes for the final scene indicate that Homer was not supposed to appear.

Later episodes of the show have poked fun at the reveal of Maggie as the shooter. In season 9's "The Cartridge Family", Homer incorrectly recalls that Smithers was the culprit, which Lisa grumbles would have made more sense. In the season 18 episode "Revenge Is a Dish Best Served Three Times", Homer casually mentions that he shot Mr. Burns and pinned it on Maggie.

== Contest ==
In the months following the broadcast of "Part One", there was widespread debate among fans of the series as to who shot Mr. Burns. Fox offered a contest to tie in with the mystery, in which callers who dialed 1-800-COLLECT would become eligible to guess the identity of the culprit. It ran from August 13 to September 10, and was also one of the first contests to tie together elements of television and the Internet. Fox launched a new website, Springfield.com, devoted to the mystery that got over 500,000 hits during the summer of 1995. The winner would be animated on an episode of the show.

The competition worked "much differently than most fans would've thought", with staffers including Bill Oakley and Josh Weinstein later criticizing the methodology. The first criterion was that entrants had to have used the sponsoring service, 1-800-COLLECT, over the course of that summer. The service answered the calls and collected participants' personal details for a later return call. Two hundred people were chosen at random from all valid entrants to receive that call and offer a guess, and anyone who either responded incorrectly or failed to answer the call was disqualified. The intent was that a winner would be randomly chosen from all those who gave the correct answer, but none of the 200 call-back recipients did so. One recipient who had answered incorrectly was chosen at random as the contest winner; this individual, Fayla Gibson of Washington D.C., did not watch the show and opted to accept a cash prize in lieu of being animated.

Oakley and Weinstein explained the contest as follows:

"You had to use 1-800-COLLECT and submit your name and the name of the person you were calling, then a pool of eligible people was selected, and it was about 200 people and they were called by MCI -- plus YOU had to be home during the broadcast and the person you had called during the summer also HAD to be home during the broadcast. And not one of the people who they called had the right answer! So somebody was picked randomly from among those eligible. And it was some lady in Washington, D.C., who didn't watch the show. She opted for the cash prize instead of being animated. The end."

The contest was foreshadowed at the end of Part One when Dr. Hibbert, apparently breaking the fourth wall, looks directly at the camera and says: "Well, I couldn't possibly solve this mystery... Can you?" The next shot reveals, however, that he is actually addressing Chief Wiggum.

It is a common misconception that nobody officially solved the mystery from what is often assumed to be a large number of entries. Due to the subsampling methodology of the contest in which a maximum of 200 answers were collected, it remains impossible to know how many people attempted to enter with the correct answer. Nonetheless, on the DVD commentary, Bill Oakley and Josh Weinstein remarked that they knew of only one person who had correctly guessed Maggie was the shooter based on the several clues in the episode. The person had made a post on a Simpsons newsgroup on the same day that Part One first aired and the writers wanted to give them a special gift, but due to the contest regulations, Oakley and Weinstein were unable to contact them until after the contest had concluded. By that time, Oakley was unable to find the anonymous poster due to their use of an ephemeral college email address and on the DVD commentary, Oakley was still searching for the individual to give them a prize.

== Springfield's Most Wanted ==
Springfield's Most Wanted was a TV special hosted by John Walsh, host of America's Most Wanted that aired before Part Two of "Who Shot Mr. Burns?" A parody of Walsh's television series, this special was designed to help people find out who shot Mr. Burns, by laying out the potential clues and identifying the possible suspects. It features opinions from former Los Angeles police chief Daryl Gates and predictions from Dennis Franz, Courtney Thorne-Smith, Kevin Nealon, Chris Elliott, and Andrew Shue. The special also included oddsmaker Jimmy Vaccaro of The Mirage casino and hotel in Las Vegas, who had been taking bets on the shooter's identity; a brief look at the casino's tote board shows Homer as the favorite with 2:1 odds, while Maggie was a longshot at 70:1. It was directed by Bill Brown and written by Jack Parmeter and Bob Bain.

The special was criticized for taking the publicity of the episode too far. Several critics said the special tainted host Walsh's credibility and was described as gimmicky, tacky, and "blatant groveling for viewers". The special averaged an 8.4 Nielsen Rating and finished 50th in the United States in the ratings for the week of September 11–17, 1995.

== Cultural references ==
The title and concept for these two episodes were taken from the series Dallas. In the "Who shot J. R.?" plot line, J. R. Ewing is shot in the season finale. The identity of the assailant was not revealed until the following season, leaving viewers to wonder for months which of Ewing's many enemies was the culprit.

=== Part One ===
When Mr. Burns refers to his package at the beginning of the episode, he states that it "absolutely, positively" has to arrive in Pasadena, California, the following day, a reference to an early FedEx slogan. Mr. Burns turning some knobs to remove the floor and Smithers has to jump to off to reveal a scale model of Springfield underneath the floor is a reference to Auric Goldfinger revealing the scale model of Fort Knox to explain his master plan in the James Bond movie Goldfinger. Mr. Burns jumps onto a lamp-post in the same way Gene Kelly does in the movie musical Singin' in the Rain. The song Mr. Burns sings to a lamp-post echoes the lyrics of Simon & Garfunkel's song "The 59th Street Bridge Song (Feelin' Groovy)". The music that plays during the end credits is a parody of John Williams' Drummers' Salute, which is part of the musical score he composed for Oliver Stone's film JFK. During the scene where Moe's bar is closed, an episode of Mystery Science Theater 3000 is playing on the television in the background following a promotion for the fictional program Pardon My Zinger at 3:00 pm.

=== Part Two ===
Chief Wiggum's dream is a detailed reference to Dale Cooper's interaction with the Man from Another Place in Twin Peaks; the moving shadow in the middle of the curtain is also a reference to that series.

The opening, wherein Smithers realizes that he merely dreamed about shooting Mr. Burns, is a reference to the episode "Blast from the Past" from Dallas, in which the events of the entire ninth season were explained away as being merely a character's dream. The dream itself, in which Smithers and Burns are undercover detectives on the 1960s Speedway racing circuit, parodies The Mod Squad. Groundskeeper Willie's interrogation, mainly him crossing and uncrossing his legs, is a parody of Catherine Tramell (Sharon Stone)'s famous interrogation scene in Basic Instinct. The nightclub is called 'Chez Guevara', a reference to Communist revolutionary Che Guevara.

Homer Simpson in a "Haig in '88" T-shirt

Homer's escape from the overturned paddy wagon is an homage to the 1993 film The Fugitive. Chief Wiggum's dream in which Lisa speaks backwards is, as mentioned above, a reference to Special Agent Dale Cooper's interaction with the Man from Another Place. While recording Lisa's lines for the segment, Yeardley Smith recorded the part backwards; the recording was in turn reversed using phonetic reversal, the same technique used on Twin Peaks itself. Several other parts out of the segment are direct references to the dream, including a moving shadow on the curtain, and Wiggum's hair standing straight up after waking.

A mug shot of a battered and bruised Homer Simpson is shown, in which he is wearing a T-shirt with the campaign slogan "Haig in '88" on it, a reference to Alexander Haig's unsuccessful run for the 1988 Republican Party presidential nomination.

== Reception ==
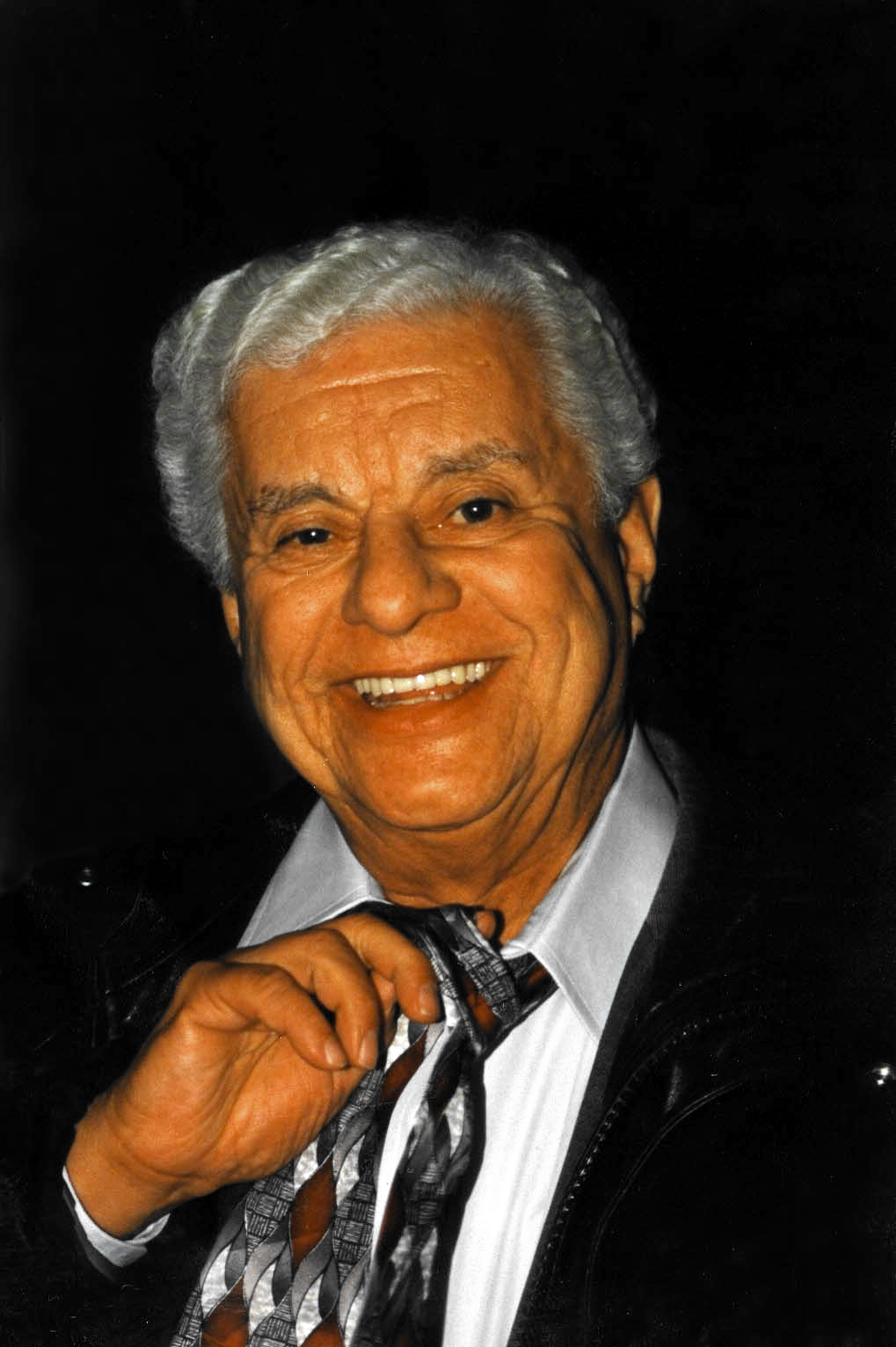
The song "Señor Burns", performed by Tito Puente and his band, was nominated for a Primetime Emmy Award.

Part One finished 51st with a Nielsen rating of 8.7, the fifth-highest-rated Fox show of the week. Part Two averaged 12.3 million households and a 12.9 Nielsen rating. It finished sixteenth in the United States in the ratings for the week of September 11–17, 1995, finishing first in its time slot and was the highest-rated show on the Fox network that week. It helped the Fox network rank third overall for that week at a time when Fox was usually finishing fourth.

In 2003, Entertainment Weekly published a Top 25 The Simpsons episode list and placed both parts of "Who Shot Mr. Burns?" in 25th place, saying, "a two-part comedic homage to Dallas' Who shot J.R.? stunt, [Who Shot Mr. Burns] is perhaps The Simpsons' most grandiose pop moment ever". The Daily Telegraph characterized the episode as one of "The 10 Best Simpsons TV Episodes". Entertainment.ie named it among the 10 greatest Simpsons episodes of all time. When The Simpsons began streaming on Disney+ in 2019, Oakley named "Part One" one of the best classic Simpsons episodes to watch on the service.

The authors of the book I Can't Believe It's a Bigger and Better Updated Unofficial Simpsons Guide, Gary Russell and Gareth Roberts, called it "A superb end to the season—and what's more, it's a genuine whodunnit. There's no cheating—all the clues are there." Jake Rossen of Wizard called the ending the sixth-greatest cliffhanger of all time but expressed disappointment in the resolution, saying: "Sometimes it's better to make up your own ending, kids." In 2008, Entertainment Weekly included Part One in their list of the best television season finales of all time.

The song "Señor Burns", which was composed by Alf Clausen and written by Oakley and Weinstein, was nominated for a Primetime Emmy Award in 1996 for "Outstanding Individual Achievement in Music and Lyrics". Tito Puente ranked 19th on AOL's list of their favorite 25 Simpsons guest stars.

In The A.V. Club, Erik Adams writes, "Eighteen years later, we can look at 'Who Shot Mr. Burns?, Part One' as a successful experiment in The Simpsons thinking big without losing its core charms. The cliffhanger is irrelevant at this point—the central question now is 'Can the resolution pay off this madcap whodunit?' I don't think so: Like a lot of television mysteries that became zeitgeist-capturing catchphrases—like the one that inspired this first part, or the one that partially inspires the second, 'Who killed Laura Palmer?'—the thrill is in the question mark, not the period. But 'Who Shot Mr. Burns?, Part One' is such an inspired romp that I can't find a reason to fault the show for not being able to follow through on it 100 percent. Can you?
