= The Simpsons 138th Episode Spectacular =

- The Simpsons episode
- Episode no.: Season 7 Episode 10
- Directed by: David Silverman (credited as "Pound Foolish")
- Written by: Jon Vitti (credited as "Penny Wise")
- Production code: 3F31
- Original air date: December 3, 1995

Guest appearances
- Phil Hartman as Troy McClure and Lionel Hutz; Buzz Aldrin as himself; Glenn Close as Mona Simpson; Liz Georges as Maggie Simpson (uncredited)

Episode features
- Chalkboard gag: "I will only do this once a year"
- Couch gag: A montage of a select few previously aired couch gags, culminating into the circus extravaganza couch gag from "Lisa's First Word".
- Commentary: Matt Groening; Bill Oakley; Josh Weinstein; Jon Vitti; George Meyer

Episode chronology
← Previous "Sideshow Bob's Last Gleaming"	Next → "Marge Be Not Proud"
- The Simpsons season 7

"The Simpsons 138th Episode Spectacular" is the tenth episode of the seventh season of the American animated television series The Simpsons. It originally aired on Fox in the United States on December 3, 1995. As the title suggests, it is the 138th episode and the third clip show episode of The Simpsons, after "So It's Come to This: A Simpsons Clip Show" and "Another Simpsons Clip Show".

While the "138th Episode Spectacular" compiles sequences from episodes throughout the entire series like the previous two, it also shows clips from the original Simpsons shorts from The Tracey Ullman Show and other previously unaired material. Like the Halloween specials, the episode is considered non-canon and falls outside of the show's regular continuity.

The "138th Episode Spectacular" was written by Jon Vitti and directed by David Silverman, and is a parody of the common practice among live-action series to produce clip shows.

It has received positive reviews, and was one of the most watched episodes of the seventh season, with a Nielsen rating of 9.5.

== Synopsis ==
Troy McClure hosts the episode, which highlights individual scenes and sequences from throughout the series and offers never-before-seen outtakes. McClure starts the episode by showing a brief presentation of how The Simpsons series was conceived by Matt Groening, James L. Brooks, and Sam Simon, with incorrect renderings of each person (such as portraying Groening as a one-eyed NRA supporter who shoots at the camera upon being revealed). He goes on to present some clips of the original shorts that aired on The Tracey Ullman Show. McClure then responds to questions from fictional fan mail by showing clips that contain the answers. At times, he deliberately does not answer the fan question, asks misleading questions to the audience, or provides trivia that is untrue.

Throughout the episode, McClure presents deleted scenes from several episodes and reveals that alternate endings to part two of "Who Shot Mr. Burns?" were created to prevent the staff on The Simpsons from spoiling the mystery. Troy McClure ends the episode by showing a montage of The Simpsons characters naked, set to the KC and the Sunshine Band song "(Shake, Shake, Shake) Shake Your Booty".

== Production ==
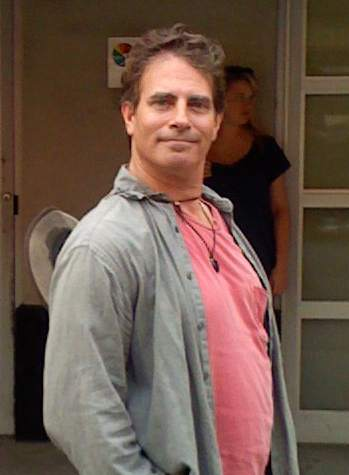
The episode was directed by David Silverman, who used the pseudonym "Pound Foolish".

As the title suggests, "The Simpsons 138th Episode Spectacular" is the 138th episode of The Simpsons, although it is the 155th episode when placed in production order. It is the third The Simpsons clip show, after "So It's Come to This: A Simpsons Clip Show" and "Another Simpsons Clip Show". It was written by Jon Vitti, who used the pseudonym "Penny Wise" in the closing credits because he did not want to be credited for writing a clip show. The episode was directed by David Silverman, who also did not want to be credited, and used the pseudonym "Pound Foolish" in the closing credits.

During the early years of the show, Fox network officials forced the staff of The Simpsons to produce clip shows in order to save money. Originally, the producers were ordered to produce four clip shows per season in order to meet episode limits imposed by the network. Fox network officials reasoned that clip shows could be produced at half the cost of a normal episode, but syndication rights could be sold at full price. The staff, however, felt such a large number of clip shows would alienate fans of the series.

Former showrunner Bill Oakley thought the episode was one of the better clip shows of The Simpsons, because it had more original and interesting material than the others. Oakley enjoyed showing deleted scenes from previous episodes and the Simpsons shorts, and particularly enjoyed the montage of couch gags at the beginning of the episode. The staff tried to entertain themselves while producing the clip show, and Oakley said by having the only actor be Phil Hartman as Troy McClure, it was "guaranteed to be fun". Hartman's lines in this episode were recorded during the sessions for "A Fish Called Selma", which also aired during Season 7.

A lot of the humor in the episode comes from the show's staff mocking themselves and their own work. Troy McClure is shown put off after watching "Good Night", the very first short produced for The Simpsons, and falls asleep while deleted scenes from various episodes are being played. At one point, supposed early designs of Grampa Simpson and Krusty the Clown are shown, which were a "satirical jab at the primitiveness of the [actual] early drawings". Animator David Silverman got defensive over the joke, explaining that the crude drawings were due to a lack of time for proper animation during that era. The fan mail segment showed letters supposedly sent in by distinguished professors and diplomats; Oakley said the joke was that no one of their pedigrees would actually watch the series, let alone write to the staff.

The show's producers are also depicted as animated characters in this episode. Creator Matt Groening is shown as a "radical right-wing" conservative and active gun user who supports the National Rifle Association, which is a deliberate subversion of the political stance most of the staff actually have. Despite having already left the show by the time this episode was made, a portrait of former producer Sam Simon was drawn by Simon himself after he did not like the original joke for him, which was a "No Photo Available" disclaimer.

Smithers dreams about Mr. Burns in "Marge Gets a Job". The censors had issues with the "lump in his bed", which was his knee.

One of the clips shown in the episode comes from the season four episode "Marge Gets a Job", in which Smithers has a dream that he is sleeping and Mr. Burns flies through a window into his room. The sequence shows Burns flying towards a happy-looking Smithers. The original clip went on for a few seconds longer, but had to be trimmed down in order to remove portions that showed "Mr. Burns land[ing] in a particular position on Smithers' anatomy". There were also issues with "the lump in his bed", which the animators said they had drawn as his knee, but the censors had mistakenly believed was an erection.

A deleted scene from the season five episode "Burns' Heir" is also shown, in which a robotic Richard Simmons dances outside Burns's mansion to the 1976 song "(Shake, Shake, Shake) Shake Your Booty". It was cut from "Burns' Heir" because the writers did not think it was funny, nor did it do well with a test audience, although Oakley thought the animation was terrific. To the production staff's surprise, the scene would make the audience "erupt with laughter" when screened at animation conventions and college presentations, so they decided to insert it in this episode.

The montage of nude scenes over the ending credits includes the original animation of Homer and Marge snuggling from "Grampa vs. Sexual Inadequacy", which was reanimated in that episode after Fox censors thought it was too explicit.

Due to the amount of interest in the ending of the "Who Shot Mr. Burns?" episode, David Mirkin wrote several "terrible endings" and recorded several alternate endings with Harry Shearer serving as the only voice actor. Mirkin's original intention was to fool the production staff and also leak the endings to various media outlets; much to his surprise, Mirkin failed to successfully fool the staff. Several endings were animated that showed various characters, such as Barney, Moe, and Apu, shooting Mr. Burns, and were presented as part of this episode.

This is the second episode of the series to utilize digital ink and paint, after "Radioactive Man" earlier in the season. The technique is employed for the Troy McClure segments.

The series wouldn't experiment with digital animation again until season 12's "Tennis the Menace", before switching to digital animation in season 14 ("Treehouse of Horror XIII" as a test run, and then permanently switching with "The Great Louse Detective").

=== Referenced clips ===
During the opening credits the episode is advertised as having "twenty-three percent new footage", while the rest are clips taken from previous episodes. The five shorts used in this episode are "Good Night" and "Bathtime", which were featured in their entirety, and portions of "The Perfect Crime", "Space Patrol", and "World War III". Some parts of the episode contain montages of only a few seconds-long clips, such as those referring to Homer's increased stupidity ("Blood Feud", "Flaming Moe's", "Marge vs. the Monorail", "Deep Space Homer", and "Treehouse of Horror V"), or those suggesting Smithers' homosexuality ("Rosebud", "Dog of Death", "Lisa vs. Malibu Stacy", and "Marge Gets a Job").

Episode name (in order of appearance)	Season	Clip description
"Good Night"	shorts	Homer and Marge tuck the kids into bed.
"The Perfect Crime"	shorts	Maggie reveals the thief of Marge's cookies, Bart.
"Space Patrol"	shorts	Bart, Lisa, and Maggie play Space Patrol.
"World War III"	shorts	Saying that it is World War III, Homer tests how long it takes his family to get into the bomb shelter.
"Bathtime"	shorts	Homer tries to force Bart to take a bath.
Montage sequence	2–6	Homer gets more and more stupid each season.
Montage sequence	3–5	Waylon Smithers fantasizes about Mr. Burns.
Montage sequence	4, 5 & 7	Various deleted scenes from previous episodes.
"Who Shot Mr. Burns? (Part II)"	7	Unaired alternate ending in which Waylon Smithers is revealed to have shot Mr. Burns.
Montage sequence	1–6	"Hardcore nudity" in The Simpsons.

== Cultural references ==
The entire setup of Troy McClure presenting the episode is a parody of the practice by live-action series to produce clip shows in general, by celebrating a completely arbitrary milestone and by making exaggerated use of the conventions of traditional highlights shows, such as a grand introduction and relentlessly showbizzy host.

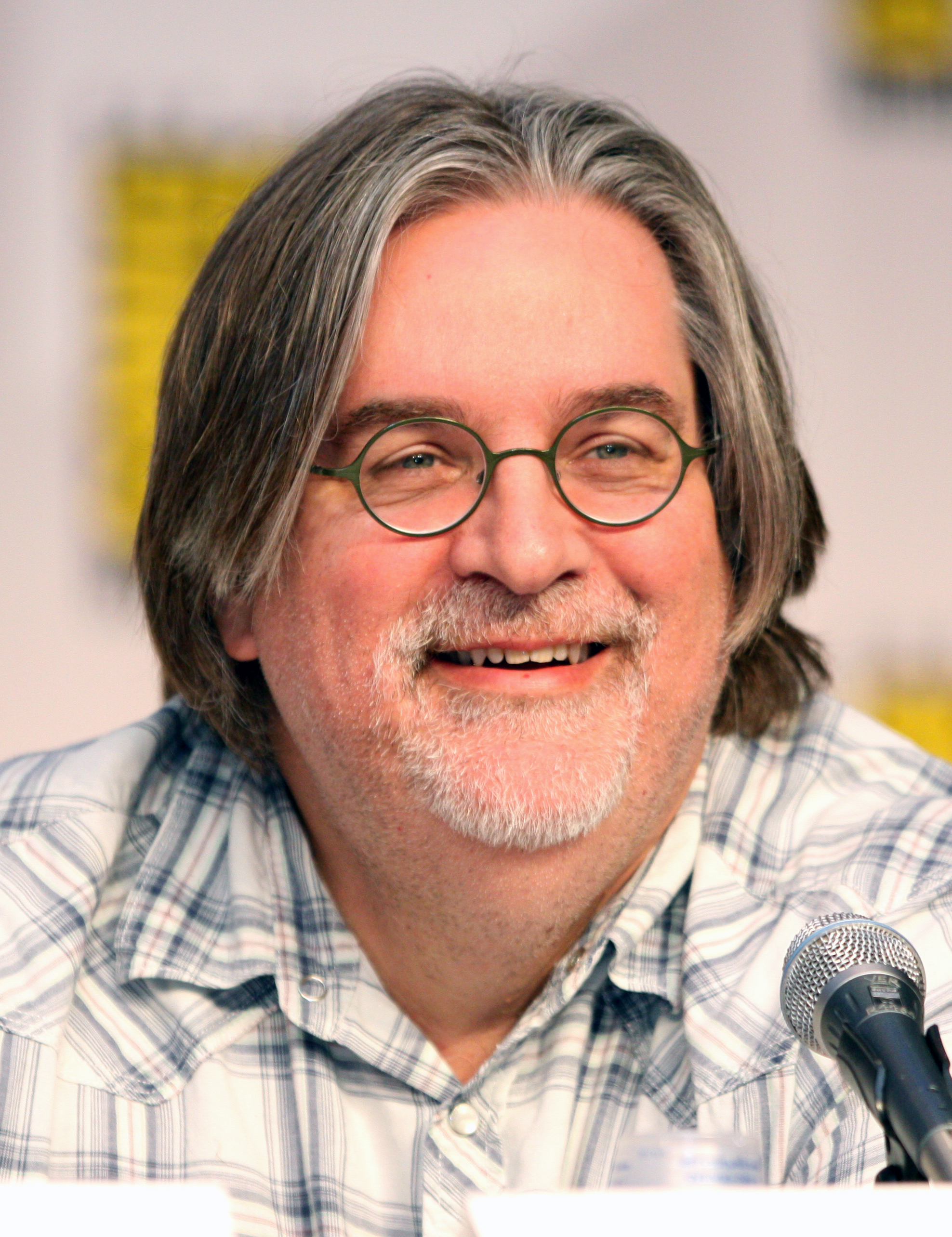
The Simpsons creator Matt Groening is portrayed as a bald Southern conservative.

The episode makes references to several films and television shows. The Tracey Ullman Show is referred to as "the nation's showcase for psychiatrist jokes and musical comedy numbers", while the outtakes right before the commercial breaks parodies television series such as Roseanne and Home Improvement (which regularly aired similar outtakes). The deleted scene from "$pringfield (or, How I Learned to Stop Worrying and Love Legalized Gambling)" in which Homer plays blackjack with James Bond parodies the 1967 film Casino Royale. The deleted scene from "Burns' Heir" in which the robotic Richard Simmons is shot through the head and repairs itself parodies the liquid metal T-1000 in the 1991 film Terminator 2: Judgment Day. The episode satirizes the Fox network in particular, as the two specials mentioned in the beginning, Alien Nose Job and Five Fabulous Weeks Of 'The Chevy Chase Show', are references to two actual programs that have aired on the network: The Chevy Chase Show (1993) and Alien Autopsy: Fact or Fiction (1995). Several famous musical themes are used or parodied in the clips, such as when Homer sings the theme song from The Flintstones, and Johann Strauss II's Blue Danube is heard in the background of one scene. The show's producers are depicted as animated characters in the introduction: Groening is a bald Southern patriot who wields a gun wearing an eye patch, a reference to the promotional poster of the 1970 film Patton, and his own comic strip Life in Hell; Brooks is seen as Rich Uncle Pennybags, the tycoon from Monopoly; and Simon's appearance resembles Howard Hughes. One of Smithers' fantasies is a parody of Marilyn Monroe's famous happy birthday song to President John F. Kennedy, while another one is an allusion to Peter Pan flying through the window. The book that Krusty tries to sell is a reference to Madonna's book entitled Sex. "NRA4EVER", the message that appears on a cash register during the opening sequence reference in a trivia question, is a reference to the National Rifle Association.

== Reception ==
The episode ranked among the ten most heavily viewed episodes of the seventh season. After its initial airing, the episode received a Nielsen rating of 9.5, and a Nielsen rank of 48.

The episode has become study material for sociology courses at University of California, Berkeley, where it is used to "examine issues of the production and reception of cultural objects, in this case, a satirical cartoon show", and to figure out what it is "trying to tell audiences about aspects primarily of American society, and, to a lesser extent, about other societies". Some questions asked in the courses include: "What aspects of American society are being addressed in the episode? What aspects of them are used to make the points? How is the satire conveyed: through language? Drawing? Music? Is the behavior of each character consistent with his/her character as developed over the years? Can we identify elements of the historical/political context that the writers are satirizing? What is the difference between satire and parody?" Considered a spoof of television clip shows, the episode is seen drawing attention to prevailing televisual conventions and reminds viewers that The Simpsons itself participates actively in that same cultural legacy.

The authors of the book I Can't Believe It's a Bigger and Better Updated Unofficial Simpsons Guide, Gary Russell and Gareth Roberts, thought that "the out-takes [were] up to standard" and said that the episode contains "a number of great self-referential moments".

Simone Knox praised its visual style in her article Reading the Ungraspable Double-Codedness of "The Simpsons". Knox referred to it as not simply a clip show, but a clip show "that looks at the series with a sense of hyper-self-consciousness about its own textuality".

The episode itself has been described by some critics as a kind of self-imposed benchmark of the show itself, with writer Bill Keveney commenting, "the show picks its own benchmarks, as it did in 1995".

DVD Movie Guide's Colin Jacobson said even though the episode is a clip show, it "gussies up the concept with some interesting elements, and keeps repetitive material to a minimum. Instead, it offers much then-unseen footage as well as old snippets from The Tracey Ullman Show. It still feels like a cheap way to crank out a new episode, but it's one of the better clip shows you'll see."

Jennifer Malkowski of DVD Verdict gave the episode a B+ grade and commented, "apart from the creative material, what really makes this [episode] shine is the hilarious hosting by Troy McClure."

Dave Foster of DVD Times criticized the episode: "Despite some interesting concepts such as a bored Troy McClure presenting to much amusement and the presence of deleted scenes and Tracey Ullman shorts amongst the clips, this is an episode that tries hard to find a hook but never quite manages, assuring it'll never make it into regular rotation on this viewer's watch."
