= Marge Gets a Job =

- The Simpsons episode
- Episode no.: Season 4 Episode 7
- Directed by: Jeff Lynch
- Written by: Bill Oakley & Josh Weinstein
- Production code: 9F05
- Original air date: November 5, 1992

Guest appearances
- Tom Jones as himself; Phil Hartman as Troy McClure and Lionel Hutz

Episode features
- Chalkboard gag: "I will not teach others to fly"
- Couch gag: The family members' heads are on the wrong bodies and they switch to the right heads with Maggie taking the pacifier from Homer's mouth.
- Commentary: Matt Groening; Al Jean; Bill Oakley; Josh Weinstein; Jeffrey Lynch; Jim Reardon

Episode chronology
← Previous "Itchy & Scratchy: The Movie"	Next → "New Kid on the Block"
- The Simpsons season 4

"Marge Gets a Job" is the seventh episode of the fourth season of the American animated television series The Simpsons. It originally aired on Fox in the United States on November 5, 1992. In this episode, Marge gets a job at the Springfield Nuclear Power Plant to pay for foundation repair at the Simpsons house. Mr. Burns develops a crush on Marge after seeing her at work and unwittingly harasses her. A subplot with Bart parallels the fable "The Boy Who Cried Wolf".

The episode was the first written by Bill Oakley and Josh Weinstein and directed by Jeffrey Lynch.

== Plot ==
The Simpson family's house needs its foundation repaired, but the family does not have enough money to afford the repairs. When a job opens at Springfield Nuclear Power Plant, after Mr. Burns forced an employee who worked at the plant for 45 years into retirement, Marge decides to apply for the job opening so she and Homer can collectively earn enough money to pay for the foundation repair. After Lisa helps Marge write a resumé, Marge is hired. Mr. Burns becomes infatuated with Marge.

Meanwhile, Bart, after making several excuses to avoid taking a test, is forced to take the test by his teacher, Edna Krabappel. She places him alone outside the classroom, hands him the test, and leaves. A captive wolf escapes from a taping of The Krusty the Clown Show and attacks Bart outside the classroom. He cries "Wolf!" but Edna, who advised him to read "The Boy Who Cried Wolf", ignores him. Groundskeeper Willie rescues Bart by fighting the wolf, giving Bart time to return to his classroom. Since he feels that he will not be believed if he tells the truth, Bart says, with apparent honesty, that he made up the story. He then passes out and Edna realizes that Bart really was attacked.

In an effort to impress Marge, Mr. Burns gives her a promotion, before coming onto her. When she tells him that she is married, he fires her from her position. She threatens to sue Mr. Burns for wrongful firing and enlists the help of Lionel Hutz. While Hutz has a strong case, he flees in terror after discovering Mr. Burns has ten high-priced lawyers. Homer stands up to Mr. Burns and admonishes him for sexually harassing Marge. Mr. Burns is impressed by Homer's devotion to Marge and decides to arrange a private concert for them featuring Tom Jones, who had previously been taken captive by Burns after Marge told him she was a fan of Jones's music.

== Production ==
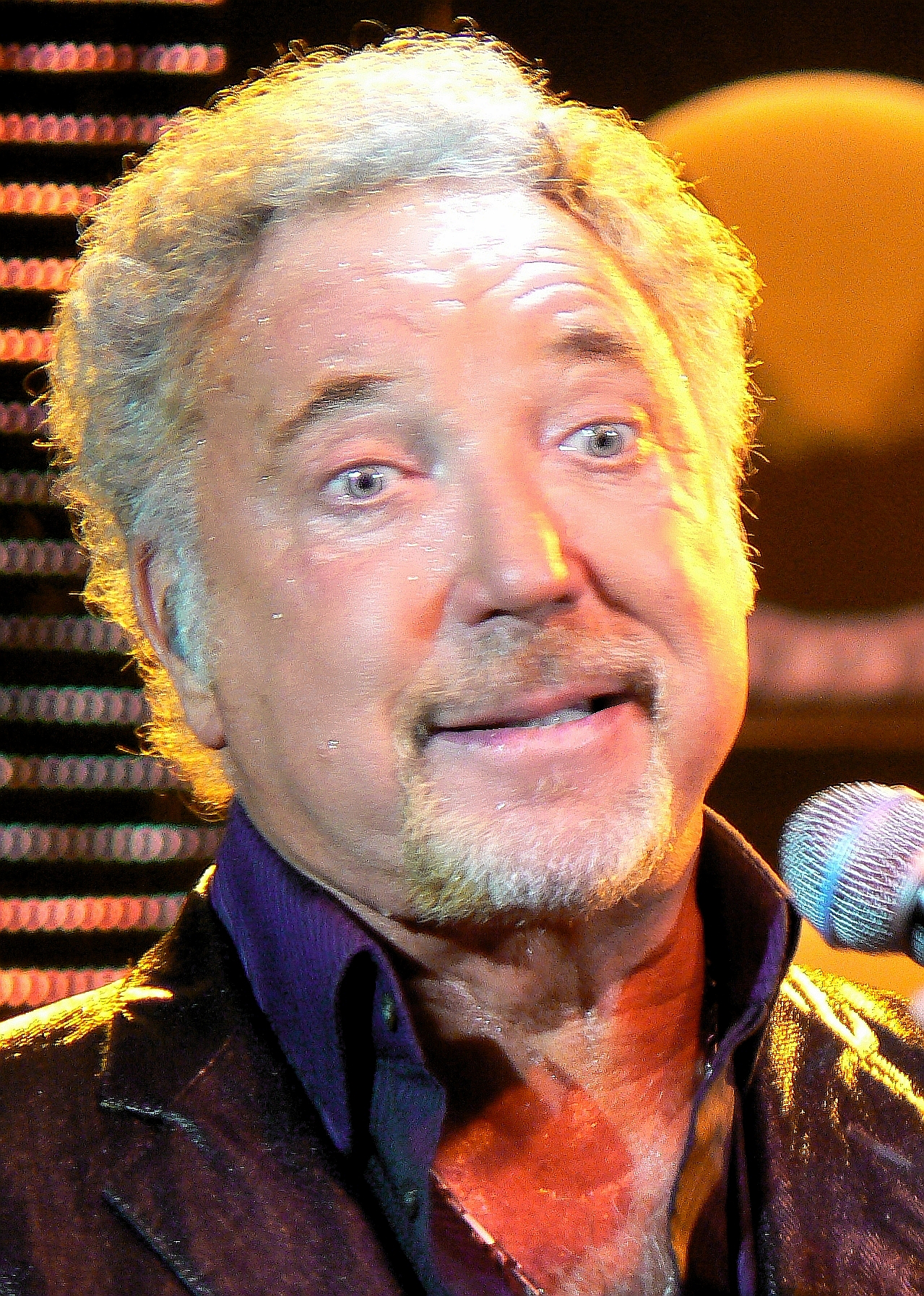
Singer Tom Jones guest stars and Marge is revealed as a huge fan.

The idea for the show came from Conan O'Brien, who thought of Marge getting a job at the power plant and that Mr. Burns has a crush on her. The animators had trouble animating Marge with the suit and lipstick. Director Jeff Lynch said there were a few scenes where Marge "looks like a monster". All the jargon used by Troy McClure was taken from a Time–Life foundation repair book and used accurately. The original subplot for the episode was Mr. Burns telling Homer to dress up as Mister Atom and have him go to schools to talk to the children. The cast liked Tom Jones as a guest star, finding him genial and fun to work with. He offered to perform a concert after he was done recording lines.

The animators had originally drawn three different versions of Bart after he was attacked by the wolf. They picked the version that looked the least scary, as they did not want Bart to look too "beaten up". An animation error during Mr. Smithers' dream sequence about Mr. Burns also caused issues when dealing with network censors, mistaking a "lump in his bed" as an erection, which was supposed to be Mr. Smithers' knee.

== Cultural references ==
The restaurant "The Spruce Caboose" is a reference to Howard Hughes's plane The Spruce Goose. Homer's fantasy of life in the woods is a parody of Henry David Thoreau's Walden. Grandpa Simpson asks Bart if he has read "The Boy Who Cried Wolf", and he replies "I glanced at it. Boy cries wolf. Has a few laughs. I forget how it ends." Mr. Burns asks Smithers if he can dig up Al Jolson. The song performed for Mr. Burns at the retirement party is based on the song and dance number in Citizen Kane (1941). The photo of Mr. Burns meeting Elvis Presley is modeled on the photo of Richard Nixon meeting Elvis. While Mr. Burns is looking through the surveillance cameras, "The Imperial March" from the Star Wars films is played in the background.

== Reception ==
=== Critical reception ===
Gary Russell and Gareth Roberts, the authors of the book I Can't Believe It's a Bigger and Better Updated Unofficial Simpsons Guide commented, "We like Bart's fantasy of the radioactive Marie and Pierre Curie, and Smithers' fantasy of his loved one flying through the window. A collection of wonderful set pieces rather than a story, which fizzles out without any real attempt at an ending."

Empire placed the "Mister Burns" dance number as the show's fourth best film parody, "the pick of a big bunch" from the show's many Citizen Kane parodies, coming "replete with Wellesian camera angles and subtly altered lyrics".

Nathan Rabin writes that "'Marge Gets a Job' is just about perfect. There is not a wasted sequence or unfunny gag. It's head-spinningly smart in a way that doesn't call attention to itself—like setting the retirement party at The Spruce Caboose, a giant, unwieldy, trainwreck-themed eatery whose name and conceit are brilliant parodies of Howard Hughes' giant wooden airplane, the Spruce Goose. In its golden prime, The Simpsons did things no one else would and did them better than anyone else possibly could. In the process, it created a legacy that is still unmatched two decades on."

=== Ratings ===
In its original broadcast, "Marge Gets a Job" finished 25th in ratings for the week of November 2–8, 1992, with a Nielsen rating of 13.6, equivalent to approximately 12.7 million viewing households. It was the highest-rated show on the Fox network that week, beating Beverly Hills, 90210 and The Simpsons episode "Itchy & Scratchy: The Movie", which aired on Tuesday in the same week.

== Alternate version ==
In the original airing of this episode, Mrs. Krabappel names several different diseases Bart has faked in order to get out of taking his English test, one of which is Tourette's syndrome. After Bart claims that he is not over it, he begins barking and snarling and mutters, "Shove it, witch!" This scene garnered many complaints from people who thought it was tasteless of the writers to make fun of an actual condition and Joshua Smith, a boy in Renton, Washington began seeking legal action. Smith demanded that they "not repeat the episode and have Bart Simpson befriend somebody with Tourette's on the show" and include an apology from Bart at the end. Executive producer Mike Reiss replied with an apology saying "We kind of feel like we made a mistake this time. We felt bad about this." In a move that was unprecedented for the show, the producers agreed to remove the scene from future broadcasts. However, Smith's other requests went unfulfilled. In the version of the episode released on the season four DVD boxset, the part with Bart demonstrating his supposed Tourette's syndrome to Mrs. Krabappel was kept intact, but Krabappel's line about Bart having "...that unfortunate bout of Tourette's syndrome" was replaced with "...that unfortunate bout of rabies."

Additionally, during Smithers' dream sequence with Mr. Burns, censors demanded the cutting of several seconds of animation that showed "Mr. Burns land[ing] in a particular position on Smithers anatomy".

Following the 2011 Tōhoku earthquake and tsunami and the associated nuclear emergency, the episode was pulled from an Austrian network due to jokes about radiation poisoning.
