= The Simpsons shorts =

Special episode list for an animated series

The Simpson family as they appeared in the early shorts from The Tracey Ullman Show. Their design gradually evolved towards those seen in the standalone show.

The Simpsons shorts are a series of 48 animated short films that aired as a recurring segment on the Fox sketch comedy variety television series The Tracey Ullman Show for three seasons, before the characters spun off into The Simpsons, their own half-hour prime-time show. They feature Homer, Marge, Bart, Lisa, and Maggie, and a few secondary characters. The series was created by Matt Groening, who designed the Simpson family and wrote many of the shorts. The shorts first aired on April 19, 1987, starting with "Good Night". The final short to air was "TV Simpsons", originally airing on May 14, 1989. The Simpsons later debuted on December 17, 1989, as an independent series with the Christmas special "Simpsons Roasting on an Open Fire".

One marketing study found that only 14 percent of Americans were familiar with the shorts, compared to 85 percent in November 1990 who were familiar with the Simpsons family, 11 months after the full-length show began airing.

A handful of these shorts were released theatrically in theaters, and only a few of these have been released on DVD. "Good Night" was included on The Simpsons Season 1 DVD. Five of these shorts were later used in the clip-show episode "The Simpsons 138th Episode Spectacular" on the half-hour show, which was released on the Season 7 DVD. These five shorts were "Good Night", which was featured in its entirety, and portions of "The Perfect Crime", "Space Patrol", "World War III", and "Bathtime". In "You Kent Always Say What You Want", the short "Family Portrait" replaces the entire opening sequence in celebration of the 400th episode. ("Family Portrait" was previously released as a pre-feature short on the 1989 CBS-Fox VHS release of the film Working Girl.) In June 2013, it was reported that FXX was trying to acquire the shorts for their Simpsons app, "Simpsons World".

The version of the Simpson family from the shorts was depicted as ghosts haunting the Simpsons house in the season twenty six episode "Treehouse of Horror XXV".

== Development ==
When producer James L. Brooks was working on the television variety show The Tracey Ullman Show, he decided that he wanted to include short animated wraparounds before and after the commercial breaks. Having seen one of cartoonist Matt Groening's Life in Hell comic strips, Brooks asked Groening to pitch an idea for a series of animated shorts, which Groening initially intended to present as his Life in Hell series. Groening later realized that animating Life in Hell would require the rescinding of publication rights for his life's work. He therefore chose another approach while waiting in the lobby of Brooks's office for the pitch meeting, hurriedly formulating his version of a dysfunctional family that became the Simpsons. He named the characters after his own family members, substituting "Bart" for his own name. Bart was modeled after Groening's older brother, Mark, but given a different name which was chosen as an anagram of "brat". The stories were written and storyboarded by Matt Groening. The family was extremely crudely drawn, because Groening had submitted basic sketches to the animators, assuming they would clean them up; instead, they just traced over his drawings. This is most evident in Season One (1987), where the characters appear much different than their FOX counterparts; by Season Three (1989), the characters grew to be more neatly drawn and complex. The animation was produced domestically at Klasky-Csupo, with Wesley Archer, David Silverman, and Bill Kopp being animators for the first season. After season one, it would be animated by Archer and Silverman thereafter. Gyorgyi Peluce was the colorist and the person who decided to make the characters yellow.

The actors who voiced the characters in the short later reprised their roles in The Simpsons series. Dan Castellaneta performed the voices of Homer Simpson, Grampa Simpson, and Krusty the Clown. Homer's voice sounds significantly different and more grouchy in the shorts compared to most episodes of the half-hour show, as Castellaneta originally tried to impersonate Walter Matthau. Although he would retain this characteristic through the early episodes of the regular series, it was gradually dropped as Homer's personality evolved away from that of a stereotypical bitter sitcom father. The producers of the show were in need of someone to do voiceovers, so rather than hire actors, they asked Castellaneta (who had already done some voice work) and Julie Kavner, both members of the Ullman Show cast, to do it. The kids still needed voices, and Nancy Cartwright, a journeyman voice actress, came in to audition. She recalled that "I was already doing voicework for eight different shows at the time and thought this would just be another job. They originally wanted me for Lisa's voice, but I thought, 'Nah, I don't want to be the boring middle child, I want to be a bratty 10-year old boy.' So as soon as I gave a demonstration, [Brooks and Groening] hired me on the spot." Some time later, Yeardley Smith, a 22-year-old B-movie actress whose most notable accomplishment to date was featuring in the notorious 1986 Stephen King film Maximum Overdrive, was brought in to do Lisa's voice. The recording of the shorts was often primitive; according to Cartwright, the dialogue for the Ullman shorts was recorded on a portable tape deck in a makeshift studio, which consisted of the video engineer suite, above the bleachers on the Ullman show set.

The shorts were featured on the first three seasons of The Tracey Ullman Show. During the abbreviated (13-episode) first season, Simpsons shorts were seen irregularly, with several first season episodes instead featuring a completely different series of cartoon shorts called Dr. N!Godatu. However, the shorts quickly became the most popular segments on the show, leading to The Simpsons being featured in every episode of the second and third season. By the fourth and last season of The Tracey Ullman Show, the first season of the half-hour Simpsons show was on the air. In the two first seasons the shorts were divided into three or four parts, but in the third season they were played as a single story. After the spinoff's premiere, Tracey Ullman later filed a lawsuit, claiming that her show was the source of The Simpsons' success and therefore should receive a share of the show's profit. Eventually the courts ruled in favor of the network.

== Shorts ==
=== Season 1 (1987) ===
No.	Title	The Tracey Ullman Show episode	Original release date
1	"Good Night"	Season 1, Episode 3	April 19, 1987
Homer says goodnight to Bart, making him ponder the nature of the mind. Marge says goodnight to Lisa, giving her a fear of bedbugs. Marge then sings "Rock-a-bye Baby" to Maggie, giving her a nightmare about it. All three of the kids end up crowding Homer and Marge's bed. This short was featured on a later Simpsons episode "The Simpsons 138th Episode Spectacular". Maggie's scene of this short was also featured at the beginning of "Looking for Mr. Goodbart".
2	"Watching Television"	Season 1, Episode 5	May 3, 1987
Lisa and Bart constantly fight while watching TV. They eventually find something they agree on: stopping Maggie from changing the channel. The entire family eventually end up watching TV together on the couch.
3	"Bart Jumps"	Season 1, Episode 6	May 10, 1987
Homer has Bart attempt to jump off a table and into his arms. Each time Bart jumps, Homer is distracted and fails to catch him.
4	"Babysitting Maggie"	Season 1, Episode 8	May 31, 1987
Marge puts Lisa and Bart in charge of babysitting Maggie; however, they end up ignoring her.
5	"The Pacifier"	Season 1, Episode 10	June 21, 1987
Lisa and Bart take Maggie's pacifier away to stop her from sucking on it, but Maggie refuses to kick the habit. Bart and Lisa eventually learn if they cannot get Maggie to quit sucking on pacifiers, it is better to join in.
6	"Burp Contest"	Season 1, Episode 11	June 28, 1987
Lisa and Bart compete in a contest, while Maggie watches, to see who can make the most disgusting burp. Marge objects several times, but to no avail. Homer doesn't help either and merely joins in.
7	"Eating Dinner"	Season 1, Episode 12	July 12, 1987
Marge makes dinner and the family sits down for the meal. She insists that everyone should have table manners, but the family's crude eating habits are hard to stop.

=== Season 2 (1987–88) ===
No.	Title	The Tracey Ullman Show episode	Original release date
8	"Making Faces"	Season 2, Episode 1	September 20, 1987
Marge warns Bart, Lisa, and Maggie that if they make scary faces, their faces will freeze in place forever. The kids ignore her until Marge gives them a scare with a mirror, pretending that their faces have actually frozen.
9	"The Funeral"	Season 2, Episode 2	October 4, 1987
The family attends the funeral of Uncle Hubert. Bart proves to be disruptive and Homer swears to never take the kids to another funeral, much to their dismay. This is the first segment to feature characters not part of the Simpson family and the only one to feature Uncle Hubert, who has never appeared in the show or in the shorts since.
10	"Maggie's Brain"	Season 2, Episode 3	October 11, 1987
Bart and Lisa wonder what is inside Maggie's mind when looking at her in her crib. Her imagination is her as a giant, and she is tickling baby-sized versions of Bart and Lisa.
11	"Football"	Season 2, Episode 4	October 18, 1987
Homer promises the kids chocolate milkshakes if Bart can catch one of his long football passes. However, there are many obstacles to overcome, like falling down a cliff, but Bart finally manages to catch the football, albeit with his mouth. To celebrate, Homer keeps his word, and they get their treat, but Bart is unable to eat it because of the football still being lodged in his mouth. When Homer threatens to take it away, Lisa helps Bart consume it.
12	"House of Cards"	Season 2, Episode 5	October 25, 1987
Bart tries to make a house of cards, but Lisa and Maggie make noises that cause the house to fall every time.
13	"Bart and Dad Eat Dinner"	Season 2, Episode 6	November 1, 1987
Marge takes the girls out to watch a ballet, leaving Homer in charge of dinner. Bart cannot stomach it when he is forced to eat a mix of fish nuggets and pork-a-roni.
14	"Space Patrol"	Season 2, Episode 7	November 8, 1987
Bart, Lisa and Maggie play a game of "Space Patrol" while Homer and Marge are out. Lisa plays a superhero with Maggie as her sidekick, while Bart puts a jug on his head with the pretense of it being the helmet of an alien warlord. However, his head gets stuck in the jug and Lisa "frees" Bart using a croquet mallet. Clips from this short were featured on a later Simpsons episode "The Simpsons 138th Episode Spectacular".
15	"Bart's Haircut"	Season 2, Episode 8	November 15, 1987
When Bart's hair grows too long, Homer and Marge demand him to get it cut. The barber ends up shaving Bart's entire hair, and he attempts to disguise his scalp using glue, his old hair, and eventually a paper bag, but all fail. Eventually, Bart is ordered by Homer to come downstairs. The family promises not to laugh if he shows them the haircut, but fail to keep their vow when they see how Bart looks.
16	"World War III"	Season 2, Episode 9	November 22, 1987
Homer wakes up the family in the middle of the night claiming that World War III has started to test their readiness for a nuclear war. The terrified family manages to escape to a fallout shelter in the basement in 18 seconds, but Homer says that this is too slow. After two more drills, the increasingly exhausted family members trick Homer into racing into the bunker alone and lock him inside. Bart asks Marge if this is a good thing to do; she ignores the question and says they'll let him out in sunrise. Clips from this short were featured on a later Simpsons episode "The Simpsons 138th Episode Spectacular".
17	"The Perfect Crime"	Season 2, Episode 10	December 12, 1987
When Marge makes a batch of chocolate chip cookies, Bart becomes obsessed with pulling off "the perfect crime" and stealing them all. His various attempts are foiled by the heat of the cookies and Maggie, but eventually, all of the treats vanish from the tray. Maggie takes Homer and Marge along a trail of cookie crumbs that leads to Bart's bedroom, where he is lying with a bloated abdomen and complaining that the "perfect crime" is impossible. Clips from this short were featured on a later Simpsons episode "The Simpsons 138th Episode Spectacular".
18	"Scary Stories"	Season 2, Episode 11	December 19, 1987
Bart tells Lisa and Maggie a series of stories in the dark, only to believe they're coming true. All three children scream as Homer and Marge enter, to their confusion.
19	"Grandpa and the Kids"	Season 2, Episode 12	January 10, 1988
Grampa tells the kids stories from his heyday. When the kids stop listening to him, he feigns his death to recapture their attention.: First appearance of Grampa Simpson.
20	"Gone Fishin'"	Season 2, Episode 13	January 24, 1988
Bart and Homer go on a fishing trip. Homer asks Bart for a baloney sandwich, but Bart forgot the baloney. He puts the bait on the sandwich instead. When they get the boat in the water, they hit rapids and later fall down a waterfall.
21	"Skateboarding"	Season 2, Episode 14	February 7, 1988
Bart teaches his sisters how to skateboard, but is outdone every time he tries to show off.
22	"The Pagans"	Season 2, Episode 15	February 14, 1988
When the family is on their way to church, the kids declares themselves pagans. After the car breaks down, the kids start acting like pagans, much to Homer's anger. After the children take off their outfits and wear leaves, Homer, in a fit of blind rage, chases them inside a church, where they are hidden from his sight.
23	"The Closet"	Season 2, Episode 16	February 21, 1988
When Bart hears Homer calling him, he fears that his father will make him do chores. He hides in a closet, only to accidentally lock himself in. After a failed attempt to get Maggie to help him, Bart breaks down the door and decides to do his chores, only to discover a note explaining that the whole family has left to get chocolate milkshakes.
24	"The Aquarium"	Season 2, Episode 17	February 28, 1988
Homer takes Bart, Lisa and Maggie to the aquarium. Bart finds a way to get into the shark tank and swims with a shark. When Homer finds out, he is angry, prompting Bart to stay in the tank since he feels it's safer than dealing with him. Two parts of this short were featured at the beginning of a later Simpsons episode, "Lisa Gets the Blues".
25	"Family Portrait"	Season 2, Episode 18	March 6, 1988
Homer has trouble taking a normal family portrait. Every time they are close to a good picture, the family sabotages the shot. This short replaced the opening sequence in a later Simpsons episode "You Kent Always Say What You Want".: First appearance of the running gag in which Homer clutches Bart, saying "Why you little..."
26	"Bart's Hiccups"	Season 2, Episode 19	March 13, 1988
Lisa and Maggie try to cure Bart's hiccups using some rather unorthodox methods.
27	"The Money Jar"	Season 2, Episode 20	March 20, 1988
Marge warns the kids that they shouldn't steal from the money jar. Lisa and Maggie's consciences appear to prevent them from taking the jar's contents, but Bart's conscience encourages him to help himself to the cash. However, the money jar only contains a dollar, prompting Bart to remark "You can't even trust your own mother."
28	"The Art Museum"	Season 2, Episode 21	May 3, 1988
The Simpsons go to an art museum. Bart stares at a nude painting and Lisa plays with an ancient vase. Marge realizes that the kids are too young to appreciate fine arts. However, Bart decides to become a collector by stealing an art piece. This action embarrasses Homer and almost results in him crashing the car.: First time Bart says "¡Ay, caramba!" and "Don't have a cow, man."
29	"Zoo Story"	Season 2, Episode 22	May 10, 1988
Homer takes Marge and the kids on an outing to the zoo. While there, he points out how stupid a family of chimpanzees look and fails to realize that the chimps look identical to his own brood. Homer then teases the monkeys by tricking them with peanuts, only to have them throw feces in his face. On the ride home, as Homer angrily begins to complain about the chimpanzees, he is suddenly hit by something. The family then discovers that Bart has switched places with his chimpanzee lookalike, while he is fed bananas by the others.

=== Season 3 (1988–89) ===
No.	Title	The Tracey Ullman Show episode	Original release date
30	"Shut Up Simpsons"	Season 3, Episode 1	November 6, 1988
Maggie squeaks her toy, which causes a chain reaction of anger in the family; Lisa attacks Maggie for making noise, Bart attacks Lisa for shoving a baby, Homer attacks Bart for hitting a girl, and Grampa attacks Homer for hitting a kid. Bart then encourages the family to make up, only to sabotage his deed by insulting Homer. Lisa and Maggie discover they're more like Marge than Homer, especially when they see Homer, Bart, and Grampa locked in a strangle match with each other.: One of a few Simpsons shorts released theatrically in 1989.
31	"The Shell Game"	Season 3, Episode 2	November 13, 1988
Bart tries to hide one of the cookies he stole from the jar by distracting his parents with the shell game. Although his plan seems to succeed, Maggie has hidden the cookie in her mouth and subsequently eats it.
32	"The Bart Simpson Show"	Season 3, Episode 3	November 20, 1988
The kids are watching TV and Homer tells them to stop watching The Itchy & Scratchy Show because it's "too violent". Unable to watch cartoons, Bart puts on his own show, which eventually angers Homer even more because Bart removed the TV's components to appear on screen. To respond, Homer decides to choke Bart, but this backfires, as Bart proceeds to also choke Homer.: First appearance of Itchy and Scratchy.
33	"Punching Bag"	Season 3, Episode 4	November 27, 1988
Marge and Homer force the kids into their toy room and tell them to "play nice." Bart takes out his anger on a punching bag; Lisa then takes a turn and adds motivation by drawing Homer's face on the bag. Homer, trying to nap, rudely commands Marge to make the kids stop; when the noise suddenly gets louder, he discovers Marge punching the bag. Homer attempts to break and punch the bag, only to be hit in the face and knocked out.: First time Homer says "D'oh!"
34	"Simpson Xmas"	Season 3, Episode 5	December 18, 1988
Bart tells a story of Christmas with the Simpson family in the style of The Night Before Christmas.
35	"The Krusty the Clown Show"	Season 3, Episode 7	January 15, 1989
The kids get to see Krusty the Clown's show live for the first time. Bart believes Krusty is an impostor and exposes it on television, much to his parents' dismay.
36	"Bart the Hero"	Season 3, Episode 8	January 29, 1989
When Bart is sent outside to run by Homer's orders to get into shape, he gets rewarded for unintentionally stopping a burglar from robbing a candy store, to Homer and Lisa's delight, but he wants the reward to be candy bars, much to their dismay.
37	"Bart's Little Fantasy"	Season 3, Episode 9	February 5, 1989
After the kids are ordered to clean their room by Homer and Marge, Bart forces his sisters to do all the work while he tells a story about a parallel world where large kids are the bosses of their small parents, who are made to do chores. However, Bart is caught red-handed by Marge and Homer makes him mow the lawn for his lack of involvement and as punishment. Lisa ends Bart's story with her and Maggie living happily, while Bart watches them from outside in dismay struggling to mow the lawn.
38	"Scary Movie"	Season 3, Episode 10	February 12, 1989
Lisa, Bart, and Maggie go to the movies to see "The Return of the Happy Little Elves", but Bart convinces the girls to see "Revenge of the Space Mutants" instead. However, Bart ends up being scared by it because one of the space mutants looks like himself. As he screams, Lisa and Maggie try to comfort him.
39	"Home Hypnotism"	Season 3, Episode 11	February 19, 1989
When Homer sees Lisa, Bart, and Maggie going crazy and bouncing off the walls, he and Marge try using hypnotism to tame the kids. They pretend to become mindless zombies, and Homer and Marge vow to never hypnotize them again; that is until Bart hits his father in the stomach with a toy ball.
40	"Shoplifting"	Season 3, Episode 12	February 26, 1989
Bart, hungry for chocolate bars, steals some from the supermarket, despite Lisa's "warnings". He is quickly caught by security, but when the guard leaves the room to talk to his boss, he eats the candy and claims the cops have "no proof." However, he is caught red-handed thanks to the guard looking at the mirror and his face covered in chocolate. Marge reprimands him for his behavior on the ride back to the house. However, he is nonchalant and rude, angering Homer, pointing out that his parents are still driving him home, after she tries to tell him about the saying "crime hurts the criminal". Homer, finally losing his temper, forces Bart out of the car and drives away along with Lisa, Marge, and Maggie, leaving him to walk home.
41	"Echo Canyon"	Season 3, Episode 13	March 12, 1989
The family drives to Echo Canyon and take turns making echoes. However, Bart is very disruptive, almost crushing the car with a boulder, and leads Homer to chase after him.
42	"Bathtime"	Season 3, Episode 14	March 19, 1989
Homer makes Bart take his "Sunday Night Bath", but he ends up flooding the bathroom due to the water being too cold and him forgetting to turn the hot water off,to Homer's fury. To respond, Homer chases Bart all over the house. This short was later featured on a later Simpsons episode "The Simpsons 138th Episode Spectacular" in Season Seven.
43	"Bart's Nightmare"	Season 3, Episode 15	March 26, 1989
The family discovers that someone has eaten every last cookie in the cookie jar except one. The culprit turns out to be Bart, who regrets gorging on the snack, especially when he has a nightmare in which he is only an inch tall and nearly crushed by giant cookies in the kitchen. Lisa awakens Bart, who is relieved that his experience was only a dream, but he is scared of Homer offering one to him.
44	"Bart of the Jungle"	Season 3, Episode 17	April 16, 1989
The kids swing from the trees using Homer's neckties, and Homer, who is angered by this, ends up being caught in their trap. They refuse to let him go, and he is heard screaming at night as they watch TV.
45	"Family Therapy"	Season 3, Episode 18	April 23, 1989
Homer takes the family to a psychologist because he claims they cannot laugh anymore. The psychologist tries to remain calm, but the disruptions caused by the Simpsons eventually drive him over the edge, and he kicks them out of his office. This turns out to be the cure the family needed, and they laugh all the way home.: This episode is an early demo of the Season 1 episode "There's No Disgrace Like Home".
46	"Maggie In Peril: Chapter One"	Season 3, Episode 19	April 30, 1989
After Maggie accidentally kicks her ball on Bart's face, he angrily kicks it out of sight and she takes off to retrieve it. She ends up being caught on a branch and the story is to be continued.
47	"Maggie In Peril: The Thrilling Conclusion"	Season 3, Episode 20	May 7, 1989
Sequel to "Maggie In Peril", Maggie floats in the air hanging on to balloons and lands safely back in her playpen, to the family's relief.
48	"TV Simpsons"	Season 3, Episode 21	May 14, 1989
While Homer is watching a bowling match after stopping the kids from watching The Itchy & Scratchy Show, Bart flies a kite outside with Maggie and Lisa. The wind suddenly blows and the kite gets stuck on the TV antenna, which messes up the reception to Homer's anger. Homer gets a ladder, climbs on the roof and he struggles to get the kite out of the antenna. He eventually becomes furious and shreds the kite into pieces, causing him to lose his balance and fall off the roof, while Lisa and Bart laugh at seeing The Itchy and Scratchy Show, unaware of what just happened.

== See also ==
- List of The Tracey Ullman Show episodes
- List of The Simpsons episodes
- "Treehouse of Horror XXV"
