= Cue Detective =

- The Simpsons episode
- Episode no.: Season 27; Episode 2
- Directed by: Timothy Bailey
- Written by: Joel H. Cohen
- Production code: TABF17
- Original air date: October 4, 2015

Guest appearances
- Alton Brown as himself; Bobby Moynihan as Tyler Boom; Edward James Olmos as Pit Master; Ben Schwartz as Clerk

Episode chronology
← Previous "Every Man's Dream"	Next → "Puffless"
- The Simpsons season 27

"Cue Detective" is the second episode of the twenty-seventh season of the American animated television series The Simpsons, and the 576th episode of the series overall. The episode was directed by Timothy Bailey and written by Joel H. Cohen. It aired in the United States on Fox on October 4, 2015.

In this episode, Homer is challenged to a cooking competition after he finds a grill and becomes popular by making food with it. Bobby Moynihan, Edward James Olmos, and Ben Schwartz guest starred. Alton Brown appeared as himself. The episode received positive reviews.

== Plot ==
At school, the children notice Bart and Lisa smell badly and start teasing them. The same thing happens to Homer at work. Marge discovers the smell is from their clothes because their washing machine is covered in mold. She gives Homer money to buy a new one. Going to the store, Homer discovers a barbecue stand run by an old biker. When Homer eats the best food he ever had, the biker says the smoker was made from a meteorite with a unique beehive shape that traps all the fat and sauce from every grilling. Homer uses the money to buy the smoker.

Marge gets upset that Homer spent her money on a grill but is won over by the food. The aroma draws people to the Simpsons' backyard to feast on the meat. Homer becomes so popular that television chef, Scotty Boom, challenges him to a smoke-off. Whilst preparing for the competition, Homer discovers his smoker has been stolen.

Bart and Lisa discover the thief gave Santa's Little Helper natural peanut butter to distract him. The duo proceeds to the only store that sells natural peanut butter where security footage shows Nelson purchasing it. Bart and Lisa talk to Nelson, who is playing a tablet game with some expensive upgrades. Nelson is reticent. Later, the duo observes him being paid and revealing the smoker. It is too hot for Bart and Lisa to take, and it is driven away on a truck.

Homer, Bart, and Lisa give up hope, but Marge says she can handle the smoke-off with a rented spice rack. At the competition, Marge does her best but fails. However, when Scotty presents his meat, the hive-shaped grill marks on it do not match his normal grill, and he is accused of cheating. Scotty is fired from his show and arrested. Bart and Lisa are confused until they hear the same ringtone they heard when Nelson was delivering the smoker. They chase the phone's owner and discover he is Scotty’s son, Tyler, who framed his father because he was too busy with his show. Tyler had met Nelson playing the tablet game and hired him to steal Homer's smoker to frame his father. Scotty and Tyler reconcile, and Tyler gives Homer's smoker back.

Later, the Simpsons trade the smoker to Nelson for a new washing machine. Eventually, the alien bee people take the hive back into space.

== Production ==
The plot was inspired by the theft of executive producer Matt Selman's family's neighbor's barbecue grill in Georgia. Selman also noted the theft of a grill from John Mueller Meat Company in Austin, Texas the week before the episode aired as life imitating art.

Edward James Olmos was cast as the pitmaster who sells a smoker to Homer. Simpsons regular Hank Azaria played Scotty Boom, a chef who competes against Homer. Bobby Moynihan guest starred as Tyler Boom, Scotty's son. Moynihan tried to avoid acting like restaurateur Guy Fieri, whom he spoofed on Saturday Night Live, but described the character as an "Italian version of Guy Fieri." Chef Alton Brown appeared as himself.

== Cultural references ==
The schoolchildren watch the 1967 film Doctor Dolittle at the beginning of the episode. The film clips are directly taken from the film and are shown in live action. The theme from the anthology television series True Detective plays over the end credits.

== Reception ==
The episode received a 2.7 rating and was watched by a total of 6.02 million people, making it the most watched show on Fox that night.

Dennis Perkins of The A.V. Club gave the episode a B−, who said that the episode is "the sort of well-told, modest Simpsons story that the show can still pull off. It’s not flashy, the sort of everyday Simpsons story that tends to get lost in the din of both subpar late-career Simpsons episodes and people complaining about subpar late-career Simpsons episodes. But if there were more episodes like it, the clamor would die down a bit."

Tony Sokol of Den of Geek gave the episode 3 out of 5 stars. He stated that the episode was a step up from the previous episode, but there were some repeat jokes such as Bender in the basement.
