= Evergreen Terrace (disambiguation) =

Evergreen Terrace is an American metalcore band.

Evergreen Terrace may also refer to:

- Evergreen Terrace, Washington, an unincorporated community
- Evergreen Terrace, a fictional street on The Simpsons that is the location of The Simpsons house
