= Good Night (The Simpsons) =

Animated short film

- The Simpsons short
- The entire family in Homer and Marge's bed during the final scene of the short
- Short no.: 1
- Released during: The Tracey Ullman Show; Season 1 Episode 3b
- Directed by: Wesley Archer; David Silverman; Bill Kopp
- Written by: Matt Groening
- Production code: MG01
- Original air date: April 19, 1987
- Running time: 1:55
- Followed by: "Watching Television"

"Good Night" (also known as "Good Night Simpsons") is the first of the forty-eight Simpsons shorts and the second segment of the third episode of The Tracey Ullman Show's first season. It originally aired on Fox in the USA on April 19, 1987, and was the first appearance of the Simpson family – Homer, Marge, Bart, Lisa, and Maggie – on television. After three seasons on Tracey Ullman's show, the shorts were adapted into the animated show The Simpsons. "Good Night" has since been aired on the show in the episode "The Simpsons 138th Episode Spectacular" (in its entirety), along with several other Ullman shorts, and is one of the few shorts to ever be released on DVD, in the Season 1 DVD set.

== Plot ==
Homer and Marge say goodnight to their children, but all does not go according to plan. Bart tries to ask about the mind, but is left contemplating it as he does not get a proper answer. Lisa fears that bed bugs will eat her after hearing Marge say "Don't let the bed bugs bite". Maggie is terrified by the lyrics of "Rock-a-bye Baby". Ultimately, all three children decide to sleep in their parents' bed.

== Origins ==
Matt Groening first conceived of the Simpsons in the lobby of James L. Brooks' office. He had been called in to pitch a series of animated shorts, and had intended to present his Life in Hell series. When he realized that animating Life in Hell would require him to rescind publication rights for his life's work, Groening decided to go in another direction. He hurriedly sketched out his version of a dysfunctional family, and named the characters after his own family. Bart was modeled after Groening's older brother, Mark, but given a different name that was chosen as an anagram of "brat".

== Production ==
This short was written and storyboarded by Groening. Animation on the short began March 23, 1987. The family was crudely drawn, because Groening had submitted basic sketches to the animators, assuming they would clean them up; instead they just traced over his drawings. It was produced at Klasky Csupo, with Wesley Archer, David Silverman, and Bill Kopp being animators.

The episode is sometimes considered to be the first episode of season 0 of The Simpsons. The show's production number is MG01. Eleven seconds of the short were cut in syndication airings. The short consists of four segments, lasting 24, 15, 33, and 33 seconds, respectively. After the short plays from start to finish in "The Simpsons 138th Episode Spectacular", Troy McClure, who now has a look of disbelief on his face, as though he has never seen the clip before, covers his expression with an awkward laugh and insincerely comments "They haven't changed a bit, have they?", a comment on how the characters' appearance and personalities had altered from the shorts to the airing of that episode.

== Critical reception ==
FilmThreat says "This dark nursery rhyme is funny and disturbing. Homer's voice is totally off the wall, nothing like it stands today, and it's interesting to see how far they've come since these early forays into animation". Todd Doogan of The Digital Bits was sad that "only [one] of the original Tracey Ullman Show shorts" was featured on the first season DVD". He added, "Still, the one you get perfectly illustrates just how far the show has come". DVD.net describes it as "The Simpsons as some of you may never have seen before, drawn by the hand of Matt Groening himself and looking a little worse for wear." DVD Movie Guide says, "I've seen a few additional Ullman shorts and think they're nearly unwatchable, so I can't say I miss them, at least not for their entertainment value. However, they'd make a nice historical addition, so it's too bad we only get this single clip. The first one ever aired, 'Good Night Simpsons', runs for 115 seconds." The Digital Fix says the short extra on the DVD "showcases the superb sense of humour that has made The Simpsons what it is today", and that "the picture quality is quite breathtaking (considering the age of these shorts) while the sound is standard DD2.0 Stereo". It adds that "it is a teaser for something we will supposedly never see (all 48 shorts on DVD)" and wishes they had chosen a short that hadn't been featured in a future episode ("The 138th Episode Spectacular"), and therefore released on the Season 7 box set. Planet Simpson says "the drawing and animation were blatantly crude, thick-lined, and primary-colored" and that "the vignettes were far too short for anything as sophisticated as 'character development'". It adds that the "central gag [of] kids finding ironic horror in bedtime platitudes" was very simplistic, and doubts many people even watched the airing of the short. However, the book explains the significance of "Good Night" as "the first baby steps of an institution that would become one of the most-watched TV shows on earth and the most influential cultural enterprise of its time".

== Home media ==
The short is featured on disc 3 of The Complete First Season DVD.
