= Marge Simpson =

Character from The Simpsons franchise

- The Simpsons character
- First appearance: "Good Night"; The Tracey Ullman Show; April 19, 1987
- Created by: Matt Groening; James L. Brooks; Sam Simon
- Designed by: Matt Groening
- Voiced by: Julie Kavner

In-universe information
- Full name: Marjorie Bouvier Simpson (née Bouvier)
- Occupation: Housewife
- Family: Clancy Bouvier (father; deceased); Jacqueline Bouvier (mother); Patty Bouvier (sister); Selma Bouvier (sister)
- Spouse: Homer Simpson (husband)
- Children: Bart Simpson; Lisa Simpson; Maggie Simpson
- Relatives: Eunice Bouvier (half-great-aunt); Beatrice Bouvier (aunt); Gladys Gurney (aunt, deceased); Lou Gurney (uncle, deceased); Ling Bouvier (adoptive niece)
- Home: 742 Evergreen Terrace, Springfield, United States
- Nationality: American

Marjorie "Marge" Bouvier Simpson (née Bouvier) is a fictional character and one of the main protagonists in the American animated sitcom The Simpsons and part of the eponymous family. Voiced by Julie Kavner, she first appeared on television in The Tracey Ullman Show short "Good Night" on April 19, 1987. Marge was created and designed by cartoonist Matt Groening while he was waiting in the lobby of James L. Brooks' office. Groening had been called to pitch a series of shorts based on Life in Hell but instead decided to create a new set of characters. He based the character on his mother Margaret Groening. After appearing on The Tracey Ullman Show for three seasons, the Simpson family received their own series on Fox, which debuted December 17, 1989.

Marge is the matriarch and housewife of the Simpson family. With her husband Homer, she has three children: Bart, Lisa, and Maggie. Marge is the moralistic force in her family and often provides a grounding voice in the midst of her family's antics by trying to maintain order in the Simpson household. She cooks, cleans, and without her in the Simpson family, they would be in despair. She is often portrayed as a stereotypical television mother and is often included on lists of top "TV moms". She has appeared in other media relating to The Simpsons—including video games, The Simpsons Movie, The Simpsons Ride, commercials, and comic books—and inspired an entire line of merchandise.

Marge's distinctive blue beehive hairstyle was inspired by a combination of the Bride's in Bride of Frankenstein and the style that Margaret Groening wore in the 1960s. Julie Kavner, who was a member of the original cast of The Tracey Ullman Show, was asked to voice Marge so that more voice actors would not be needed. Kavner has won several awards for voicing Marge, including a Primetime Emmy Award for Outstanding Voice-Over Performance in 1992. She was also nominated for an Annie Award for Best Voice Acting in an Animated Feature for her performance in The Simpsons Movie. In 2000, Marge, along with the rest of her family, was awarded a star on the Hollywood Walk of Fame.

== Role in The Simpsons ==
The Simpsons uses a floating timeline (the characters do not physically age), and as such the show is generally assumed to be set in the current year. In several episodes, events have been linked to specific time periods, although this timeline has been contradicted in subsequent episodes. Marge Simpson is married to Homer and mother of Bart, Lisa and Maggie Simpson. She was raised by her parents, Jacqueline and Clancy Bouvier. She has a pair of sisters, the joyless Patty and Selma, both of whom vocally disapprove of Homer. In "The Way We Was" (season two, 1991), it is revealed via flashback that Marge attended Springfield High School, and in her final year met Homer, after they both were sent to detention—Homer for smoking in the bathroom with Barney, and Marge for burning her bra in a feminist protest. She was at first wary of Homer, but agreed to go to the prom with him, although she ended up going with Artie Ziff after Homer received tutoring lessons as a means to get to know her better, while knowing that she needed to sleep for a school meet. However, she regretted going with Artie when he started to pressure her to have sex after prom. At the end of the evening, while Artie drove her home after receiving a slap, she spied Homer walking along the side of the road with the corsage meant for her. After hearing her parents voicing their negative opinions about Homer, she took her own car and went back to give him a ride. She then told Homer she should've gone to the prom with him and he fixes her snapped shoulder strap with the corsage. During the ride, he tells her he will hug her and kiss her and never be able to let her go. After the two had been dating for several years, Marge discovered she was pregnant with Bart, and she and Homer were married in a small wedding chapel across the state line. Bart was born soon after, and the couple bought their first house. The episode "That '90s Show" (season 19, 2008) contradicted much of the established back-story; for example, it was revealed that Marge and Homer were childless in the early 1990s although past episodes had suggested Bart and Lisa were born in the 1980s.

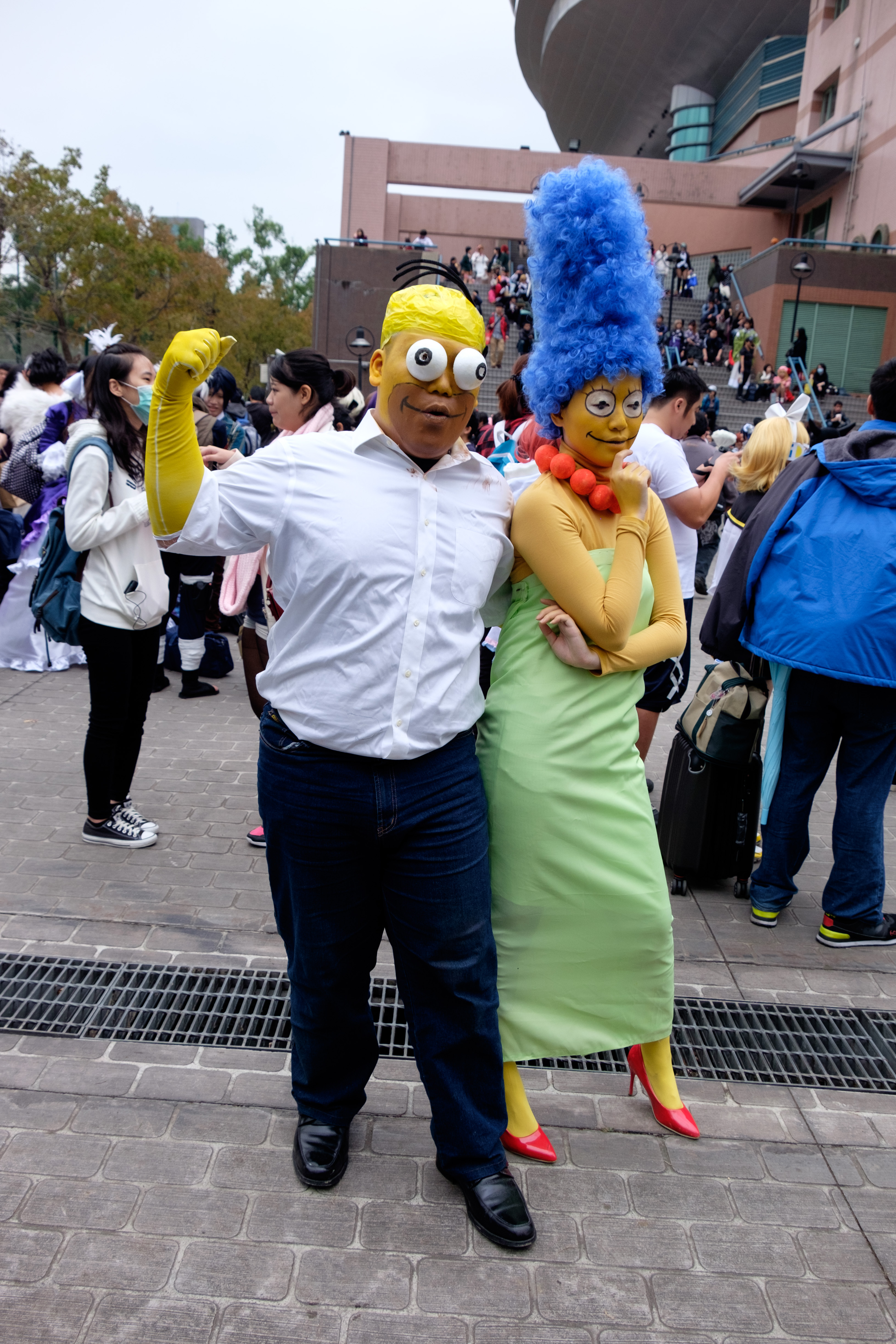
Cosplayers of Homer Simpson and Marge Simpson

As with many Simpsons characters, Marge's age and birthday changes to serve the story. In season one (1990) episodes "Life on the Fast Lane" and "Some Enchanted Evening", Marge was said to be 34. This is also the age given in The Simpsons: A Complete Guide to Our Favorite Family, a book written by The Simpsons' creator, Matt Groening. In "Homer's Paternity Coot" (season 17, 2006), Marge states that Emerald would have been her birthstone if she had been born three months later, placing her birthday sometime in February. In "Regarding Margie" (season 17, 2006), Homer mentioned that Marge was his age, meaning she could have been anywhere between 36 and 40. (Note: Homer's age also fluctuates throughout the series. See Homer Simpson#Role in The Simpsons.) During this episode (Kiss Kiss Bang Bangalore), Lisa questions Homer's memory of Marge's birthday. When he cannot remember, Marge yells that it is in May. In the season eighteen episode "Marge Gamer" she states that she and actor Randy Quaid share the same birthdate (October 1).

Marge has been nonworking for most of the series, choosing to be a homemaker and take care of her family. However, she has held several one-episode jobs in the course of the series. These include working as a nuclear technician alongside Homer at Springfield Nuclear Power Plant in "Marge Gets a Job" (season four, 1992); selling houses in "Realty Bites" (season nine, 1997); owning her own pretzel business in "The Twisted World of Marge Simpson" (season eight, 1997), and working at an erotic bakery in "Sex, Pies and Idiot Scrapes" (season 20, 2008). While Marge has never expressed discontent with her role as a homemaker, she has become bored with it. In "The Springfield Connection" (season six, 1995), Marge decided that she needed more excitement in her life and became a police officer. However, by the end of the episode, she became upset with the corruption in the force and quit.

Marge is generally a stereotypical sitcom mother, and she also plays the "long-suffering wife" who puts up with the antics of her children and her oafish husband. While she usually takes her family's problems with good humor, in "Homer Alone" (season three, 1992), her workload and resultant stress caused her to have a nervous breakdown. After spending time at "Rancho Relaxo", during which her family barely coped with her absence, she returned refreshed and everyone promised to help out more often.

Marge often provides a grounding opinion for Homer and their marriage has often been shaky. Marge admits that she "put[s] up with a lot in [their] marriage," and has left Homer or thrown him out of the house on several occasions. One of the first such episodes to depict this is "Secrets of a Successful Marriage" (season five, 1994), where Homer starts teaching an education class on how to build a successful marriage. He is at first unsuccessful, but gains the interest of the class when he starts giving away family secrets, many of which concern Marge. Upon finding this out, Marge is incensed and throws him out of the house. The next day, Homer is dirty and disheveled, and begs Marge to take him back, saying the one thing he can offer her that nobody else can is "complete and utter dependence." At first, Marge does not see that as a benefit, but eventually admits that he "really [does] make a gal feel needed." Episodes that depict marital problems become more frequent in later seasons of the show.

Through it all, Marge has remained faithful to Homer, despite temptations to the contrary such as the one in "Life on the Fast Lane" (season one, 1990), where she resists Frenchman Jacques and instead chooses to remain with Homer.

Marge in her first televised appearance in "Good Night".

Marge is portrayed to be more caring, understanding, and nurturing toward Bart than Homer, but she refers to him as "a handful" and is often embarrassed by his antics. In "Marge Be Not Proud" (season seven, 1995), she felt she was mothering Bart too much and started acting more distant towards him after he was caught shoplifting. In the beginning of the episode, Bart protested her "over-mothering", but as she started becoming distant, he felt bad about it and made up with her. Marge has expressed understanding for her "special little guy" and has defended him on many occasions. She once said "I know Bart can be a handful, but I also know what he's like inside. He's got a spark. It's not a bad thing ... Of course, it makes him do bad things."

Marge has a good relationship with Lisa and the two are shown to get along quite well. Marge over-mothers Maggie, which causes her to become too clingy and dependent on Marge. Marge maintains a good relationship with her mother Jacqueline and her sisters Patty and Selma, though they disapprove of Homer and are vocal about it. Marge has tolerated their criticism, but has occasionally lost patience with them, once referring to them as "ghouls".

Marge's late father Clancy is rarely referred to in the series and has had speaking parts in only two episodes. It was revealed in "Fear of Flying" (season six, 1994) that Clancy told Marge that he was a pilot, but in reality, he was a flight attendant. Marge discovered this one day and developed aerophobia. In "Jazzy and the Pussycats" (season 18, 2006), Homer casually mentions that they once attended his funeral. It was finally revealed that Clancy died of lung cancer in season 27 episode "Puffless".

Marge is conveyed as having higher morals and is more law-abiding than most other characters. She once led a family values crusade against the violent The Itchy & Scratchy Show and was a prominent member of the "Citizens' Committee on Moral Hygiene". She often serves as a voice of reason for Springfield, though some of the townspeople are frustrated or contemptuous of her failure to recognize or react correctly to breaches of social norms.

Marge is the only member of the family who encourages, and often forces, church attendance. In "Homer the Heretic" (season four, 1992), Homer starts skipping church and Marge tells him "don't make me choose between my man and my God, because you just can't win." Yet, in some episodes, Marge's stereotypical attitude seems to affect her relationship with Lisa, who is a feminist. In "Lisa the Skeptic" (season nine, 1997), an "angel skeleton" is discovered, much to Lisa's skepticism. As Lisa rants about the people who believe it is an angel, Marge informs her that she also believes it is an angel. She tells Lisa, "There has to be more to life than just what we see, everyone needs something to believe in."

In spite of her highly debatable moral stances, Marge struggles with vices, such as a gambling addiction. While Marge has learned to cope with her addiction, it has never completely disappeared and remains an underlying problem that is referenced occasionally on the show.

== Character ==
=== Creation ===
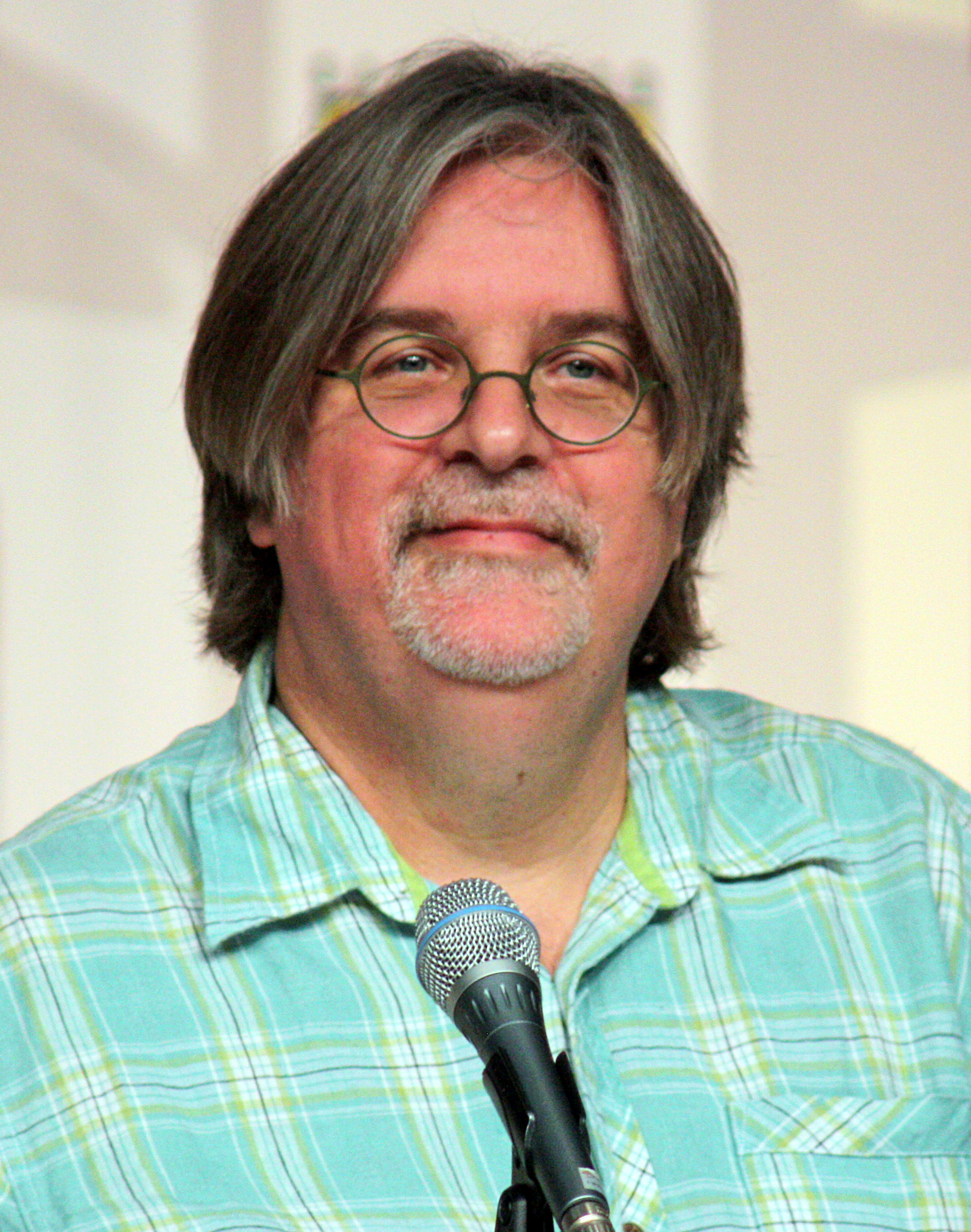
Matt Groening created Marge while waiting in James L. Brooks' office.

Matt Groening first conceived Marge and the rest of the Simpson family in 1987 in the lobby of producer James L. Brooks' office. Groening had been called to pitch a series of animated shorts for The Tracey Ullman Show, and had intended to present an adaptation of his Life in Hell comic strip. When he realized that animating Life in Hell would require him to rescind publication rights, Groening decided to go in another direction and hurriedly sketched out his version of a dysfunctional family, naming the characters after members of his own family. Marge was named after Groening's mother Margaret "Marge" Groening, who has said she bears little similarity to the character, stating, "It's really weird to have people think you're a cartoon." Marge's beehive hairstyle was inspired by the titular Bride in Bride of Frankenstein and the style that Margaret Groening wore during the 1960s, although her hair was never blue.

Marge debuted with the rest of the Simpson family on April 19, 1987, in The Tracey Ullman Show short "Good Night". In 1989, the shorts were adapted into The Simpsons, a half-hour series airing on the Fox Network. Marge and the Simpson family remained the main characters on this new show.

Matt Groening believes that episodes featuring Marge are among the most difficult episodes to write. Bill Oakley believes that the "junior" writers are usually given Marge episodes because he and writing partner Josh Weinstein were given several to write during their first season. During the third season of the show, most of the writers focused on Bart and Homer, so David M. Stern decided to write a Marge episode, which became "Homer Alone" (season three, 1992). He felt that they could achieve a "deeper vein" of comedy in an episode where Marge has a nervous breakdown, and James L. Brooks quickly approved.

=== Design ===
The entire Simpson family was designed so that they would be recognizable in silhouette. The family was crudely drawn, because Groening had submitted basic sketches to the animators, assuming they would clean them up; instead, they just traced over his drawings. To draw Marge, the animators generally start off with a sphere, similar to the way Lisa and Maggie are drawn. The eyes are then drawn, with one roughly in the middle of the sphere, and the other to the front side of the head. Then, the nose and lip are drawn. Her hair is then drawn on top as a long tube coming out of the sphere. An original idea the animators had for when Marge walked through doorways was that her hair would be forced down as she walked through, then once clear of the door, it would spring back and forth. This was never used.

Groening's original plan for Marge's hair was that it would conceal large, Life in Hell-esque rabbit ears. The gag was intended to be revealed in the final episode of the series, but was scrapped early on due to inconsistencies, and also to the fact that rabbit ears would be too fictitious even for The Simpsons.

=== Voice ===
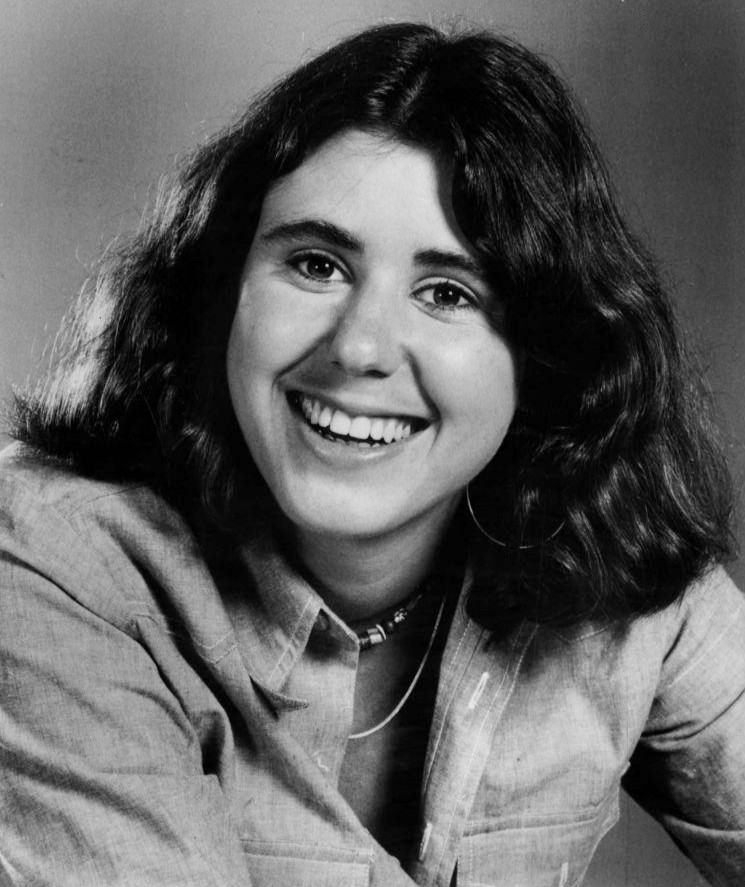
Julie Kavner

Marge's voice is performed by Julie Kavner, who also does the voices of Marge's mother Jacqueline and her sisters Patty and Selma. Kavner had been part of the regular cast of The Tracey Ullman Show. Voices were needed for the shorts, so the producers decided to ask Kavner and fellow cast member Dan Castellaneta to voice Marge and Homer rather than hire more actors. Part of Kavner's contract says that she will never have to promote The Simpsons on video and she rarely performs Marge's voice in public because she believes it "destroys the illusion. People feel these are real people." Kavner takes recording sessions seriously and feels that voice acting is "a little more limiting than live acting. And I have nothing to do with my character's movement."

Marge's raspy voice is only slightly different from Kavner's, who has a "honeyed gravel voice" which she says is due to "a bump on [her] vocal cords." While Marge is her most famous character, Kavner's favorite characters to voice are Patty and Selma because "they're really funny and sad at the same time." In The Simpsons Movie, some scenes, such as Marge's video message to Homer, were recorded over one hundred times, leaving Kavner exhausted. Kristen Bell provided Marge's singing voice in "The Star of the Backstage".

Until 1998, Kavner was paid $30,000 per episode. During a pay dispute in 1998, Fox threatened to replace the six main voice actors with new actors, going as far as preparing to cast new voices. However, the dispute was soon resolved and she received $125,000 per episode until 2004 when the voice actors demanded that they be paid $360,000 an episode. The issue was resolved a month later, and Kavner earned $250,000 per episode. Following salary re-negotiations in 2008, the voice actors receive approximately $400,000 per episode. Three years later, with Fox threatening to cancel the series unless production costs were cut, Kavner and the other cast members accepted a 30 percent pay cut, down to just over $300,000 per episode.

=== Personality ===
Marge is generally a stereotypical sitcom mother, and she also plays the "long-suffering wife" who puts up with the antics of her children and her oafish husband. While she usually takes her family's problems with good humor, in "Homer Alone" (season three, 1992), her workload and resultant stress caused her to have a nervous breakdown. After spending time at "Rancho Relaxo", during which her family barely coped with her absence, she returned refreshed and everyone promised to help out more often.

Marge is more caring, understanding, and nurturing toward Bart than Homer, but she refers to him as "a handful" and is often embarrassed by his antics. In "Marge Be Not Proud" (season seven, 1995), she felt she was mothering Bart too much and started acting more distant towards him after he was caught shoplifting. In the beginning of the episode, Bart protested her "over-mothering", but as she started becoming distant, he felt bad about it and made up with her. Marge has expressed understanding for her "special little guy" and has defended him on many occasions. She once said "I know Bart can be a handful, but I also know what he's like inside. He's got a spark. It's not a bad thing ... Of course, it makes him do bad things."

Marge has a good relationship with Lisa and the two are shown to get along quite well. Marge over-mothers Maggie, which causes her to become too clingy and dependent on Marge. Marge maintains a good relationship with her mother Jacqueline and her sisters Patty and Selma, though they disapprove of Homer and are vocal about it. Marge has tolerated their criticism, but has occasionally lost patience with them, once referring to them as "ghouls".

Marge's late father Clancy is rarely referred to in the series and has had speaking parts in only two episodes. It was revealed in "Fear of Flying" (season six, 1994) that Clancy told Marge that he was a pilot, but in reality, he was a flight attendant. Marge discovered this one day and developed aerophobia. In "Jazzy and the Pussycats" (season 18, 2006), Homer casually mentions that they once attended his funeral. It was finally revealed that Clancy died of lung cancer in season 27 episode "Puffless".

Marge believes she has higher morals and is more law-abiding than most other characters, once leading a family values crusade against the violent The Itchy & Scratchy Show and being a prominent member of the "Citizens' Committee on Moral Hygiene". She often provides a voice of reason for the town itself, but many of the townspeople are frustrated or contemptuous of her failure to recognize or react correctly to breaches of social norms.

Marge is often depicted as the only member of the family who encourages, and often forces, church attendance. In "Homer the Heretic" (season four, 1992), Homer starts skipping church and Marge tells him "don't make me choose between my man and my God, because you just can't win." Yet, in some episodes, Marge's stereotypical attitude seems to affect her relationship with Lisa, who is a feminist. In "Lisa the Skeptic" (season nine, 1997), an "angel skeleton" is discovered, much to Lisa's skepticism. As Lisa rants about the people who believe it is an angel, Marge informs her that she also believes it is an angel. She tells Lisa, "There has to be more to life than just what we see, everyone needs something to believe in."

In spite of her highly debatable moral stances, Marge struggles with vices, such as a gambling addiction. While Marge has learned to cope with her addiction, it has never completely disappeared and remains an underlying problem that is referenced occasionally on the show. Marge is also known to suffer OCD as shown when she won a house cleaning but she then cleaned the whole house herself and it thus led to her accidentally causing her to suffer amnesia. Another time is when the family had to house sit for Mr. Burns, she forced Lisa and herself to clean the entire mansion.

Politically, Marge generally aligns with the Democratic Party, having supported the candidacy of her state's progressive governor Mary Bailey, and voted for Jimmy Carter in both of his presidential elections. She was also deeply affected by the death of Lyndon B. Johnson, to the point where she wanted him to be alive so badly that she kept seeing him everywhere she looked.

== Reception ==
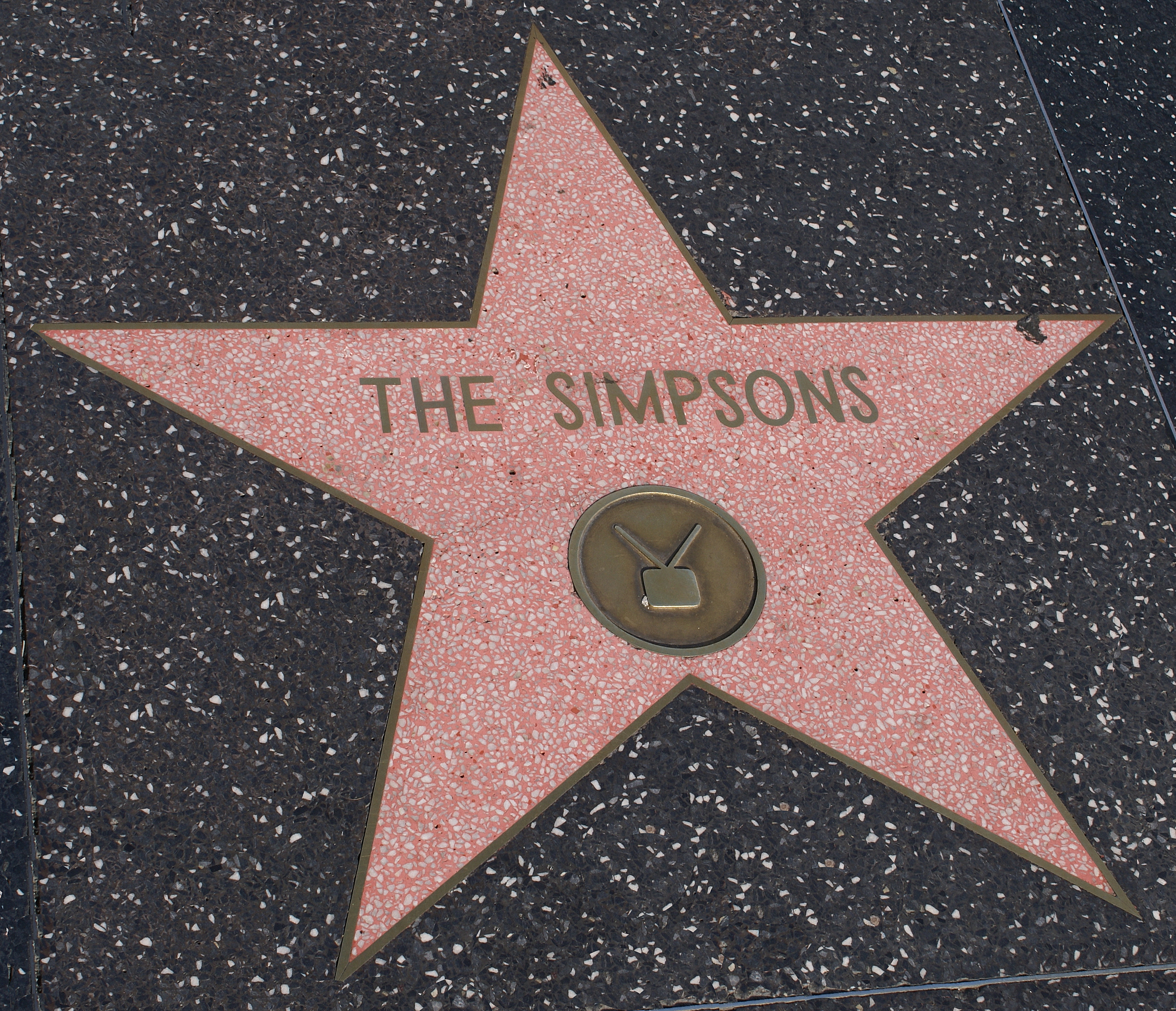
In 2000, Marge, along with the rest of the Simpson family, was awarded a star on the Hollywood Walk of Fame.

At the 44th Primetime Emmy Awards, Kavner received a Primetime Emmy Award for Outstanding Voice-Over Performance for voicing Marge in the season three episode "I Married Marge". In 2004, Kavner and Dan Castellaneta (the voice of Homer) won a Young Artist Award for "Most Popular Mom & Dad in a TV Series". For her performance in The Simpsons Movie, Kavner was nominated for "Best Voice Acting in an Animated Feature" at the 2007 Annie Awards, but lost to Ian Holm from Ratatouille. Kavner's emotional performance in the movie got positive reviews and one critic said she "gave what must be the most heartfelt performance ever." Various episodes in which Marge is prominently featured have been nominated for Emmy Awards for Outstanding Animated Program, including "The Way We Weren't" in 2004 and "Life on the Fast Lane", which won the award in 1990. In 2000, Marge and the rest of the Simpson family were awarded a star on the Hollywood Walk of Fame located at 7021 Hollywood Boulevard.

Marge has been ranked highly in lists of the top television mothers of all time. She was ranked first on Entertainment Weekly's list in 1994; first on Fox News' list in 2005; eighth on CityNews' list in 2008; and was included in Time's list of the "10 Best Moms Ever". In a 2004 poll in the United Kingdom, Marge was named the "most respected mother" by respondents. Still in 2004, Marge was ranked third in a poll conducted by the Opinion Research Company. In May 2012, Marge was one of the 12 moms chosen by users of iVillage on their list of "Mommy Dearest: The TV Moms You Love". AOL has named Marge the 24th "Most Memorable Female TV Character". Her relationship with Homer was included in TV Guide's list of "The Best TV Couples of All Time".

Religious writer Kenneth Briggs has written that "Marge is my candidate for sainthood ... She lives in the real world, she lives with crises, with flawed people. She forgives and she makes her own mistakes. She is a forgiving, loving person ... absolutely saintly."

Marge and Lisa are James L. Brooks's favorite characters in the series, and the two with whom he identifies with most. Matt Groening has spoken fondly of them, stating "I love Lisa Simpson the most, because she seems like the one character that's going to evolve and eventually escape Springfield. The rest seem pretty oblivious and like they're stuck there."

== Cultural influence ==
Dear First Lady, I recently read your criticism of my family. I was deeply hurt. Heaven knows we're far from perfect and, if truth be known, maybe just a wee bit short from normal; but as Dr. Seuss says, "a person is a person". I try to teach my children ... always to give somebody the benefit of the doubt and not talk badly about them, even if they're rich. It's hard to get them to understand this advice when the very First Lady in the country calls us not only dumb, but "the dumbest thing" she ever saw. I hope there is some way out of this controversy. I thought, perhaps, it would be a good start to just speak my mind.

— Marge Simpson in her letter to Barbara Bush

The edition of October 1, 1990, of People included an interview with then-First Lady of the United States Barbara Bush. The article included the following passage: "She loves America's Funniest Home Videos but remains baffled after sampling The Simpsons. "It was the dumbest thing I had ever seen," she says, "but it's a family thing, and I guess it's clean." The writers decided to respond by privately sending a polite letter on September 28 to Bush where they posed as Marge Simpson. On October 9, Bush sent a reply: "Dear Marge, How kind of you to write. I'm glad you spoke your mind ... I foolishly didn't know you had one. I am looking at a picture of you ... depicted on a plastic cup ... with your blue hair filled with pink birds peeking out all over. Evidently, you and your charming family — Lisa, Homer, Bart and Maggie — are camping out. It's a nice family scene. Clearly you are setting a good example for the rest of the country. Please forgive a loose tongue."

In 2002, opponents of the Seattle Monorail Project planned on showing the episode "Marge vs. the Monorail" at a protest event. Following complaints, 20th Century Fox sent a letter to the event organizers ordering that the episode not be shown due to copyright laws. In 2004, Marge appeared on Channel 4 in the United Kingdom for the Alternative Christmas message, which is annually broadcast at the same time that Queen Elizabeth II gives her Christmas message.

On April 9, 2009, the United States Postal Service unveiled a series of five 44-cent stamps featuring Marge and the four other members of the Simpson family. They are the first characters from a television series to receive this recognition while the show is still in production. The stamps, designed by Matt Groening, were made available for purchase on May 7, 2009.

Marge makes an appearance in the Fortnite crossover event featuring The Simpsons in November 2025 as a playable cosmetic character. She appears as a skin for players to purchase.

=== Merchandising ===
Marge is depicted in much The Simpsons-related merchandise, including T-shirts, baseball caps, bumper stickers, cardboard stand-ups, refrigerator magnets, key rings, buttons, dolls, posters and figurines. She has appeared in most of The Simpsons video games. Besides the television series, Marge regularly appears in issues of Simpsons Comics, which were published from 1993 to 2018. Marge also plays a role in The Simpsons Ride, launched in 2008 at Universal Studios Florida and Hollywood.

Marge appeared in a 2005 advertisement for Dove Styling, where her normal beehive hair was exchanged for a more stylish look for a series of ads featuring several popular cartoon women.

In April 2004, Marge appeared on the cover of Maxim. She also appeared on the cover of the November 2009 issue of Playboy, becoming the first cartoon character to appear on the cover. The cover and a three-page picture spread, as well as a story inside entitled The Devil in Marge Simpson, commemorated the 20th anniversary of The Simpsons, but as also part of a plan to appeal to younger readers, a decision which has been criticized due to a page in which the character is depicted nude. Darine Stern's picture on the October 1971 cover served as the inspiration for Playboy's November 2009 cover.
