= Maggie Simpson =

Fictional character from The Simpsons franchise

- The Simpsons character
- First appearance: "Good Night"; The Tracey Ullman Show; April 19, 1987
- Created by: Matt Groening
- Voiced by: Nancy Cartwright (later seasons–present); Yeardley Smith (earlier seasons)

In-universe information
- Full name: Margaret Simpson
- Family: Homer and Marge (parents); Bart and Lisa (siblings)
- Home: 742 Evergreen Terrace, Springfield

Margaret "Maggie" Simpson is a fictional character in the animated television series The Simpsons. She debuted in the Tracey Ullman Show short "Good Night" in 1987. Maggie was created and designed by cartoonist Matt Groening, who named her after his youngest sister. The shorts aired from 1987 to 1989 before The Simpsons debuted on Fox on December 17, 1989. Maggie is the youngest child of Homer and Marge, and the younger sister of Bart and Lisa. Groening and early producer Gábor Csupó recorded Maggie's pacifier sound. Nancy Cartwright currently provides her vocalizations; which were previously performed by Yeardley Smith.

She has appeared in other Simpsons media, including The Simpsons Movie and The Simpsons Ride. Maggie-centered moments in episodes such as "And Maggie Makes Three" and "Lisa's First Word" have received praise. IGN ranked Taylor's guest performance as Maggie among the series' best.

== Role in The Simpsons ==
Maggie is the youngest child of Marge and Homer, and the younger sister of Bart and Lisa. Like her family, she does not age because the series uses a floating timeline. Episodes set in the future show an older Maggie, including as a rock star in "Holidays of Future Passed". Six years after Lisa's birth, Homer left the Springfield Nuclear Power Plant but returned for its higher pay when Marge became pregnant with Maggie. He found in Maggie the motivation to keep working there.

In earlier seasons, Maggie often tripped over her clothing and fell on her face, making a loud thud; though this gag became less frequent later. She is usually shown sucking her pacifier. Maggie is often portrayed as unusually intelligent for an infant. She has spelled out E=MC² with her baby blocks, driven Homer's car, and escaped from the Springfield daycare center after liberating its pacifiers. Her family often overlooks these actions. In "Who Shot Mr. Burns?", she shoots Mr. Burns, though whether intentionally remains unclear. In "Poppa's Got a Brand New Badge", she deliberately shoots a group of mobsters with a rifle to save Homer. Maggie has also saved Homer from drowning and from being shot by Russ Cargill.

== Development ==
=== Creation and design ===
Maggie in "Good Night", her first appearance

In 1986, while waiting in James L. Brooks's office, Matt Groening created Maggie and the Simpson family as an alternative to adapting his Life in Hell comic strip, which would have required relinquishing its publication rights. He instead sketched a dysfunctional family and named its characters after his own family, including Maggie after his youngest sister. Maggie and her family debuted on April 19, 1987, in the short "Good Night". In 1989, the shorts became The Simpsons, a half-hour Fox series.

Groening designed the Simpson family to be recognizable in silhouette. The original shorts retained the rough appearance of his sketches because the animators traced them instead of cleaning them up as he expected. Working in black and white, he gave Lisa and Maggie spiky "starfish" hair without considering how it would look in color. Groening made Maggie largely silent but able to express any emotion a scene required.

=== Voice ===
Maggie rarely speaks. In the family's first Tracey Ullman Show short, Liz Georges voiced Maggie's only line, "Good night, Dad". In "Lisa's First Word", Maggie's first word in the series' continuity is "Daddy". Elizabeth Taylor voiced the line. Taylor had to record the line numerous times before the producers were satisfied. Guest actors have also voiced Maggie in imagined stories and episodes set in the future. Jodie Foster performed a monologue in the The Fountainhead parody in "Four Great Women and a Manicure" (2009), and Lindsay Lohan voiced an older Maggie in "Parahormonal Activity" (2025).

Maggie is best known for her pacifier sound, recorded by Matt Groening and Gábor Csupó. The series continued to reuse Groening's original recording through at least 1998. Early episodes sometimes played the sound over dialogue, but the producers discontinued this because it was found distracting. Yeardley Smith provided Maggie's squeals, babbling, and other vocalizations in earlier episodes, and Nancy Cartwright in later ones.

== Other media and merchandising ==
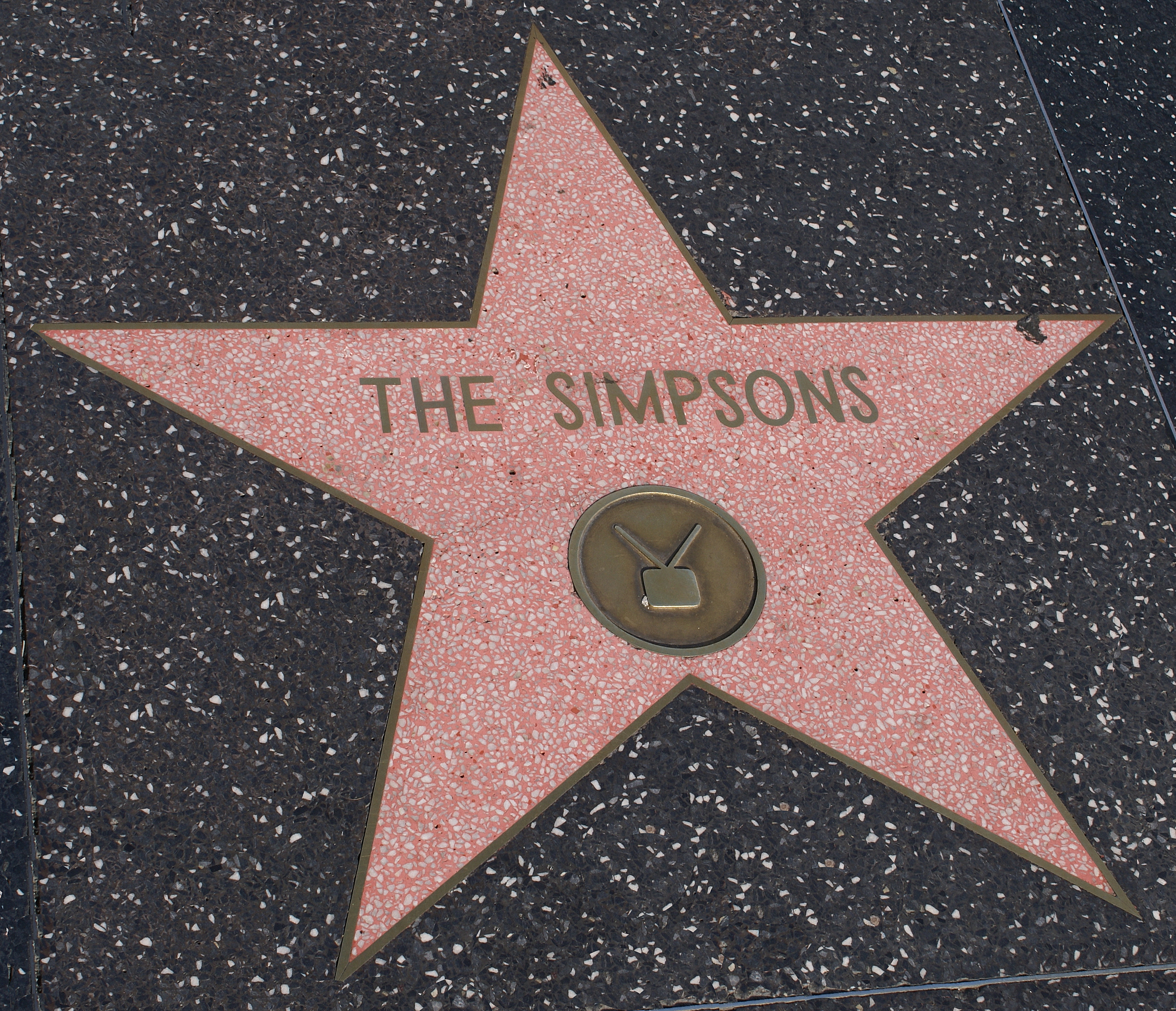
The Hollywood Walk of Fame star awarded to The Simpsons in 2000

Four animated short films center on Maggie: The Longest Daycare, Playdate with Destiny, The Force Awakens from Its Nap, and Rogue Not Quite One. The Longest Daycare was made in 3D and shown in theaters before Ice Age: Continental Drift in 2012. Playdate with Destiny was shown before Onward in 2020. Two Star Wars-themed shorts followed: The Force Awakens from Its Nap, released for Star Wars Day in 2021, and Rogue Not Quite One in 2023.

In 1991, HarperCollins published four children's books by Maggie Groening and Matt Groening: Maggie Simpson's Book of Animals, Maggie Simpson's Counting Book, Maggie Simpson's Book of Colors and Shapes, and Maggie Simpson's Alphabet Book. Maggie is playable in The Simpsons Game. She also appears in the mobile game The Simpsons: Tapped Out. She appears in The Simpsons Ride, which opened in 2008 at Universal Studios Florida and Universal Studios Hollywood. In 2009, the USPS issued stamps featuring the five members of the Simpson family; Maggie's was voted the most popular in an online USPS poll. In 2000, Maggie and the rest of the Simpson family were awarded a star on the Hollywood Walk of Fame.

== Reception ==
Dennis Perkins of The A.V. Club praised the expressive animation and visual storytelling in a largely wordless Maggie story, but felt that the recurring portrayal of her as a "secret baby genius" had grown stale. Alyssa Rosenberg of The Washington Post called Maggie's adventures "a beautiful testament to the minds of children who have not yet learned to talk". Erik Adams, also of The A.V. Club, wrote that there was a "purity" to Homer's relationship with Maggie and called the ending of "And Maggie Makes Three" "perfectly heartwarming". Comedian Ricky Gervais similarly named the episode his second-favorite, saying its final scene gave him "a lump in the throat". GQ wrote that Maggie's relationship with her parents retained a "sweet, uncomplicated purity". /Film called the episode a "grounded and truly affecting story", while The Independent wrote that its ending showed how working families sacrifice dreams for love.

Todd Everett of Variety called Maggie's first-word scene in "Lisa's First Word" "quite a heart-melter". Tom Shales of The Washington Post called the scene "genuinely touching, as well as funny". Entertainment Weekly listed it among the episode's "emotional high points". A Los Angeles Times roundup called the scene adorable and touching but said Taylor's casting was unnecessary. In 2006, IGN ranked Elizabeth Taylor's performance as Maggie in "Lisa's First Word" thirteenth on its "Top 25 Simpsons Guest Appearances" list. Writing in The Guardian, Peter Bradshaw called Taylor an "inspired casting choice".

The Village Voice praised The Longest Daycare for its narrative control. SFGate wrote that the short had more "imagination, pathos and suspense" than the feature that followed it, while the Los Angeles Times called it "superbly crafted". The short was nominated for an Academy Award for Best Animated Short Film and an Annie Award; The Force Awakens from Its Nap was nominated for a Primetime Emmy Award for Outstanding Short Form Animated Program.
