= The Simpsons house =

Fictional street address in Springfield of the Simpson family home

742 Evergreen Terrace
- The Simpsons location
- The exterior, as seen in the episode "Beyond Blunderdome" (1999)
- First appearance: "Good Night" (1987)
- Created by: Matt Groening

In-universe information
- Other name: The Simpsons' house
- Type: Residential house
- Location: Springfield, United States
- Characters: Homer Simpson; Marge Simpson; Bart Simpson; Lisa Simpson; Maggie Simpson; Santa's Little Helper; Snowball II

The Simpsons house is the residence of the Simpson family in the animated sitcom The Simpsons and its film adaptation The Simpsons Movie. The house's address is most frequently attributed as 742 Evergreen Terrace. In the series, the house is occupied by Homer and Marge Simpson and their three children: Bart, Lisa, and Maggie.

To the left of the Simpsons' house (as seen from the street) is Ned Flanders' house. The house to the right has been occupied by numerous owners in different episodes including Mr. and Mrs. Winfield, Ruth and Laura Powers, Sideshow Bob, and the extended Flanders family.

The street name is in reference to series creator Matt Groening's childhood street in Portland, Oregon. The house's address was inconsistent in earlier seasons, with the address being given various numbers on Evergreen Terrace, and one address on a different street.

In 1997, a real-life replica of the house was constructed at 712 Red Bark Lane in Henderson, Nevada, and given away as the grand prize in a contest, though the winner chose a cash option instead of the house.

== In-universe ==
The house's first chronological appearance is in the flashback episode "Lisa's First Word", when Homer and Marge purchase it. The house was auctioned to Ned Flanders in "No Loan Again, Naturally" and since then leased to the Simpsons.

In The Simpsons Movie, the house and all of the family's possessions are completely destroyed by a sinkhole under Maggie's sandbox, which expands after the Simpsons escape through it and the police fire their service weapons into it. At the end of the film, the townsfolk and the family themselves rebuild the house in exactly the same manner as it was before, restoring the "status quo".

The opening sequence and the couch gag of "He Loves to Fly and He D'ohs", the first episode to air after the release of the film, show the house still under construction, along with the whole town rebuilding after the film's events.

== Design ==
The Simpsons house is shown as a light pink or light brown two-story detached house with an attached garage, basement, and loft. A suburban tract house, the building is at least 50 feet (15 m) wide. The arched front door leads directly into the foyer where an arch to the left leads to the sitting room, and one to the right leads into the dining room. In some episodes, such as "Opposites A-Frack", there is a half bathroom in the foyer. There is also a small cupboard and stairs to the second floor. The sitting room and the dining room both feature bay windows. At the back of the house is the living room and the kitchen. Towards the house's rear are stairs to the basement, which are replaced by a closet in some episodes. Though rarely seen, there is also a hallway off the kitchen leading to a recreation room.

The second story of the house features Marge and Homer's bedroom (with an ensuite bathroom), Bart's bedroom, Lisa's bedroom, Maggie's bedroom, and a bathroom. On the landing, there is a hatch that leads to the attic.

The backyard of the house is surrounded by a wooden picket fence and a low box hedge. It features a patio and Bart's treehouse, from which the "Treehouse of Horror" Halloween specials take their name. Occasionally, there is a hammock tied to two trees near the fence that borders Ned Flanders's backyard.

The house floor plan used by writers in the 1990s was shared by former Simpsons writer Josh Weinstein.

The most commonly used address for the Simpsons' house is 742 Evergreen Terrace, however other addresses have been provided. Episodes "Blood Feud" and "Bart the Lover" give the address as 94 Evergreen Terrace, "Mr. Lisa Goes to Washington" gives it as 59 Evergreen Terrace, "Homer the Vigilante" as 723 Evergreen Terrace, "New Kid On the Block" as 1094 Evergreen Terrace, and "Kamp Krusty" as 430 Spalding Way (theorised to be a reference to actor and playwright Spalding Gray).

== Features and furniture ==
The basement always includes a washing machine, a clothes dryer, and, after the episode "Blood Feud", a large Olmec statue of a head which was a present from Mr. Burns given to Bart in that episode. The appearance of other features such as a furnace, ping-pong table, air hockey set, and water softener varies from episode to episode. The basement is often used as a "secret lair", where Homer hides after faking the kidnapping of Mr. Burns's son in "Burns, Baby Burns", brews alcohol to beat prohibition in "Homer vs. the Eighteenth Amendment", hides his superhero operation as Pie Man in "Simple Simpson", and where Marge hides during a spell of agoraphobia in "Strong Arms of the Ma". Bart hints in one episode that the basement has a problem with radon gas, then lets a homeless man sleep there in "The Day the Violence Died". It is revealed in the episode "Father Knows Worst" that there is a sauna behind the water heater that was covered up by paint and dust, but which Marge accidentally found.

A simple painting of a boat hangs on the wall above the living room couch. Marge says she painted it for Homer in "The Trouble with Trillions". In the episode "Diatribe of a Mad Housewife", the painting has a plaque saying it was based on a scene from Moby Dick. In the Season 27 episode "Barthood", young Lisa is seen drawing the sail boat painting. In the episode "Homer and Ned's Hail Mary Pass", Homer destroys the painting over the couch and Marge retrieves a replica out of a closet. The painting is also destroyed by Lisa's guinea pig in "The War of Art" but it gets replaced with a replica made by a famous art forger.

In the "Treehouse of Horror IV" episode, a Dogs Playing Poker painting appears above the sofa. In "Treehouse of Horror VI", there is a portal behind the bookcase in the sitting room that leads to the third dimension, a reference to The Twilight Zone episode "Little Girl Lost". However, Treehouse of Horror episodes are not canonical.

== Condition ==
The house is often shown as dilapidated. For example, the walls are painted with lead paint and the roof leaks. In "All's Fair in Oven War", the kitchen receives an extensive modern remodel, but it reverts to its previous appearance in the following episode. One running gag shows the interior of the walls and floors filled with dangerous or unusual items when the camera pans between floors or rooms. Some of these unusual items include: asbestos, toxic waste, hidden treasure, recording devices, baby dinosaurs, dancing mice and the family cat, Snowball II. However, the lived-in spaces are usually kept neat by Marge. In one episode Moe Szyslak observes that it contains no silverfish.

Many episodes in which Springfield is hit by extreme heat waves indicate that the house lacks air conditioning. In a flashback episode, Homer steals Ned Flanders' air conditioner and puts it in the window. The house is shown to have a gas furnace, as well as a gas stove, water heater, and dryer. In "Days of Wine and D'oh'ses", Homer reroutes the gas line to turn a totem pole into a fire-breathing "god," filling the entire house with gas in the process.

== Real-life version ==
The Simpsons House
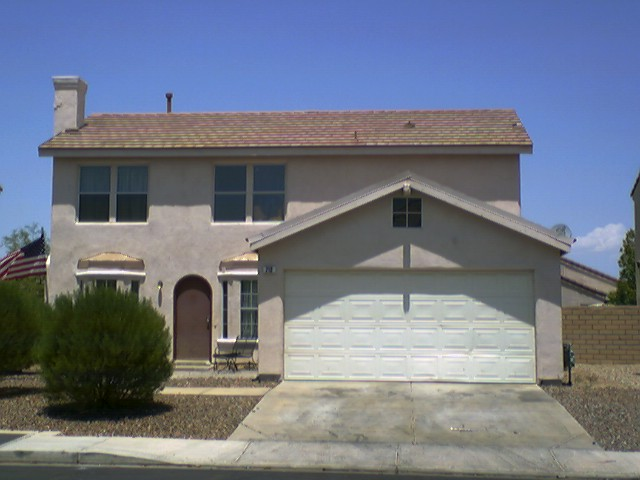
- The house in 2007, after having been remodeled to remove details relating to the television series

General information
- Location: 712 Red Bark Lane, Henderson 89011, United States
- Construction started: May–June 1997
- Completed: July 1997
- Client: Barbara Howard (Contest Winner)

Technical details
- Size: 2,200 square feet

Design and construction
- Architects: Michael Woodley, Manny Gonzalez

A replica of the house was constructed in 1997 by California-based Kaufman and Broad homebuilders at 712 Red Bark Lane in Henderson, Nevada. The house was designed to closely mimic the design of the house in the series.

The $120,000 house was constructed for use as the grand prize in a contest known as "The Simpsons House Give Away", sponsored by Pepsi, Fox, and the homebuilder. The contest was announced on July 10, 1997. The rules of the contest stipulated that the winner either accept the house or a $75,000 cash payment. In addition, the winner of the house, if they chose to occupy it, was contractually obligated to repaint the exterior in accordance with the local homeowner's association rules. Contest entries were included on various Pepsi products and 15 million were submitted nationally. The winner was Barbara Howard from Richmond, Kentucky. Howard chose not to accept the house, instead taking a cash payment per the contest rules. In 2001, after most of the details relating to the television series were removed, the house was sold by the builder to another owner.

The house, located in a subdivision that was permanently named "Springfield South Valley Ranch", took 49 days to build and was unveiled to the public on August 1, 1997. Construction on the house was nearly complete by July 1997, and by September 1997 thousands of people were lining up to see the finished product. During the time it was open to the public in August and September 1997, more than 30,000 people visited the house, including The Simpsons creator Matt Groening.

=== Design ===
The Simpsons House was designed by Kaufman and Broad homebuilders. The idea for a replica of the Simpsons house was first conceived when game designers were working on 3D visualizations at Fox Interactive for the 1997 video game The Simpsons: Virtual Springfield.

In preparation for the project the design team viewed episodes of The Simpsons to use as a guide for the home's design. Dozens of episodes were viewed so that the design was drawn directly from the animation. Early on it became clear that the cartoon house was not structurally sound; in the show the home has no load-bearing walls. The finished replica, however, met all building codes. The architects focused their efforts on Bart's bedroom and the television room, making sure those rooms were as close to the reality of the series as possible. One of the challenges architects faced was the constantly changing nature of the onscreen house. For instance, the bay window has changed shape through the years.

When it was constructed the four-bedroom, two-story house was painted bright yellow and baby blue on its exterior, to resemble the exterior of 742 Evergreen Terrace. The house included exterior details from The Simpsons such as Bart's treehouse, a swing set, and a back yard barbecue. The 2,200-square-foot (200 m^{2}) house also has two bathrooms, and two front bay windows, again mimicking the cartoon house. The lot size necessitated the house be just 40 feet (12 m) wide, compared to the cartoon house, which is at least 50 feet (15 m) wide.

Before it was altered, the interior rooms were designed to mirror those in the series. The television room included a large sofa. The living room had brightly painted walls, matching those in the series, and a two-tone orange fireplace. The kitchen featured a checkered linoleum floor. The house included 1,500 Simpsons-themed props, such as Duff Beer cans and the corn cob curtains in the kitchen. Some of the paint colors used on the interior included "Power Orange", "Generator Green", and "Pink Flamingo".

The team's goal was to be 90 percent normal, with occasional lapses into cartoon continuity. Door frames were widened and lengthened to accommodate Marge's hair and Homer's girth. The stairs leading to the second floor were slightly steeper than normal. The downstairs floor was poured and painted concrete rather than hardwood or carpet, the better to mimic the show's flat colors. Bart's treehouse was erected in the backyard.

To achieve a lived-in look, Hollywood production designer and photographer Rick Floyd accentuated the home with details with the aim to impress series creator Matt Groening and die-hard fans alike. Floyd hung corn cob-patterned curtains in the kitchen; Bart's bedroom closet held a row of identical shirts and shorts; mouse holes were painted on the walls near the floor; Lisa's saxophone leaned against her bed. Floyd painted an oil stain in the driveway, a nod to Homer's lack of automotive maintenance, and also flagged down a vehicle he saw while driving and offered the owner $700 for it. Painted purple, it was a perfect match for the Simpsons' family car.
