= Separate Vocations =

- The Simpsons episode
- Episode no.: Season 3 Episode 18
- Directed by: Jeffrey Lynch
- Written by: George Meyer
- Production code: 8F15
- Original air date: February 27, 1992

Guest appearances
- Marcia Wallace as Edna Krabappel; Steve Allen as Bart's electronically altered voice

Episode features
- Chalkboard gag: Opening sequence: "I will not barf unless I'm sick" During the episode: "I will not expose the ignorance of the faculty"
- Couch gag: Bart leaps into everyone's lap.
- Commentary: Matt Groening; Mike Reiss; Jon Vitti; David Silverman; Al Jean

Episode chronology
← Previous "Homer at the Bat"	Next → "Dog of Death"
- The Simpsons season 3

"Separate Vocations" is the eighteenth episode of the third season of the American animated television series The Simpsons. It originally aired on Fox in the United States on February 27, 1992.

In the episode, the students of Springfield Elementary School take career aptitude tests. Lisa and Bart's test results inspire drastic changes in their behavior: Lisa's test says she should become a homemaker, her dreams of being a professional musician become shattered and she turns into a delinquent troublemaker at school; Bart's test says he should become a police officer, and Principal Skinner makes Bart hall monitor.

The episode was written by George Meyer and directed by Jeffrey Lynch. American actor and television personality Steve Allen guest starred in the episode as the electronically altered voice of Bart in a fantasy sequence.

Since airing, the episode has received mostly positive reviews from television critics. It acquired a Nielsen Rating of 14.8 and was the highest-rated show on Fox the week it aired.

== Plot ==
The students at Springfield Elementary School are assigned to take the Career Aptitude Normalizing Test (CANT). The test has been designed to tell each student which career they will be best suited for in adult life.

After the test results come back, Lisa's test says she would be best suited for homemaking. Heartbroken, she tries to prove the test results are wrong and consults a music teacher about her dream of becoming a professional saxophone player. He tells her that she has talent, but she can never be a professional saxophone player because she has inherited her father's stubby fingers. Believing she will never achieve any of her dreams, Lisa also loses interest in her academic pursuits and lapses into nihilism.

Meanwhile, Bart's test says he would be best suited to be a police officer. Bart goes for a police ride-along with Eddie and Lou, and he helps them apprehend Snake during a car chase. Bart becomes impressed with the police officers' authority and qualified immunity. When Principal Skinner discovers Bart's new interest in law enforcement, he gives Bart the job of hall monitor. Bart issues demerits to students for minor infractions and restores order to the school.

Lisa begins rebelling at school. She encounters two delinquent students smoking in the bathroom and suggests they TP Skinner's beloved school mascot, a puma statue. After insulting Miss Hoover, Lisa gets put in detention; while serving detention alone, Lisa steals the teachers' answer keys, exposing the teachers' ignorance. Skinner and Bart set out to find the answer keys and punish the person who stole them. However, when Bart finds out that Lisa is the culprit, he takes the blame for the theft because he does not want her to ruin her promising future. Skinner sentences Bart with detention for the rest of the school year. While Bart is in detention, Lisa consoles him by playing her saxophone outside the classroom.

== Production ==
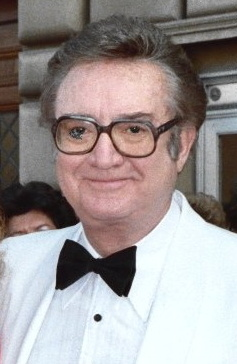
Steve Allen guest stars.

The episode was written by George Meyer and directed by Jeffrey Lynch. Mike Reiss, show runner of The Simpsons with Al Jean at the time, said Meyer wrote most of the episode by himself without help from the show's other writers. Few changes were made to the first draft that he pitched to the producers; it was near identical to the final script. The episode was inspired by the vocational tests taken by several members of the show's staff when they went to school; Reiss, for example, said he was told he would become a librarian. Jean said "one of the first things that sold us on doing the episode" was the idea of Bart becoming a policeman. He said it was "a funny, realistic depiction of what a kid like Bart might wind up to become, and it wasn't something you would immediately think of". Jean said the episode deals with the emotion that many adults feel when they grow older and realize they are not going to achieve the dreams they once had. "[It's about] how people in life cope with that problem. Maybe Lisa, at eight years old, is a little bit young to worry about that, but that's what we were trying to explore here."

In one sequence Bart imagines himself testifying in court, with his voice electronically altered. The altered voice was provided by American actor and television personality Steve Allen. Series creator Matt Groening said he and some of the writers who were old enough to remember Allen's TV show from the 1950s–60s were thrilled to have him guest-star, especially John Swartzwelder. It took nine takes for Allen to pronounce Bart's catchphrase "¡Ay, caramba!" correctly, to the point where the staff began to get slightly frustrated with him. There was a discussion amongst the writing team of whether the episode should end with a joke or have a "sweet" ending. Reiss said "With the better angels in our nature, we went with the sweet ending [of Lisa playing her saxophone for Bart]." Allen would guest star again (this time as himself) in the season 6 episode "'Round Springfield".

This episode contains the first mention of Skinner being a Vietnam War veteran, a trope that would later become a recurring gag throughout the series.

== Cultural references ==
The music school that Lisa visits has a sign out front with a picture of a diapered baby Ludwig van Beethoven on it. When Principal Skinner is questioning Lisa about her newfound sense of irresponsibility, he asks "What are you rebelling against?" She responds "Whaddaya got?", like Marlon Brando's character Johnny Strabler did in The Wild One (1953). She has a toothpick in her mouth, like Johnny in the film. The fifth graders whom Lisa talks to in the school washroom are smoking Laramie cigarettes.

The car chase scene with Snake is a reference to the chase scene in Bullitt (1968). Music similar to the soundtrack of The Streets of San Francisco is heard in the scene. Alf Clausen, a composer on The Simpsons who had previously worked on several police shows, wrote the music for the scene. In another reference to The Streets of San Francisco and other Quinn Martin productions, a voice-over and caption proclaims the name of act two of the episode, "Act II - Death Drives a Stick", after the episode's first act break in the middle of the Snake car chase. In the sequence where Bart imagines himself testifying in court, his face is obscured with a blue dot; this is a references to the television coverage of the rape trial of William Kennedy Smith, in which the woman who accused Smith of raping her was obscured with a blue dot over her face. The way the scene changes from Bart and Skinner talking in Skinner's office to them searching through the lockers is a reference to the same style of scene change used in the 1960s Batman television series, in which a close-up of Batman's face with dramatic music is shown for a brief moment before the scene changes. The song heard when Bart and Skinner search through the lockers for the Teachers' Editions is a variation of Harold Faltermeyer's "Axel F" from Beverly Hills Cop (1984).

== Analysis ==
In the last scene of the episode, Bart is seen writing "I will not expose the ignorance of the faculty" on the blackboard as a punishment for exposing the ignorance of the teachers by removing the Teachers' Editions. In his book The Small Screen: How Television Equips Us to Live in the Information Age, Brian L. Ott describes this scene as one of the "key ways The Simpsons appeals to audience, which tends to be younger, by critiquing authority figures, and in particular educators". Toby Daspit and John Weaver write in their book Popular Culture and Critical Pedagogy: Reading, Constructing, Connecting that the writers of The Simpsons are "particularly interested" in questions about authority and the abuses of powers in school. Another scene from the episode sees Ms. Hoover telling the students to stare at the blackboard for fifteen minutes until class is over. Daspit and Weaver write that it is "the absolute power that teachers have over students' every action that allows for the image to be presented on The Simpsons. It would be comforting to tell ourselves that this is simply parody run amok, that the writers are stretching reality to make a point, but the discussants in the study [of The Simpsons in this book] had memories of a reality very much like the one presented in this program." One of the discussants said she believes everyone has experienced similar situations in their school years, and she thinks the thought that "an educator could ever do something so useless and pointless with the children's time" is "frightening".

== Reception ==
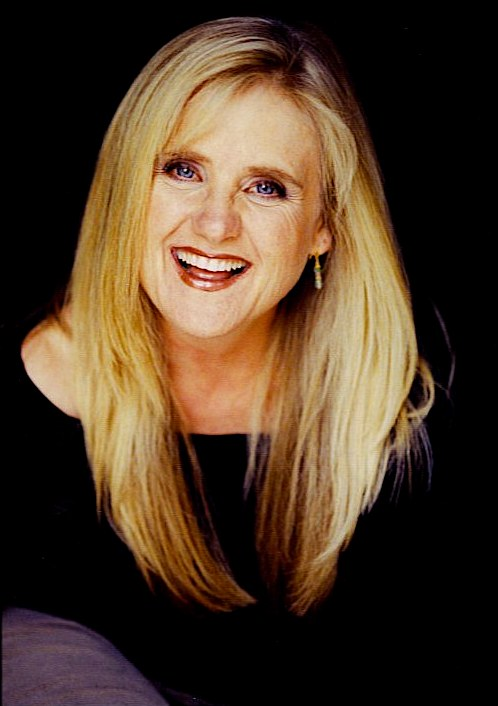
Nancy Cartwright won an Emmy for her performance as Bart.

In its original American broadcast, "Separate Vocations" finished 29th in the ratings for the week of February 24–March 1, 1992, with a Nielsen Rating of 14.8, equivalent to approximately 13.6 million viewing households. It was the highest-rated show on Fox that week. Nancy Cartwright won an Emmy for her outstanding performance as Bart.

Since airing, the episode has received mostly positive reviews from television critics. The authors of the book I Can't Believe It's a Bigger and Better Updated Unofficial Simpsons Guide, Gary Russell and Gareth Roberts, thought the episode displayed The Simpsons "at its best – not only hilarious but daringly outspoken on a whole range of issues – the failures of the education system, police abuses of power, the stifling of children's creativity".

Bill Gibron of DVD Verdict said "Separate Vocations" represents The Simpsons "at its apex as a well tuned talent machine grinding out the good stuff with surprising accuracy and skill". Gibron added that the episode shows that "even in territory they're not used to (Bart as a safety patrol, Lisa as a cursing class cut up), the Simpsons' kids are funny and inventive".

Nate Meyers of Digitally Obsessed rated the episode a four (out of five) and commented that the script's "departure from the traditional roles assigned to Bart and Lisa makes for a fresh experience with many laughs". Meyers thought the highlight of the episode was Bart's ride in the police car. DVD Movie Guide's Colin Jacobson thought the theme of the episode was unoriginal, but commented that Bart's "rapid embrace of fascism" and Lisa's "descent into hooliganism" provide "a number of funny opportunities, and 'Separate Vocations' exploits them well. Though it's not one of the year's best shows, it seems like a good one for the most part."
