= Dog of Death =

- The Simpsons episode
- Episode no.: Season 3 Episode 19
- Directed by: Jim Reardon
- Written by: John Swartzwelder
- Production code: 8F17
- Original air date: March 12, 1992

Guest appearance
- Frank Welker as Santa's Little Helper

Episode features
- Chalkboard gag: "I saw nothing unusual in the teacher's lounge"
- Couch gag: Homer gets to the couch first and lies down. The rest of the family arrives and sits on him. Homer flails his arms.
- Commentary: Matt Groening; Al Jean; Jim Reardon

Episode chronology
← Previous "Separate Vocations"	Next → "Colonel Homer"
- The Simpsons season 3

"Dog of Death" is the nineteenth episode of the third season of the American animated television series The Simpsons. It originally aired on Fox in the United States on March 12, 1992.

The episode was written by John Swartzwelder and directed by Jim Reardon. The writers enjoyed the previous episodes centered on Santa's Little Helper and decided to create another one, which resulted in "Dog of Death".

Since airing, the episode has received positive reviews from television critics. It acquired a Nielsen rating of 14.2 and was the highest-rated show on Fox the week it aired.

== Plot ==
The Simpson family rushes Santa's Little Helper to the animal hospital, where they learn that he has a twisted stomach and needs a $750 operation. Homer tells Bart and Lisa that the family cannot afford the operation, but after seeing how much they love the dog, decides he will find a way to pay for it.

To save money for the operation, the Simpsons must make sacrifices: Homer stops buying beer and Bart gets his hair cut at a barber school. Marge must cook with lower-quality food and forgo her weekly lottery ticket. Lisa can no longer afford volumes of Encyclopedia Generica, and Maggie's tattered clothes must be repaired instead of replaced. The family saves enough money for the operation, which is a success.

The Simpsons are glad that their dog survives, but soon they start to feel the strain of their sacrifices. The family's morale suffers, and they direct their anger at Santa's Little Helper. Feeling unwanted, he runs away from home on an adventure, only to be captured, taken to the dog pound and adopted by Mr. Burns, who trains him to be one of his vicious attack hounds. After a brutal brainwashing process, Santa's Little Helper is turned into a bloodthirsty killer.

The family regret their hatred against Santa's Little Helper, and Bart goes from house to house asking if anyone has seen him. When Bart arrives at Mr. Burns' mansion, Santa's Little Helper starts to attack him. After recalling all the good times he had with Bart, Santa's Little Helper reverts to his friendly nature toward him. He protects Bart from Mr. Burns's pack of snarling hounds and returns to the Simpson family, who shower him with love as apologies for their foolishness.

== Production ==
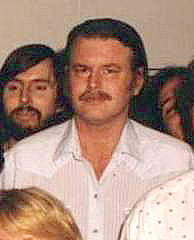
The episode was based on an experience that writer John Swartzwelder had with his own dog.

"Dog of Death" was written by long-time writer John Swartzwelder and directed by Jim Reardon. The producers decided to create another episode centered on Santa's Little Helper, as they enjoyed the previous ones, particularly season one's "Simpsons Roasting on an Open Fire", in which the Simpson family receives him. Reardon commented that one of the hardest feats with the episode was to make Santa's Little Helper not express any human expressions, as the staff preferred animals on the show to behave exactly the way they do in real life. The plot of "Dog of Death" was based on an experience Swartzwelder had with his own dog. The Gold Coast Bulletin's Ryan Ellem commented that the Simpson family's dilemma with the cost of the veterinary procedure is a "very real" dilemma which many families "who normally don't budget for a pooch's bung knee" face.

== Cultural references ==
The scene in which Mr. Burns brainwashes Santa's Little Helper with the Ludovico technique is a parody of Stanley Kubrick's A Clockwork Orange (1971): Santa's Little Helper's eyes are held open while he is forced to watch a film with footage that would aggravate a dog: a dog being hit with a rolled-up newspaper, a shoe kicking a water dish, a kitten playing with a ball of string, a tank running over a doghouse, a dog being hit on the head by a falling toilet seat, and finally Lyndon B. Johnson holding his dog up in the air by the ears. Ludwig van Beethoven's ninth symphony is heard during the sequence. In another scene, Lassie is referenced when Santa's Little Helper rescues a child from a burning building. Homer claims that Santa's Little Helper will be going to Doggie Heaven, while Richard Nixon's dog Checkers and Adolf Hitler's dog Blondi will be going to Doggie Hell. The doctor who performs the surgery on Santa's Little Helper is based on Vince Edwards's character from Ben Casey. The episode also parodies lottery advertisements. In one commercial featured in the episode, an announcement states: "The state lottery, where everybody wins," while a tiny disclaimer at the bottom of the screen can be seen saying: "Actual odds of winning, one in 380,000,000". Santa's Little Helper's adventure resembles The Incredible Journey (1963). Sergei Prokofiev's Peter and the Wolf is heard in the sequence.

Kent Brockman announces that people hoping to get tips on how to win the lottery have checked out every available copy of Shirley Jackson's "The Lottery" at the Springfield Public Library. Among them is Homer, who throws the book into the fireplace after Kent reveals that "Of course, the book does not contain any hints on how to win the lottery. It is, rather, a chilling tale of conformity gone mad." In her book Shirley Jackson: Essays on the Literary Legacy, Bernice Murphy comments that this scene displays some of the most contradictory things about Jackson: "It says a lot about the visibility of Jackson's most notorious tale that more than 50 years after its initial creation it is still famous enough to warrant a mention in the world's most famous sitcom. The fact that Springfield's citizenry also miss the point of Jackson's story completely [...] can perhaps be seen as an indication of a more general misrepresentation of Jackson and her work." In addition to "The Lottery", the books that end up in the Simpsons' fireplace are Fahrenheit 451 by Ray Bradbury, Fatherhood by Bill Cosby and Canine Surgery. Fatherhood was heavily referenced in "Saturdays of Thunder" earlier in the season.

It contains several references to past episodes of The Simpsons. Santa's Little Helper gets picked up by a car on "Michael Jackson Expressway", a reference to the season premiere "Stark Raving Dad", where Mayor Quimby had the expressway renamed in honor of an expected visit by Michael Jackson. It references several controversies about Jackson; Brockman's butler tells him that his pet llama bit Ted Kennedy and Mr. Burns is sleeping in a hyperbaric chamber as part of his longevity treatment. At the Burns Mansion, Ned Flanders is seen wearing his "Assassin" running shoes from "Bart's Dog Gets an 'F'". The flyer Homer replaces with the "lost dog" notice is Principal Skinner's "Have you seen my body?" flyer from "Bart the Murderer". This episode has the first time someone other than Homer says "D'oh!" – Lisa, when she is assigned to do a report on Nicolaus Copernicus and realizes she does not have any reference books, utters the phrase. On Santa's Little Helper's travels, he visits Swartzwelder County, a reference to the episode's writer, John Swartzwelder.

== Reception ==
"Dog of Death" first aired on Fox in the United States on March 12, 1992. The episode finished 19th in the ratings that week, and beat its main competitor, The Cosby Show (NBC), which finished 28th. "Dog of Death" acquired a Nielsen rating of 14.2, equivalent to about 13.1 million viewing households, which made The Simpsons the highest-rated show on Fox the week the episode aired.

Since airing, "Dog of Death" has received positive reviews from television critics. Tom Adair of The Scotsman considers it to be a classic episode of the show, and Mark Zlotnick of UGO's DVDFanatic named it one of his personal favorites from season three. The episode's reference to A Clockwork Orange was named the 10th-greatest film reference in the history of the show by Total Film's Nathan Ditum. Nate Meyers of Digitally Obsessed rated "Dog of Death" a 3 (of 5) and commented that people who like dogs will enjoy the episode, in part because of Mr. Burns' attack-dog training program, which Meyers called a "brilliant reference to A Clockwork Orange". He added that the episode is unlikely to satisfy devoted fans, and the relationship between the family and Santa's Little Helper will not "register" to casual viewers; "Still, there are enough laughs (especially in the animal hospital) to keep the audience entertained."

DVD Movie Guide's Colin Jacobson also praised the parody of A Clockwork Orange, describing it as "possibly the funniest Clockwork Orange parody I've ever seen". Jacobson added that the episode as a whole offers "a terrific program. [...] From the cracks about the lottery and public hysteria that open the program to the calamities that befall the family when Santa's Little Helper gets sick to the bizarre escapades that greet the pooch when he splits, 'Dog of Death' provides a hilarious piece."

The authors of the book I Can't Believe It's a Bigger and Better Updated Unofficial Simpsons Guide, Gary Russell and Gareth Roberts, praised several scenes from the episode, including Homer's dream of winning the lottery, Mr. Burns' brainwashing of Santa's Little Helper, and the closing line of the episode that "No dogs were harmed in the filming of this episode. A cat got sick, and someone shot a duck. But that's it."

Bill Gibron of DVD Verdict commented that Santa's Little Helper's "twisted stomach means the family must budget themselves to pay for the surgery, and the results are some of the best lines in the history of the show. From 'lousy chub night' to 'mmmm, snouts,' the hard knock life seems to enliven Homer into one sarcastic bastard." In 2007, Mikey Cahill of the Herald Sun named this episode's chalkboard gag, "I saw nothing unusual in the teacher's lounge", the third-best chalkboard gag in the show's history.

Nathan Rabin of The A.V. Club writes "The lottery subplot turns out to be something of a dead end, for as the title suggests, the real subject of 'The Dog of Death' is the furry, adorable little sentient plot point that is Santa’s Little Helper." He praises the references to Clockwork Orange and "The Lottery" and notes his favorite joke in the episode: "Homer fantasizes that winning the lottery will allow him to become a giant, fourteen-karat gold Man-God who towers over his flesh-colored subjects like a colossus. There’s no real rhyme or reason to Homer’s desires; there are no practical benefits to having gold skin as there would be to possessing say, laser-beam eyes, it’s just the crassest conceivable form of consumerism, greed rendered surreal. On the commentary, the writers and producer herald it as the ultimate John Swartzwelder gag, an insane non sequitur that takes an ugly human impulse and exaggerates it to grotesque extremes. All hail King Homer indeed."
