= Colonel Homer =

- The Simpsons episode
- Lurleen Lumpkin tries to seduce Homer, whose attire is similar to that worn by Elvis Presley's manager Colonel Tom Parker. Lurleen's mobile home was given a confined design to make the scene more intimate and romantic.
- Episode no.: Season 3 Episode 20
- Directed by: Mark Kirkland
- Written by: Matt Groening
- Production code: 8F19
- Original air date: March 26, 1992

Guest appearance
- Beverly D'Angelo as Lurleen Lumpkin

Episode features
- Chalkboard gag: "I will not conduct my own fire drills"
- Couch gag: Everyone sits on the couch and falls in with their upward pointing legs next to their heads.
- Commentary: Matt Groening; Al Jean; Mike Reiss; Dan Castellaneta; Mark Kirkland

Episode chronology
← Previous "Dog of Death"	Next → "Black Widower"
- The Simpsons season 3

"Colonel Homer" is the twentieth episode of the third season of the American animated television series The Simpsons. It originally aired on Fox in the United States on March 26, 1992. In the episode, Homer and Marge quarrel after he embarrasses her at a movie theater. Later Homer visits a redneck bar, where he discovers Lurleen Lumpkin, a talented singer-songwriter, waiting tables. Homer becomes her manager, unaware she has fallen in love with him. When Marge grows upset because she suspects Homer is cheating on her, he must remain faithful to her after Lurleen makes romantic advances toward him.

The episode was written by series creator Matt Groening, and directed by Mark Kirkland; it is the only episode of the series for which Groening received an individual writing credit. Actress and singer Beverly D'Angelo guest starred in the episode as Lurleen. Although the character makes several cameos after this episode, Lurleen makes her second full-time appearance sixteen years later in "Papa Don't Leech". The episode features cultural references to songs such as "Funkytown" by Lipps Inc. and "There's a Kind of Hush (All Over the World)" by Herman's Hermits, and the films Deliverance, Look Who's Talking and Honey, I Shrunk the Kids.

Since airing, "Colonel Homer" has received mostly positive reviews from television critics. It attained a Nielsen rating of 14.8, and was the highest-rated show on Fox the week it aired. The episode was selected for inclusion in a video collection of selected episodes, titled The Last Temptation of Homer, which was released on November 9, 1998. An action figure set based on "Colonel Homer" was released in March 2002, and two of Lurleen's songs from the episode appeared on the Simpsons compilation album Songs in the Key of Springfield.

== Plot ==
The Simpsons visit the local multiplex. After Homer makes distracting sounds and loudly reveals the film's ending to the audience, Marge berates him and the other patrons heckle and pelt him with refreshments. Marge tries to apologize on the way home, but Homer, blaming her for robbing him of his dignity, drops her and the children at home and drives into the night.

Homer stops at a redneck bar, where an attractive waitress and singer-songwriter named Lurleen performs country songs on stage. Her song "Your Wife Don't Understand You" resonates with Homer; he drives to her mobile home several days later to beg a copy. When Lurleen reveals she has not recorded the song, Homer persuades her to join him at a recording booth, after which they are approached by a representative for a local country station. Lurleen's songs are instant hits.

Marge disapproves of Homer seeing Lurleen because she fears they will form a romantic relationship. Her fears increase after Homer becomes Lurleen's manager, and she buys him an expensive white cowboy suit, which he wears at home. Homer denies having an affair with Lurleen, but insists he will manage her career, with or without Marge's approval. Marge becomes angry when Homer gambles his whole family's future by using the life savings to pay for a recording studio for Lurleen, and her new single, a suggestive love song called "Bagged Me a Homer", angers her further.

Homer gets Lurleen a gig on the country western television show Ya-Hoo! The night before the show in Lurleen's home, she sings a new song to Homer, "Bunk With Me Tonight", adding it has a "secret message"; he belatedly realizes that she is trying to seduce him. Rather than violate his marital vows, he leaves.

During Lurleen's performance, Homer is approached by a business agent who asks to buy Lurleen's contract, but he refuses. When Homer becomes locked in an embrace with Lurleen in her dressing room, his love life flashes before his eyes, and he remembers Marge saying she will always love him. Homer tells Lurleen that he only wanted to share her voice with the world, and leaves to avoid committing adultery. He sees the agent again outside the dressing room and sells him Lurleen's contract for $50.

Marge is watching Ya-Hoo! in bed when Homer returns. Lurleen's new song "Stand By Your Manager" reveals what Homer did – and did not – do with her; expressing her hopes that Marge knows how lucky she is to still have Homer as a loyal husband. Marge forgives Homer and they kiss passionately.

== Production ==
=== Writing and directing ===
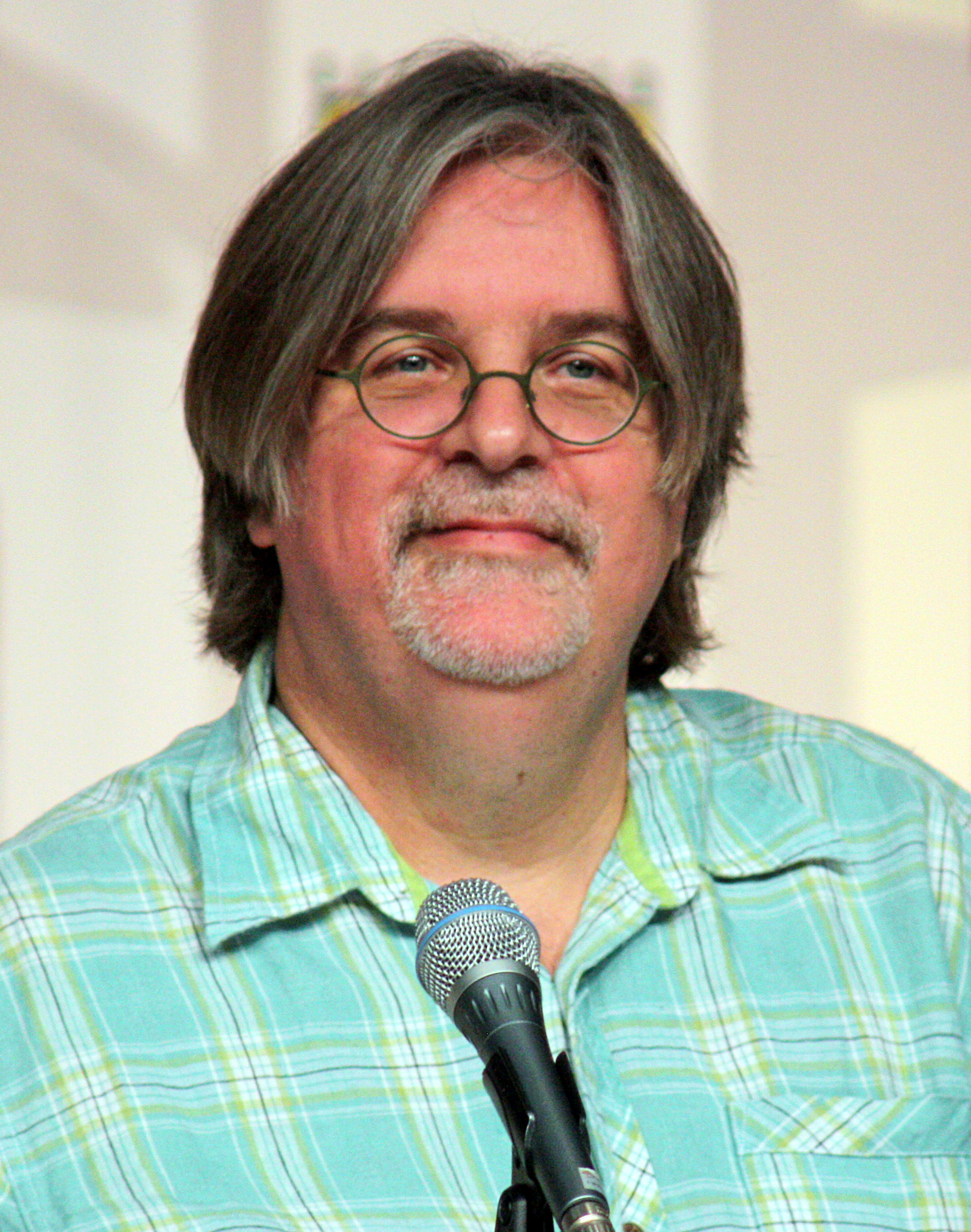
"Colonel Homer" was written by series creator Matt Groening, the first (and only) episode he wrote on his own.

The episode was written by series creator Matt Groening, the only episode (discounting the Tracey Ullman shorts) for which he received an individual writing credit, though he has co-written for the episodes "Some Enchanted Evening", "The Telltale Head", and "22 Short Films About Springfield". "Colonel Homer" was partly based on Coal Miner's Daughter (1980), which tells the story of country singer Loretta Lynn. Groening said he had always wanted to write an episode in which Homer is offered a chance between being rich and famous and being with his family, and chooses his family in the end. He pitched the idea to the writers of the show, who suggested the parody of Coal Miner's Daughter and that Homer should become a manager of a country singer.

Showrunner Mike Reiss was originally skeptical about the episode, as he did not think Homer could get a new job when he already had a full-time job at the Springfield Nuclear Power Plant. Reiss eventually gave in, but in future episodes the writers tried to develop the explanation that he got fired from the plant and then rehired at the end. Groening said that during the episode production, he received comments from the production team that Homer was acting like a "jerk" in it, but his explanation was that Homer's behavior was due to his desire to make Lurleen a star and he was oblivious to her attempts to seduce him until the end.

Mark Kirkland, said he enjoyed directing the episode because the characters' emotions throughout it are "very human and real". He believed many viewers watching the episode would recognize the emotions from experiences in their own lives, and would feel sympathy for the characters. The idea of Homer annoying the people at the movie theater was based on an experience Groening had with a friend of his when he was younger. They were sitting by themselves in a movie theater and two "annoying" women sat down right in front of them. Groening's friend told the women to move and they did. One of the women then turned to Groening and his friend and said, "Now are you satisfied?", to which Groening's friend replied: "I won't be satisfied until I see you burn in hell."

=== Voice acting and music ===
American singer and actress Beverly D'Angelo guest starred in the episode as Lurleen Lumpkin. The actress first met Groening at a party at Frank Zappa's house, and was called in to audition for Lurleen based on her performance as Patsy Cline in Coal Miner's Daughter. She got the role after completing a singing test. D'Angelo wrote two songs for the episode: "Your Wife Don't Understand You" (which Lurleen sings at the Beer 'N' Brawl where Homer hears her for the first time) and "Bagged Me a Homer". D'Angelo wrote both songs in an hour and presented them to Groening at the episode's table read. Unlike most other guest stars on The Simpsons who record their lines and then leave to accommodate their schedule, D'Angelo stayed with the production team all day and pitched several jokes for the episode. Entertainment Weekly named D'Angelo's performance as Lurleen one of the sixteen best guest appearances on The Simpsons. Tom Nawrocki of Rolling Stone rated the songs D'Angelo wrote as two of the best songs in the history of the show.

=== Animation ===
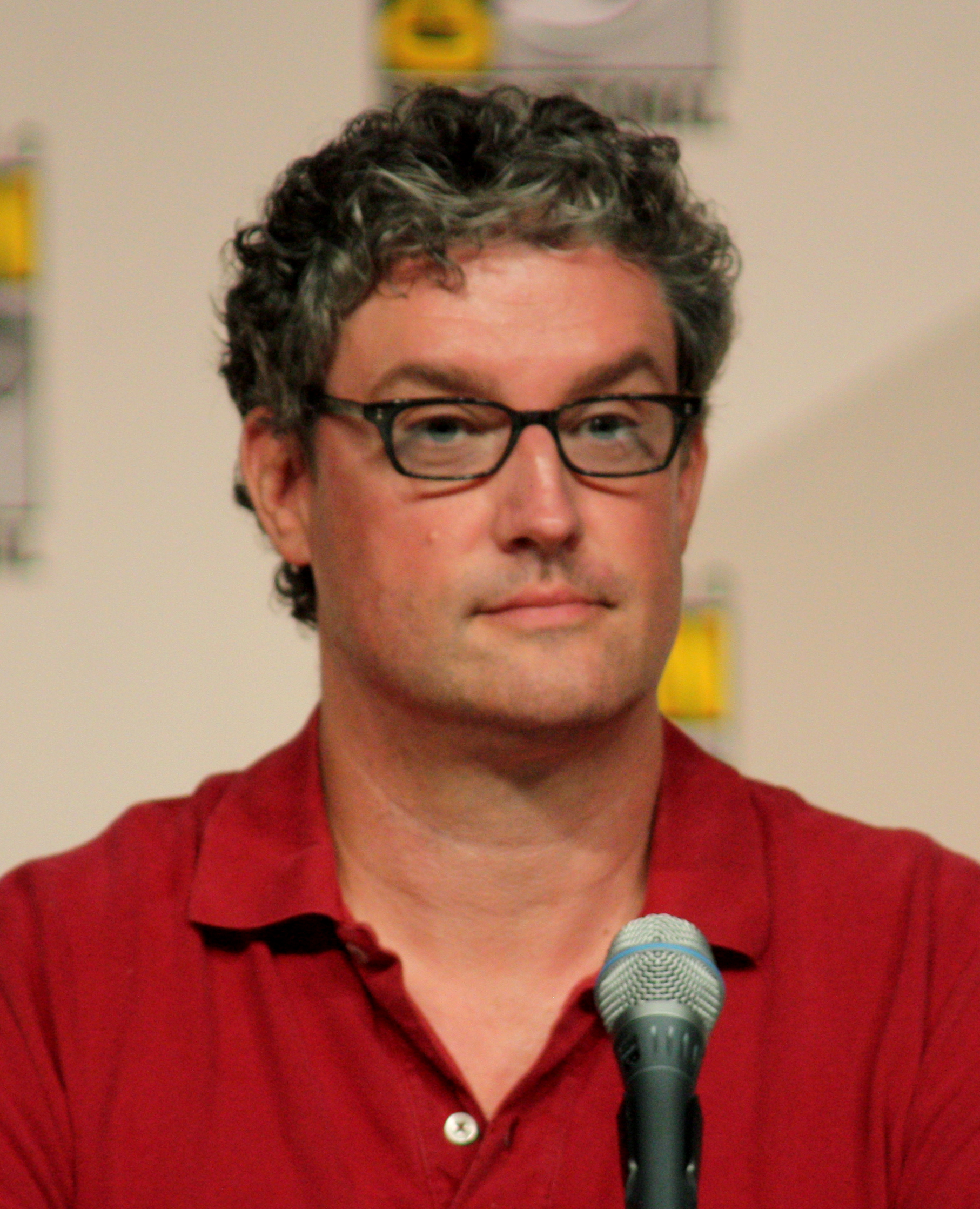
Showrunner Al Jean says it is difficult to design real people with a "Simpson look", especially women.

The episode marks the debut appearance of Lurleen on The Simpsons. She was created by one of the show's character designers, John Rice. Kirkland thought the first design Rice drew of Lurleen was too "bland" and "plain", so they decided to model her after D'Angelo and add "every kind of pretty girl cliché" into the design. Rice and Kirkland then sent the character to Groening, who sent back a note saying "wow". Reiss's showrunner partner Al Jean said that "one of the most difficult things when translating real people to a Simpsons look is for women to look beautiful", as the Simpson overbite and facial construction make it particularly difficult to design women's looks. Lurleen's last name, Lumpkin, came from the country bumpkin character Tony Lumpkin in the 1773 comedy play She Stoops to Conquer by Oliver Goldsmith.

Bart's voice actor, Nancy Cartwright, wrote in her autobiography My Life as a 10-Year-Old Boy that the episode's script gives the audience a "visual and aural feast". She said the background designers "must have gone on another field trip for this one" because they captured the look of a typical musical recording studio. The recording studio in the episode, where Lurleen records her new songs with the Simpson family, features two rooms, one for the artist and one for the engineer, with a pane of glass between them. Cartwright said the designers added their own "special touch" by putting a few cracks on the walls, designing a slightly dilapidated ceiling, and by making it look as if the soundproofing on the walls are falling off. The property designers went on a field trip to Sun Studio to receive inspiration for the props in the recording studio, such as the "in session" red light, the mixing board, the musical instruments, and the volume-unit meters which indicate how loud the artist is singing. For the interior design of the recording studio, the color designers mixed colors such as orange, mauve, gray, and brown to make them complement each other. The colors in the engineer's booth were darker to make Homer's white suit stand out from the background. The appearance of the engineer at the recording studio was based on John Boylan, an American music producer who produced the highly successful album The Simpsons Sing the Blues. Lurleen's mobile home was designed to be "very confined" and "tiny" so that the compositions of Homer and Lurleen would be tighter, thus giving the scene an intimate, romantic feeling.

== Cultural references ==
The episode's title and Homer's attire are references to Colonel Tom Parker, Elvis Presley's manager. Films playing at the Springfield Googolplex at the beginning of the episode include Honey, I Hit a School Bus (a riff on Honey, I Shrunk the Kids), Look Who's Oinking (a parody of Look Who's Talking), and Ernest Cuts the Cheese, starring the fictional character Ernest P. Worrell. En route to Lurleen's trailer park, Homer passes a boy playing a banjo on a porch, a reference to the "Dueling Banjos" sequence in Deliverance (1972). He appears later at the recording studio waiting in line with his banjo. William Irwin writes in his book Philosophy and the Interpretation of Pop Culture that this "burst of banjo" must convey a message even if the viewers do not "get" the reference to Deliverance: "Thanks to prevailing connotations of banjo music, viewers who do not recognize the banjo tune as the theme from Deliverance will not laugh, but the mere sound of banjo tells the audience that Homer has entered a backward, redneck area."

The Beer 'N' Brawl is based on the bar in the film Urban Cowboy (1980). The Beer 'N' Brawl sells Laramie High Tar cigarettes. After arriving home from the Beer 'N' Brawl, Lurleen's song is stuck in Homer's head, and he even sings it to his bowling ball for good luck. Homer's co-worker Lenny decides to give it a shot and sings "There's a Kind of Hush (All Over the World)" to his bowling ball. Homer says that the last song before Lurleen's "Your Wife Don't Understand You" that he could not get out of his mind was the Lipps Inc song "Funkytown". The syndicated country comedy show that Lurleen appears on, Ya-Hoo!, is based on the country television series Hee Haw.

== Reception ==
=== Ratings and critical reviews ===
In its original broadcast, "Colonel Homer" finished 22nd in the ratings for the week of March 23–29, 1992, with a Nielsen rating of 14.8, equivalent to approximately 16.63 million viewing households. It was the highest-rated show on Fox that week.

Since airing, the episode has received mostly positive reviews from television critics. Nate Meyers of Digitally Obsessed rated the episode a 5 (of 5) and called it "another great" episode that chronicles the love between Homer and Marge, showing the "ups and downs" of their marriage. He said Lurleen's songs are "filled with clever observations", but it is Homer's befuddlement that makes it a "classic" episode. Meyers added, however, that country music fans might "take offense at Matt Groening's script, which hams up every stereotype imaginable". DVD Movie Guide's Colin Jacobson said that after the "great" previous episode "Dog of Death", "one might expect some drop-off with 'Colonel Homer', but virtually none occurs. It offers another classic episode that benefits from a memorable guest voice performance from D'Angelo. Homer's moment in the sun creates a fun plot and the program nicely lampoons the country music business."

The authors of the book I Can't Believe It's a Bigger and Better Updated Unofficial Simpsons Guide, Gary Russell and Gareth Roberts, said the episode is a "good example of The Simpsons fixing itself on a target (in this case, country and western music) and extracting every possible gag. Lurleen's songs are all marvelous." Hock Guan Teh of DVD Town said he enjoyed the episode, and although it does not contain the "usual amount" of The Simpsons humor, the "rich character development itself makes this episode worth multiple viewings. However, anyone allergic to country music should give this one a pass!"

Bill Gibron of DVD Verdict thought the episode featured "one of the best" parodies the Simpsons writers have ever conceived, the parody of the country television series Hee-Haw called Ya-Hoo!: "While one must give multiple kudos to Beverly D'Angelo for writing and performing her own witty hillbilly ditties, it's the twisted cornpone [television series Ya-Hoo!], with such stars as Big Shirtless Ron and Gappy Mae, that really propels this installment into comic heaven. Homer's sheepish response to Lurlene's advances shows just what a decent, family loving man he is." A reviewer for the Fort Worth Star-Telegram called the episode "heartwarming", and commented that The Simpsons "once again shows that at the heart of this crazy family there is an abiding love".

Genevieve Koski of The A.V. Club said "it's a pretty impossible question for a die-hard fan, but if I were forced at gunpoint to name my favorite episode ever, 'Colonel Homer' would probably be the first to leap to mind, if only for the pure joy that is 'Bagged Me a Homer'." Nathan Rabin wrote "As you might imagine, the writers, particularly credited scribe Matt Groening, have a lot of fun at the expense of good honest god-fearing country folk, whether Lurleen is rattling off the titles of some of her songs (you most assuredly do not know her from such unrecorded ditties as 'Don’t Look Down My Dress Unless You Mean It', 'I’m Basting a Turkey With My Tears' and 'I’m Sick of Your Lying Lips and False Teeth') or the writers are taxing their vivid imaginations thinking up an endless series of hillbilly-tastic players for a Hee Haw-style show that features Lurleen in her national television debut. But if the show is predictably irreverent in its treatment of country music and especially the culture around it, it’s also refreshingly respectful towards country’s power to move people and stir people. Lurlene’s other-woman anthem 'Your Wife Don’t Understand You' may be a parody but it also works as a straight-up country song, as do the other songs in the episode... In its own strange way, 'Colonel Homer' respects the traditions and themes of country. Like the best country music, it’s all about love, marriage, fidelity, temptation and making the right choice between good and evil. It’s funny as hell while containing more than a little heartache."

=== Lurleen's legacy ===
Lurleen has made several cameo appearances on the show after this episode. She appears for her second time in the season four episode "Marge vs. the Monorail", voiced by Doris Grau, as she is briefly interviewed by Kent Brockman during the monorail's maiden voyage party. When he asks her what she has been doing lately, she responds that she "spent last night in a ditch". She looks dishevelled, and speaks with the same harsh, croaky, gravelly voice that Grau provides for lunchlady Doris, rather than the soft, Southern accent she had when she was first introduced. Lurleen also has a cameo in the season four episode "Krusty Gets Kancelled" as the center square on The Springfield Squares, and appears in "Team Homer" as a member of the bowling team "The Home Wreckers". In the season seven episode "Bart on the Road", Lurleen's name can be seen briefly on a banner saying "playing tonight" in Branson, Missouri. She made her second full-time appearance in the season nineteen episode "Papa Don't Leech", in which the Simpsons family takes Lurleen into their home after she becomes a fugitive from the Springfield authorities for not paying her taxes.

== Merchandise ==
"Colonel Homer" originally aired on Fox in the United States on March 26, 1992. The episode was selected for release in a video collection of selected episodes, titled The Last Temptation Of Homer, which was released on November 9, 1998. Other episodes included in the set were "One Fish, Two Fish, Blowfish, Blue Fish", "Homer Alone", and "Simpson and Delilah". The episode was later included on The Simpsons season three DVD set which was released on August 26, 2003. Matt Groening, Mark Kirkland, cast member Dan Castellaneta, and showrunners Al Jean and Mike Reiss participated in the DVD's audio commentary of the episode. "Colonel Homer" was again included in the 2005 DVD release of the Last Temptation Of Homer set. An action figure set based on the episode was released exclusively to Toys "R" Us stores in March 2002. The set, featuring Homer in his white suit and Lurleen with her guitar, is part of the World of Springfield series of The Simpsons action figures created by Playmate Toys. Lurleen's songs "Your Wife Don't Understand You" and "Bagged Me a Homer" appeared on the Simpsons compilation album Songs in the Key of Springfield, which was released on March 18, 1997.
