= Lisa the Greek =

- The Simpsons episode
- Episode no.: Season 3 Episode 14
- Directed by: Rich Moore
- Written by: Jay Kogen; Wallace Wolodarsky
- Production code: 8F12
- Original air date: January 23, 1992

Guest appearances
- Phil Hartman as Smooth Jimmy Apollo and Troy McClure

Episode features
- Couch gag: Homer accidentally sits on Santa's Little Helper.
- Commentary: Matt Groening; James L. Brooks; Al Jean; Mike Reiss; Julie Kavner; Nancy Cartwright; Yeardley Smith; Jay Kogen; Wallace Wolodarsky; Rich Moore

Episode chronology
| ← Previous "Radio Bart" | Next → "Homer Alone" |
- The Simpsons season 3

"Lisa the Greek" is the fourteenth episode of the third season of the American animated television series The Simpsons. It originally aired on Fox in the United States on January 23, 1992. In the episode, Homer bonds with Lisa when he discovers her ability to pick winning football teams. When Lisa learns her father is only using her talent to help him gamble, she thinks he does not care for her.

The episode was written by Jay Kogen and Wallace Wolodarsky, and directed by Rich Moore. The episode was written to satirize the Simpsons staff members' "love affair with gambling, particularly on football". "Lisa the Greek" references both the Super Bowl and the National Football League (NFL). It aired only days before Super Bowl XXVI, and correctly predicted that the Washington Redskins would win.

Since airing, the episode has received mostly positive reviews from television critics. It acquired a Nielsen rating of 14.2, and was the highest-rated show on Fox the week it aired.

== Plot ==
When Lisa complains to Marge that Homer does not share her interests, Marge suggests doing something he likes, so Lisa watches a televised football game with him. After being cheated by a premium rate betting advice hotline, a desperate Homer asks Lisa to pick a winner. She picks the Miami Dolphins, so Homer calls Moe's Tavern to place a $50 bet. Homer and Lisa celebrate the Dolphins' victory.

Meanwhile, Marge arranges a Mother-Son Day with Bart by taking him clothes shopping. She forces him to try on unfashionable clothes and humiliates him by flinging open the fitting room door, causing Sherri and Terri and the other customers to laugh at him in his underwear. Bart spends the rest of the day locked in the car to avoid getting beaten up by bullies for Marge’s poor fashion choices while Marge herself remains oblivious.

Since Lisa is adept at picking winning teams, Homer declares every Sunday during football season Daddy-Daughter Day. Lisa sustains her winning streak for eight weeks, earning Homer more money as the Super Bowl approaches. Homer buys his family expensive gifts and meals with his gambling earnings. When Lisa asks Homer if they can go hiking the Sunday after the Super Bowl, he tells her that Daddy-Daughter Days are over until next football season. Lisa realizes that Homer only wanted her to help him gamble and does not treasure her company.

After a nightmare in which her childhood sports betting with Homer caused her to grow up to become a compulsive gambler, Lisa, feeling unappreciated and betrayed, gives away all the toys Homer bought her with his betting stash. She decides to tell Homer who will win the game, but she warns him that she is so distraught she might unconsciously want him to lose. She makes a cryptic prediction: if she still loves him, Washington will win; if she does not, then Buffalo will. As Homer anxiously watches the game at Moe's, Washington scores at the last second and wins. Overjoyed that Lisa still loves him, Homer cancels his bowling date with Barney and goes hiking with Lisa the next weekend.

== Production ==
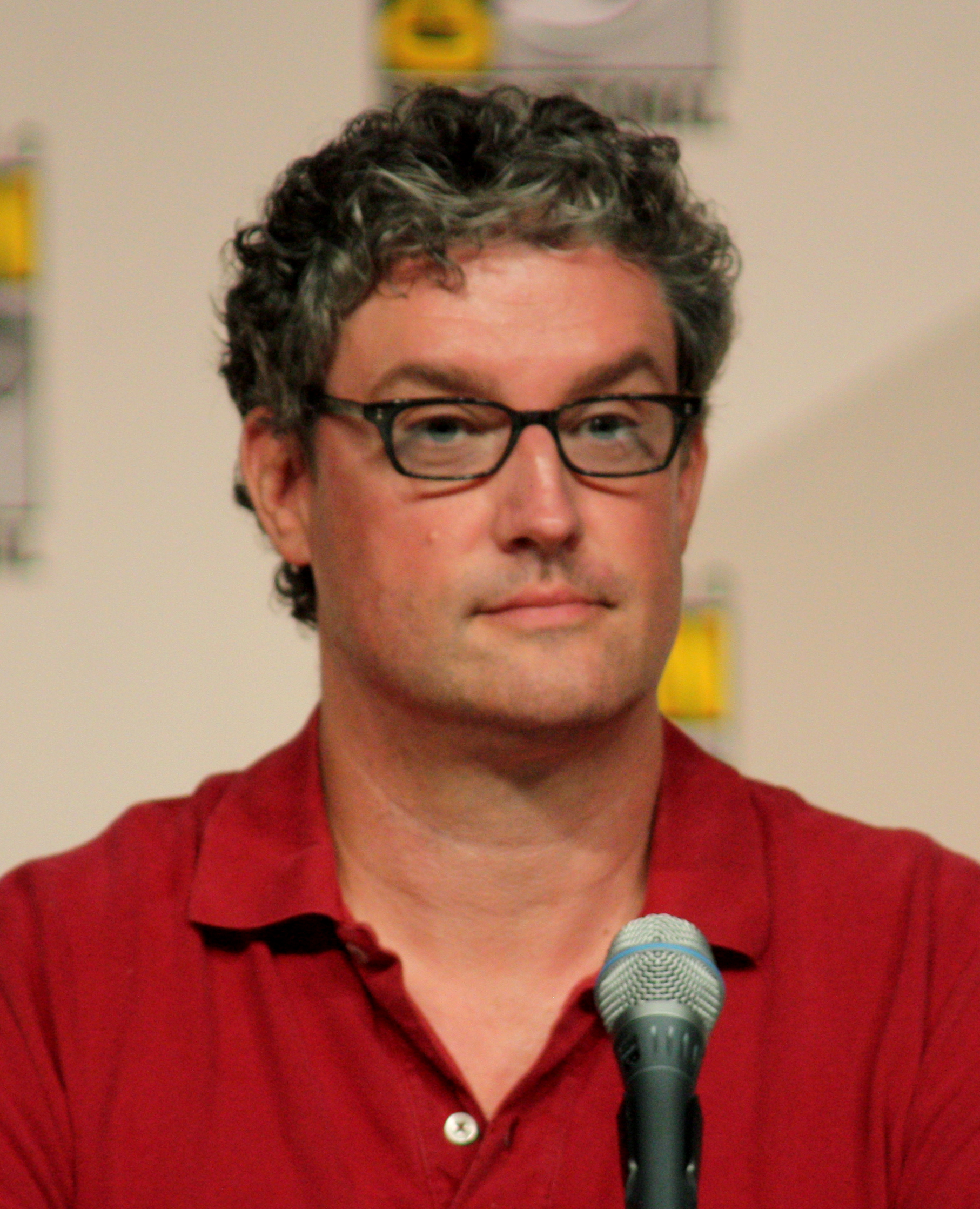
Al Jean enjoys working on Homer–Lisa episodes.

The episode was written by Jay Kogen and Wallace Wolodarsky, and directed by Rich Moore. According to showrunner Al Jean, it was designed to satirize the staff members' "love affair with gambling, particularly on football". Kogen, Wolodarsky, Jean, George Meyer, Sam Simon, and James L. Brooks were all frequent gamblers. Many of the staff members were also football fans, particularly Kogen and Wolodarsky. In "Lisa the Greek", the writers wanted to further develop Lisa's character, and so they decided to make it about Lisa's relationship with her father.

Kogen commented that Lisa and Marge episodes "tend to be the better episodes", because they are more thought-out and have more emotional depth. However, they are harder to write than other episodes because they are "less jokey". The writers therefore made the decision to replace Marge's role with Homer, who tends to be funnier than Marge. Jean commented that because he has a daughter, Homer–Lisa episodes are easier for him to write and he "always want[s] to work on them". Moore said they are his favorite episodes to direct, because "the two most opposite characters in the cast finding some kind of common ground [...] That was always interesting." In one scene, Homer makes Lisa sit on the end of the sofa so she will not interrupt the game. Yeardley Smith, the voice of Lisa, recalls that many people at the table-read thought Homer was "too harsh" in the scene, but it ended up being included in the episode anyway.

== Cultural references ==
"Lisa the Greek" references both the Super Bowl and the NFL. The episode aired just days before Super Bowl XXVI and correctly predicted that the Washington Redskins would defeat the Buffalo Bills. When a repeat of the episode re-aired the following year (only days before Super Bowl XXVII), the staff redubbed it to mention the Dallas Cowboys instead of Washington; the Cowboys won, making the episode accurate once again. It continued to be accurate through Super Bowl XXIX and Jean commented that he would always bet against Lisa's predictions, causing him to think "Why didn't I take Lisa's advice?" when he lost. As Lisa studies football at the Springfield library, she goes through the card catalog and finds an entry on Phyllis George, an American sportscaster. The title of the episode refers to the American bookie and sports commentator Jimmy "the Greek" Snyder. "Smooth" Jimmy Apollo is based on Snyder and Brent Gunsilman is based on Brent Musburger. The program on which Apollo and Gunsilman appear, Inside Football Today, is based on the CBS pregame show The NFL Today, which featured Musburger, George, and Snyder as co-hosts and panelists (Musburger from 1975-1990, George from 1975-1978 and again from 1980-1983, and Snyder from 1976-1988); the program's intro with a defensive player decapitating the ball carrier on a CGI gridiron is based on the intro for The NFL Today used between 1983 and 1988. The Duff Bowl commercial that airs during halftime is a reference to Bud Bowl ads for Budweiser.

In addition to the football references, the episode references Apocalypse Now (1979). Homer tells Moe, who keeps his wallet in his boot, "I used to hate the smell of your sweaty feet. Now it's the smell of victory," a play on Kilgore's line "I love the smell of napalm in the morning. It smells like victory." In a Super Bowl pregame interview about his new television show, celebrity Troy McClure says that he plays "Jack Handle, a retired cop who shares an apartment with a retired criminal. We're the original Odd Couple!", referencing the television show The Odd Couple. His new sitcom, Handle with Care (starring a retired cop who resides with a retired convict) is a sitcom patterned after the 1970s series Switch starring Eddie Albert and Robert Wagner, a detective series about an ex-police officer partnered with a reformed con artist. With his gambling winnings Homer buys Marge a bottle of perfume, Meryl Streep's Versatility. The bottle is shaped like an Academy Award.

== Reception ==
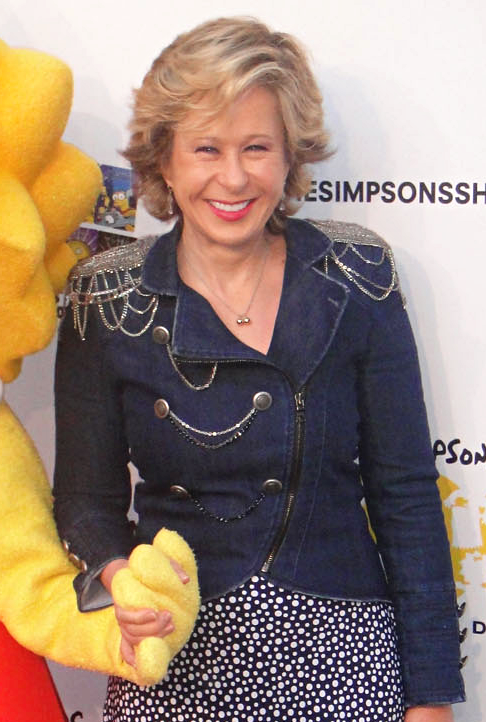
Yeardley Smith received a Primetime Emmy Award for her performance in the episode.

In its original American broadcast, "Lisa the Greek" finished 27th in the ratings for the week of January 18–24, 1992, with a Nielsen rating of 14.2, equivalent to approximately 13 million viewing households. It was the highest-rated show on Fox that week. Yeardley Smith, received a Primetime Emmy Award for Outstanding Voice-Over Performance in 1992 for her performance in the episode. "Lisa the Greek" is one of Dan Castellaneta's favorite episodes along with season two's "Lisa's Substitute".

Since airing, the episode has received mostly positive reviews from television critics. John Carman of the San Francisco Chronicle called it his favorite episode of the show. Gary Russell and Gareth Roberts, wrote that "it's nice to see [Homer] and Lisa getting along so well for once." Nate Meyers of Digitally Obsessed rated the episode a 5 (of 5) and commented that "any football fan will love this episode, but the reason why it is so good is the relationship between Homer and Lisa. The two truly are a father and daughter to one another, causing both laughter and touching emotion in the audience."

Bill Gibron of DVD Verdict said "Lisa the Greek" is "a chance for Homer and Lisa to bond under less than ideal, but always amusing, circumstances. Oddly, for a show relying on actual events like the Super Bowl to guide its plotline, it doesn't have [a] retread feeling. DVD Movie Guide's Colin Jacobson, however, did not think the episode developed Lisa's and Homer's relationship, but it "tosses in some good pokes at the NFL and the culture that surrounds the sport". Jacobson added that although the episode "echoes the neglectful father theme seen not long ago in 'Lisa's Pony', the show doesn't feel like just a retread. [...] It's not a classic, but it remains an above average program."

The San Jose Mercury News's Daniel Brown said NFL gambling "seems to be a crew-wide addiction, which is why 'Lisa the Greek' is filled with sophisticated gags about point spreads and bookies". The Pittsburgh Post-Gazette named it seventh best episode of the show with a sports theme.

The Globe and Mail's Liam Lacey noted the similarities between the episode and Imagine That (2009) in a review of the film. He said the "message in each case is about the dangerous confusion of love and money. Naturally there's a turning point [...] where the child begins to wonder whether her father really loves her or just her profitable talent."
