= Radio Bart =

- The Simpsons episode
- Episode no.: Season 3 Episode 13
- Directed by: Carlos Baeza
- Written by: Jon Vitti
- Production code: 8F11
- Original air date: January 9, 1992

Guest appearance
- Sting as himself

Episode features
- Chalkboard gag: "I will not carve gods"
- Couch gag: The family bounces up and down on the couch.
- Commentary: Matt Groening; Al Jean; Mike Reiss; Nancy Cartwright; Jon Vitti; David Silverman

Episode chronology
← Previous "I Married Marge"	Next → "Lisa the Greek"
- The Simpsons season 3

"Radio Bart" is the thirteenth episode of the third season of the American animated television series The Simpsons. It originally aired on Fox in the United States on January 9, 1992. In the episode, Bart receives a microphone that transmits sound to nearby AM radios. To play a prank on the citizens of Springfield, he lowers a radio down a well and uses the microphone to trick the town into thinking a little boy is trapped there. The prank succeeds, but Bart remembers labelling the radio with his name, tries to retrieve it, and becomes trapped himself. Angry at being duped by Bart, the townspeople refuse to rescue him.

The episode was written by Jon Vitti and directed by Carlos Baeza. Musician Sting guest starred in the episode as himself, though the producers originally approached Bruce Springsteen to appear. The episode features cultural references to charity singles such as "We Are the World". Since airing, "Radio Bart" has received a positive critical reception from television critics.

It acquired a Nielsen rating of 14.1 and was the highest-rated show on Fox the week it aired. It was nominated for an Emmy Award but lost to A Claymation Easter.

== Plot ==
Homer sees a television commercial for the Superstar Celebrity Microphone — which can broadcast anyone's voice over AM radio — and impulsively buys one for Bart's birthday. At his party, Bart is crestfallen when he receives gifts such as a cactus, a label maker, and a new suit. At first, Bart dislikes the microphone, but he later uses it to play practical jokes, such as tricking Ned's sons, Rod and Todd, into believing that God is talking to them, eavesdropping on Lisa and Janey's conversations about boys, and convincing Homer that Martians are invading. He also uses the microphone to make it look like Mrs. Krabappel made flatulent noises.

Bart ends up losing the radio down a well, but plays this to his advantage, tricking the townspeople into thinking an orphan named Timmy O'Toole has fallen down the well. Although they are unable to rescue Timmy, since the well is too small to accommodate an adult, the entire town offers its love and moral support. Krusty persuades Sting to join other celebrities in recording a charity single, "We're Sending Our Love Down the Well".

Lisa catches Bart imitating Timmy's voice and reminds him that the townspeople will be angry at him for being duped, while correctly assuming that he put a "Property of Bart Simpson" label on the radio. Out of fear of reprisal, Bart tries to climb down in the well to retrieve the radio after nightfall but falls down to the bottom when police officers Eddie and Lou kick the rope Bart used to lower himself down the well. When the townspeople find Bart trapped there, he admits Timmy does not exist. Angry at being tricked, the townspeople refuse to rescue him.

After a tearful speech by Bart saying that there would be many things he would miss out on including what would happen in the family, Homer has finally had enough and decides to dig a tunnel and rescue Bart himself. Groundskeeper Willie helps Homer dig and soon several other residents join the excavation, finally rescuing Bart with help from Sting. The next day, Willie posts a warning sign near the well to prevent future accidents.

== Production ==
"Radio Bart" was written by Jon Vitti and directed by Carlos Baeza, though series creator Matt Groening came up with the idea for it. The episode was based on the 1951 film Ace in the Hole, which sees the story of a down-and-out journalist exploiting a story about a man trapped in a cave to re-jump start his career. Vitti did not watch the film until after the episode had been written; "[Groening] came in out of nowhere and just gave me, start to finish, the whole story." Vitti said renting the film was the first thing he did after finishing the script. He remarked, "It's surprisingly hard to rent. It's really dark and funny and it's by Billy Wilder, so you think it would be in stores, but it's not. It was hard to find."

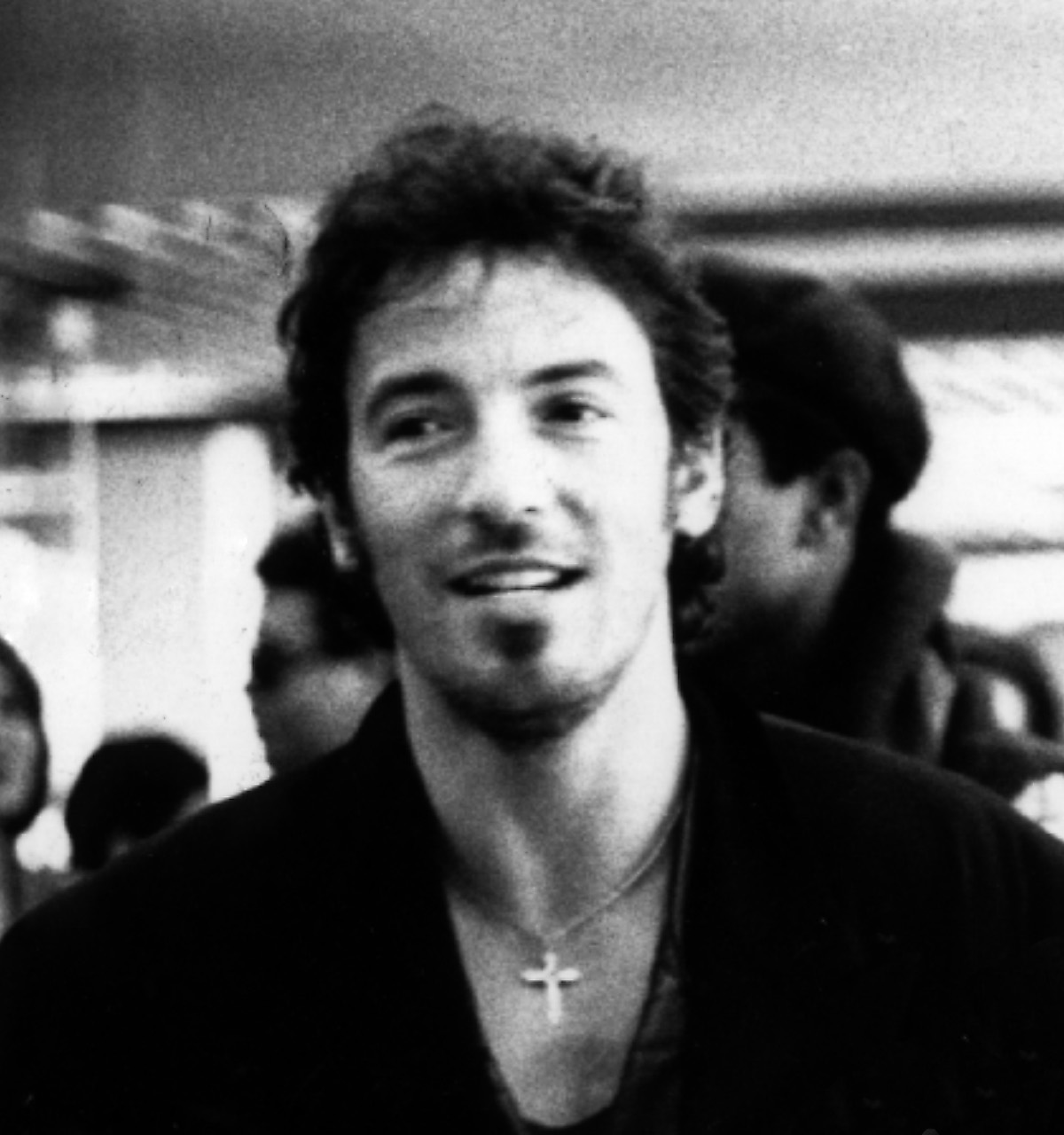
Bruce Springsteen declined an offer to feature in the episode.

The producers approached singer Bruce Springsteen to appear in the episode because he had participated to the charity song "We Are the World", on which "We're Sending Our Love Down the Well" is based. Springsteen declined so the producers offered the role to British musician Sting instead. Executive producer Al Jean said Sting is one of his favorite guest stars that have appeared on the show and he "couldn't have been better. He was really funny." The Simpsons director David Silverman said Sting's appearance in the episode worked for his persona because he has campaigned for political and social causes in real life. Sting was staying in New York City at the time of the episode's recording so Vitti flew there to record the lines with him.

The television commercial for the Superstar Celebrity Microphone that Homer watches, was inspired by a popular Ronco Mr. Microphone commercial from the late 1970s, in which a boy becomes popular and "scores with the girls" by using his microphone to be on the radio. Both commercials feature a boy riding by in a car full of friends saying, "Hey, good-looking, we'll be back to pick you up later", a line the staff thought was "hilarious". In the Superstar Celebrity Microphone commercial, the boy sings the 1975 song "Convoy" by C. W. McCall into the microphone. The producers originally wanted him to sing "The Wreck of the Edmund Fitzgerald" by Gordon Lightfoot, a song about the sinking of the bulk carrier SS Edmund Fitzgerald on Lake Superior. However, Lightfoot's licensing arrangement handed over all profits from the song to the next of kin of the twenty-nine crewmen who died on the ship. As such, any parodies require permission from every single family, so "Convoy" was used instead.

== Cultural references ==
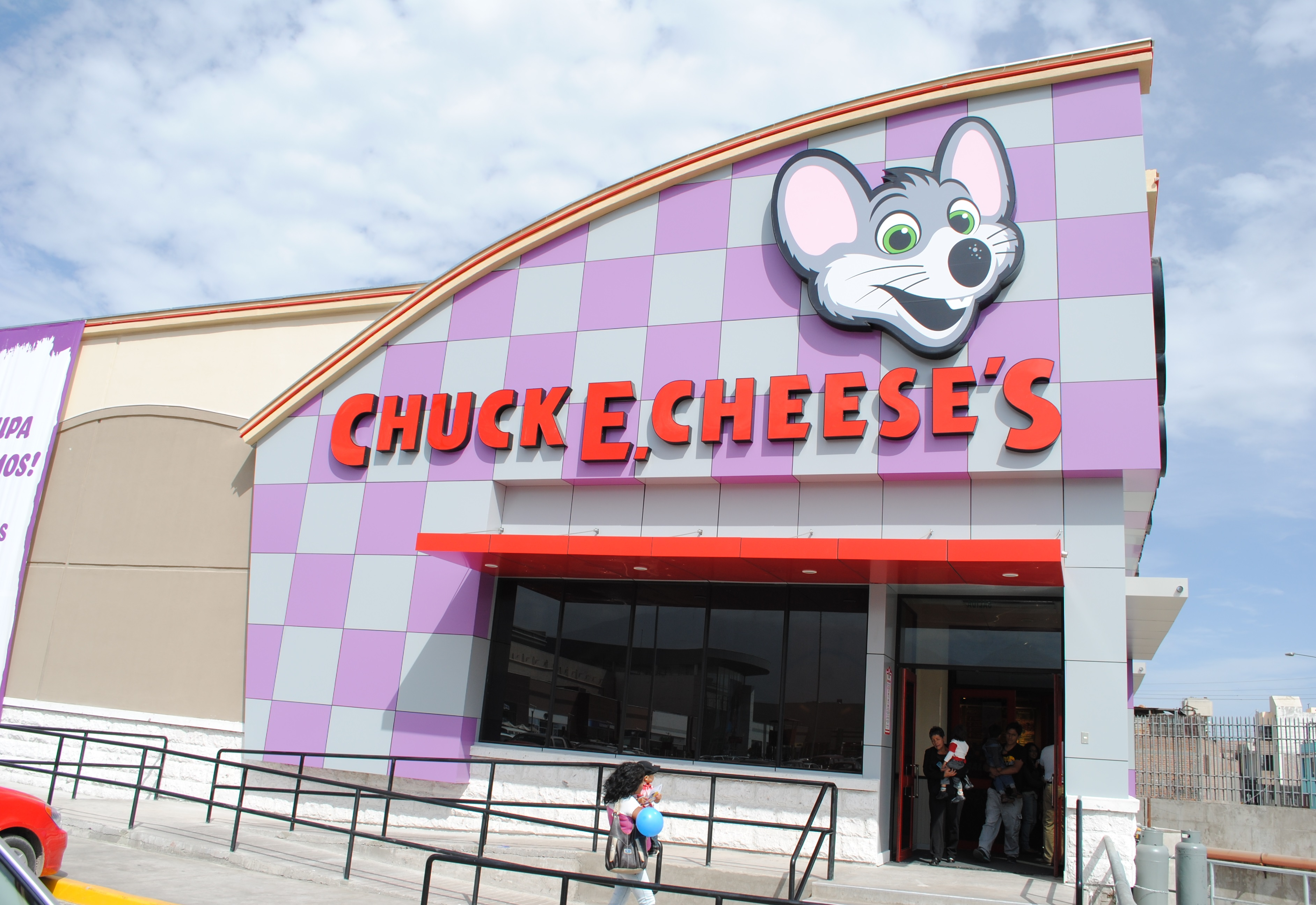
Wall E. Weasel's is a parody of Chuck E. Cheese's.

The plotline is similar to an incident involving Jessica McClure, a young girl who fell into a well and received support from citizens and celebrities. At the beginning of the episode, Homer watches the show Soul Train and its host Don Cornelius on television. One citizen suggests using chocolate attached to a fish-hook to save Timmy, a reference to the character Quint from the 1975 film Jaws. The episode also parodies charity records. The song "We're Sending Our Love Down the Well" is a spoof of "We Are the World", and the idea of celebrities singing it is based on USA for Africa, the name under which forty-five famous artists recorded "We Are the World". It is also parodying the documentary music video for Voices that Care sung by a supergroup of celebrities for the benefit of American troops fighting in Operation Desert Storm which FOX aired as a primetime special on February 28, 1991 despite it being the same day when fighting was declared over.

The background music heard when Bart sneaks down the well is based on "Axel F" from the film Beverly Hills Cop, and would later become a recurring track in other episodes. The Wall E. Weasel's pizza restaurant at which Bart celebrates his birthday is a parody of the family pizza restaurant franchise Chuck E. Cheese's. The song that overtakes, "We're Sending Our Love Down the Well": "I Do Believe We're Naked" shows a band called "Funky See Funky Do" with one man in dreadlocks and another in a hi-top fade. The band was supposed to be akin to Milli Vanilli, but the producers admitted they mistakenly spoofed the appearance of Kid N' Play. While they are digging the tunnel, Apu tells the crew that a nearby canary has died. Canaries were historically used by miners to detect the release of poisonous gases. Sting's band, The Police had a song called "Canary in a Coal Mine" which was on their third studio album Zenyatta Mondatta. When Sting is digging tirelessly and Marge admits they do not own any of his albums, Homer warns her not to alienate Sting by saying "Quiet, he is a good digger", a reference to one of Sting's youthful careers as a ditchdigger before making it in music.

== Reception ==
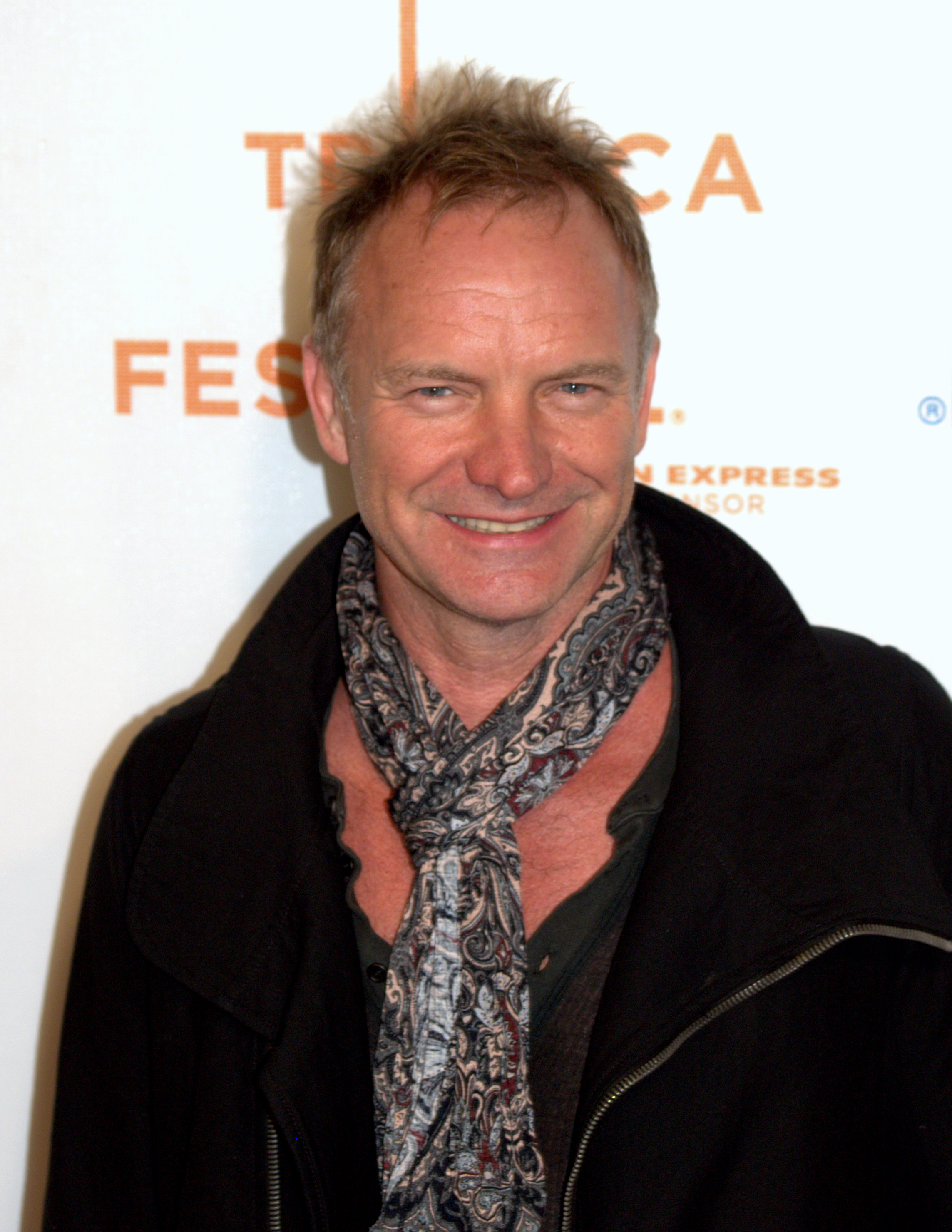
Sting was praised for his performance in the episode.

In its original American broadcast, "Radio Bart" finished 31st in the ratings for the week of Jan. 6–12, 1992, with a Nielsen rating of 14.1, equivalent to approximately 13 million viewing households. It was the highest-rated show on Fox that week. The episode was nominated for a Primetime Emmy Award for Outstanding Animated Program, but lost to Will Vinton's A Claymation Easter on CBS. "Radio Bart" was submitted for consideration because it was the staff's favorite episode of the season. Executive producer Al Jean said they thought this episode or an episode of The Ren & Stimpy Show would win and they were "absolutely floored" when neither did. The Simpsons director David Silverman said he thinks The Simpsons and Ren & Stimpy split the vote, allowing A Claymation Easter to win the Emmy.

Since airing, the episode has received mostly positive reviews from television critics. It was named the second-best episode of The Simpsons by Kirk Baird of the Las Vegas Sun and the third best episode by Sarah Culp of The Quindecim. DVD Movie Guide's Colin Jacobson commented: "Despite the potential for some heavy-handed moralizing, 'Radio Bart' provides a terrific show. From Bart's crappy birthday to his pranks to the public reaction to Timmy's trapping, the humor flies fast and furious in this excellent episode. It's one of the better ones." The Daily Telegraph characterized the episode as one of ten best episodes of The Simpsons. DVD Times's Chris Kaye said "Radio Bart" is "another demonstration of the series' knack for cultural references, parodying the Billy Wilder movie Ace in the Hole". Entertainment Weekly ranked "Radio Bart" as the 20th best episode of The Simpsons and commented that "it's a media parody so sharp, we're still stinging a bit." When The Simpsons began streaming on Disney+ in 2019, former Simpsons writer and executive producer Bill Oakley named this one of the best classic Simpsons episodes to watch on the service.

Monsters and Critics' Trent McMartin praised Sting's guest performance, calling it "humorous,” Total Film's Nathan Ditum ranked his performance as the 11th best guest appearance in the show's history. The authors of the book “I Can't Believe It's a Bigger and Better Updated Unofficial Simpsons Guide,” Gary Russell and Gareth Roberts, commented that "The Police had a song called 'Canary in the Coalmine' (the episode contains a scene where a canary dies in the well, but is later determined by Dr. Hibbert to have died by 'natural causes'), and Sting had made a point of campaigning for good causes, which explains why he was singled out in this sharp critique of celebrity posturing and media panic." Tom Nawrocki of Rolling Stone rated the "We're Sending Our Love Down the Well" song as one of the best musical moments in the history of the show. Nathan Rabin writes that "For all its transgressive naughtiness and impish satire, there’s something unmistakably old-fashioned, all-American and borderline wholesome about The Simpsons", praising the episode's parodies of Ace in the Hole and celebrity activism.

== Legacy ==
In the wake of the September 2017 Puebla earthquake in Mexico, the Mexican Navy reported that a child named Frida Sofia had been trapped within the debris of a fallen school. Reports regarding rescue attempts were widely publicized by Mexican media outlets. By September 21, when it became increasingly clear (and was later confirmed) that Sofia did not actually exist, internet users began to draw comparisons to the events of "Radio Bart"—to the point that "Timmy O'Toole" was trending on social media, and TV Azteca deliberately scheduled an airing of "Radio Bart" later that day in acknowledgement of the similarities.
