= Saturdays of Thunder =

- The Simpsons episode
- Episode no.: Season 3 Episode 9
- Directed by: Jim Reardon
- Written by: Ken Levine; David Isaacs
- Production code: 8F07
- Original air date: November 14, 1991

Guest appearances
- Phil Hartman as Troy McClure; Larry McKay as Football's Greatest Injuries Narrator

Episode features
- Chalkboard gag: "I will not fake rabies"
- Couch gag: The family falls through the couch due to the cushions being missing.
- Commentary: Matt Groening; Al Jean; Mike Reiss; Ken Levine; Jim Reardon; David Silverman

Episode chronology
← Previous "Lisa's Pony"	Next → "Flaming Moe's"
- The Simpsons season 3

"Saturdays of Thunder" is the ninth episode of the third season of the American animated television series The Simpsons. It originally aired on Fox in the United States on November 14, 1991. In the episode, Homer realizes he knows little about Bart and strives to be a better father. When he learns Bart is competing in a Soap Box Derby, Homer helps him make a racer. Bart drives Martin's far superior racer instead, hurting Homer's feelings. Homer eventually realizes he must be a good father by supporting Bart.

The episode was written by Ken Levine and David Isaacs, and directed by Jim Reardon. American actors Larry McKay and Phil Hartman voiced guest appearances as a television announcer and Troy McClure respectively. "Saturdays of Thunder" features cultural references to films such as Ben-Hur, Lethal Weapon, and Days of Thunder.

"Saturdays of Thunder" is the first episode to feature the full Alf Clausen arrangement of the show's theme song, which is still in use to this day, though it was slightly revamped beginning with "'Round Springfield".

Since airing, the episode has received mostly positive reviews from television critics, who praised its sports theme. It acquired a Nielsen rating of 14.9, and was the highest-rated show on Fox the week it aired.

== Plot ==
Marge makes Homer take a fatherhood quiz and discovers he knows next to nothing about his son. After a pep talk at the National Fatherhood Institute, Homer offers to help Bart build his own soapbox derby racer. At the qualifying race, Bart and Martin Prince form an alliance vowing to beat bully Nelson and his intimidating racer, the Roadkill 2000.

The racer that Bart and Homer build is so poorly made that it fails to accelerate and breaks down before reaching the finish line. Martin wins the race, but his aerodynamically designed vehicle veers out of control and crashes into a wall at high speed, leaving him with a broken arm. He allows Bart to take his place as driver. Feeling betrayed, Homer rejects Bart's attempt to apologize for switching vehicles, denounces both boys, and angrily tells Bart to do whatever he wants.

Marge reminds Homer that she has defended him in the past, but his recent actions prove he is a bad father. As Bart prepares for the finals with Martin's newly tuned racer, Homer takes the fatherhood quiz again and finds that he can now answer all the questions due to having spent so much time with Bart. Homer hurries to the race and wishes Bart luck, telling Bart he will be proud of him regardless of who wins. Nelson repeatedly tries to cheat and force Bart to crash, but Bart wins the race and the championship. He and Homer savor their victory, though Martin tries to take all the credit as he actually built the winning racer. Homer and Bart ignore his remark as they lovingly embrace.

== Production ==
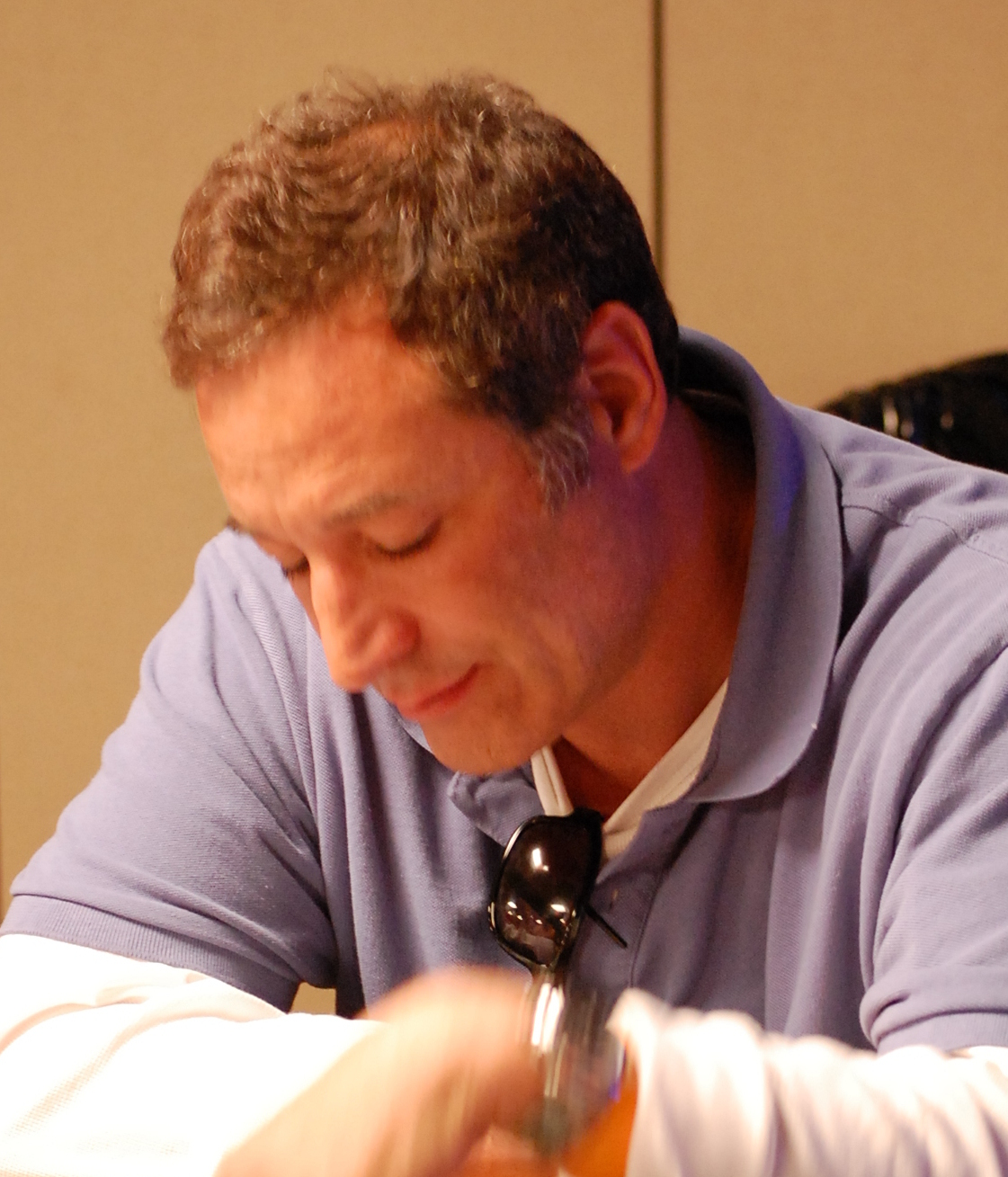
Executive producer Sam Simon found a real fatherhood test that served as the inspiration for the episode's subplot.

The episode was written by Ken Levine and David Isaacs, and directed by Jim Reardon. The inspiration originated from a line in "Itchy & Scratchy & Marge", in which Marge bans Bart and Lisa from watching their favorite cartoon, The Itchy & Scratchy Show, and Bart tells Lisa "Let's go finish our soap box racers." Phil Hartman made his fourth guest appearance on The Simpsons in this episode as Troy McClure. He appears at the beginning of the episode in I Can't Believe They Invented It!, a television show that Homer watches. Larry McKay guest starred as the television announcer at the Soap Box Derby.

The idea for the subplot of Homer's parenting originated from a real fatherhood test executive producer Sam Simon found and brought to the Simpsons studio. Levine later commented on writing the episode, "At the time David and I were writing this, my son, Matt, was about Bart's age. [...] So for me there was a certain amount of guilt associated, like 'Do I know my son's hobby? Do I know my son's best friend?' etc." The scene in which Bart welds on his racer resulted in an argument between the staff and Fox's censors, who were concerned that children would imitate Bart and misuse welding tools. The staff was able to convince them that very few children can even access welding tools.

== Cultural references ==
"Saturdays of Thunder" features a number of references to pop culture. The title is itself a play on the film Days of Thunder starring Tom Cruise. The song used at the end of the episode is "Wind Beneath My Wings" by Bette Midler. While Homer is watching television at the beginning of the episode, Marge and her sisters, Patty and Selma, go through a catalog of different hairstyles; Patty tells her sisters that she wants Mary Tyler Moore's hairstyle. When Marge and her sisters head to the beauty parlor, Homer promises Marge he will take Lisa to the video store. When they arrive at the store, Homer watches a clip from the latest McBain film that sees McBain's partner being brutally shot in the chest, a reference to a similar scene in the film Lethal Weapon. McBain's partner is black, a reference to the fact that Dirty Harry's partner is black in Sudden Impact.

When Homer calls the National Fatherhood Institute, he is put on hold and Harry Chapin's song "Cat's in the Cradle" plays while he waits. Cast member Harry Shearer based the voice of Dave, the director of the Fatherhood Institute, on actor Mason Adams. At the institute, Dave gives Homer a copy of the book Fatherhood by Bill Cosby. In a subsequent episode, "Dog of Death", Homer throws the book into the fireplace as replacement for wood. When Homer and Bart build the soapbox racer, Mac Davis's song "Watching Scotty Grow", sung by Bobby Goldsboro, plays on the soundtrack. The whipping and spikes coming out of Nelson's racer are a reference to the chariot race in Ben-Hur. The idea of Nelson's racer being "armed with every dirty trick in the book" was based on the 1973 Soap Box Derby World Championship scandal, when a 14-year-old boy was stripped of his title two days after winning the national race for cheating. During the final race, Homer stands up in the crowd to cheer on Bart and his body is silhouetted against the sun, a reference to a scene in The Natural; the theme from The Natural plays in the scene.

== Reception ==
"Saturdays of Thunder" originally aired on the Fox network in the United States on November 14, 1991. It received high ratings due to the fact that it was immediately followed by the premiere of the music video for Michael Jackson's song "Black or White". In its original American broadcast, the episode finished 26th in the ratings for the week of November 11–17, 1991, with a Nielsen rating of 14.9, equivalent to approximately 13.7 million viewing households. It was the highest-rated show on Fox that week.

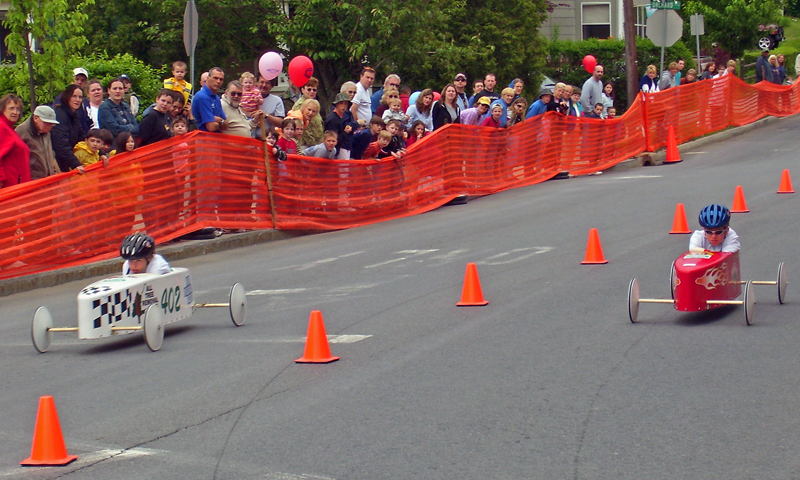
This image depicts a race similar to the ones featured in the episode, which was praised for its sports theme. Some critics, however, thought the Soap Box Derby plotline had limited modern day appeal because few practice the sport any more.

Since airing, the episode has received mostly positive reviews from television critics. Niel Harvey of The Roanoke Times called it a "classic bit of Simpsonia," and the Daily Record said it is "definitely one not to miss". The Orlando Sentinel's Gregory Hardy named it the sixth best episode of the show with a sports theme. Michael Coulter of The Age commented that "Saturdays of Thunder" is "one of the many excellent" The Simpsons episodes to feature a sporting theme. He went on to say: "A 'classic' Simpsons, insofar as it boasts a plot, rather than a sequence of surreal pop-culture parodies".

The episode's parody of Ben-Hur was named the eighth greatest film reference in the history of the show by Total Film's Nathan Ditum. Bill Gibron of DVD Verdict looked unfavorably on the episode, writing that it "has a premise—Bart builds a soapbox racer—that frankly has very limited modern day appeal. We can't really get into the whole Martin/Nelson/Bart race dynamic and today, soapbox derby has been technologized all out of proportion to the point where very few, if any, practice it. With such a narrow target, many of the jokes just don't work." Gibron preferred the subplot of Homer's attempts to become a better father.

Nate Meyers of Digitally Obsessed was more positive about the episode, commenting that the emphasis is on Homer's parenting, like many other season three episodes, and "contrary to popular opinion, Homer is actually a good father who tries to do good by his children." He thought the racing sequences featured "good animation and direction", but considered the highlight to be the clip from the film McBain that Homer watches in the video store. Meyers rated the episode a 4 (of 5).

DVD Movie Guide's Colin Jacobson, who listed the episode as one of his favorites from season three, said that "on the surface, 'Saturdays of Thunder' essentially just rehashes" the theme of the previous episode, "Lisa's Pony", in which Homer tries to be a better father for Lisa. Jacobson commented that "Saturdays of Thunder", however, "simply seems funnier than 'Lisa's Pony'. The soapbox derby elements provide lots of great gags. [It] offers a great episode." Like Meyers, the authors of the book I Can't Believe It's a Bigger and Better Updated Unofficial Simpsons Guide thought the highlight of the episode was the McBain clip. Nathan Rabin writes: "If 'Saturdays of Thunder' is formulaic that’s probably because at this point the show was operating at such a high level that it didn’t need a constant influx of new ideas to remain vital... It was so good that the writers and producers could get a little cocky and formulaic. They could get away with the climactic big hug undercut by the closing sneer because at that point the show didn’t need to be blindingly original to be something close to perfect." He adds: "I love the resigned, reflective way Bart says, “Maybe it’s for the best” when informed that they’re finally hauling his father away, as if he'd been secretly anticipating that moment for years."
