= The Simpsons season 3 =

Season of television series

The Simpsons
- Season 3
- DVD cover featuring the Simpson family about to fall backwards
- Showrunners: Al Jean; Mike Reiss (22 episodes); James L. Brooks; Matt Groening; Sam Simon (2 episodes)
- No. of episodes: 24

Release
- Original network: Fox
- Original release: September 19, 1991 – August 27, 1992

Season chronology
- ← Previous; Season 2 Next → Season 4

The third season of the American animated sitcom The Simpsons aired on Fox between September 19, 1991, and August 27, 1992. The showrunners for the third production season were Al Jean and Mike Reiss who executive produced 22 episodes for the season, while two other episodes were produced by James L. Brooks, Matt Groening, and Sam Simon. An additional episode, "Brother, Can You Spare Two Dimes?", aired on August 27, 1992, after the official end of the third season and is included on the Season 3 DVD set. Season three won six Primetime Emmy Awards for "Outstanding Voice-Over Performance" and also received a nomination for "Outstanding Animated Program" for the episode "Radio Bart". The complete season was released on DVD in Region 1 on August 26, 2003, Region 2 on October 6, 2003, and in Region 4 on October 22, 2003.

== Production ==
Al Jean and Mike Reiss, who had written for The Simpsons since the start of the show, took over as showrunners this season. Their first episode as showrunners was "Mr. Lisa Goes to Washington" and they felt a lot of pressure about running the show. They also ran the following season and Jean would return as executive producer in season 13. There were two episodes, "Kamp Krusty" and "A Streetcar Named Marge", that were produced at the same time, but aired during season four as holdover episodes. Two episodes that aired during this season, "Stark Raving Dad" and "When Flanders Failed", were executive produced during the previous season by James L. Brooks, Matt Groening and Sam Simon. This was also the first season where Hank Azaria is credited as a main cast member instead of being a featured player (as he was in the first two seasons).

Carlos Baeza and Jeffrey Lynch received their first directing credits this season. Alan Smart, an assistant director and layout artist, would receive his only directing credit. One-time writers from this season include Robert Cohen, Howard Gewirtz, Ken Levine and David Isaacs. Bill Oakley and Josh Weinstein, who would later become story editors, became a part of the writing staff to replace Jay Kogen and Wallace Wolodarsky both of whom had decided to leave the next season. The current arrangement of the theme song by music composer Alf Clausen was introduced during this season, corresponding with the show now being produced and broadcast in Dolby Surround.

A crossover episode with the live-action sitcom Thirtysomething, titled "Thirtysimpsons", was written by David M. Stern for this season, but was never produced because it "never seemed to work". The crossover would involve Homer meeting a group of Yuppies and hanging out with them.

The season premiere episode was "Stark Raving Dad", which guest starred Michael Jackson as the speaking voice of Leon Kompowsky. One of Jackson's conditions for guest starring was that he voiced himself under a pseudonym. While he recorded the voice work for the character, all of his singing was performed by Kipp Lennon, because of contractual obligations that Jackson had with his recording company. This allowed him to play a joke on his brothers and fool them into thinking the impersonator was him. Jackson's lines and Lennon's vocals were recorded at a second session by Brooks. The January 30, 1992 rerun of the episode featured a brief alternate opening, which was written in response to a comment made by then-President of the United States George H. W. Bush. On January 27, Bush made a speech during his re-election campaign where he said, "We are going to keep on trying to strengthen the American family, to make American families a lot more like The Waltons and a lot less like The Simpsons." The writers decided to add a response in the next broadcast of The Simpsons, which was a rerun of "Stark Raving Dad" on January 30. The broadcast included a new tongue-in-cheek opening where they watch Bush's speech. Bart replies, "Hey, we're just like the Waltons. We're praying for an end to the Depression, too,” (referring to the early 1990s recession.)

On April 30, The Simpsons aired a repeat episode opposite the final episode of The Cosby Show on NBC. After the episode was over, a short clip of new animation showed Bart and Homer happily watching The Cosby Show finale. Bart asks Homer why Bill Cosby took the show off the air when it is still very popular. Homer replies that, "Mr. Cosby wanted to end the show before the quality began to suffer." Bart replies, "Quality, shmality. If I had a TV show, I'd run that sucker into the ground!"

"Homer at the Bat" is the first episode in the series to feature a large supporting cast of guest stars. The idea was suggested by Sam Simon, who wanted an episode filled with real Major League Baseball players. They did manage to get nine players who agreed to guest star and they were recorded over a period of six months.

This season's production run (8F) was the last to be animated by Klasky Csupo, before the show's producers Gracie Films opted to switch domestic production of the series to Film Roman. Sharon Bernstein of the Los Angeles Times wrote that "Gracie executives had been unhappy with the producer Csupo had assigned to The Simpsons and said the company also hoped to obtain better wages and working conditions for animators at Film Roman." Klasky Csupo co-founder Gábor Csupó had been "asked [by Gracie Films] if they could bring in their own producer [to oversee the animation production]," but declined, stating, "they wanted to tell me how to run my business."

== Voice cast & characters ==
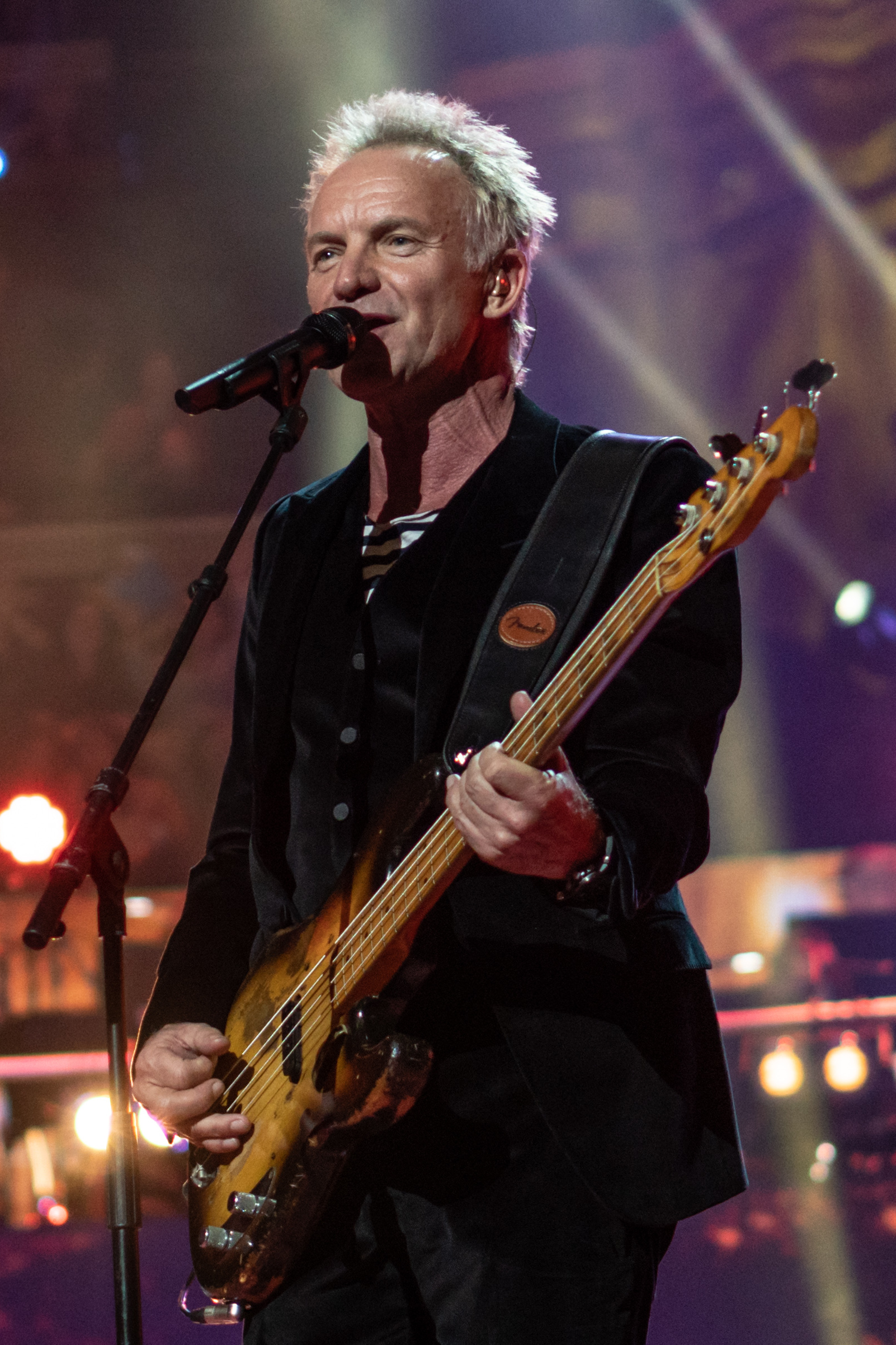
Musician Sting guest-starred in "Radio Bart"

The season saw the introduction of several new recurring characters, including Lunchlady Doris, Fat Tony, Legs and Louie, Rabbi Hyman Krustofsky, Lurleen Lumpkin, and Kirk and Luann Van Houten.

=== Main cast ===
- Dan Castellaneta as Homer Simpson, Grampa Simpson, Krusty the Clown, Mayor Quimby, Groundskeeper Willie, Barney Gumble and various others
- Julie Kavner as Marge Simpson, Patty Bouvier, Selma Bouvier and various others
- Nancy Cartwright as Bart Simpson, Nelson Muntz, Ralph Wiggum and various others
- Yeardley Smith as Lisa Simpson
- Hank Azaria as Moe Szyslak, Chief Wiggum, Professor Frink, Carl Carlson, Comic Book Guy, Apu and various others
- Harry Shearer as Mr. Burns, Waylon Smithers, Ned Flanders, Principal Skinner, Dr. Hibbert, Lenny Leonard, Kent Brockman, Reverend Lovejoy, Derek Smalls, and various others

=== Recurring ===
- Pamela Hayden as Milhouse Van Houten, Jimbo Jones
- Maggie Roswell as Maude Flanders, Helen Lovejoy, Luann Van Houten and Miss Hoover
- Russi Taylor as Martin Prince and Sherri and Terri
- Tress MacNeille as Agnes Skinner
- Marcia Wallace as Edna Krabappel
- Frank Welker as Santa's Little Helper, various other animals
- Jo Ann Harris as additional characters

=== Guest stars ===
- Phil Hartman as Troy McClure, Lionel Hutz, various others (various episodes)
- Kipp Lennon as Leon Kompowsky's singing voice ("Stark Raving Dad") and singing "Flaming Moe's" ("Flaming Moe's")
- Michael Jackson (credited as John Jay Smith) as Leon Kompowsky ("Stark Raving Dad")
- Joe Mantegna as Fat Tony and TV Fat Tony (himself; "Bart the Murderer")
- Neil Patrick Harris as TV Bart (himself; "Bart the Murderer")
- Jon Lovitz as Aristotle Amadopolis and Avery Devereaux ("Homer Defined")
- Magic Johnson (credited as Earvin Johnson Jr.) as himself ("Homer Defined")
- Chick Hearn as himself ("Homer Defined")
- Jackie Mason as Hyman Krustofsky ("Like Father, Like Clown")
- Larry McKay as Football's Greatest Injuries Narrator ("Saturdays of Thunder")
- Aerosmith as themselves ("Flaming Moe's")
- Sting as himself ("Radio Bart")
- Wade Boggs as himself ("Homer at the Bat")
- Jose Canseco as himself ("Homer at the Bat")
- Roger Clemens as himself ("Homer at the Bat")
- Ken Griffey Jr. as himself ("Homer at the Bat")
- Don Mattingly as himself ("Homer at the Bat")
- Mike Scioscia as himself ("Homer at the Bat")
- Steve Sax as himself ("Homer at the Bat")
- Ozzie Smith as himself ("Homer at the Bat")
- Darryl Strawberry as himself ("Homer at the Bat")
- Terry Cashman singing "Talkin' Softball" ("Homer at the Bat")
- Steve Allen as Bart's electronically altered voice ("Separate Vocations")
- Beverly D'Angelo as Lurleen Lumpkin ("Colonel Homer")
- Kelsey Grammer as Sideshow Bob ("Black Widower")
- Christopher Guest as Nigel Tufnel ("The Otto Show")
- Michael McKean as David St. Hubbins ("The Otto Show")
- Kimmy Robertson as Samantha Stanky ("Bart's Friend Falls in Love")
- Danny DeVito as Herb Powell ("Brother, Can You Spare Two Dimes?")
- Joe Frazier as himself ("Brother, Can You Spare Two Dimes?")

== Reception ==
The season was critically acclaimed and remains popular among the show's fans. In 2003, Entertainment Weekly published a list of its 25 favorite episodes and placed "Homer at the Bat", "Flaming Moe's" and "Radio Bart" at 15th, 16th and 20th positions, respectively. On Rotten Tomatoes, the third season of The Simpsons has a 100% approval rating based on 5 critical reviews. IGN.com made a list of the best guest appearances in the show's history, and placed Aerosmith at 24, Spinal Tap at 18, the "Homer at the Bat" baseball players at 17, Jon Lovitz at eight, and Michael Jackson at number five. IGN would later name "Flaming Moe's" the best episode of the third season. Chris Turner, the author of the book Planet Simpson, believes that the third season marks the beginning of "the Golden Age" of The Simpsons and pinpoints "Homer at the Bat" as the first episode of the era. Bill Oakley has described the season as "the best season of any TV show of all time", pinpointing its success to the fact that "a lot of the stories were pretty grounded, but they took a couple of crazy leaps out into space with like, 'Homer at the Bat'", stating that he and Josh Weinstein used the season as a model when they were The Simpsons' showrunners for seasons 7 and 8. John Swartzwelder considered the season to be the best one during his time on the show saying, "By Season 3 we had learned how to grind out first-class 'Simpsons' episodes with surprising regularity, we had developed a big cast of characters to work with, we hadn't even come close to running out of story lines, and the staff hadn't been worn down by overwork yet. Season 3 was a fun year to be in the 'Simpsons' writers' room, and I think it shows in the work."

== Awards ==
1992 was The Simpsons' most successful year at the Primetime Emmy Awards, with the series receiving six Emmys, all for "Outstanding Voice-Over Performance", a category which, at the time, was juried rather than competitive. The recipients were: Nancy Cartwright as Bart Simpson in "Separate Vocations"; Dan Castellaneta as Homer Simpson in "Lisa's Pony"; Julie Kavner as Marge Simpson in "I Married Marge"; Jackie Mason as Rabbi Hyman Krustofski in "Like Father, Like Clown"; Yeardley Smith as Lisa Simpson in "Lisa the Greek"; and Marcia Wallace as Edna Krabappel in "Bart the Lover". Mason is the only irregular guest star from the show to win an Emmy. The series received three other Emmy nominations: for "Outstanding Animated Program" with the episode "Radio Bart"; for "Outstanding Individual Achievement in Music Composition for a Series (Dramatic Underscore)" (Alf Clausen) and "Outstanding Individual Achievement in Sound Mixing for a Comedy Series or a Special" (Brad Brock, Peter Cole, Anthony D'Amico, Gary Gegan), both for the episode "Treehouse of Horror II".

The series also won an Annie Award for Best Animated Television Production, an Environmental Media Award nomination for "Best Television Episodic Comedy" for the episode "Mr. Lisa Goes to Washington", and a People's Choice Award nomination for "Favorite Series Among Young People".

At the 8th annual Television Critics Association Awards, the third season of the show was nominated for 'Outstanding Achievement in Comedy,' losing to "Seinfeld". Additionally, it was nominated for 'Program of the Year' but lost to Northern Exposure.

== Episodes ==
No. overall	No. in season	Title	Directed by	Written by	Original release date	Prod. code	U.S. viewers (millions)
36	1	"Stark Raving Dad"	Rich Moore	Al Jean & Mike Reiss	September 19, 1991	7F24	22.9
Homer's sanity is called into question when he arrives at work wearing a pink shirt. After Bart takes Homer's mental stability test for him, Homer is committed to a mental hospital where he meets a big, hulking bald man who says his name is Michael Jackson. Meanwhile, Lisa is depressed over her upcoming eighth birthday, but is very happy in the end to receive a song that is written specially for her birthday. Guest star: Michael Jackson (speaking parts only). Created as "John Jay Smith". Note: Shortly before the acquisition of 21st Century Fox by Disney was completed, in the wake of renewed sexual abuse allegations against guest star Michael Jackson, this episode was removed from syndication in March 2019 and was banned from circulation, and is the only episode of the series not available for streaming on Disney+, on which "Mr. Lisa Goes to Washington" currently appears as premiere episode.
37	2	"Mr. Lisa Goes to Washington"	Wes Archer	George Meyer	September 26, 1991	8F01	20.2
While reading a copy of Reading Digest, Homer finds an entry form for an essay contest for which Lisa signs up. When she wins the contest, she and the family travel to Washington, D.C. where the finals are to be held. Here, Lisa bears witness to the seedy underbelly of politics and becomes bitterly disappointed after learning of a bribery scandal involving Springfield's state congressman. In her final essay, she disdains and condemns the government system, which leads to the arrest of the corrupt congressman. While she fails to win the contest, her faith in government is restored.
38	3	"When Flanders Failed"	Jim Reardon	Jon Vitti	October 3, 1991	7F23	22.8
Homer makes a wish for Ned Flanders to be a financial failure. The wish comes to life when Flanders's store catering to left-handed people goes out of business, causing the Flanders family to end up financially in trouble. When finding out that Ned's house is to be repossessed, Homer feels guilty and decides to help by telling all the left-handed population of Springfield about the Leftorium and calling in a few favors from his friends. This helps Ned keep the store and get his house back. Meanwhile, Bart goes to the Japanese bartender Akira and takes karate lessons, but quits after he discovers that it is not as interesting as he had expected it to be.
39	4	"Bart the Murderer"	Rich Moore	John Swartzwelder	October 10, 1991	8F03	20.8
After suffering from bad luck, Bart stumbles upon the "Legitimate Businessman's Social Club" Mafia bar where the leader, Fat Tony, hires him to work as their permanent bartender. However, when Principal Skinner ends up missing for nearly a week, Bart is immediately blamed for murdering him, causing Bart to get sent to court. As Bart is about to get convicted, the principal shows up which leads to Bart being cleared of all the charges.
40	5	"Homer Defined"	Mark Kirkland	Howard Gewirtz	October 17, 1991	8F04	20.6
Homer accidentally saves the Springfield Nuclear Power Plant and is ashamed when people mistake him for a hero. When another impending meltdown threatens the Shelbyville plant, he is asked to perform his heroic deeds once again. He is lucky again, but this time he is derided as a lucky imbecile, even more so than he was hailed as a hero. Meanwhile, Milhouse's mom forbids him to be friends with Bart as she feels he is a bad influence on him.
41	6	"Like Father, Like Clown"	Jeffrey Lynch & Brad Bird	Jay Kogen & Wallace Wolodarsky	October 24, 1991	8F05	20.2
When Krusty comes over to the Simpsons' house for dinner, he reveals to them that he is of Jewish heritage, and that his father, Rabbi Krustofski disowned him for pursuing a career in comedy, and not a successful career as a rabbi. Krusty starts to fall apart and Bart and Lisa decide to contact the rabbi and convince him to forgive Krusty. The rabbi, at first, refuses to see Krusty again, but Bart convinces him to do so, and the two reconcile.
42	7	"Treehouse of Horror II"	Jim Reardon	Al Jean & Mike Reiss	October 31, 1991	8F02	20.0
42	7	"Treehouse of Horror II"	Jim Reardon	Jeff Martin & George Meyer	October 31, 1991	8F02	20.0
42	7	"Treehouse of Horror II"	Jim Reardon	Sam Simon & John Swartzwelder	October 31, 1991	8F02	20.0
When Homer, Bart, and Lisa eat a ton of candy, the three begin having various nightmares.: In Lisa's nightmare ("The Monkey's Paw"), the Simpsons visit Morocco and find a monkey's paw that makes all their wishes come true – with dire consequences. Homer eventually gives the paw to Ned, who improves his home.; In Bart's nightmare ("The Bart Zone"), the town of Springfield must think happy thoughts or suffer the powers of Bart's twisted imagination. Dr. Marvin Monroe prescribes that Homer should spend quality time together. As this happens, Bart wakes from his dream, horrified.; In Homer's nightmare ("If I Only Had a Brain"), Mr. Burns transplants Homer's brain into a robot to create a super-efficient worker. The robot remains as incompetent and inefficient as regular Homer, and Burns restores Homer's brain to his body. Homer wakes after Burns is accidentally crushed by the robot, and finds Burns' head is grafted on his shoulder.
43	8	"Lisa's Pony"	Carlos Baeza	Al Jean & Mike Reiss	November 7, 1991	8F06	23.0
When Lisa requires a new saxophone reed for her talent recital, she asks Homer, who immediately promises to buy her one. Although Homer breaks his promise, he makes up for it by giving Lisa the one thing she had always wanted, a pony named Princess. With a new pony in the house, Homer struggles with two jobs to cover the cost. Lisa, upon seeing what Homer must go through to pay for the pony, decides to sell it.
44	9	"Saturdays of Thunder"	Jim Reardon	Ken Levine & David Isaacs	November 14, 1991	8F07	24.7
After taking a fatherhood quiz, Homer realizes that he knows nothing about Bart, and in the result, strives to be a better father after learning that Bart is one of the racers in the Soapbox Derby. Their entry is not very good, so Bart decides to drive Martin Prince's much nicer racer. Homer is at first devastated, but decides that he must be a good father and support Bart. Bart later goes on to win the race.
45	10	"Flaming Moe's"	Rich Moore & Alan Smart	Robert Cohen	November 21, 1991	8F08	23.9
One night at Moe's Tavern, Homer tells Moe Szyslak of a secret alcoholic cocktail made with cough syrup and fire that he calls "Flaming Homer". When Moe tries Homer's recipe in the bar, he finds it boosts his business and patronage, so Moe steals the recipe from Homer. Later, Moe is about to sell the recipe for $1 million but Homer comes and divulges the secret ingredient, only to find out that Moe was planning to split the million with him. Guest stars: Aerosmith
46	11	"Burns Verkaufen der Kraftwerk"	Mark Kirkland	Jon Vitti	December 5, 1991	8F09	21.1
The stock in the Nuclear Plant skyrockets amid rumors of a takeover meaning that all the workers get rich, except for Homer who has sold his stockholding for a mere $25 and fears that he will lose his job. The rumors prove true as two German businessmen buy the plant from Mr. Burns for $100 million and fire Homer for incompetence. Mr. Burns decides to buy the plant back when he discovers that his former employees no longer fear him.
47	12	"I Married Marge"	Jeffrey Lynch	Jeff Martin	December 26, 1991	8F10	21.9
After worrying that she may yet again be pregnant, Marge drives to Dr. Hibbert's office. While anxiously waiting, Homer begins to tell Bart, Lisa, and Maggie about how he and Marge got married at a quickie wedding chapel, and how he attempted to prove to Marge's sisters that he can provide for their upcoming child.
48	13	"Radio Bart"	Carlos Baeza	Jon Vitti	January 9, 1992	8F11	24.2
When Bart's birthday party turns into a disaster, he uses a radio transmitter microphone Homer gave him to play pranks on other citizens. He decides to throw a radio down an old well and tricks the town into thinking a little boy is stuck in it. At first he is successful, but Lisa reminds him that he left a "property of Bart Simpson" label on the radio and goes to retrieve it. Bart becomes trapped in the well and the town gets angry and decide to leave him there. Homer later gets fed up with the townspeople's ignorance and frantically tries to rescue him. He digs a hole near the well, which helps the townspeople realise the error of their ways and offer help. Guest star: Sting (musician)
49	14	"Lisa the Greek"	Rich Moore	Jay Kogen & Wallace Wolodarsky	January 23, 1992	8F12	23.2
Homer begins to bond with Lisa after learning her unique and convenient ability to pick winning American football teams. However, Homer secretly takes advantage of Lisa's ability, using it to gamble money off Moe. When Homer selfishly chooses going bowling with Barney instead of going on a mountain hike with Lisa, Lisa finds out Homer had only been using her for gambling, and refuses to speak to him until he fully understands her.
50	15	"Homer Alone"	Mark Kirkland	David M. Stern	February 6, 1992	8F14	23.7
The family's dependence on Marge causes her to suffer a nervous breakdown during her early morning errands, and she decides to go to a spa resort to calm down. Homer, meanwhile, has to care for the troublesome Maggie while Bart and Lisa spend their time with their spinster aunts, Patty and Selma. The entire family realizes how much they need Marge to take care of things, and everybody is happy when she eventually returns from the spa.
51	16	"Bart the Lover"	Carlos Baeza	Jon Vitti	February 13, 1992	8F16	20.5
When a yo-yo craze sweeps over Springfield Elementary School, Bart's errant yo-yo happens to break a fish tank, killing the class goldfish. Edna Krabappel sentences Bart to a month of detention. Bart decides to write phony love letters to her under the guise of a man who responded to her personal ad. Meanwhile, Homer tries to cut back on swearing after Flanders complains that Todd is picking up on the foul language.
52	17	"Homer at the Bat"	Jim Reardon	John Swartzwelder	February 20, 1992	8F13	24.6
The Springfield Nuclear Power Plant softball team proves to be a huge success with Homer as their official star player. But after Mr. Burns makes a bet with Shelbyville Nuclear Power Plant owner Aristotle Amadopolis, he hires nine professional baseball players to fill out the team. However, eight of those ringers fall victim to separate misfortunes, and Burns is forced to turn to his regular employees, who win the game. Guest stars: Wade Boggs, Jose Canseco, Roger Clemens, Ken Griffey Jr., Don Mattingly, Mike Scioscia, Steve Sax, Ozzie Smith and Darryl Strawberry
53	18	"Separate Vocations"	Jeffrey Lynch	George Meyer	February 27, 1992	8F15	23.7
The school makes the students take an aptitude test, and it ends up suggesting Bart become a policeman and Lisa become a homemaker instead of a professional jazz musician. While Lisa becomes a troublemaker, Bart improves his grades and behavior and is chosen to be Principal Skinner's newest hall monitor.
54	19	"Dog of Death"	Jim Reardon	John Swartzwelder	March 12, 1992	8F17	23.4
Santa's Little Helper falls ill and the family must make budget cuts in order to pay for his operation. Although his own life is saved, the family begins getting angry with him for losing out on their favorite things so he runs away. Santa's Little Helper ends up in the possession of Mr. Burns, who trains him to become a vicious attack dog. Bart stumbles across the new Santa's Little Helper and is attacked, but Santa's Little Helper recognizes Bart and decides to stop the attack.
55	20	"Colonel Homer"	Mark Kirkland	Matt Groening	March 26, 1992	8F19	25.5
After his behavior at the movie theater embarrasses Marge, she and Homer have a large argument, causing him to head to a redneck bar where he meets a beautiful barmaid named Lurleen Lumpkin with a talent for singing. Homer becomes her manager and does everything he can to make Lurleen famous, but it takes a very long time for him to notice Lurleen has fallen in love with him. With Marge already upset and thinking Homer's the one with the roving eyes, it is time for him to decide on his romantic future.
56	21	"Black Widower"	David Silverman	Story by : Thomas Chastain & Sam Simon; Teleplay by : Jon Vitti	April 9, 1992	8F20	17.3
Selma reveals that she has a new boyfriend that she met through the prison pen-pal program, Sideshow Bob. Bart is immediately suspicious of Bob, but Bob does everything he can to romance Selma and prove he's changed. After Selma and Bob are married, Bob reveals that he plans to kill Selma, but he is stopped by Bart.
57	22	"The Otto Show"	Wes Archer	Jeff Martin	April 23, 1992	8F21	17.5
Otto crashes the school bus, and it is later discovered that he never actually owned a real driver's license, prompting the authorities to fire him. Otto then moves in with the Simpsons after he has been evicted, and attempts to teach Bart to learn to play the guitar, though with difficulty. But it's the way he enrages Homer that might provide an inadvertent return ticket to his beloved bus-driving job.
58	23	"Bart's Friend Falls in Love"	Jim Reardon	Jay Kogen & Wallace Wolodarsky	May 7, 1992	8F22	19.5
Milhouse falls in love with the new girl, Samantha Stankey, jeopardizing Bart and Milhouse's friendship. Bart eventually calls Samantha's father and lets him know what is happening. Her father takes her away, which leads to Bart and Millhouse having a fight. Meanwhile, Homer orders a subliminal cassette tape to help him lose weight, but is sent one that helps him increase his vocabulary after the weight-loss tapes were sold out.
59	24	"Brother, Can You Spare Two Dimes?"	Rich Moore	John Swartzwelder	August 27, 1992	8F23	17.2
When the radiation from the Nuclear Power Plant causes Homer to become infertile, he is awarded a complete $2,000 compensation. Meanwhile, Homer's half-brother, Herb, now living on the streets, returns with a plan on how to regain his name, wealth, and life back and reluctantly turns to Homer for help. Herb asks for Homer's $2,000 so he can develop a new product that will translate baby gibberish into speech. Guest star: Danny DeVito

== DVD release ==
The DVD box set for season three was released by 20th Century Fox Home Entertainment in the United States and Canada on August 26, 2003, eleven years after it had completed broadcast on television. As well as every episode from the season, the DVD release features bonus material including commentaries for every episode. The commentaries were recorded in early 2003. Prints produced after 2019 no longer include the episode "Stark Raving Dad" in response to allegations of child sexual assault against guest star Michael Jackson.

The Complete Third Season
Set details			Special features
24 episodes (before 2019), 23 episodes (after 2019); 4-disc set; 1.33:1 aspect ratio; AUDIO; English 5.1 Dolby Digital; Spanish 2.0 Dolby Surround; French 2.0 Dolby Surround; SUBTITLES; English SDH; Spanish			Optional commentaries for all 24 episodes, plus four Easter egg commentaries featuring either Al Jean or Mike Reiss; Trivia tracks for "Colonel Homer"; Storyboards; Commercials; Easter egg audio outtakes; Multi Language Featurette; Treehouse of Horror II; Czech 2.0; Polish 2.0; Clip from the 1991 Macy's Thanksgiving Day Parade featuring a balloon of Bart; Jukebox Feature (11 songs); Previously unseen promo footage of "Colonel Homer"
Release dates			Optional commentaries for all 24 episodes, plus four Easter egg commentaries featuring either Al Jean or Mike Reiss; Trivia tracks for "Colonel Homer"; Storyboards; Commercials; Easter egg audio outtakes; Multi Language Featurette; Treehouse of Horror II; Czech 2.0; Polish 2.0; Clip from the 1991 Macy's Thanksgiving Day Parade featuring a balloon of Bart; Jukebox Feature (11 songs); Previously unseen promo footage of "Colonel Homer"
Region 1	Region 2	Region 4	Optional commentaries for all 24 episodes, plus four Easter egg commentaries featuring either Al Jean or Mike Reiss; Trivia tracks for "Colonel Homer"; Storyboards; Commercials; Easter egg audio outtakes; Multi Language Featurette; Treehouse of Horror II; Czech 2.0; Polish 2.0; Clip from the 1991 Macy's Thanksgiving Day Parade featuring a balloon of Bart; Jukebox Feature (11 songs); Previously unseen promo footage of "Colonel Homer"
August 26, 2003	October 6, 2003	October 22, 2003	Optional commentaries for all 24 episodes, plus four Easter egg commentaries featuring either Al Jean or Mike Reiss; Trivia tracks for "Colonel Homer"; Storyboards; Commercials; Easter egg audio outtakes; Multi Language Featurette; Treehouse of Horror II; Czech 2.0; Polish 2.0; Clip from the 1991 Macy's Thanksgiving Day Parade featuring a balloon of Bart; Jukebox Feature (11 songs); Previously unseen promo footage of "Colonel Homer"
