= Bart the Murderer =

- The Simpsons episode
- Episode no.: Season 3 Episode 4
- Directed by: Rich Moore
- Written by: John Swartzwelder
- Production code: 8F03
- Original air date: October 10, 1991

Guest appearances
- Joe Mantegna as Fat Tony and himself playing Fat Tony; Phil Hartman as Troy McClure, Mobster and Lionel Hutz; Neil Patrick Harris as himself playing Bart Simpson; Marcia Wallace as Edna Krabappel

Episode features
- Chalkboard gag: (first) "High explosives and school don't mix"/(second) "I will not bribe Principal Skinner" (during the episode)
- Couch gag: The family forms a human pyramid with Maggie on top.
- Commentary: Matt Groening; James L. Brooks; Al Jean; Nancy Cartwright; Rich Moore

Episode chronology
← Previous "When Flanders Failed"	Next → "Homer Defined"
- The Simpsons season 3

"Bart the Murderer" is the fourth episode of the third season of the American animated television series The Simpsons. It originally aired on Fox in the United States on October 10, 1991. In the episode, Bart stumbles upon a Mafia-owned club. The owner of the bar, mobster Fat Tony, hires Bart as a bartender. When Principal Skinner goes missing after giving Bart detention, Bart is put on trial, accused of murdering Skinner.

The episode was written by John Swartzwelder and directed by Rich Moore. This episode marks the first appearances of recurring characters Fat Tony (Joe Mantegna) and his henchmen, Legs and Louie. The episode features cultural references to songs such as "Witchcraft" and "One Fine Day", the American television series MacGyver and the movies The Godfather, The Godfather Part II and Goodfellas.

Since airing, the episode has received mostly positive reviews from television critics. It acquired a Nielsen rating of 13.4 and was the highest-rated show on Fox the week it aired.

== Plot ==
After forgetting his permission slip at home, Bart misses out on a field trip to the chocolate factory and spends the day licking envelopes with Principal Skinner. On the way home, he loses control of his skateboard during a downpour and crashes down the stairwell of the Legitimate Businessman's Social Club, owned by the Springfield Mafia.

At the club, mob boss Fat Tony and his henchmen, Legs and Louie, are inhospitable towards Bart at first. They are soon impressed by his ability to pick winning horses and make excellent Manhattans. Fat Tony hires him as the club's bartender and errand boy, and Bart starts wearing Rat Pack suits and allows the Mob to store a truckload of stolen cigarettes in his bedroom until they can be fenced. After a news story about a hijacked truck of Laramie cigarettes, followed by Lisa questioning if Bart's boss is a crook, Bart starts to feel uneasy.

Bart is given detention for trying to bribe Principal Skinner, and is unable to attend his new workplace on time to serve Manhattans to a rival gang at a meeting. The mobsters confront Skinner, who is reported missing the next day. As it becomes apparent that Skinner has been murdered, Bart rushes to confront Fat Tony at the club after a nightmare about Skinner's ghost and his own execution. While Bart is there, the police raid the club and arrest the mobsters. Bart is subsequently placed on trial for Principal Skinner's murder.

At the trial, Fat Tony, Legs and Louie say Bart killed Skinner and that he is the kingpin of the Springfield mafia. Homer, when called to testify, finds the claims plausible. Bart is found guilty and Judge Snyder is about to give Bart a certain death sentence when Skinner, unshaven and disheveled, bursts into the courtroom, and explains to everyone what happened to him. Fat Tony and his henchmen visited Skinner's office and left sheepishly after Skinner scolded them for interfering in student discipline. When he returned home that day, Skinner became trapped beneath stacks of old newspapers in his garage and lay stuck there for a week before finally coming up with his own escape plan.

Bart is exonerated, despite the prosecution's unsuccessful attempt to have Skinner's speech stricken from the record. Bart quits Fat Tony's gang and tells him that the bromide is true: crime doesn't pay. The incident is the basis for a TV movie, Blood on the Blackboard: The Bart Simpson Story starring Richard Chamberlain as Skinner, Joe Mantegna as Fat Tony and Neil Patrick Harris as Bart. After learning the family won't receive royalties for the movie, Homer says he knows who the real crooks are: the Hollywood producers.

== Production ==
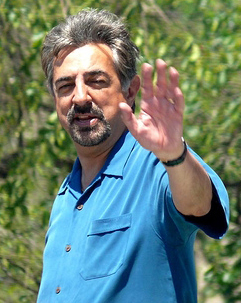
Joe Mantegna guest starred as Fat Tony.

The episode was written by John Swartzwelder and directed by Rich Moore. The writers conceived the idea of the episode before the 1990 film Goodfellas, which has a similar plot, was released. After it was, the writers incorporated references to the film in the episode. Fat Tony makes his first appearance on the show in this episode. He was modeled after Paul Sorvino's character Paul Cicero in GoodFellas.

The writers originally wanted Sheldon Leonard to voice Fat Tony, but they were unable to get him, so they went with Joe Mantegna instead. Mantegna was offered the role during the show's second season, and since he had seen the show before and thought it was "funny", he decided to give it a shot. He felt honored they had asked him. In an interview with The A.V. Club, Mantegna said he thinks the reason he got the role was partly due to his performance in the 1990 Mafia film The Godfather Part III, which had opened just prior to the offer. He thought the script was smart and clever, and he enjoyed recording it. Mantegna has since appeared many times on the show as Fat Tony; it is Mantegna's longest-running role in his acting career. Mantegna mused: "Who knew that Fat Tony was gonna resonate in the hearts and minds of the [Simpsons fans] out there? Apparently [the writers] got enough feedback as to how the character was liked that they wrote it in again and again, and I was kind of a recurring guy that they'd tap into at least a couple episodes a season." Mantegna even appeared as Fat Tony in The Simpsons Movie (2007).

Legs and Louie, Fat Tony's henchmen, also made their first appearances in this episode. The character of Louie was based on American actor Joe Pesci, who is known for playing violent mobsters. Neil Patrick Harris guest starred in the episode as himself, portraying Bart in the TV movie Blood on the Blackboard: The Bart Simpson Story. As a meta-joke, Mantegna plays Fat Tony in the movie.

== Cultural references ==
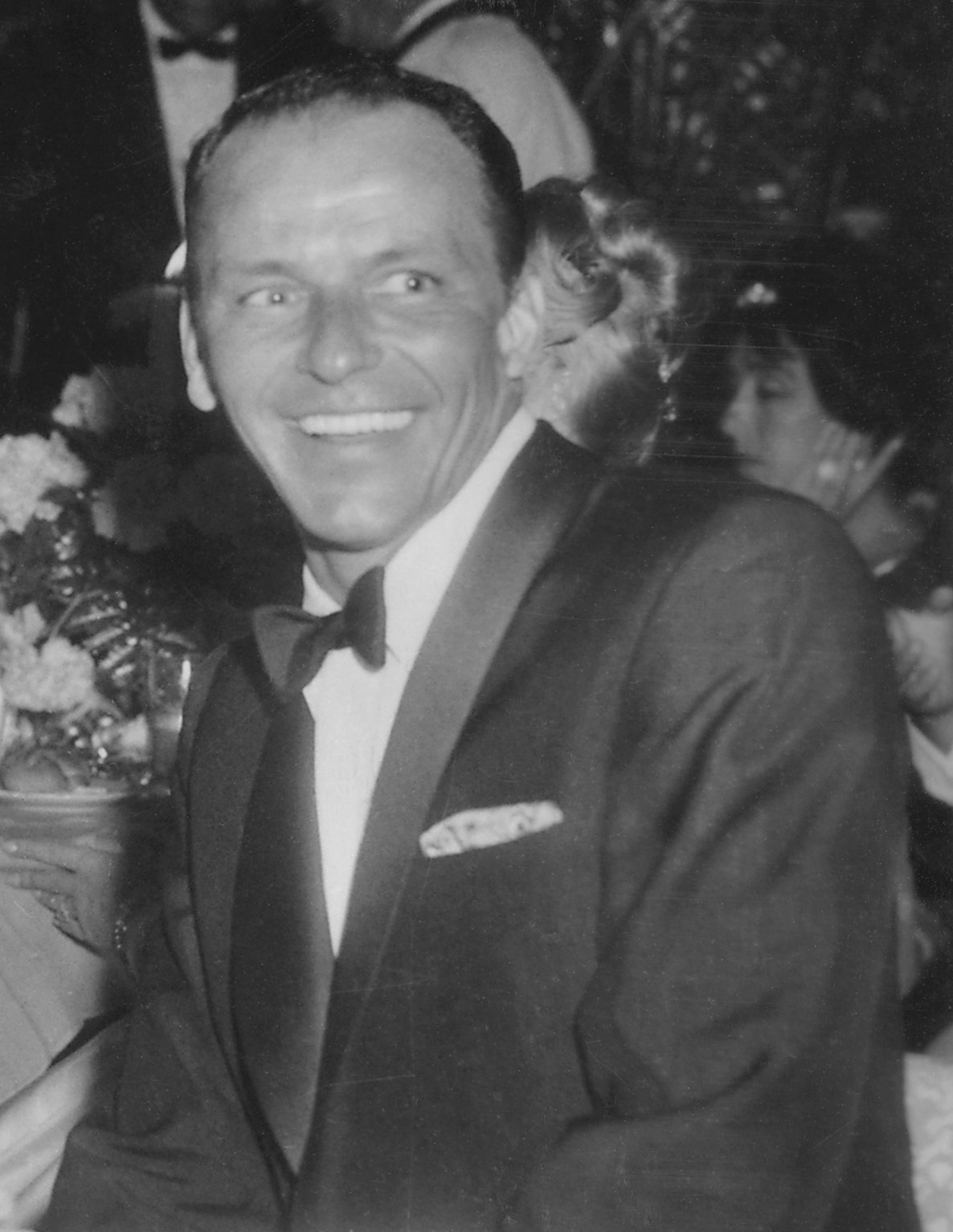
The song "Witchcraft" by Frank Sinatra is heard in the episode.

The scene where Lisa waves to Bart as he tries to get on the bus is a reference to The French Connection (1971). The Native American in the film at the chocolate factory is a parody of Chief Wahoo. The sequence of Bart crashing down the stairwell to the Mafia bar is similar to a scene in the film Goodfellas (1990), in which a young boy is employed by a Mafia as their messenger. All the horses in the race that Bart bets on are named after a famous animated character's catchphrase: "Sufferin' Succotash" (Sylvester the Cat), "Yabba Dabba Doo" (Fred Flintstone), "Ain't I a Stinker?" (Bugs Bunny), "That's All Folks" (Porky Pig), "I Yam What I Yam" (Popeye), and Bart's own "Eat my shorts" and "Don't have a cow".

The Chiffons's song "One Fine Day" is heard when Bart serves drinks to the mobsters during a game of poker. The writers originally wanted to use The Ronettes's "Be My Baby" for the scene, but they could not clear the copyrights for it. In his room, Bart stores the Springfield Mafia's loot—a truckload of cartons of Laramie cigarettes. While strutting around the kitchen, he sings Frank Sinatra's song "Witchcraft". The scene where Bart wakes up screaming after having a nightmare about Skinner is a reference to the scene in The Godfather (1972) where Jack Woltz screams after waking up with his horse's head by his side.

Fat Tony receiving "the Kiss of Death" from a mobster for serving a substandard Manhattan is a parody of Michael Corleone kissing his brother Fredo after discovering his betrayal in The Godfather Part II (1974). When Legs testifies against Bart in court, a chart of photographs displays Bart as the head of a crime family, reminiscent of the chart displaying "The Michael Corleone Family" during the Senate Hearing Committee sequences in The Godfather Part II. Skinner frees himself from being trapped under the newspapers in a way similar to Angus MacGyver's escapes in the American TV series MacGyver.

== Reception ==
In its original American broadcast, "Bart the Murderer" finished 31st in the ratings for the week of October 7–13, 1991, with a Nielsen rating of 13.4, equivalent to approximately 12.5 million viewing households. It was the highest-rated show on Fox that week.

Since airing, the episode has received mostly positive reviews from television critics. John Orvted of Vanity Fair named it the eighth best episode of The Simpsons because of the "inspired" Mafia satire and because it "goes deeper into Bart's ongoing conflict with authority figures." Gary Russell and Gareth Roberts, the authors of the book I Can't Believe It's a Bigger and Better Updated Unofficial Simpsons Guide, praised the scene in which Skinner explains his disappearance to the courtroom, calling it Skinner's "finest hour" on the show. Nate Meyers of Digitally Obsessed named the episode the best in the third season, and commented that there are "many priceless moments" in it, such as Homer's meeting with the Springfield Mafia. Meyers also praised Swartzwelder's script. In his only interview to date, Swartzwelder himself listed "Bart the Murderer" as among his favorite Simpsons episodes that he had written.

Bill Gibron of DVD Verdict noted how an episode that starts with Bart's having a bad day can lead to his being tried for murder as the head of the local Mafia "is just one of the amazing monuments to this show's superiority." DVD Movie Guide's Colin Jacobson thought "Bart the Murderer" was season three's first "truly great" episode because it "starts off strong and gets even better as it moves." Even though he thinks Mafia parodies have been overused, Jacobson thought this one brought "a fresh approach and remains consistently amusing. A great guest spot from Mantegna helps. It also feels like the first episode of this season that really moves the series ahead; it seems like something a little more incisive than most of what came before it." Andy Patrizio of IGN called "Bart the Murderer" his favorite of the season, and praised the episode for its references to The Godfather and MacGyver. The episode's reference to Goodfellas was named the 28th greatest film reference in the history of the show by Total Film's Nathan Ditum.
