= Lisa's Pony =

- The Simpsons episode
- Episode no.: Season 3 Episode 8
- Directed by: Carlos Baeza
- Written by: Al Jean; Mike Reiss
- Production code: 8F06
- Original air date: November 7, 1991

Guest appearance
- Frank Welker as Princess the pony

Episode features
- Chalkboard gag: "'Bart Bucks' are not legal tender"
- Couch gag: Homer gets on the couch first and lies down. The rest of the family arrive and sit on him. Homer flails his arms.
- Commentary: Matt Groening; James L. Brooks; Al Jean; Dan Castellaneta; Julie Kavner; David Silverman; Mike Reiss

Episode chronology
← Previous "Treehouse of Horror II"	Next → "Saturdays of Thunder"
- The Simpsons season 3

"Lisa's Pony" is the eighth episode of the third season of the American animated television series The Simpsons. It originally aired on Fox in the United States on November 7, 1991. In this episode, Homer goes drinking at Moe's Tavern instead of buying a new reed for Lisa's saxophone, making her flop at the school talent show. Desperate to win back his daughter's love, Homer gives Lisa the one thing she has always wanted: a pony. Homer struggles with two jobs to cover the cost of sheltering and feeding it. After seeing the sacrifices he endures to pay for it, Lisa decides to part with her pony.

The episode was written by Al Jean and Mike Reiss and directed by Carlos Baeza. Lunchlady Doris, a recurring character on The Simpsons, made her debut in this episode. "Lisa's Pony" features cultural references to films such as The Godfather and 2001: A Space Odyssey the comic strip Little Nemo in Slumberland, and the Chuck Berry song "My Ding-a-Ling".

Since airing, the episode has received positive reviews from television critics. It acquired a Nielsen rating of 13.8 and was the highest-rated show on Fox the week it aired.

== Plot ==
Lisa needs a new saxophone reed for the school talent show. Homer agrees to buy her one but visits Moe's Tavern first. When he arrives at the music shop next door, it has closed for the night. Dejected, Homer returns to the bar, where he finds the shop's owner, Jerry, sitting next to him. Moe convinces Jerry to re-open his store (to return the favor since Moe saved him and his wife from their burning car), but when Homer reaches the school with the new reed, Lisa has already butchered her performance. Humiliated and dejected, she ignores her father's attempts to appease her. While watching old family videos, Homer realizes how much he has neglected Lisa over the years.

After Homer's attempts to mend his relationship with Lisa fail, he takes out a loan through the power plant credit union and buys her the one thing she has always wanted: a pony. Lisa wakes one morning – the pony is lying next to her in bed. She is delighted with her and names her Princess; she forgives her father. Homer is glad Lisa respects him again, but Marge is upset when he ignores her warning that they cannot afford the horse.

To pay for Princess' stabling, Homer moonlights at the Kwik-E-Mart, which exhausts him over time. Marge tells the children about the sacrifices their father is making but says that Lisa must decide for herself whether to part with Princess. After watching Bart take advantage of a sleep-deprived Homer at the Kwik-E-Mart, Lisa shares a heartbreaking goodbye with her pony, and tells Homer there is a "big dumb animal" she loves even more than Princess: her father. When Homer quits his job at the Kwik-E-Mart, Apu admits that Homer — despite being lazy, stealing, and being rude to the customers — was the best employee he has ever had.

== Production ==
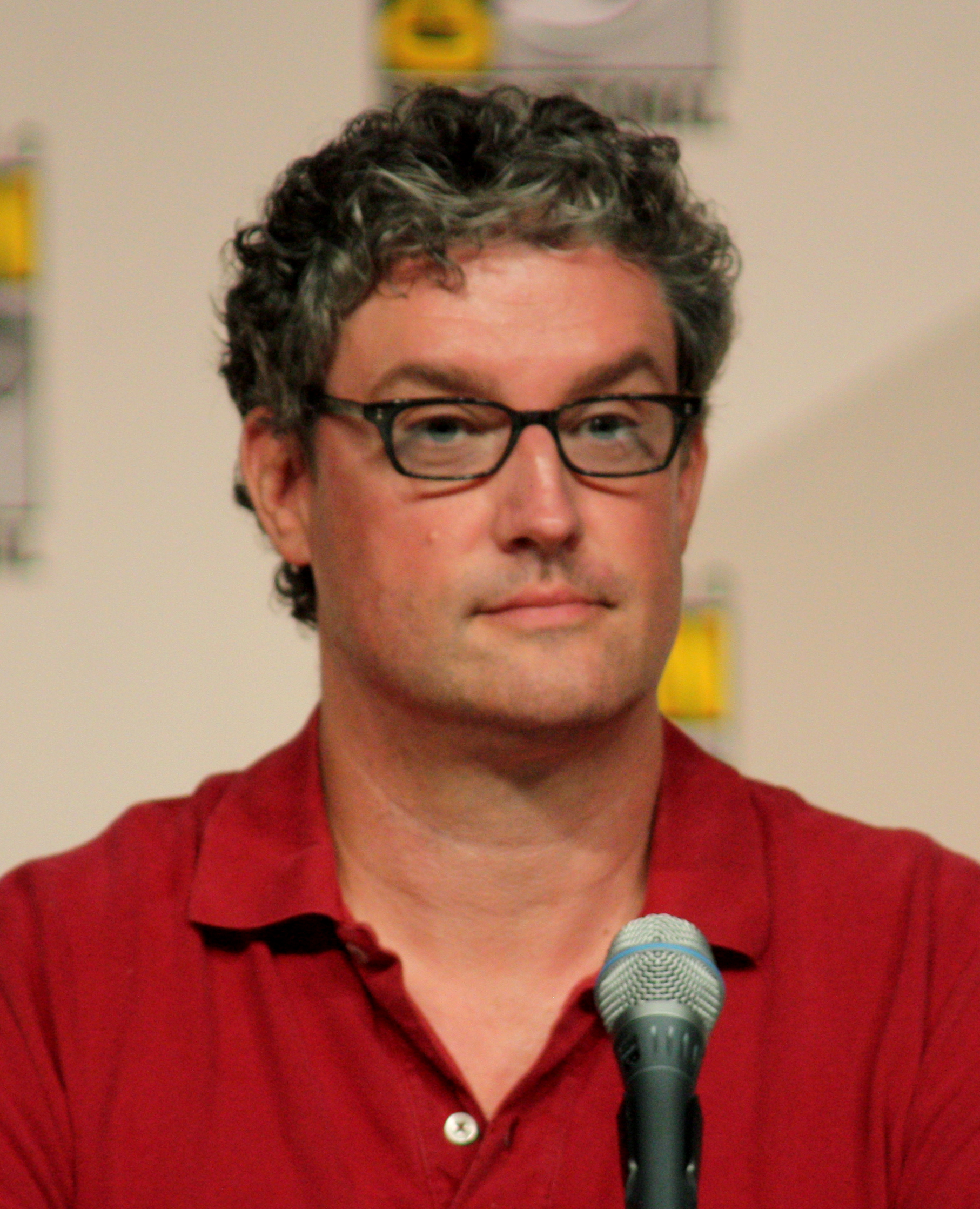
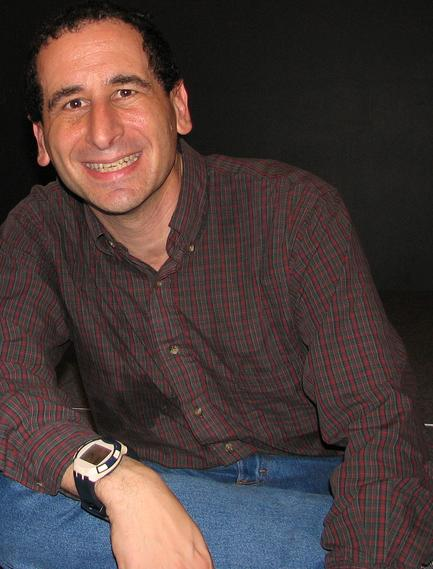
The Simpsons show runners Al Jean (left) and Mike Reiss (right) wrote the episode.

"Lisa's Pony" was written by Al Jean and Mike Reiss, who were show runners of The Simpsons when the episode was produced. According to Reiss, being a show runner is a stressful job as he has to supervise all the processes the episodes go through. Jean and Reiss were working approximately 80–100 hours a week when they were assigned to write an episode on top of their regular job. "Lisa's Pony" was written between 10.00 p.m. and 1.00 a.m. every night after they had finished their 12- to 14-hour workday. They came up with idea for it while going through a list of Lisa's interests, and Jean told Reiss, "Lisa likes ponies; we [should] give her a pony." While writing down ideas for the story, they decided to explore the consequences of having a pony in a suburban house.

Carlos Baeza served as animation director for the episode. The Simpsons creator Matt Groening said animating horses is "the most difficult thing to do". The animators used Eadweard Muybridge's famous animation of a horse galloping and other photo references as models for Princess. In the talent show scene, Lisa is lit up by a spotlight when she performs with her saxophone. After the episode came back from the animation studio in Korea, the staff noticed the light was colored blue, making Lisa look like "a Smurf". The scene had to be re-animated in the United States, and the spotlight effect was reduced.

The woman who sells the pony to Homer is based on actress Katharine Hepburn. Cast member Tress MacNeille provided the voice for the character. Lunch Lady Doris, a recurring character on The Simpsons, made her first appearance on the show in this episode as one of the judges in the talent show. She was voiced by the show's script supervisor Doris Grau, who had a "beautiful, tobacco-cured voice" the staff thought was perfect for the role. Following Grau's death in 1995, the characters she voiced were retired out of respect, with the exception of Lunch Lady Doris, who stayed on the show without speaking roles until 2006.

== Cultural references ==
The beginning of the episode, in which Homer has a dream of himself as an ape, is a reference to the Dawn of Man sequence in the 1968 science fiction film 2001: A Space Odyssey. The Simpsons director David Silverman had difficulties with making the ape resemble Homer and struggled with the design for several hours. Lisa plays "Stormy Weather" at the talent show and later plays "Wildfire" for Princess. After hurting Lisa's feelings at the talent show, Homer watches old home movies of him and Lisa, including one in which a young Homer is seen watching Fantasy Island on television instead of paying attention to Lisa's taking her first steps. The scene in which Lisa wakes up in her bed and discovers the pony lying next to her is a reference to a scene in The Godfather, in which Jack Woltz awakens to discover the severed head of his favorite horse placed in his bed. The chords used in the score are the same as Nino Rota's for the film but shortened. While driving home from the Kwik-E-Mart, Homer falls asleep behind the wheel and dreams that he is in Slumberland, drawn in the style of Winsor McCay's Little Nemo in Slumberland. An instrumental cover version of The Beatles song "Golden Slumbers" plays during the sequence.

One of the children at the talent show performs the song "My Ding-a-Ling" by Chuck Berry. According to Jean, it was a "huge difficulty" to clear the rights for the song so it could be used on the show. John Boylan, who produced the album The Simpsons Sing the Blues, personally appealed to Berry to clear the song for them. The lyrics to "My Ding-a-Ling", with their heavy innuendo, caused many radio stations to ban the song. This is parodied in the episode when Principal Skinner rushes the child off the stage before he is able to finish the first line of the refrain. The man who owns the music shop Homer visits is based on actor Wally Cox.

== Reception ==
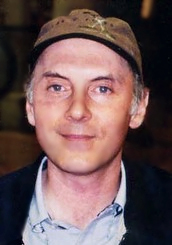
Dan Castellaneta won an Emmy for his performance in this episode.

In its original American broadcast, "Lisa's Pony" finished 35th in the ratings for the week of November 4–10, 1991, with a Nielsen rating of 13.8, equivalent to approximately 12.7 million viewing households. It was the highest-rated show on Fox that week. "Lisa's Pony" was released with the episode "Treehouse of Horror II" on a VHS collection in 1999, called Best of the Simpsons. Homer's voice actor, Dan Castellaneta, received a Primetime Emmy Award for Outstanding Voice-Over Performance in 1992 for his performance in the episode.

Since airing, the episode has received positive reviews from television critics. Niel Harvey of The Roanoke Times called the episode a "classic bit of Simpsonia," and The Baltimore Sun's Kevin Valkenburg named it one of the "truly classic" The Simpsons episodes. The authors of the book I Can't Believe It's a Bigger and Better Updated Unofficial Simpsons Guide, Gary Russell and Gareth Roberts, called the episode "good stuff" and praised the "nice flashbacks to Lisa as a baby". Cinema Blend's Bryce Wilson called "Lisa's Pony" one of the best Lisa episodes, and added that the only words to describe it are "funny as hell". Nate Meyers of Digitally Obsessed rated the episode a 5 (of 5), praising it for its references to The Godfather and 2001: A Space Odyssey which "film buffs will find uproarious". Meyers added that Homer's and Lisa's relationship is "the heart of the episode, showing Homer to be more than just a brute".

The episode's reference to The Godfather was named the seventh greatest film reference in the history of the show by Total Film's Nathan Ditum. The Star-Ledger named this episode's reference to 2001: A Space Odyssey one of their favorite references to Stanley Kubrick on The Simpsons. The Guardian's David Eklid said episodes such as "Lisa's Pony" and "Stark Raving Dad" make season three "pretty much [the] best season of any television show, ever". Molly Griffin of The Observer commented that "Lisa's Pony" is one of the third season's episodes that "make the show into the cultural force it is today". Bill Gibron of DVD Verdict said "Lisa's Pony" is a "priceless part" of the show because of its "meshing of old storylines with new experiences, combined with some of the best jokes in the series". Gibron gave the episode a perfect score of 100.

DVD Movie Guide's Colin Jacobson, however, gave the episode a less positive review, commenting episodes "in which Homer has to redeem himself to others aren't a rarity, and 'Lisa's Pony' falls in the middle of that genre's pack. Homer's escapades at the Kwik-E-Mart definitely add life to the proceedings, and some of his other antics make the show good. I like 'Lisa's Pony' but don't consider it to offer a great program." According to Greg Suarez of The Digital Bits, "Lisa's Pony" is considered a fan favorite. In a list of the show's top 10 episodes, compiled by the webmaster of the fan site The Simpsons Archive and published by USA Today, this episode was listed in seventh place. Paul Cantor, a professor of English at the University of Virginia, utilized "Lisa's Pony" as an example that The Simpsons does not promote negative morals and values, which some critics have criticized the show for.
