= Laramie (cigarette) =

American cigarette brand

Laramie cigarette tubes package

Laramie was a brand of cigarettes extant in the United States from the 1930s into the 1950s. Later, the name was used for a cigarette rolling kit. Laramie is currently a brand name for cigarette papers and cigarette tubes (rolling papers pre-formed into a tube, for use in home tobacco injector systems) marketed by HBI International.

== In popular culture ==
Although they have been out of production since the 1950s, Laramie cigarettes have appeared on The Simpsons. In the episode "Lisa the Beauty Queen", they sponsor a child beauty pageant and have a corporate mascot named Menthol Moose, who can be seen at parades in Springfield. Laramie has also appeared in The Practice (season one, episode four), during a storyline about a tobacco lawsuit. In the episode "Soft Light" of The X-Files, Laramie Tobacco is mentioned as a missing person's former workplace. Laramie was also the brand name used for cigarettes in the 1999 sci-fi horror game System Shock 2, but the packaging design resembled that of Marlboro; similar to the fictional Morley brand in many films and shows.

== See also ==
- List of rolling papers
