= One Fish, Two Fish, Blowfish, Blue Fish =

- The Simpsons episode
- Episode no.: Season 2 Episode 11
- Directed by: Wes Archer
- Written by: Nell Scovell
- Production code: 7F11
- Original air date: January 24, 1991

Guest appearances
- Joey Miyashima as Toshiro; Diane Tanaka as Hostess; Larry King as himself; Sab Shimono as Master Chef; George Takei as Akira

Episode features
- Chalkboard gag: "I will not cut corners", followed by ditto marks.
- Couch gag: The couch tips over backwards and Maggie pops up from behind it.
- Commentary: Matt Groening; Nell Scovell; Al Jean; Mike Reiss

Episode chronology
← Previous "Bart Gets Hit by a Car"	Next → "The Way We Was"
- The Simpsons season 2

"One Fish, Two Fish, Blowfish, Blue Fish" is the eleventh episode of the second season of the American animated television series The Simpsons. It originally aired on Fox in the United States on January 24, 1991. In the episode, Homer consumes a poisonous fugu fish at a sushi restaurant and is told he has less than 24 hours to live. He accepts his fate and tries to do everything on his bucket list before he dies.

This episode was written by Nell Scovell and directed by Wes Archer. It features guest appearances from Joey Miyashima, Diane Tanaka, Larry King, George Takei, Sab Shimono. The episode was selected for release in a video collection of selected episodes, titled The Last Temptation of Homer, which was released November 9, 1998. The episode features cultural references to songs such as "Theme from Shaft", "Gypsys, Tramps & Thieves", and "When the Saints Go Marching In".

Since airing, the episode has received mostly positive reviews from television critics. It acquired a Nielsen rating of 14.1, and was the highest-rated show on Fox the week it aired.

== Plot ==
During dinner one evening, Lisa expresses her boredom with eating the same meals so repeatedly so Marge suggests the family try the new sushi restaurant in town. Despite being initially skeptical, Homer works his way through most of the menu and then orders sushi made from fugu, a deadly poisonous pufferfish. Despite being warned of its potential lethality, Homer demands it anyway. While the master chef is making out with Edna Krabappel behind the restaurant, it falls to an apprentice to prepare the fish and remove its toxic organs, a process Homer interrupts out of impatience, leading him to cut it off-point. After Homer swallows the sushi, the chef has the waiter Akira warn him he may have been poisoned.

At the hospital, Dr. Hibbert informs Homer and Marge that Homer likely has only 22 hours to live if he has consumed the venom of the fugu. That night, Homer tells Marge he will refrain from telling Bart and Lisa the bad news. He makes a list of things he wants to do before he dies.

After oversleeping on his last day, Homer attempts to tackle the things on his list. He has a man-to-man talk with Bart, listens to Lisa play her saxophone, and borrows Ned's camcorder to make a video of himself for Maggie to watch when she is older. Homer reconciles with his father, Abe, which takes up far more time than he expects and forces him to skip some of the other things on his list.

When arrested for speeding, Homer demands officers Lou and Eddie write him a ticket, thinking he will avoid the fine by dying. The officers are rankled by Homer's snarky attitude and throw him in a police cell. After Barney pays his bail to Chief Wiggum, Homer insults his boss, Mr. Burns, and has a last drink at Moe's Tavern, causing him to miss dinner with his family. He hurries home in time to say goodbye to his children and "snuggle" with Marge.

At midnight, Homer quietly leaves his bed and bids each family member goodbye while they sleep. He sits glumly in the living room listening to Larry King read the Bible on tape. The next morning, Marge finds Homer collapsed in the armchair, realizes that his drool is still warm, and wakes him to joyfully inform him he is still alive. Realizing that he hasn't consumed the venom of the fugu, Homer happily celebrates and vows to live life to its fullest. He resumes his life, watching a televised bowling tournament while eating pork rinds.

== Production ==
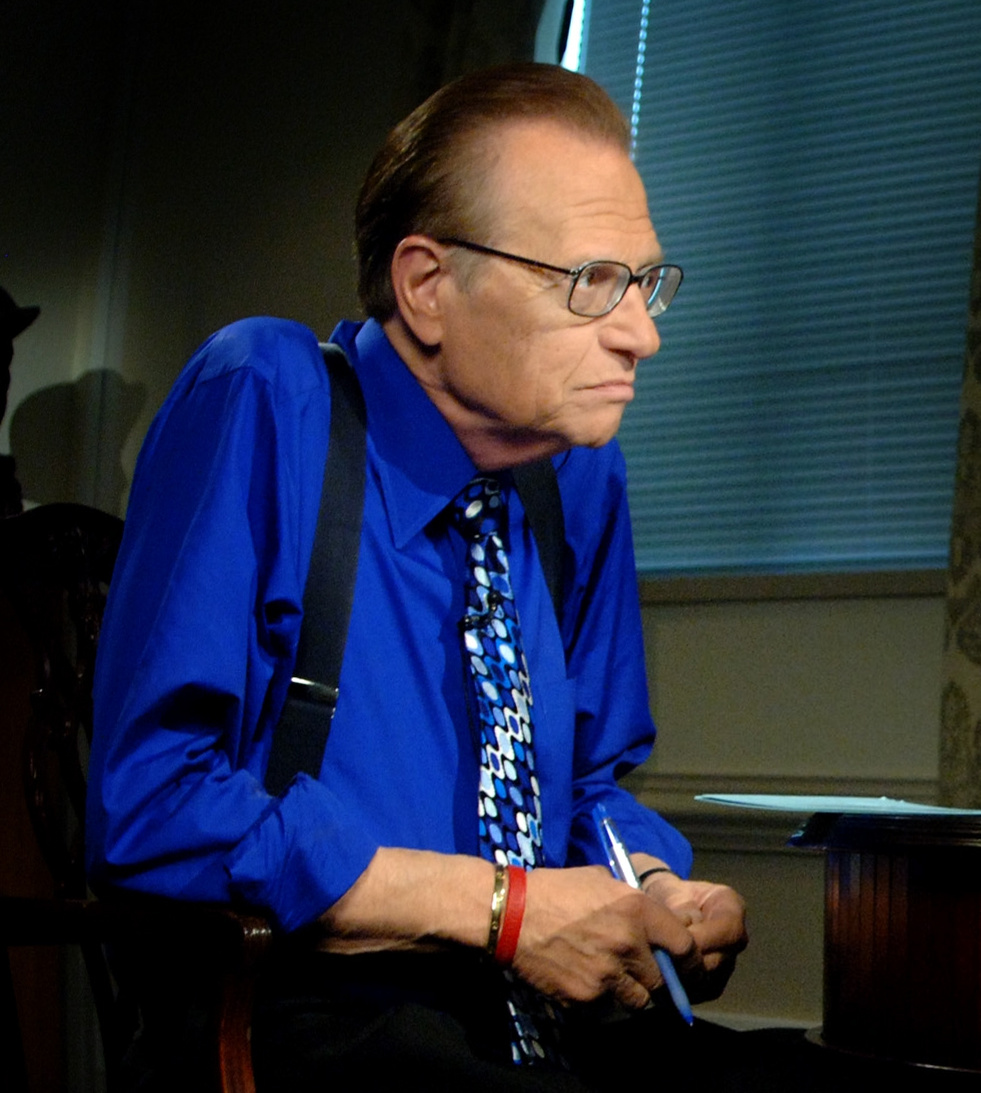
Larry King guest starred in the episode as himself.

The episode was written by Nell Scovell and directed by Wes Archer. In the episode, Bart and Lisa sneak into the sushi bar's karaoke room and sing the theme song to the 1971 film Shaft, "Theme from Shaft". The Fox network censors originally did not want the staff to use the song because they thought the lyrics were too obscene for television. In order to prove the censors wrong and show that it could appear on television, the staff dug up footage from an old Academy Awards ceremony at which the song was performed by Isaac Hayes.

When the chef at the sushi bar finds out Homer has been poisoned, he yells at his apprentices in Japanese. The staff wanted the language they spoke to be actual Japanese, so they hired a Japanese actor who translated the lines for them. The episode introduced the character Akira, who has appeared many times later on the show. George Takei provided the voice of Akira, although the character was voiced in later episodes by Hank Azaria. The episode featured many other guest appearances; Larry King as himself; Sab Shimono as the sushi bar chef; Joey Miyashima as Toshiro, the apprentice chef who slices up the fugu; and Diane Tanaka as the hostess of the bar. According to showrunner Sam Simon, Takei's Star Trek: The Original Series co-star William Shatner rejected the role of the narrator of the Bible which eventually went to King.

"One Fish, Two Fish, Blowfish, Blue Fish" originally aired on the Fox network in the United States on January 24, 1991. The episode was selected for release in a video collection of selected episodes, titled The Last Temptation of Homer, which was released on November 9, 1998. Other episodes included in the collection set were "Colonel Homer", "Homer Alone", and "Simpson and Delilah". The episode was again included in the 2005 DVD release of the Last Temptation of Homer set. It was also released in May 1998 on the seventh volume of the Best of The Simpsons video collection, together with "Bart Gets Hit by a Car". The episode was later included on The Simpsons season two DVD set; released on August 6, 2002. Scovell, Matt Groening, Al Jean, and Mike Reiss participated in the DVD's audio commentary.

== Cultural references ==
The episode name is a parody of One Fish Two Fish Red Fish Blue Fish by Dr. Seuss. The sushi bar that the Simpson family visits is located on a street called Elm Street, a reference to the A Nightmare on Elm Street film franchise. In the karaoke room, a gentleman introduces himself as Richie Sakai, a reference to a producer on The Simpsons with the same name. He proceeds to sing the 1971 song "Gypsys, Tramps & Thieves" by Cher. Homer sings his own version of the gospel hymn "When the Saints Go Marching In" while listening to Lisa playing her saxophone one last time. When Homer arrives at his home after leaving Moe's Tavern, he hammers on one of the windows of the house and shouts Marge's name. This is a reference to the 1967 film The Graduate, in which Ben Braddock (Dustin Hoffman) does the same and runs to the church, pounds on the window, and yells "Elaine! Elaine!" As Homer awaits his death, he listens to Larry King read the Bible on tape. King says he thinks the San Antonio Spurs will win the NBA title that year (in real life, the Chicago Bulls would win their first of six titles in 1991).

== Reception ==
In its original broadcast, "One Fish, Two Fish, Blowfish, Blue Fish" finished twenty-seventh in the ratings for the week of January 21–27, 1991, with a Nielsen rating of 14.1, equivalent to thirteen million viewing households. It was the highest-rated show on Fox that week.

Since airing, the episode has received mostly positive reviews from television critics. DVD Movie Guide's Colin Jacobson said that despite a "potentially gimmicky tone", the episode provided "a lot of fun moments along with a little emotional content as well. The show usually balanced sentimentality cleanly, and that occurred here; it avoided becoming too syrupy and featured just enough emotion to make an impact. It also contained some great bits, like Bart's and Lisa's karaoke performance of the 'Theme from Shaft'. It also ended on a hilarious and incisive note." Jacobson's favorite line of the episode was the sushi restaurant hostess' "This is our karaoke bar. Now it is empty, but soon it will be hopping with drunken Japanese businessmen."

The authors of the book I Can't Believe It's a Bigger and Better Updated Unofficial Simpsons Guide, Gary Russell and Gareth Roberts, wrote: "Again, a playful dig at racial stereotypes. Homer comes over as a reasonable man who wants to live his last day in style, and the closing twist is easily as good as the farewells leading up to it." Jeremy Kleinman of DVD Talk said the episode is "rich with sentimentality and Homer's expression of love for his family as he fears that his time is up." He also commented that while all the chalkboard gags on the show are "funny", this episode "features a true gem" as Bart writes "I will not cut corners" once and then puts ditto marks below.

Ed Potton of The Times wrote: "The writers offer black humour by the bucketload, but the grim reality of Homer's fate is never in doubt; his eventual collapse is deeply affecting. A great example of [the show's] fierce satire being offset by a potent emotional core." Doug Pratt, a DVD reviewer and Rolling Stone contributor, said the first half of the episode has "fun skewering Japanese restaurants and such, while the second half is reasonably successful at emphasizing character while sustaining the comedy." In a review of the second season, Bryce Wilson of Cinema Blend commented: "The worst moments of this season are merely uninspired, never truly horrible. Slight misses like 'Dancin' Homer', 'One Fish, Two Fish, Blowfish, Blue Fish', 'Bart's Dog Gets an "F"', and 'The War of the Simpsons' are a bit flat. But even in their lowest points, humor is easy to find."

Jeremy Roebuck of KVUE named this episode among the best Simpsons episodes with a religious theme, along with "Bart Sells His Soul", "Homer the Heretic", "Simpsons Bible Stories", and "She of Little Faith". Dawn Taylor of The DVD Journal thought Homer's line (to Bart) was the best line of the episode: "I want to share something with you, the three little sentences that will get you through life. Number one: 'Cover for me.' Number two: 'Oh, good idea, boss.' Number three, 'It was like that when I got here.'" Screen Rant called it the best episode of the second season.
