= The Simpsons season 2 =

Season of television series

The Simpsons
- Season 2
- DVD cover featuring the Simpsons family with swapped heads sitting on their couch watching television inside a TV
- Showrunners: James L. Brooks; Matt Groening; Sam Simon
- No. of episodes: 22

Release
- Original network: Fox
- Original release: October 11, 1990 – July 11, 1991

Season chronology
- ← Previous; Season 1 Next → Season 3

The second season of the American animated sitcom The Simpsons aired on Fox between October 11, 1990, and July 11, 1991. It began with "Bart Gets an "F". Another episode, "Blood Feud", aired during the summer after the official season finale. The executive producers for the second production season were Matt Groening, James L. Brooks, and Sam Simon, who had also been executive producers for the previous season. The DVD box set was released on August 6, 2002, in Region 1, July 8, 2002 in Region 2 and in September 2002 in Region 4. The episode "Homer vs. Lisa and the 8th Commandment" won the Primetime Emmy Award for Outstanding Animated Program (for Programming Less Than One Hour), and was also nominated in the "Outstanding Sound Mixing for a Comedy Series or a Special" category.

== Production ==
"Two Cars in Every Garage and Three Eyes on Every Fish" was the first episode produced for the season, but "Bart Gets an 'F'" aired first because Bart was popular at the time and the producers had wanted to premiere with a Bart-themed episode. The second season featured a new opening sequence, which was shortened from its original length of roughly 90 seconds. The opening sequence for the first season showed Bart stealing a "Bus Stop" sign; whilst the new sequence featured him skateboarding past several characters who had been introduced during the previous season. Starting with this season, there were three versions of the opening: a full roughly 75-second version, a 45-second version and a 25-second version. This gave the show's editors more leeway. This sequence would remain in use until the show's transfer to high definition midway through the twentieth season.

Mark Kirkland and Jim Reardon received their first directorial credits on the show while Jeff Martin and David M. Stern joined the writing staff.

== Voice cast & characters ==
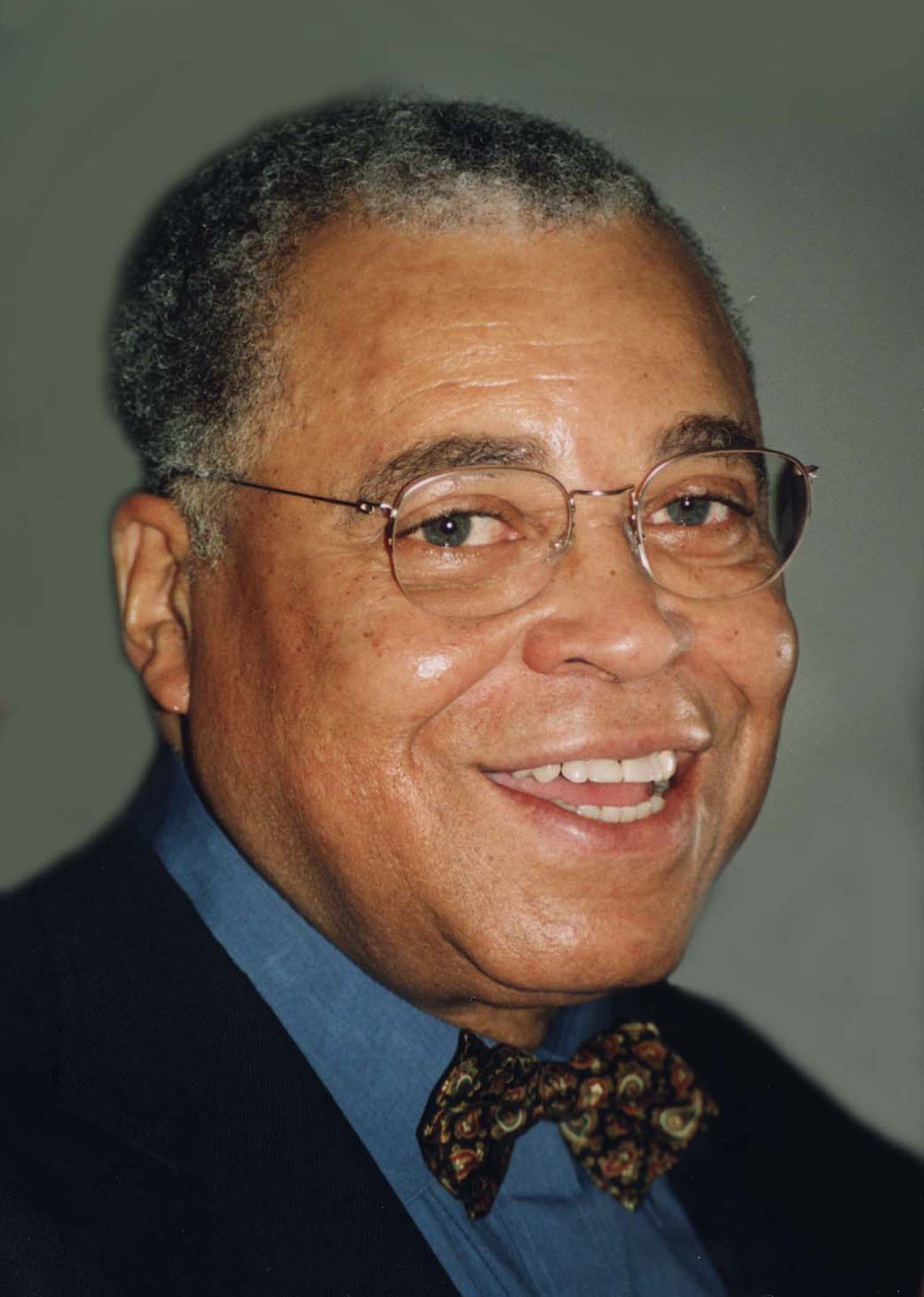
James Earl Jones guest-starred in the inaugural "Treehouse of Horror" episode

The season saw the introduction of several new recurring characters, including Mayor Quimby, Kang and Kodos, Maude Flanders, Bill and Marty, Dr. Hibbert, Roger Meyers Jr., Sideshow Mel, Lionel Hutz, Dr. Nick Riviera, Blue-Haired Lawyer, Rainier Wolfcastle, Troy McClure, Groundskeeper Willie, Hans Moleman, Professor Frink, Snake and Comic Book Guy.

=== Main cast ===
- Dan Castellaneta as Homer Simpson, Grampa Simpson, Krusty the Clown, Mayor Quimby, Groundskeeper Willie, Barney Gumble, Troy McClure and various others
- Julie Kavner as Marge Simpson, Patty Bouvier, Selma Bouvier and various others
- Nancy Cartwright as Bart Simpson, Nelson Muntz, Ralph Wiggum and various others
- Yeardley Smith as Lisa Simpson
- Hank Azaria as Moe Szyslak, Chief Wiggum, Professor Frink, Carl Carlson, Comic Book Guy, Apu and various others
- Harry Shearer as Mr. Burns, Waylon Smithers, Ned Flanders, Principal Skinner, Dr. Hibbert, Lenny Leonard, Kent Brockman, Reverend Lovejoy, and various others

=== Recurring ===
- Pamela Hayden as Milhouse Van Houten, Jimbo Jones
- Maggie Roswell as Maude Flanders, Helen Lovejoy and Miss Hoover
- Russi Taylor as Martin Prince and Sherri and Terri
- Tress MacNeille as Agnes Skinner
- Marcia Wallace as Edna Krabappel
- Jo Ann Harris as additional characters

=== Guest stars ===
- Phil Hartman as Troy McClure, Lionel Hutz, Moses, Plato and various others (various episodes)
- Harvey Fierstein as Karl ("Simpson and Delilah")
- James Earl Jones as the mover, Serak the Preparer, and the narrator of "The Raven" ("Treehouse of Horror")
- Tony Bennett as himself ("Dancin' Homer")
- Tom Poston as the Capital City Goofball ("Dancin' Homer")
- Daryl L. Coley as "Bleeding Gums" Murphy ("Dancin' Homer")
- Ken Levine as Dan Horde ("Dancin' Homer")
- Greg Berg as Rory ("Bart vs. Thanksgiving")
- Carol Kane as Maggie Simpson ("Bart vs. Thanksgiving"; uncredited)
- Alex Rocco as Roger Meyers Jr. ("Itchy & Scratchy & Marge")
- Joey Miyashima as Toshiro ("One Fish, Two Fish, Blowfish, Blue Fish")
- Diane Tanaka as Hostess ("One Fish, Two Fish, Blowfish, Blue Fish")
- Larry King as himself ("One Fish, Two Fish, Blowfish, Blue Fish")
- Sab Shimono as Master Chef ("One Fish, Two Fish, Blowfish, Blue Fish")
- George Takei as Akira ("One Fish, Two Fish, Blowfish, Blue Fish")
- Jon Lovitz as Artie Ziff ("The Way We Was"), Professor Lombardo and the doughnut delivery man ("Brush with Greatness")
- Danny DeVito as Herb Powell ("Oh Brother, Where Art Thou?")
- Tracey Ullman as Emily Winthrop and Sylvia Winfield ("Bart's Dog Gets an "F"")
- Frank Welker as animal voices ("Bart's Dog Gets an "F"")
- Audrey Meadows as Beatrice "Bea" Simmons ("Old Money")
- Ringo Starr as himself ("Brush with Greatness")
- Dustin Hoffman (credited as Sam Etic) as Mr. Bergstrom ("Lisa's Substitute")
- Cloris Leachman as Mrs. Glick ("Three Men and a Comic Book")
- Daniel Stern as the adult version of Bart ("Three Men and a Comic Book")

== Reception ==
=== Ratings ===
Due to the show's success during its abbreviated first season, Fox decided to move The Simpsons from its Sunday night lineup on August 23, 1990. The move came as the still-fledgling network was adding two additional nights of programming to its lineup, one of which was Thursday. Fox placed The Simpsons in the leadoff position of their lineup for their initial Thursday offerings, with the new sitcom Babes and a new Aaron Spelling-produced drama, Beverly Hills, 90210, offering competition for the lineups fielded by the other networks including ratings champion NBC.

The Simpsons settled into the 8:00 PM position, which put it in direct competition with the five-time defending #1 show in all of television, The Cosby Show. Many of the producers, including James L. Brooks, were against the move because The Simpsons had been in the top 10 while airing on Sunday and they felt the move would destroy its ratings. All through the summer of 1990, several news outlets published stories about the supposed "Bill vs. Bart" rivalry. At the time, NBC had 208 television stations, while Fox had only 133.

Bart Gets an "F" was the first episode to air against The Cosby Show and averaged an 18.4 Nielsen rating and 29% of the audience. In the week's ratings, it finished tied for eighth behind The Cosby Show which had an 18.5 rating. However, an estimated 33.6 million viewers watched the episode, making it the number one show in terms of actual viewers that week. At the time, it was the most watched episode in the history of Fox. The next week, "Simpson and Delilah" had a 16.2 rating and 25% share while the Cosby Show managed to maintain its 18.5 rating. However, viewer-wise, The Simpsons won again with 29.9 million viewers.

The next week, "Treehouse of Horror" fell in the ratings, finishing 24th. Ratings wise, new episodes of The Cosby Show beat The Simpsons every time during the second season and The Simpsons eventually fell out of the top 10.

"Three Men and a Comic Book" would boast the only victory over The Cosby Show, finishing 23rd in the weekly ratings while a rerun of Cosby finished 26th. At the end of the season, Cosby averaged as the fifth highest rated show on television while The Simpsons was 38th. It would not be until the seventeenth episode of the third season, "Homer at the Bat," that The Simpsons would beat The Cosby Show in the ratings. The show remained in its Thursday timeslot until the sixth season.

=== Critical response ===
The second season of The Simpsons received critical acclaim. On Rotten Tomatoes, the season has a 100% approval rating based on 8 critical reviews. On aggregate review website Metacritic, a site which uses a weighted mean score, the season scored a 92/100 based on seven critics, indicating "universal acclaim".

At the 7th annual Television Critics Association Awards, the second season of the show was nominated for "Outstanding Achievement in Comedy" but lost to Murphy Brown.

== Episodes ==
No. overall	No. in season	Title	Directed by	Written by	Original release date	Prod. code	U.S. viewers (millions)
14	1	"Bart Gets an 'F'"	David Silverman	David M. Stern	October 11, 1990	7F03	33.6
Bart fails a test and is told he has one more chance to pass it or else he will be held back a year. Bart tries to get the class genius Martin Prince to help him, but after that fails, Bart prays for help. That night, Springfield is hit with a massive blizzard and the school is closed, giving Bart one more day to study. Despite his desperate attempts, Bart fails the test again. While crying, he mentions an obscure historical event and Mrs. Krabappel, noting that he applied practical knowledge, passes him.
15	2	"Simpson and Delilah"	Rich Moore	Jon Vitti	October 18, 1990	7F02	29.9
Homer discovers a new miracle hair growth formula called Dimoxinil and cheats on some insurance forms so he can buy some. Homer grows hair overnight and is soon given a promotion at the Springfield Nuclear Power Plant. He gets a new secretary named Karl, who helps him become successful. However, Mr. Burns' assistant Waylon Smithers becomes jealous of all the attention Burns is giving Homer and discovers that Homer had committed insurance fraud on the insurance forms. Smithers tries to fire Homer, but Karl claims he committed the insurance fraud and is fired in Homer's stead. Bart spills Homer's remaining Dimoxinil and Homer loses all his hair. As a result, Homer is demoted back to his old position.
16	3	"Treehouse of Horror"	Wes Archer	John Swartzwelder	October 25, 1990	7F04	27.4
16	3	"Treehouse of Horror"	Rich Moore	Jay Kogen & Wallace Wolodarsky	October 25, 1990	7F04	27.4
16	3	"Treehouse of Horror"	David Silverman	Edgar Allan Poe & Sam Simon	October 25, 1990	7F04	27.4
In a Halloween anthology episode, Bart and Lisa tell scary stories.: "Bad Dream House": Bart tells a story where the Simpsons move into a haunted house built on a Native American burial ground. After the house is told off by Marge, it chooses to destroy itself rather than live with the Simpsons.; "Hungry Are the Damned": In Bart's other story, the Simpsons are abducted by Kang and Kodos to be taken to the planet Rigel IV for a feast. Lisa is suspicious of the aliens' intentions, believing that the Simpsons themselves are being cooked. When her trust is misplaced, the offended aliens return the family to Earth.; "The Raven": Lisa retells the poem by Edgar Allan Poe, in which Homer appears as the poem's narrator and Bart is the raven.
17	4	"Two Cars in Every Garage and Three Eyes on Every Fish"	Wes Archer	Sam Simon & John Swartzwelder	November 1, 1990	7F01	26.1
After Bart catches a three-eyed fish in a river downstream of the Springfield Nuclear Power Plant, the Plant is inspected and found to have 342 violations, which would cost $56 million to rectify. In order to prevent his Plant from being shut down, Mr. Burns decides to run for Governor. After a hard campaign which sees Burns rise from being universally despised to running neck and neck with incumbent Mary Bailey, it is decided that Burns will have dinner with a random employee the night before the election. Homer is chosen, much to Marge's chagrin. Marge serves the three-eyed fish to Burns for dinner, who cannot eat it and, as a result, loses the election.
18	5	"Dancin' Homer"	Mark Kirkland	Ken Levine & David Isaacs	November 8, 1990	7F05	26.1
Homer fires up the crowd at a Springfield Isotopes game and is chosen to be the team's new mascot. He immediately becomes a popular attraction and the Isotopes start a winning streak. As a result, Homer is promoted to the team in Capital City. The Simpsons move to Capital City, but Homer fails to enthrall the crowd, and returns home.
19	6	"Dead Putting Society"	Rich Moore	Jeff Martin	November 15, 1990	7F08	25.4
Ned Flanders invites Homer to his house for a beer. Homer, seeing how nice Ned's house is, becomes jealous, causing Flanders to angrily ask him to leave. Flanders immediately regrets his outburst and tries to make up with Homer, who remains defiant. One day while mini golfing, Bart and Flanders' son Todd decide to enter a tournament. Homer becomes confident that Bart will win and makes a bet with Ned that the father of the boy who does not win will have to mow their neighbor's lawn in their wife's Sunday dress. On the day of the tournament, Bart and Todd make the finals but decide to call it a draw, forcing both Homer and Ned to fulfill the requirements of their bet.
20	7	"Bart vs. Thanksgiving"	David Silverman	George Meyer	November 22, 1990	7F07	25.9
When he is blamed for ruining Thanksgiving, Bart runs away and finds a soup kitchen and some homeless men. Eventually, Bart returns home, intending to apologize but has last minute thoughts and climbs to the roof of the Simpsons house where he hears Lisa sobbing. He apologizes to her, and the family happily enjoys a meal of leftovers.
21	8	"Bart the Daredevil"	Wes Archer	Jay Kogen & Wallace Wolodarsky	December 6, 1990	7F06	26.2
The Simpsons go to a monster truck rally that features famous daredevil Lance Murdock. Bart immediately becomes enamored and decides he wants to become a daredevil too. Bart's first stunt ends in injury and despite the family and Dr. Hibbert's best efforts, he continues to attempt stunts. Bart decides to jump the Springfield Gorge, but Homer gets wind of his plan and makes Bart promise not to jump it. Bart immediately breaks his promise and goes to jump the gorge anyway, but Homer stops him just in time and finally gets Bart to swear he will stop being a daredevil. Homer accidentally ends up having to jump the gorge himself, failing in the attempt.
22	9	"Itchy & Scratchy & Marge"	Jim Reardon	John Swartzwelder	December 20, 1990	7F09	22.2
Maggie attacks Homer with a mallet, and Marge immediately blames The Itchy & Scratchy Show for turning her violent. Marge forms S.N.U.H. (Springfieldians for Nonviolence, Understanding, and Helping) and campaigns against the show. Eventually she successfully gets the writers to change their ways and make the show less violent. Meanwhile, Michelangelo's David goes on a coast-to-coast tour of the U.S., and the members of S.N.U.H. mobilize to protest it. Marge, however, says she likes the statue and, realizing it is wrong to censor one art form but not another, gives up her protest.
23	10	"Bart Gets Hit by a Car"	Mark Kirkland	John Swartzwelder	January 10, 1991	7F10	24.8
One day, Bart is skateboarding when he is suddenly hit by Mr. Burns's car. An attorney named Lionel Hutz suggests that the Simpsons sue Burns, promising a big cash settlement. Homer agrees, and he and Hutz spend time fabricating Bart's story, taking him to see Dr. Nick Riviera, who has dubious credentials. Marge opposes suing Burns and would be happy with him paying Bart's medical bills and apologizing. Burns eventually finds out about the phony doctor and Marge is called to the witness stand during the trial. She refuses to lie, and her testimony leads to the trial being lost.
24	11	"One Fish, Two Fish, Blowfish, Blue Fish"	Wes Archer	Nell Scovell	January 24, 1991	7F11	24.2
The Simpsons go to a new sushi bar, where Homer takes a liking to the food and decides to try fugu, which is poisonous if not cut properly. Homer's fugu is not, and he is taken to the hospital where he is told he has 22 hours to live. Homer makes a list of things he wants to do, and spends his last day making amends with Grampa and talking to his children. Homer accepts his fate, but it turns out he was not poisoned after all, and he vows to live life to its fullest. Homer then continues to live his life as before.
25	12	"The Way We Was"	David Silverman	Al Jean & Mike Reiss & Sam Simon	January 31, 1991	7F12	26.8
In the first Simpsons flashback episode, Marge tells the story of how she and Homer met in high school in 1974. Marge and Homer meet for the first time during detention and he immediately tries to get Marge to be his date for the prom. She initially agrees, but ends up attending with Artie Ziff. In the end, Marge regrets going with Artie, and reveals that she has fallen in love with Homer.
26	13	"Homer vs. Lisa and the 8th Commandment"	Rich Moore	Steve Pepoon	February 7, 1991	7F13	26.2
Homer gets an illegal cable hook up. Despite their enjoyment of the new channels, Lisa becomes suspicious that they are stealing cable. Her suspicions are confirmed by Reverend Lovejoy and Lisa protests by no longer watching television. Meanwhile, Homer invites his friends over to watch a boxing match, but Lisa's protest gets to him. He decides not to watch the fight and cuts the cable.
27	14	"Principal Charming"	Mark Kirkland	David M. Stern	February 14, 1991	7F15	23.9
Selma begs Marge to help her find a husband and she enlists Homer's help. Meanwhile, Bart gets in trouble at school and Homer is brought in to talk to Principal Skinner, who he decides would be perfect for Selma. Homer invites Skinner to dinner, but he falls in love with Patty instead of Selma. Patty and Skinner start dating, much to Selma's unhappiness. Skinner proposes to Patty, but she rejects him because of her bond with Selma.
28	15	"Oh Brother, Where Art Thou?"	Wes Archer	Jeff Martin	February 21, 1991	7F16	26.8
Grampa confesses that Homer has a half-brother, and Homer immediately tries to track him down. Homer eventually discovers that his half-brother is Herb Powell, the head of a car manufacturer in Detroit. Herb immediately starts to bond with Bart and Lisa and he invites Homer to design his own car. Homer's car design is a disaster, causing Herb to become bankrupt. Guest star: Danny DeVito
29	16	"Bart's Dog Gets an 'F'"	Jim Reardon	Jon Vitti	March 7, 1991	7F14	23.9
Homer becomes fed up with Santa's Little Helper, who continually destroys things. He says he will get rid of him unless he goes to an obedience school. Bart, Lisa and Maggie have grown to love the dog and promise to train him. Santa's Little Helper does poorly there, as Bart is unwilling to use a choke chain. The night before the final exam, Bart and Santa's Little Helper play on Lisa's suggestion, thinking it will be their last few hours together. This bonding breaks down the communication barrier, meaning Santa's Little Helper can now understand Bart's commands, thus passing obedience school much to the family's (except Homer's) happiness. Meanwhile, Lisa has the mumps.
30	17	"Old Money"	David Silverman	Jay Kogen & Wallace Wolodarsky	March 28, 1991	7F17	21.2
Grampa falls in love with a wealthy woman named Bea Simmons. On Bea's birthday, Grampa tries to celebrate it, but he is dragged away by Homer. Bea dies that night and Grampa blames Homer for causing him to have missed her last moments. After the funeral, Grampa receives her fortune of $106,000. Bea's ghost appears and she tells him to forgive Homer and spend his money on a worthy cause.
31	18	"Brush with Greatness"	Jim Reardon	Brian K. Roberts	April 11, 1991	7F18	20.6
After finding some old paintings she did of Ringo Starr, Marge decides to take an art class at Springfield Community College. There, she becomes the top student and wins the college art show. Meanwhile, Mr. Burns needs a painting for the Burns Wing of the Springfield Art Museum, and asks Marge to paint him. At first, she has trouble painting such an evil man, but then decides to paint him naked and frail. Everyone, even Burns, praises Marge's painting. Meanwhile, Homer decides to go on a diet after being stuck on a water slide during a family outing. Guest star: Ringo Starr
32	19	"Lisa's Substitute"	Rich Moore	Jon Vitti	April 25, 1991	7F19	17.7
When Miss Hoover falls ill with a suspected case of Lyme disease, she is replaced by substitute teacher Mr. Bergstrom. Because of his unorthodox teaching methods, Lisa quickly takes a liking to him. Just as Lisa is about to ask Mr. Bergstrom over to her parents' house for dinner, Miss Hoover returns. Meanwhile, Bart runs for class president against Martin Prince, but loses due to the fact that nobody in the class voted, with the exception of Martin and one of his supporters. Guest star: Dustin Hoffman. Credited as "Sam Etic"
33	20	"The War of the Simpsons"	Mark Kirkland	John Swartzwelder	May 2, 1991	7F20	19.7
After Homer gets drunk at a party, Marge decides to sign them up for a marriage counseling retreat. Homer finds out the retreat will be held at Catfish Lake and packs his fishing equipment, despite Marge's telling him that all they will be doing is resolving their differences. At the lake the next morning, Homer tries to sneak away to go fishing, but Marge catches him and he takes a walk instead. On the dock, Homer finds an abandoned fishing pole. The pole, with the legendary Catfish named General Sherman on the line, yanks him off the pier into a small rowboat, and onto the lake. Homer catches his fish and when he sees Marge upset, immediately lets it go to prove his love for her.
34	21	"Three Men and a Comic Book"	Wes Archer	Jeff Martin	May 9, 1991	7F21	21.0
Bart, Milhouse and Martin Prince pool their money together to buy the first Radioactive Man comic from Comic Book Guy. They discover that they are unable to share the comic and due to their mistrust of each other, end up destroying it.
35	22	"Blood Feud"	David Silverman	George Meyer	July 11, 1991	7F22	17.3
After Mr. Burns falls ill and desperately needs a blood transfusion, Homer discovers Bart has Burns's rare blood type. Homer urges his son to donate, promising that they will be handsomely rewarded. Having received the blood, however, all Burns does is send the family a card. Enraged, Homer writes an insulting reply, but Marge convinces him at the last minute not to send it, but Bart unknowingly mails it anyway. Mr. Burns becomes furious and demands that Homer be beaten. Smithers calls off the beating, however, on the grounds that this action is no way to thank the man who saved Mr. Burns's life. He convinces Burns to instead buy the family a present.

== DVD release ==
The DVD boxset for season two was released by 20th Century Fox Home Entertainment in the United States and Canada on August 6, 2002, eleven years after it had completed broadcast on television. As well as every episode from the season, the DVD release features bonus material including commentaries for every episode. The commentaries were recorded in late 2001.

The Complete Second Season
Set Details			Special Features
22 episodes; 4-disc set; 1.33:1 aspect ratio; AUDIO; English 5.1 Dolby Digital; English 2.0 Dolby Surround; French 2.0 Dolby Surround; SUBTITLES; English SDH; Spanish			Optional commentaries for all 22 episodes; An early interview with James L. Brooks and Matt Groening; Bart at the American Music Awards (with commentary); The Simpsons presenting at the Emmy Awards; "Do the Bartman" music video (director's cut with commentary); "Deep, Deep Trouble" music video (with commentary); Featurette: "Creation of an Episode"; Foreign Language Clips; Two Cars in Every Garage and Three Eyes on Every Fish; French 2.0 Dolby Surround; German 2.0 Dolby Surround; Hungarian 2.0 Dolby Surround; Portuguese 2.0 Dolby Surround; Spanish 2.0 Dolby Surround; 3 Butterfinger commercials; Gallery (Barbara Bush letters, animation, magazine covers); Early sketches
Release Dates
Region 1	Region 2	Region 4	
August 6, 2002	July 8, 2002	July 24, 2002	
