= Blood Feud (The Simpsons) =

- The Simpsons episode
- Episode no.: Season 2 Episode 22
- Directed by: David Silverman
- Written by: George Meyer
- Production code: 7F22
- Original air date: July 11, 1991

Episode features
- Chalkboard gag: "I will not sleep through my education"
- Couch gag: The couch falls through the floor with the family on it.
- Commentary: Matt Groening; Al Jean; David Silverman

Episode chronology
← Previous "Three Men and a Comic Book"	Next → "Stark Raving Dad"
- The Simpsons season 2

"Blood Feud" is the twenty-second and final episode of the second season of the American animated television series The Simpsons. It originally aired on Fox in the United States on July 11, 1991. In this episode, Mr. Burns falls ill and desperately needs a blood transfusion. Homer discovers Bart has Burns' rare blood type and urges him to donate, thinking the Simpsons will be handsomely rewarded. After receiving the blood transfusion, Burns sends them a thank-you card with no money. Marge convinces Homer not to send an insulting reply to his boss, but when Bart mails the letter anyway, Burns is livid. He later forgives Homer and sends the Simpsons a giant Olmec carving to show his gratitude, which is present in the Simpsons' residence's basement for the remainder of the series.

This episode was written by George Meyer and directed by David Silverman. Executive producer Sam Simon and writers Al Jean and Mike Reiss came up with the idea for the episode. A co-worker had recently needed a blood transfusion, and the writers thought it would be funny if Mr. Burns had one. Although Meyer was credited with writing the episode, Jean and Reiss re-wrote and polished the script. The episode includes the debut of the Olmec head Xtapolapocetl, which would become a common background prop in the Simpson home.

"Blood Feud" was part of the season two production run, but was completed behind schedule. It was originally broadcast on July 11, 1991, as part of "premiere week", the Fox Network's attempt to expand the typical 30-week prime time season and gain new viewers for the fall. In its original broadcast, the episode finished 24th in ratings for the week with a Nielsen rating of 10.8.

== Plot ==
Mr. Burns falls ill with a life-threatening condition called hypohemia — in which the body fails to produce enough blood — and needs a blood transfusion. Burns' search for a donor finds that none of the employees at Springfield Nuclear Power Plant share his rare blood type, double O negative. Homer originally offers to donate some of his blood believing that he would get a reward for saving Burns' life, but discovers that his blood type is A positive. When discussing it with Marge, he learns that his son Bart is double O negative. Although Bart has second thoughts on donating blood, Homer urges him to, promising that Burns will reward the Simpsons handsomely. After Bart reluctantly agrees and his donation saves Burns' life, Burns sends the Simpsons a thank-you card. Enraged at the paltry gesture, Homer writes an insulting reply, but Marge convinces him not to send it. The next morning, Homer finds the letter missing and learns Bart has mailed it.

When Homer fails to prevent the letter from reaching Burns' desk by attempting and failing to fill the mailbox with water, Burns receives the letter. Burns is initially impressed with the positive start of the letter, but before Homer can leave Burns' office, Burns reads the rest of the letter. Furious, Burns demands that Homer be beaten by thugs, but Smithers protests, insisting it is no way to return the favor the Simpsons performed for him. A remorseful Burns soon sends the family a colossal Olmec head of the god Xtapalapaquetl, which Bart likes. He also apologizes to Homer for misjudging him and gives him a copy of his book, Will There Ever Be A Rainbow?.

As the Simpsons stare at the head, they debate the lesson they have learned from the affair. Lisa suggests that perhaps there is no lesson. Homer observes that the recent events are "just a bunch of stuff that happened", though everyone agrees the past few days have been a memorable turn of events.

== Production ==
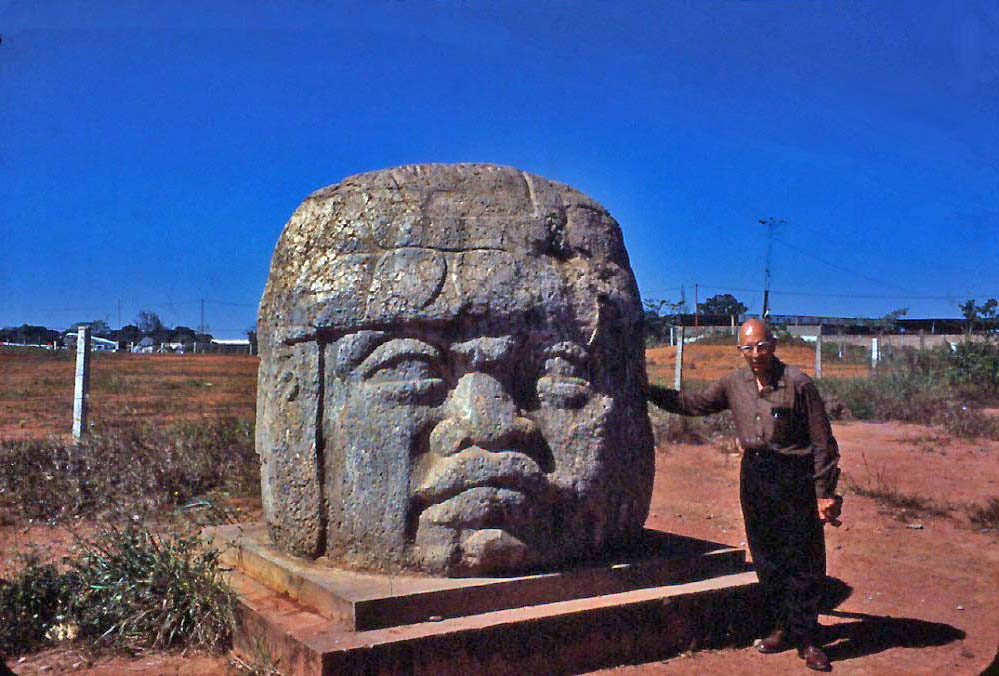
A real Olmec Head, similar to the one shown in the episode.

"Blood Feud" was written by George Meyer and directed by David Silverman. Executive producer Sam Simon and writers Al Jean and Mike Reiss came up with the idea for the episode while they were trying to fill up the rest of the production run. A co-worker had recently needed a blood transfusion, and the writers thought it would be funny if Mr. Burns had one. Although Meyer was credited with writing the episode, Jean and Reiss re-wrote and polished the script. Harry Shearer, the voice of Mr. Burns and Smithers, could not attend the table read for the episode, so his parts were read by Dan Castellaneta (the voice of Homer). "Blood Feud" includes a first act that is much longer than a normal episode of the show. The producers were going to end the act with Mr. Burns feeling better, but decided to extend it to show how the Simpson family was affected. "Blood Feud" ends with the family discussing what the message of the episode was, but decide that there was no message. The writers were having trouble conceiving an ending, but decided that since there was no point, they would discuss it. In his book Planet Simpson, Chris Turner writes that the ending is meant to openly mock the "notion of the tidy sitcom-style moral" and the "formulaic plots of sitcoms".

David Silverman describes the episode as "one of my very favorite episodes that I had the pleasure to direct". He notes that several "standard Homerisms" appear for the first time in the episode, such as Homer's conversations with his brain and his high-pitched "fairy voice". Silverman inserted a red herring into the episode in a scene where Mr. Burns says that he was rejuvenated. Silverman used a close-up of Burns when he says "blood of a young boy" in hopes of misleading viewers into thinking that the rest of episode would be about Burns seeking more of Bart's blood.

The episode includes the debut of the Olmec head Xtapolapocetl. After the episode, it was moved into the Simpsons' basement, where it has since reappeared as a prop in the background of several episodes, although never in a major role. The design was partially based on real Olmec heads, but changed to look more interesting and grotesque.

This is also the final episode to be mixed in stereo sound. Beginning with the season 3 premiere, the series would be mixed in Dolby Surround, until being discontinued in 2009.

== Cultural references ==
The composition and setting of the scene where Smithers and Dr. Hibbert discuss Mr. Burns' health is partially inspired by a scene from Citizen Kane where Kane talks to his wife Susan Alexander after she attempts suicide. Otto is heard humming "Iron Man" by Black Sabbath. The ghostwriter Mr. Burns hires mentions that he wrote "Like Hell I Can't". The title is a play on Sammy Davis Jr.'s autobiography Yes, I Can. Homer mistells the story of "Androcles and the Lion", instead referring to it as "Hercules and the Lion". A mural in the post office resembles Michelangelo's The Creation of Adam. Burns's line about getting "A frabulous, grabulous, zip-zoop-zabulous present" is similar to lines used in Dr. Seuss books. The scene where Homer dictates the angry letter to Mr. Burns, and the scene where he and Bart attempt to get it out of the mailbox, are inspired by The Honeymooners episode "Letter to the Boss".

The location of Springfield is displayed in this episode, however, the State initials are JI (J and I letters) or Jl (J and small L). This is displayed in the letter Homer receives from Mr. Burns. The address is 1000 Mammon Ln. Springfield, JI/Jl, with an illegible ZIP Code.

== First broadcast ==
"Blood Feud" was part of the season two production run, but was completed behind schedule. It was originally broadcast on July 11, 1991, as part of the Fox Network's "premiere week". Fox aired new episodes of several of its top shows, including The Simpsons and Beverly Hills, 90210, in hopes of expanding the normal 30 week prime time season and gaining new viewers for the fall. Although "Three Men and a Comic Book" was the official season two finale, "Blood Feud" is considered part of the second season and was included in The Complete Second Season DVD boxset.

In its original broadcast, "Blood Feud" finished 24th in ratings for the week of July 8–14, 1991, with a Nielsen rating of 10.8. It was the second highest rated program on Fox after Beverly Hills, 90210. The episode beat a rerun of The Cosby Show, which aired at the same time on NBC, which had a Nielsen Rating of 10.3. Fox finished second overall on July 11, with an average rating of 10.4.

== Reception ==
The episode has received positive reviews from television critics. The authors of the book I Can't Believe It's a Bigger and Better Updated Unofficial Simpsons Guide, Gary Russell and Gareth Roberts, wrote, "One of those shows that people always talk about when discussing The Simpsons – and rightfully so. Homer's transformation from angry parent to a sensible, calm husband is excellent, as is his reaction to Bart posting his angry letter. Their attempts to retrieve the letter and Burns' eventual reaction are fabulous."

DVD Movie Guide's Colin Jacobson wrote: "In many ways, 'Feud' seemed more derivative than usual. Not only did it resemble parts of 'Two Cars in Every Garage and Three Eyes on Every Fish', but Homer's attempts to regain the letter before Burns reads it appears reminiscent of an episode of The Flintstones. Despite those similarities, 'Feud' still provided a very entertaining show. The program packed in a slew of hilarious moments, from Homer's description of a Bible story to his visit to the post office." Ben Rayner of The Toronto Star included "Blood Feud" in his list of the top ten episodes of The Simpsons, noting that "Homer's efforts to thwart the mail service still kill me 15 years later."

== In popular culture ==
The scene where Bart prank calls Moe and asks for a "Mike Rotch" (My crotch) was later used in the Weird Al Yankovic song "Phony Calls".
