= Three Men and a Comic Book =

- The Simpsons episode
- Episode no.: Season 2 Episode 21
- Directed by: Wes M. Archer
- Written by: Jeff Martin
- Production code: 7F21
- Original air date: May 9, 1991

Guest appearances
- Cloris Leachman as Mrs. Glick; Daniel Stern as the adult version of Bart

Episode features
- Chalkboard gag: "I will not show off" (written in Blackletter font)
- Couch gag: The couch tips over backwards.
- Commentary: Matt Groening; Jeff Martin; Al Jean; Mike Reiss

Episode chronology
← Previous "The War of the Simpsons"	Next → "Blood Feud"
- The Simpsons season 2

"Three Men and a Comic Book" is the twenty-first and penultimate episode of the second season (and the de facto season finale) of the American animated television series The Simpsons. It originally aired on Fox in the United States on May 9, 1991. In this episode, Bart finds the rare first issue of Radioactive Man for sale at a comic book convention. Unable to afford it, he convinces Martin and Milhouse to pool their money to buy the valuable comic, only to see it destroyed by their selfishness and inability to share. This episode contains the first appearance of the Android's Dungeon and its owner, Comic Book Guy, voiced by Hank Azaria.

This episode was written by Jeff Martin and directed by Wes Archer. It features cultural references to comic book characters such as Richie Rich and Casper the Friendly Ghost. Daniel Stern, who played Marv in Home Alone, guest starred in this episode.

Since airing, the episode has received generally positive reviews from television critics for its use of parodies and cultural references. It acquired a Nielsen rating of 12.9, and was the highest-rated show on Fox the week it aired.

== Plot ==
While attending a comic book convention dressed as his superhero alter ego Bartman, Bart finds the first issue of Radioactive Man selling for $100 at Comic Book Guy's Android's Dungeon. Since he does not have enough money to buy it, he decides to get a job. Bart performs back-breaking labor for Mrs. Glick, who gives him only fifty cents for all of his hard work, including weeding carnivorous plants, feeding Mrs Glick's cat, and scrubbing sludge off her roof.

When Bart sees Martin and Milhouse at the Android's Dungeon, attempting to buy the comic book and a Carl Yastremski baseball card, respectively, he persuades them to pool their money and buy the comic book. Since none of them is willing to let the comic book out of his sight, they spend the night together in Bart's treehouse. They get progressively more paranoid, and Bart grows convinced Martin and Milhouse are conspiring against him as a thunderstorm approaches.

When Martin gets up in the middle of the night to use the bathroom, Bart thinks he plans to steal the comic and ties him up. Milhouse tries to alert Marge that Bart has gone crazy, but Bart thinks he is making a move for the comic and tackles him. Milhouse falls over the side of the treehouse, but Bart catches him precariously by his sleeve. Milhouse admits to Bart he only wanted the Yastrzemski card to begin with, not the comic. When a gale of wind takes hold of the comic, Bart is forced to decide between grabbing it and rescuing Milhouse. After Bart pulls Milhouse to safety, the comic blows out the door and onto the ground, where it is shredded by Santa's Little Helper and struck by lightning. The next morning, the three boys reflect on how their inability to share the comic led to its destruction, while a bird lines its nest with a scrap from the last page.

== Production ==
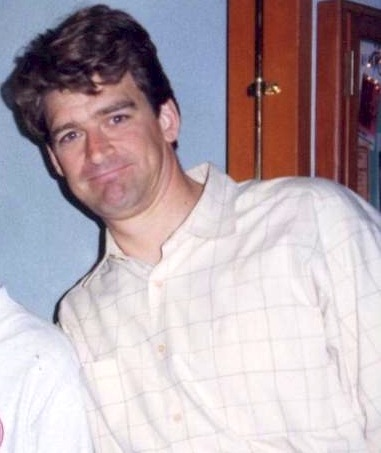
This episode was written by Jeff Martin (pictured) and directed by Wes Archer.

The episode was written by Jeff Martin and directed by Wes Archer. Characters making their first appearances on the show are Comic Book Guy, Mrs. Glick, Radioactive Man, Fallout Boy, and Bartman.

Although many suggestions state that Comic Book Guy was inspired by the show's creator Matt Groening, Comic Book Guy was partly inspired by a clerk at the Los Angeles Amok bookshop who, according to Simpsons writer George Meyer, often "[sat] on the high stool, kind of lording over the store with that supercilious attitude and eating behind the counter a big Styrofoam container full of fried clams with a lot of tartar sauce". Matt Groening noted: "I can't tell you how many times people have come up to me and said, 'I know who you based that comic book guy on. It's that comic-book guy right down the block.' And I have to tell them, 'No, it's every comic-bookstore guy in America.'" Cast member Hank Azaria based Comic Book Guy's voice on a student who went by the name "F" and lived in the room next door at his college. According to Simpsons writer Mike Reiss, the writers "settled" on naming his store "The Android's Dungeon and Baseball Card Shop" after a late-night writing session, figuring they wouldn't see it after this episode.

Mrs. Glick was based on an old lady Martin and his brother used to do chores for when they were kids. Martin said they got to "pull weeds until [their] hands would bleed", and yet they were paid only two quarters for several hours of work. American actress Cloris Leachman provided the voice of Mrs. Glick in the episode.

The episode features a parody of The Wonder Years, in which Bart stares into the distance after realizing he has to get his first job, and an older version of Bart's voice is heard saying "I didn't realize it at the time, but a little piece of my childhood had slipped away forever." Daniel Stern guest starred as the voice of the adult Bart, just like he did for the adult voice of the character Kevin in the television show The Wonder Years (he had also featured with Yeardley Smith in the movie City Slickers around the time this episode was produced). Reiss stated Stern was a "pleasure" to work with, and it took him only a few minutes to record his lines. Stern's younger brother David M. Stern worked as a writer on both The Simpsons and The Wonder Years, so he helped the writers get the idioms and the wording of the parody right.

When a rerun of this episode aired in 1992, a brief tribute to The Cosby Show aired following the end credits. The Cosby Show ended on April 30, 1992, and the tribute featured Bart and Homer discussing the quality of the show, and its importance to Bill Cosby.

== Cultural references ==
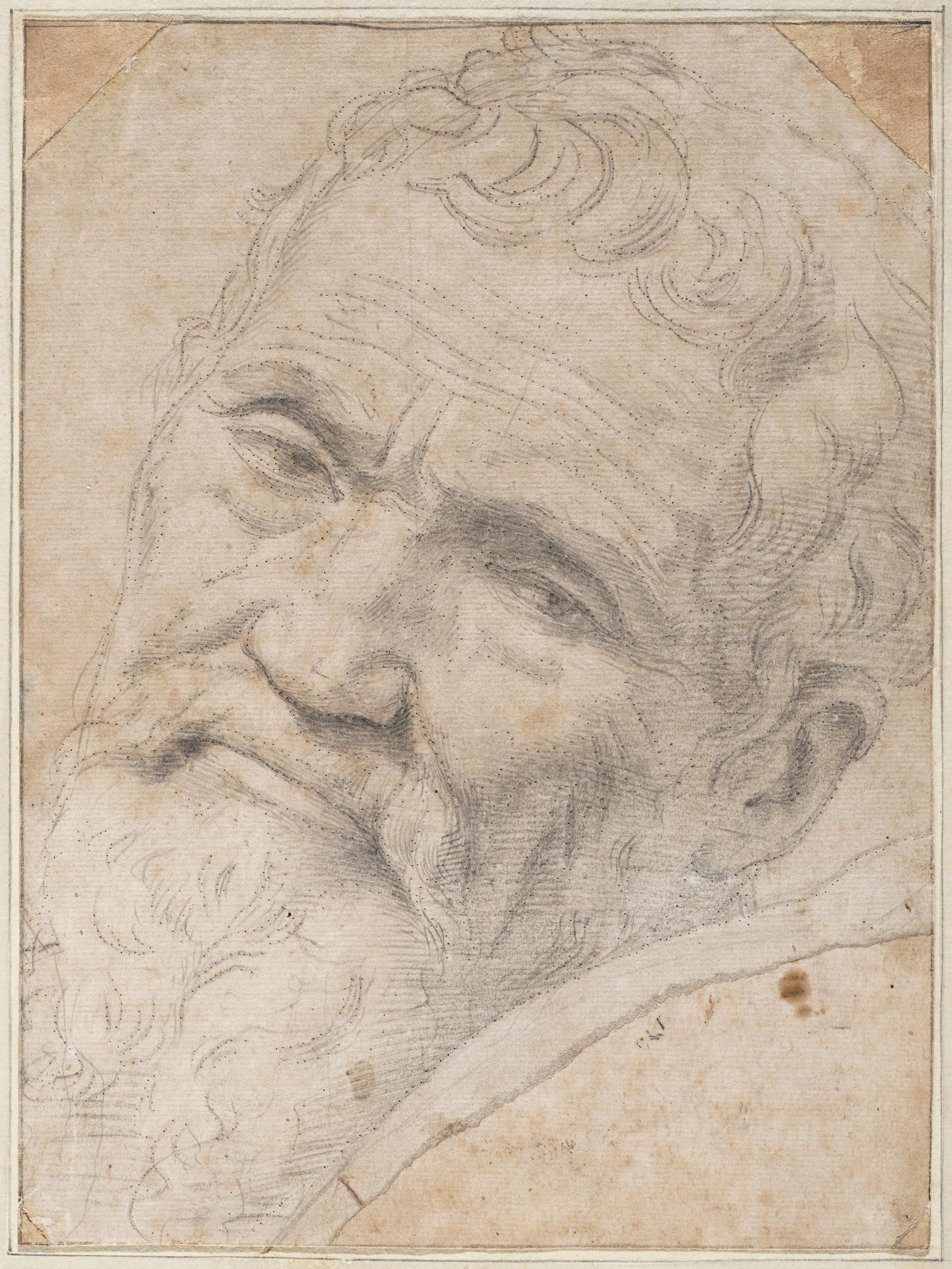
Homer makes a reference to the Italian painter Michelangelo.

At the beginning of the episode, Lisa reveals that she collects Casper the Friendly Ghost and Richie Rich comics, and Homer makes reference to Wonder Woman. Radioactive Man's origin is nearly identical to the Marvel Comics character The Incredible Hulk, as they each had gained superpowers from absorbing massive amounts of gamma radiation during an experiment. The warning from the convention MC not to ask questions about the death of Radioactive Man's actor Dirk Richter is a reference to the mysterious death of Superman's actor George Reeves, although the addition of bordello could also be a reference to the unsolved 1978 murder of Bob Crane.

When Bart asks Homer for money to buy the comic book, Homer replies: "A hundred bucks? For a comic book?! Who drew it, Micha-ma-langelo?" This is a reference to the Italian painter and sculptor Michelangelo, whose name Homer cannot pronounce. Bart's inner monologue in the diner scene is a parody of the narration in the coming-of-age comedy-drama series The Wonder Years and was voiced by Wonder Years actor Daniel Stern.

Milhouse initially goes into the comic store to buy a 1973 Topps card of the former Boston Red Sox player, Carl Yastrzemski, "when he had the big sideburns". When the boys first unwrap the comic book, Martin describes it as "[T]he stuff dreams are made of", which is how Humphrey Bogart's character describes the Maltese Falcon at the end of the movie, The Maltese Falcon. The Radioactive Man commercial for Laramie cigarettes is a takeoff on The Flintstones characters' starring in Winston commercials in the 1960s. When Bart begs Mrs. Glick not to apply iodine to his wounded arm, she grabs his arm and the scene shifts to their silhouettes as Bart screams, mirroring a scene in the 1939 film Gone with the Wind. The accusation and suspicion that grows between the boys is similar to the plot of the film The Treasure of the Sierra Madre.

When Martin makes a squealing noise while falling in the treehouse, Bart calls him "Piggy" and threatens to stuff an apple into his mouth, resembling a similar quote from the book Lord of the Flies (1954), by William Golding. Bart trying to save Milhouse from falling from the treehouse is a reference to a scene in the film from Alfred Hitchcock from 1942, Saboteur. The title of the episode is a reference to the 1987 comedy film Three Men and a Baby in which three men have to take delicate care of a baby.

== Reception ==
In its original broadcast, "Three Men and a Comic Book" finished twenty-third in the ratings for the week of May 6–12, 1991, with a Nielsen rating of 12.9, equivalent to twelve million viewing households. The episode was the highest-rated show on Fox that week. It was the first time The Simpsons beat The Cosby Show in the ratings.

Since airing, the episode has received mostly positive reviews from television critics. DVD Movie Guide's Colin Jacobson lauded it for its use of new characters, commenting that "of all season two's Bart-focused episodes, only 'Bart the Daredevil' offers competition with 'Comic' as the best of the bunch. It's a tough call, but I'll take 'Comic' in a squeaker. The show melds the series' deft satirical tone with exceptional character development. Bart seems to grow especially strongly, and his psychological meltdown in the third act is hilarious."

"Three Men and a Comic Book" was named the best episode of the season by IGN. The authors of the book I Can't Believe It's a Bigger and Better Updated Unofficial Simpsons Guide, Gary Russell and Gareth Roberts, commented that unless you have a "passing understanding of comic books and their buyers' behaviour, some of the jokes will pass you by". Doug Pratt, a DVD reviewer and Rolling Stone contributor, criticized the episode for not being inspired enough, and added that the Wonder Years parody "seems pointless". "Three Men and a Comic Book" is Bryce Wilson of Cinema Blend's favorite episode of the season. Wilson praised the episode for its cultural references, calling them "true greatness".

Surrey Now's Michael Roberds praised the Treasure of the Sierra Madre parody, saying it is "one of the more clever film parodies hidden within a typical Simpsons plot". Colin Kennedy of Empire called the Treasure of the Sierra Madre parody the ninth-best film parody of the show, commenting that "Bart turns [into] a perfect Bogart – grizzled, paranoid and sleep-deprived. With lighting and camera angles half inched from Huston, this priceless gag is joyfully pitched over the heads of 90 percent of the audience." The episode's reference to Saboteur was named the 25th greatest film reference in the history of the show by Total Film's Nathan Ditum.
