= Bart Gets an "F" =

"Bart Gets an 'F'"
- The Simpsons episode
- The "Snow Day" sequence was one of the most challenging sequences David Silverman had to animate, as it featured multiple panoramic shots and was difficult to time correctly.
- Episode no.: Season 2 Episode 1
- Directed by: David Silverman
- Written by: David M. Stern
- Production code: 7F03
- Original air date: October 11, 1990

Guest appearance
- Marcia Wallace as Mrs. Krabappel

Episode features
- Chalkboard gag: (first) "I will not encourage others to fly"/(second) "I will not fake my way through life" (during the episode)
- Couch gag: The family sits on the couch and it falls through the floor as Homer says "D'oh!"
- Commentary: Matt Groening; James L. Brooks; Al Jean; Mike Reiss; David Silverman

Episode chronology
← Previous "Some Enchanted Evening"	Next → "Simpson and Delilah"
- The Simpsons season 2

"Bart Gets an 'F'" is the first episode of the second season of the American animated television series The Simpsons and the fourteenth episode overall. It aired originally on Fox in the United States on October 11, 1990. In this episode, Bart Simpson fails four consecutive history exams, and the district psychiatrist recommends he repeat the fourth grade if he cannot pass his next one.

This episode was written by David M. Stern and directed by David Silverman. "Bart Gets an 'F'" marks the first appearance of Mayor Quimby as well as a new opening sequence. It was the third episode produced for the second season. It was chosen to be the season premiere because it prominently features Bart, who enjoyed popularity during the early 1990s.

Due to the success of the first season of The Simpsons, Fox decided to switch the show's time slot to Thursday at 8:00 p.m. ET where it aired opposite NBC's The Cosby Show, the number one show at the time. Throughout the summer, several news outlets published stories about the supposed "Bill vs. Bart" rivalry and heavily hyped the first episode of the second season. Some critics predicted "Bart gets an 'F'" would do considerably worse in the ratings than The Cosby Show. However, the episode's final Nielsen rating was 18.4, and a 29% share of the audience placed it second in its time slot behind The Cosby Show with an 18.5 rating and 29% share. The episode finished eighth in the weekly ratings, but was watched by an estimated 33.6 million viewers, making it the week's number one show, in terms of actual viewers. It became the highest rated and most watched program in the history of the Fox network and remained so until 1995 when it was eclipsed by the NFC Championship game between the Cowboys and the 49ers. It remains the highest rated episode in the history of The Simpsons.

"Bart Gets an 'F'" received positive reviews from television critics. Entertainment Weekly ranked it 31st on its 1999 list of "The 100 Greatest Moments in Television".

== Plot ==
At Springfield Elementary School, Bart presents a book report on Treasure Island, but it soon becomes obvious that he has not actually read the book and was just judging the book by its cover. Mrs. Krabappel confirms this by asking Bart the name of the pirate in the book. Bart tries to decide between Blackbeard, Captain Nemo, Captain Hook, and Long John Silver. When he incorrectly guesses Bluebeard, Mrs. Krabappel tells him to sit down and that she'd like to see him after class.

While writing "I will not fake my way through life" on the wall 100 times, Bart is warned by Mrs. Krabappel that there will be an upcoming exam on Colonial America. At school the next day, Bart feigns illness to avoid taking another test. After grilling Milhouse for the test answers, he scores even worse than he did when Mrs. Krabappel gives Bart a different set of test questions.

Homer and Marge meet with the school psychiatrist Dr. J. Loren Pryor who recommends for Bart to repeat the fourth grade. Scared for Bart's academic future, Marge and Homer support this idea. A terrified Bart vows to improve his grades.

In desperation, Bart asks Martin to tutor him, promising to improve Martin's popularity in return. Bart teaches Martin how to play pranks and slack off; Martin discovers he prefers Bart's lifestyle to his own and breaks his promise to Bart. To buy more time to study, Bart prays to God for a miracle to avoid the next day's test at school.

A heavy snowfall occurs overnight; the next morning, a snow day is declared throughout Springfield. As Bart prepares to play in the snow, Lisa reveals she overheard him praying and urges him to make good use of his answered prayer. Bart reluctantly studies while everyone else is having fun in the snow; however when Bart makes a serious attempt at studying by imagining himself a member of the First Continental Congress at the signing of the Declaration of Independence it becomes a distraction when it snows in July and the Framers rush outdoors to sled. Returning to reality, Bart forces himself to concentrate reminding himself he is in danger of repeating the fourth grade.

Despite his best efforts, Bart fails the next day's test by one point. Bart breaks down in tears and compares his failure to George Washington's surrender of Fort Necessity to the French in 1754. Edna is impressed at this obscure historical reference and gives him an extra point for demonstrating applied knowledge. Bart is so ecstatic when he receives a barely passing grade (D-minus), he runs through Springfield, announcing his success, and even kisses Mrs. Krabappel, much to his eventual disgust. When Bart returns home, his parents post the test on the refrigerator. Bart remarks that "part of this D-minus belongs to God".

== Production ==
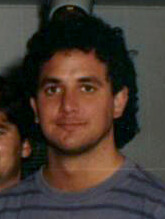
"Bart gets an 'F'" was the first episode written by David M. Stern

"Bart gets an 'F'" was the first episode of The Simpsons written by David M. Stern. David Silverman directed it. Over the summer of 1990, Bart was characterized by some parents and conservatives as a poor role model for children because of his rebellious nature. Several American public schools banned T-shirts featuring Bart's image with captions, like "I'm Bart Simpson. Who the hell are you?" and "Underachiever ('And proud of it, man!')" Several critics thought the episode was a response to these controversies. However, executive producer James L. Brooks responded it was not, but added, "we're mindful of it. I do think it's important for us that Bart does badly in school. There are students like that. Besides, I'm very wary of television where everybody is supposed to be a role model. You don't run across that many role models in real life. Why should television be full of them?" Sam Simon commented, "There are themes to the shows we did last year, important themes, I think it's a tribute to how well we executed them that nobody realized we had a point." Bart says "Cowabunga" for the second time (the first time being in "The Telltale Head"). This was commonly associated with Bart through its use as a T-shirt slogan. Mayor Quimby makes his first appearance in this episode, without his trademark sash that says "Mayor". The sash was later added because the writers feared viewers would not recognize him.

The episode was the first to feature a new opening sequence, shortened by fifteen seconds from its original length of roughly 90 seconds. The first season's opening sequence shows Bart stealing a "Bus Stop" sign, while the new sequence features him skateboarding past several characters, introduced during the previous season. Lisa's bike ride was cut, replaced by a one-second whiplash pan of Springfield showing other characters, before Homer's car pulls up in the driveway. Starting with season two, there were three versions of the opening: a full roughly 75-second version, a 45-second version, and a 25-second version. This gave the show's editors more leeway.

David Silverman believes the animators began to "come into their own" as they became used to the characters and were able to achieve more with character acting. During the scene where Bart delivers a speech saying he is "dumb as a post", Silverman wanted to cut quickly from several angles to give a sense of anxiety. Martin Prince's design was changed several times during the episode. There was a different model with larger eyes and wilder hair designed for the scene where Martin betrays Bart and runs off. Silverman describes the "Snow Day" sequence as one of the hardest things he ever had to animate. It features several long pans showing many characters engaging in various activities difficult to time correctly. Bart's fantasy where he sees the founding fathers of the United States uses muted colors and variations of red, white and blue. Silverman also had to work hard to make Bart cry without making his design look too off-putting; for this reason he is shown covering his face with a piece of paper.

== First broadcast ==
=== Move to Thursday ===
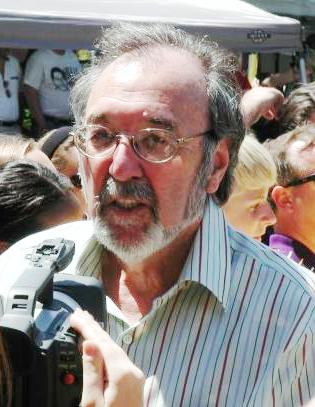
James L. Brooks opposed moving The Simpsons' broadcast to Thursday nights

The first season of The Simpsons had finished as high as fourth in the weekly ratings and was the Fox network's first series to rank among a season's top 30 highest-rated shows. Bart quickly became one of the most popular characters on television in what was termed "Bartmania". Due to the success of the show's first season, Fox decided to switch The Simpsons' time slot hoping it would steal ratings from NBC's "powerhouse" line up, generate more advertising revenue, and lead to higher ratings for Beverly Hills, 90210 and Babes, which would follow the show. The show was moved from its 8:00 p.m. EST Sunday slot to the same time on Thursday, where it would compete with NBC's The Cosby Show, the number one show at the time. Many of The Simpsons' producers, including James L. Brooks, were against the move. The show had been in the top 10 while airing on Sunday and they felt the move would destroy its ratings. Brooks commented: "Suddenly a show that was a hit is fighting for its survival, [...] We're not fighting Cosby, we just want to get healthy ratings. There have been two weeks in my life when a show I was associated with was number one in the ratings, and on Sunday night, we had a chance to be the number one show in the country. I don't think we have a chance on Thursday night." An ad for the show in TV Guide spoofed this, with Homer attempting to wrestle his son away from clinging for dear life to "The Simpsons" logo, with Bart remarking "I'm not moving to another night just because some network dude says so!"

"Two Cars in Every Garage and Three Eyes on Every Fish" was the first episode produced for the season, but "Bart Gets an 'F'" aired first because Bart was popular at the time and the producers had wanted the premiere to be an episode involving him. It aired opposite the fourth episode of the seventh season of The Cosby Show titled "Period of Adjustment", which saw the addition of Erika Alexander to the cast. The first 13 episodes of The Simpsons had been rerun several times through the summer, and Fox had promoted the first new episode heavily since May. News outlets had published stories about the supposed "Bill vs. Bart" rivalry.

=== Nielsen rating ===
Reruns of The Simpsons that aired in the Thursday time slot against new episodes of The Cosby Show were ranked as low as 73rd in the weekly ratings (compared with third place for The Cosby Show). Several critics predicted "Bart Gets an 'F'" would do considerably worse in the ratings than The Cosby Show. Greg Dawson of the Orlando Sentinel wrote he would "bet dollars to plain-cake doughnuts (a Homer pet peeve) that even a fresh Simpsons won't come within five rating points of Cosby, which could get a 30 share in a power blackout." Fox executive Peter Chernin said they were hoping to establish a foothold on Thursday night and "if we're really lucky and very fortunate, we're going to come in second place".

Early overnight ratings figures for the original broadcast of "Bart Gets an 'F'" in 24 cities projected that The Simpsons had a 19.9 Nielsen Rating and 30% share of the audience, while The Cosby Show had a 19.3 Nielsen Rating and 29% share. However, the final rating for the episode was an 18.4 and a 29% share of the audience. This placed it second in its time slot behind The Cosby Show, which had an 18.5 rating and 29% share. At the time, NBC had 208 television stations, while Fox had only 133. It finished eighth in the weekly ratings, tied with Who's the Boss?, while The Cosby Show finished seventh. The rating is based on the number of household televisions that were tuned into the show. Nielsen Media Research estimated that 33.6 million viewers watched the episode, making it the number one show in terms of actual viewers that week—The Cosby Show was watched by 28.5 million viewers and finished seventh. It became the highest rated and most watched program in the history of the Fox Network. It remained in that position until January 1, 1995, when a National Football League playoff game between the Minnesota Vikings and Chicago Bears achieved a Nielsen Rating of 21.0. It remains the highest rated episode in the history of The Simpsons.

== Cultural references ==
Bart's slapdash book report was on the Robert Louis Stevenson novel Treasure Island, while Martin presents Ernest Hemingway's The Old Man and the Sea. Later on, Martin makes remarks about the forecastle of the Pequod in reference to Moby Dick. During "Snow Day", the citizens of Springfield sing "Winter Wonderland". The scene where everyone in Springfield gathers around the town circle, holds hands and begins singing is a reference to How the Grinch Stole Christmas! "Hallelujah", the chorus from George Frideric Handel's Messiah, can be heard when it starts snowing.

== Reception ==
The episode has received positive reviews from television critics. The authors of the book I Can't Believe It's a Bigger and Better Updated Unofficial Simpsons Guide, Gary Russell and Gareth Roberts, wrote, "A cracking opener to the second season – especially memorable for the sequence in which Bart prays for school to be cancelled the following day only to find himself exiled from the ensuing winter wonderland." Virginia Mann of The Record felt it was "not as wildly funny as last season's best episodes, [but still] well-done, humorous, and, at times, poignant." The episode was praised for its emotional scenes. Tom Shales wrote the episode is "not only funny, it's touching" and praised it for the scenes where Bart prays, writing "There are few if any other entertainment shows on television that get into philosophical matters even this deeply. The Simpsons can be as thoughtful as a furrow-browed Bill Moyers pontification – yet infinitely more amusing." The Miami Herald's Hal Boedeker felt it "pulls off a finale that's thoughtful without being preachy, tender without being sappy. Despite the tears, the show keeps its edge. And the way TV usually smears on the schmaltz, that's quite an achievement." Phil Kloer of The Atlanta Journal-Constitution wrote "The episode does a good job of emphasizing the importance of studying without getting gooky. For all the talk about the anarchy of The Simpsons, the show sometimes has smuggled in an occasional message, as it does again." In his book The Gospel According to the Simpsons, Mark I. Pinsky writes "Bart gets an 'F'" offers the most detailed portrayal of the dynamic of prayer on The Simpsons." Steve L. Case later included the episode in his book Toons That Teach, a list of 75 cartoons that help teach biblical lessons.

The episode was ranked 31st on Entertainment Weekly's list of "The 100 Greatest Moments in Television", with Bruce Fretts noting it "stands as classic irreverent family TV". In 2007, Larina Adamson, a supervising producer on The Simpsons, named "Bart Gets an 'F'" as her favorite episode of the series. In 2010, the BBC named "Bart gets an 'F'" as one of the ten most memorable episodes of the show, calling it "insightful and poignant".
