= The Way We Was =

- The Simpsons episode
- Young Marge tutors Homer on his French
- Episode no.: Season 2 Episode 12
- Directed by: David Silverman
- Written by: Al Jean; Mike Reiss; Sam Simon
- Production code: 7F12
- Original air date: January 31, 1991

Guest appearance
- Jon Lovitz as Artie Ziff

Episode features
- Chalkboard gag: "I will not get very far with this attitude"
- Couch gag: The family sits on the couch and it falls through the floor.
- Commentary: Matt Groening; James L. Brooks; Al Jean; Mike Reiss; David Silverman

Episode chronology
← Previous "One Fish, Two Fish, Blowfish, Blue Fish"	Next → "Homer vs. Lisa and the 8th Commandment"
- The Simpsons season 2

"The Way We Was" is the twelfth episode of the second season of the American animated television series The Simpsons. It originally aired on Fox in the United States on January 31, 1991. In the episode, Marge tells the story of how she and Homer first met and fell in love. Flashing back to 1974, it is shown how Homer falls in love with Marge in high school and tries to get close to her by enlisting her as his French tutor. After several hours of verb conjugation, Marge falls for Homer too, only to become enraged when he admits he is not a French student, since the time she spent tutoring him meant she didn't have time to prepare for an important debate. Marge rejects Homer's invitation to the prom and goes with Artie Ziff, who turns out to be a terrible date and Marge realizes that it is Homer she really wants.

The episode was written by Al Jean, Mike Reiss, and Sam Simon, and directed by David Silverman. It was the first flashback episode of The Simpsons. Jon Lovitz guest-starred in it as Artie Ziff. The episode features cultural references to songs such as "The Joker" and "(They Long to Be) Close to You", and the television series Siskel & Ebert & the Movies. The title itself is a reference to the 1973 film The Way We Were.

Since airing, the episode has received mostly positive reviews from television critics. It acquired a Nielsen rating of 15.6, and was the highest rated show on Fox the week it aired.

== Plot ==
When the Simpsons' television set breaks, Marge tells her children how she and Homer met in a flashback. Marge and Homer were both high school seniors in 1974; one day, Homer and his best friend Barney earn detention after skipping class to smoke in the boys' bathroom. Unlike Homer, Marge is studious, but is also sent to detention for burning a bra at a feminist rally. Homer instantly falls in love with Marge on seeing her in the detention room. Despite his father's warning that he is aiming too high, Homer is determined to win Marge's heart.

To impress Marge, Homer joins her debate team, where he learns she is romantically interested in the more articulate Artie Ziff. Homer asks Marge to tutor him in French, and she accepts his invitation to the senior prom. However, when Homer confesses that he was not enrolled in French class and was only using the ruse to spend time with her, Marge scolds him for lying to her and making her needlessly stay awake late the night before an important debate tournament. She loses the debate to Artie, who asks her to be his prom date instead. Marge agrees. Homer, unaware of this, unexpectedly arrives at her house on prom night. When Artie arrives moments later, Homer despondently leaves and attends the prom alone.

Artie and Marge are crowned prom king and queen and share the first dance. Marge finds Homer crying in the hallway. He confesses his feelings for her, and, although sympathetic, she urges him to accept her love for Artie. At Inspiration Point after the prom, Artie tries to make out with Marge in the back seat of his car; when he tears her dress in a fit of passion, Marge slaps him and demands to be taken home, passing by Homer walking alone after he ran out of money to pay for his limousine rental. Realizing she is actually in love with Homer, and spurred on by overhearing her parents Clancy and Jacqueline criticize him, Marge returns in her car to pick him up and apologizes for the foolish mistake she made. Homer fixes the torn strap of her dress with the corsage he had bought for her, and tells Marge he will never be able to let her go, "and I never have". When the flashback ends, Homer and Marge kiss. Lisa and Maggie are touched, but Bart makes loud gagging noises in disgust.

== Production ==
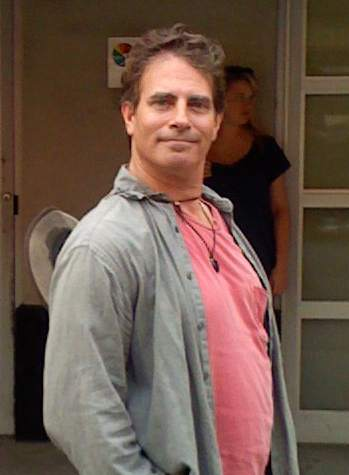
David Silverman directed "The Way We Was".

The episode was written by Al Jean, Mike Reiss, and Sam Simon, and directed by David Silverman. Jon Lovitz guest starred as Artie. It was his first guest appearance on The Simpsons, but he has appeared many times since. Artie's departing line to Marge after he drops her off was supposed to be "Good night. I'm Artie Ziff!", but short on time, the editors shortened it to just "Good night?"

Characters making their first appearance on the show in this episode are Wiseguy, Artie, Rainier Wolfcastle (as the fictional action hero McBain), Principal Dondelinger, and Marge's father Clancy Bouvier. Artie's appearance and body language is based on a man Silverman went to high school with named Mark Eisenberg. Silverman said that when he directed the episode, he went through his own high school yearbook for character ideas and designs because he also had attended high school in the seventies. Wolfcastle's voice and design was based on actor Arnold Schwarzenegger. The writers actually invented Wolfcastle for the episode "Oh Brother, Where Art Thou?", before "The Way We Was" went into production, but since "The Way We Was" aired before it is still considered his first appearance. The character was originally named McBain, after the film franchise he stars in. When the film McBain was released in 1991, after the episode had aired, the film's producers refused to allow the show to use the name in future episodes, so the name Rainier Wolfcastle, to represent the actor's real name, was created to use instead. Later, the use of the name McBain returned to the show.

"The Way We Was" originally aired on the Fox network in the United States on January 31, 1991. The episode was, together with "Homer vs. Lisa and the 8th Commandment", selected for release in a video collection titled The Best of The Simpsons, which was released May 26, 1998. The episode was also included on The Simpsons season two DVD set, which was released on August 6, 2002. Jean, Reiss, Silverman, Matt Groening, and James L. Brooks participated in the DVD's audio commentary. An action figure set based on the episode was released by Winning Moves. It featured the characters Homer, Marge, Artie, Barney, Grampa, Patty, and Selma, all in their flashback designs. In April 2002, as part of an EB Games exclusive, action figures of Marge and Homer in their prom outfits were released by Playmates Toys. An action figure of Artie was also released in June 2004 as part of the wave sixteen release of the World of Springfield series of action figures by Playmates Toys.

== Cultural references ==
William Shakespeare is referenced in the episode.

The television show that the Simpson family watches at the beginning of the episode, in which the two reviewers discuss the latest McBain film, is a parody of the American television series Siskel & Ebert & the Movies. In the flashback sequence, Homer is seen singing along to the 1973 song "The Joker" by the Steve Miller Band while driving to school, which he also sings during the end credits. Pink Floyd and Led Zeppelin posters hang on the wall of Homer's 1974 bedroom. The 1970 song "(They Long to Be) Close to You" by The Carpenters is heard when Homer sees Marge for the first time. Homer eats a bucket of Shakespeare Fried Chicken when he reveals his feelings towards Marge to Grampa. At the debate, Homer disagrees about the idea of lowering the United States national speed limit to 55 mph (89 km/h), arguing that "Sure, it'll save a few lives, but millions will be late!" This is a reference to the National Maximum Speed Law provision of the 1974 Emergency Highway Energy Conservation Act, which (at the time) prohibited speed limits higher than 55 everywhere. Barney asks a girl named Estelle if she wants to go to the prom with him, but she tells him she would not go to the prom with him even if he were American actor Elliott Gould. Artie says he can think of a dozen highly cogent arguments to why Marge should accept his prom offer, one of which is from a Time magazine titled "America's Love Affair with the Prom: Even wallflowers can look forward to one date a year." Songs played in the episode include "The Streak" by Ray Stevens, "Goodbye Yellow Brick Road" by Elton John, "Colour My World" by Chicago, "Pick Up the Pieces" by Average White Band, and "The Hustle" by Van McCoy. Marge's car is an AMC Gremlin.

== Reception ==
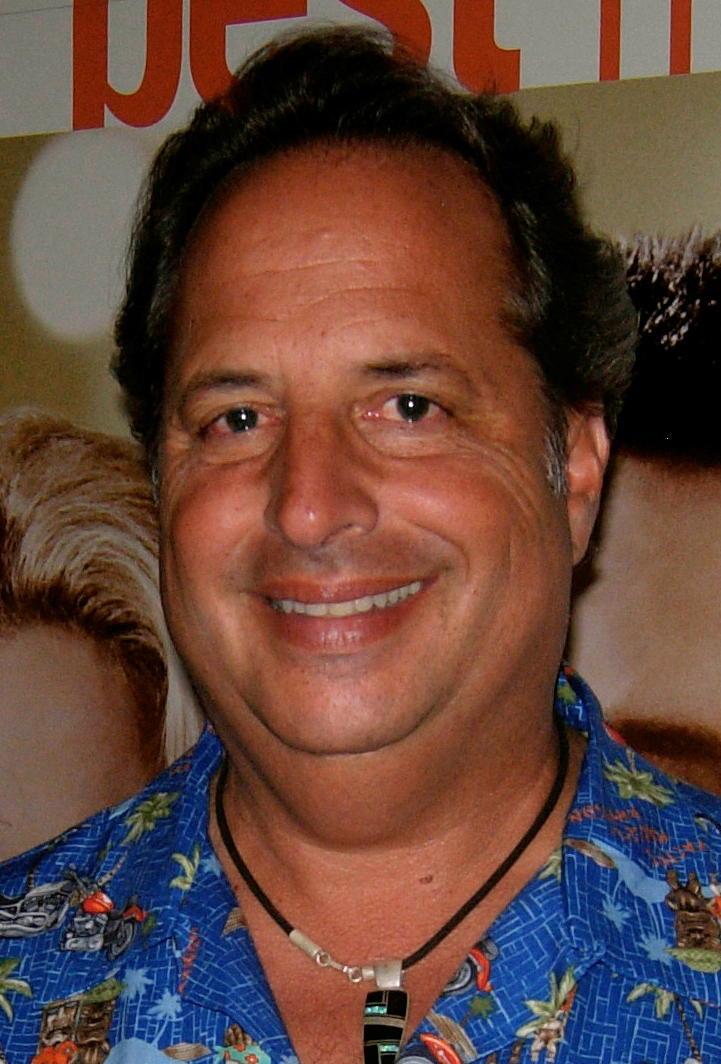
Jon Lovitz was praised for his guest appearance as Artie Ziff.

In its original broadcast, "The Way We Was" finished sixteenth in the ratings for the week of January 28 – February 3, 1991, with a Nielsen rating of 15.6, equivalent to 14.5 million viewing households. It was the highest-rated show on Fox that week.

Since airing, the episode has received positive reviews from television critics. In 1998, TV Guide listed it in its list of top twelve Simpsons episodes, calling it "a superbly observant, hilarious, perfect time capsule that tells how Homer Simpson wooed and somehow won Marge Bouvier". The authors of the book I Can't Believe It's a Bigger and Better Updated Unofficial Simpsons Guide, Gary Russell and Gareth Roberts, wrote: "A superb episode. Some colorful background for Homer and Marge (and a glimpse of Homer and Barney's schooldays) plus our introduction to the world of the McBain films. Excellent."

DVD Movie Guide's Colin Jacobson thought the episode was a "fine program", and added that Lovitz made Artie "amusingly annoying". Jacobson thought the episode captured the "tone of the mid-seventies with warmth and insight", and the courtship "seemed charming but not sappy, and the show worked well overall". Jacobson's favorite line of the episode was Grampa's advice to Homer about Marge, "Oh, son, don't overreach! Go for the dented car, the dead-end job, the less attractive girl!"

Dawn Taylor of The DVD Journal thought the best lines of the episode were when Homer arrives at the Bouvier house to pick up Marge for the prom, Selma tells Patty "Marge's dates get homelier all the time," to which Patty replies "That's what you get when you don't put out." IGN ranked Lovitz as the eighth-best guest star in the show's history. In his book Drawn to Television – Prime-time Animation from the Flintstones to Family Guy, Keith Booker wrote: "The episode details in a rather sentimental fashion the early struggles of the irresponsible Homer to support his new family [...] Such background episodes add an extra dimension to the portrayal of the animated Simpson family, making them seem oddly real and adding weight to their status as a family with a long history together."
