= Lisa's Substitute =

- The Simpsons episode
- Episode no.: Season 2 Episode 19
- Directed by: Rich Moore
- Written by: Jon Vitti
- Production code: 7F19
- Original air date: April 25, 1991

Guest appearances
- Marcia Wallace as Edna Krabappel; Dustin Hoffman as Mr. Bergstrom (credited as Sam Etic)

Episode features
- Couch gag: The Simpsons run in, only to discover the couch is missing.
- Commentary: Matt Groening; Jon Vitti; Al Jean; Mike Reiss; Rich Moore

Episode chronology
← Previous "Brush with Greatness"	Next → "The War of the Simpsons"
- The Simpsons season 2

"Lisa's Substitute" is the nineteenth episode of the second season of the American animated television series The Simpsons. It originally aired on Fox in the United States on April 25, 1991. In the episode, Lisa's teacher Miss Hoover takes medical leave due to what she thinks is Lyme disease. Lisa finds the teaching methods of the substitute teacher, Mr. Bergstrom, inspiring and discovers a renewed love for learning. When Miss Hoover returns to class, Lisa is devastated to lose her most positive adult role model. Eventually, she realizes that while Mr. Bergstrom was one of a kind, she can find role models in other people, including her father Homer. Meanwhile, Bart runs for class president against Martin.

The episode was written by Jon Vitti and directed by Rich Moore. It is the first episode of the show to have the opening sequence start at the driveway scene. Dustin Hoffman, using the pseudonym Sam Etic, guest stars as Mr. Bergstrom, who was modeled on the physical appearance of Mike Reiss, a longtime writer and producer on the show. The episode features cultural references to Mike Nichols's film The Graduate, which starred Hoffman, and the novel Charlotte's Web by E. B. White.

Since airing, the episode has received universal acclaim from fans and television critics, and it is one of the most celebrated episodes in the show's history, being regarded by many as the best episode of the series. It acquired a Nielsen rating of 11.1, and was the highest-rated show on Fox the week it aired.

== Plot ==
Lisa's teacher, Miss Hoover, announces to her class that she has Lyme disease, and is taking a leave of absence for the rest of the year. She is soon replaced by a substitute teacher, Mr. Bergstrom. When Mr. Bergstrom shows up for his first day teaching Lisa's class, he is dressed as a cowboy and pretends he is in Texas in 1830, and asks the students to name three historical inaccuracies on his costume. Lisa is able to name four historical inaccuracies, and Mr. Bergstrom is impressed by Lisa's knowledge of his deliberate anachronisms; he rewards her with his cowboy hat. Due to Mr. Bergstrom's unorthodox teaching methods and friendly nature, Lisa begins to look up to him. When Lisa and Homer are visiting a museum, they run into Mr. Bergstrom, and Lisa becomes embarrassed when Homer displays his ignorance. Sensing a void in Lisa and Homer's relationship, Mr. Bergstrom takes Homer aside to suggest he be a more positive role model.

At Marge's suggestion, Lisa goes to invite Mr. Bergstrom to dinner at their home, but is devastated to find Miss Hoover back (it turns out her Lyme disease was psychosomatic) and Mr. Bergstrom gone. Lisa rushes to Mr. Bergstrom's apartment and learns he has accepted a new job in Capital City. She rushes to the train station when Mr. Bergstrom is about to board, and tearfully tells him she will be lost without him. Mr. Bergstrom replies that the life of a substitute teacher is transient, and he has to help students who need him most. He writes her a note and tells her any time she feels alone, its contents are all she needs to know. He boards the train and departs as Lisa reads the written note, "You are Lisa Simpson".

Meanwhile, Bart's class prepares to elect a class president. Mrs. Krabappel nominates Martin, while Sherri and Terri nominate Bart. During a debate with Martin, Bart tells jokes and wins the class over. Certain of his own victory, Bart holds a premature victory party during recess, but he finds out that the majority of students in his class – including himself – did not vote at all, giving Martin the victory with just two votes.

That night at the Simpsons' dinner table, Lisa is visibly devastated by Mr. Bergstrom's departure. When Homer responds dismissively to her problems, she lashes out and calls him a "baboon." Homer is initially confused and offended until Marge calls him out on his insensitivity. Homer makes up with Lisa by claiming he has never lost anyone special, and then cheers her up by mimicking a monkey. Lisa apologizes and they share a hug. Finding Bart seething over the election result, Homer comforts him by pointing out that being class president would have involved extra work with little reward. Homer then sees Maggie is crying because she dropped her pacifier, and returns it to her. When Homer goes back downstairs, Marge begins to ask if he made up with Lisa, but he interrupts her and says, "Don't say anything, Marge. Let's just go to bed. I'm on the biggest roll of my life."

== Production ==
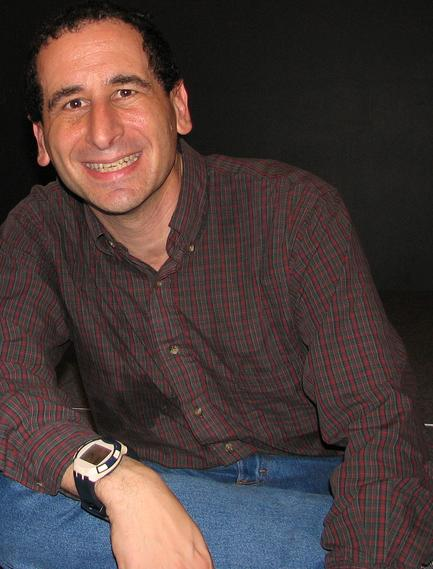
Mr. Bergstrom was modeled on the physical appearance of Mike Reiss.

"Lisa's Substitute" was written by Jon Vitti and directed by Rich Moore. According to Vitti, The Simpsons producer James L. Brooks contributed more to this episode than he did to any other in the show's history. Vitti said the episode was "very controversial" when it was being made because it "came at a point when the staff were just beginning to realize the comedy potential of the show, but we were trapped with these love stories, and just as the staff were starting to get frustrated with the love stories, along came 'Lisa's Substitute': the biggest, huggiest, warmest and fuzziest of them all."

Mr. Bergstrom was modeled on the physical appearance of Mike Reiss, a longtime writer and producer on the show. Dustin Hoffman provided the voice of Mr. Bergstrom. Hoffman was not sure if he wanted to be identified with a cartoon show at the time, like many early guest stars on The Simpsons, and therefore used the pseudonym Sam Etic in the closing credits. Sam Etic is a play on the word Semitic, alluding to the fact that both Hoffman and Mr. Bergstrom are Jewish. Brooks suggested the pseudonym, which Hoffman immediately liked. The cast flew to New York to record the episode with Hoffman and were directed by Brooks. Yeardley Smith, who provides the voice of Lisa, said she grew as an actress after working with Hoffman that day. The Simpsons writer Al Jean said he remembered when the audio track came back, Hoffman's voice was too low on the singing parts. The staff were "petrified" that the singing scenes would not show up on air, so they had Hoffman re-record them when he was in Los Angeles. Vitti said the note Lisa receives from Mr. Bergstrom should have had an exclamation point at the end. He did not notice it in the animatic, and it still "haunts [him] to this day".

== Cultural references ==
Mrs. Krabappel trying to seduce Mr. Bergstrom is a reference to the predicament of Hoffman's character in the 1967 film The Graduate. Mr. Bergstrom reads a line from the 1952 novel Charlotte's Web to his class. It is implied that this line is the end of the book, but in reality another chapter follows. Vitti said they could not feature more than a line from the book without being sued. The staff contacted a relative of the author E. B. White, but she would not clear the use of the book. When Lisa arrives at Mr. Bergstrom's apartment building, a list of tenants can be seen, including J. Vitti (the episode's writer Jon Vitti) and J. Kamerman (then-animator Jen Kamerman). When Bart unexpectedly loses to Martin in the class president race, a picture of Martin holding a copy of The Daily Fourth Gradian with the headline "Simpson Defeats Prince" is taken, which in turn ends up on the front page of The Daily Fourth Gradian under the headline "Prince Beats Simpson". This is a reference to the famous picture of former President Harry S. Truman holding a copy of a prematurely printed edition of the Chicago Tribune that proclaimed "Dewey Defeats Truman", taken the day after his unexpected victory over Thomas E. Dewey in 1948.

== Reception ==
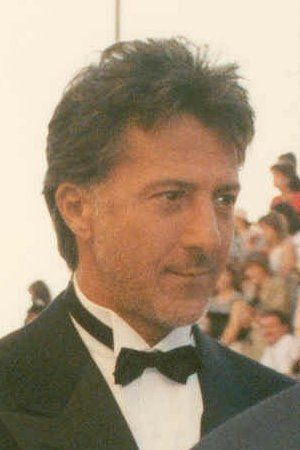
Dustin Hoffman was praised by critics for his role as Mr. Bergstrom.

In its original broadcast, "Lisa's Substitute" finished 43rd in the ratings for the week of April 22–28, 1991, with a Nielsen Rating of 11.1, equivalent to approximately ten million viewing households. It was the highest-rated show on Fox that week.

Since airing, the episode has received universal acclaim from fans and television critics, with many regarding it as the best episode of the series. Gary Russell and Gareth Roberts, authors of I Can't Believe It's a Bigger and Better Updated Unofficial Simpsons Guide, said "Despite a scene-stealing performance from M[r]s. Krabappel, this is Lisa's show. Mr Bergstrom's last message for Lisa is a delightful touch and adds the finishing touch to a wonderful episode." Former TV Squad blogger Adam Finley named "Lisa's Substitute" as one of his top 14 most touching Simpsons episodes, and The Simpsons Archive webmaster Jouni Paakkinen rated the episode as his third favorite.

Colin Jacobson of DVD Movie Guide said that Lisa episodes "tend to be goopy", but "Lisa's Substitute" seemed like "a good show, however". He went on to say, "The show offered many other good moments, and it helped expand the Lisa/Homer relationship neatly. The Bart's election subplot punctured any sappiness that otherwise might have occurred. [...] 'Lisa's Substitute' offered a fairly solid program." Emily VanDerWerff of Slant Magazine picked the episode as the show's second best, praising its emotion and Hoffman's performance.

Hoffman has been praised for his guest appearance as Mr. Bergstrom. Entertainment Weekly named it one of the 16 greatest guest appearances on The Simpsons. In 2007, Simon Crerar of The Times listed his performance as one of the 33 funniest cameos in the history of the show. The episode's reference to The Graduate was named the 20th greatest film reference in the history of the show by Total Film's Nathan Ditum. Ditum also ranked Hoffman's performance as the 16th best guest appearance in the show's history.

"Lisa's Substitute" is also highly regarded among the show's cast and crew. Bart's voice actress, Nancy Cartwright, said it is one of her top three episodes, along with "Bart Sells His Soul" and "Bart the Mother", while writer Al Jean said the episode was his favorite sentimental episode. Yeardley Smith, the voice actress of Lisa, has mentioned this episode is one of her favorite Simpsons episodes of all time. Dan Castellaneta, the voice of Homer, named it his favorite episode of the show together with "Simpson and Delilah" and "Homer the Heretic". Executive producer James L. Brooks said he thinks "Lisa's Substitute" stands out because it is The Simpsons' "best show" with a message behind it. In 2005, former writer Greg Daniels referred to this episode as his favorite. In 2016, long time director Mark Kirkland named the episode as his favorite during a Reddit "Ask Me Anything" chat. When The Simpsons began streaming on Disney+ in 2019, former Simpsons writer and executive producer Bill Oakley named this one of the best classic Simpsons episodes to watch on the service.
