= Joey Miyashima =

American television and film actor (born 1957)

- Born: November 18, 1957 (age 68); Los Angeles, California, U.S.
- Occupation: Actor
- Years active: 1985–present

Joseph Paul Miyashima (born November 18, 1957) is an American television and film actor.

== Early life and family ==
Miyashima was born in Los Angeles to Japanese parents on November 18, 1957.

He grew up with many siblings surrounding him in a loving home

He has 3 cousins named Lisa Stucki Mark Hansen and Brian Hansen

He later worked at Waterford school in Sandy Utah, to become a soccer coach

== Career ==
Miyashima played Pee-wee Herman's Japanese pen pal, Oki Doki, in "Accidental Playhouse", an episode of Pee-Wee's Playhouse. He had a role in an episode ("9 Minutes and 52 Seconds Over Tokyo") of The Tracey Ullman Show, and another in its spin-off, The Simpsons, as the voice of Toshiro, the apprentice chef, in the episode called "One Fish, Two Fish, Blowfish, Blue Fish". In 2006, he played the role of Principal Dave Matsui in the Disney Channel Original Movie High School Musical, and reprised it in High School Musical 3: Senior Year (2008). In 2009 he had a cameo as a police officer in the DCOM Dadnapped.

== Filmography ==
=== Film ===
Year	Film	Role	Notes
1985	Stand Alone	Japanese Soldier #2	
1986	The Karate Kid Part II	Toshio	

=== Television ===
Year	Title	Role	Notes
1988	The Tracey Ullman Show	Marty Jr.	Episode: "9 Minutes and 52 Seconds Over Tokyo"
1988	Police Story: The Watch Commander	Niko	
1989	Doogie Howser, M.D.	Orderly	Television series (Episode "Doogie the Red-Nosed Reindeer")
1989	The Runnin' Kind	Eddie	
1989	Mother, Mother	Dale Short	
1989	The Karate Kid	Additional Characters (voice)	TV Series
1990	Bad Influence	Man at Tar Pit	
1990	Partners in Life	Police Assistant Morty Wong	Television movie
1990	True Colors	Delivery Person	Television series (Episode "Pilot")
1990	Pee-wee's Playhouse	Oki Doki	Television series (Episode "Accidental Playhouse")
1991	The Simpsons	Toshiro	Television series (Episode "One Fish, Two Fish, Blowfish, Blue Fish") voice
1991	Defending Your Life	Casio tipster	
1991	Reasonable Doubts	Dr. Brown	Television series (Episodes "Pilot" and "Hard Bargains")
1993	Rising Sun	Young Japanese Negotiator	
1995	Behind the Waterfall	E.R. Doctor Xiao	
1995	In the Shadow of Evil	Dr. Neilsen	Television movie
1995	Whose Daughter Is She?	Resident Doctor Wong	
1996	Terror in the Family	Attorney	
1996	Unabomber: The True Story	Man	Television movie
1996	The Paper Brigade	Milkman	
1997	In My Sister's Shadow	Uniformed Cop #1	Television movie
1997	Night Sins	Doctor Lomax	Television movie
1997	Dying to Belong	Police #1	Television movie
1997	Mother Knows Best	Bill Yamazaki	Television movie
1997	Detention: The Siege at Johnson High	Mr. Braddock	Television movie
1997	Con Air	Tech Guy	
1997	Dead by Midnight	Mr. Charles Mizoguchi	Television movie
1998	Meet the Deedles	Man	
1998	No Laughing Matter	Worker	Television movie
1999	A Secret Life	Man	Television movie
1999	The Substitute 3: Winner Takes All	ER Doctor Li	
1999	The Runner	Dr. Jack Andrews	
1999	Absence of the Good	Childress	Television movie
1999	Touched by an Angel	Steve Wong	Television series (Episodes "The Whole Truth and Nothing But..." and "Jagged Edges")
1999	The Test of Love	Man	Television movie
2000	The Crow: Salvation	Radio Guard	
2000	The Huntress	Ken Mitoguchi	Television series (Episode "Pilot")
2001	Dumb Luck	Agent Kurumada	
2001	Little Secrets	Dr. Mezzie	
2001	I Saw Mommy Kissing Santa Claus	Mr. Weber	
2002	Double Teamed	Wendall Yoshida	Television movie
2002	Firestarter 2: Rekindled	Registrar Secretary	Television movie
2003	Right on Track	Mr. Jones	Television movie
2003	Everwood	Dr. Friesen	Television series (Episode "Vegetative State")
2004	Paradise	Johnny Kim	Television movie
2004	Benji: Off the Leash!	Vet	
2005	Down and Derby	Kyosho Yakimoto	
2005	ER	Deputy One	Television series (Episode "Cañon City")
2006	High School Musical	Principal Matsui	Television movie
2006	Blind Dating	Dr. Tony Sato	
2007	American Pastime	Dissident	
2007	Moving McAllister	Japanese Man	
2008	High School Musical 3: Senior Year	Principal Matsui	
2008	Forever Strong	Lawyer	
2009	Dadnapped	Cop	Television movie
2012	12 Dogs of Christmas: Great Puppy Rescue	Officer Jack	
2013	Storm Rider	Sheriff Kikuchi	
2014	Jackie & Ryan	Alfred	
2015	H8RZ	Detective Wataru Fujisawa	
2015	Being Charlie	Party Leader	
2017	Small Town Crime	Dealership Owner	
2017	6 Below: Miracle on the Mountain	Guard	
2017	The Landlord	Detective Ramsey	
2018	Youth & Consequences	Teacher	
2018	Hawaii Five-0	Crew Chief	
2018	Time Freak	Professor	
2019	Christmas Hotel	Investor #1	
2019	Side Effect	Tommy	
2020	The Night Clerk	Ron Benson	
2020	Little Miss Strawberry	Grampa	
