= Two Cars in Every Garage and Three Eyes on Every Fish =

- The Simpsons episode
- Episode no.: Season 2 Episode 4
- Directed by: Wesley Archer
- Written by: Sam Simon & John Swartzwelder
- Production code: 7F01
- Original air date: November 1, 1990

Episode features
- Chalkboard gag: "I will not Xerox my butt"
- Couch gag: The couch springs out like a bed.
- Commentary: Matt Groening; Al Jean; Mike Reiss

Episode chronology
← Previous "Treehouse of Horror"	Next → "Dancin' Homer"
- The Simpsons season 2

"Two Cars in Every Garage and Three Eyes on Every Fish" is the fourth episode of the second season of the American animated television series The Simpsons. It is actually the first episode of that season in the production order. It originally aired on Fox in the United States on November 1, 1990. In the episode, Bart catches a three-eyed fish in a river downstream of the Springfield Nuclear Power Plant. After an inspection of the plant reveals numerous safety violations, Mr. Burns runs for governor to prevent the plant from being closed. The night before the election, Burns has a televised dinner with the Simpson family to show his appeal to the common voter. Marge sabotages Burns' political stunt and dooms his campaign by serving him the head of the three-eyed fish.

The episode was written by Sam Simon and John Swartzwelder, and directed by Wes Archer. It was the first episode produced for season two and was intended to air as the season premiere, but was replaced with "Bart Gets an 'F'" due to Bart's popularity in the early 1990s. The episode features cultural references to several American films, mostly the 1941 film Citizen Kane, with Burns in the role of the character Charles Foster Kane. Mary Bailey shares her name with George Bailey's wife in the 1946 film It's a Wonderful Life.

Journalists have described the episode as a satire on both American politics and environmentalism. It won an Environmental Media Award in 1991 for being the best television episode of the year with an environmental message. Since the episode first aired, the three-eyed fish Blinky has been mentioned several times in news articles regarding nuclear waste and mutation.

The episode was positively received by television critics for its satire on American politics. It acquired a Nielsen rating of 15.8, and was the highest-rated show on the Fox network the week it aired.

== Plot ==
Bart and Lisa go fishing downstream of the Springfield Nuclear Power Plant. Springfield Shopper reporter Dave Shutton arrives just as Bart catches a three-eyed fish. After the fish, nicknamed Blinky by the media, makes headlines, the incumbent governor Mary Bailey sends a government inspection team to the plant, suspecting nuclear waste may have caused the mutation. The plant's owner, Mr. Burns, is presented with a list of 342 violations which will cost $56 million (equivalent to $138 million in 2025) to rectify. Distraught, Mr. Burns takes up Homer's suggestion that he run for governor to prevent the plant from being closed.

Mr. Burns' political advisers inform him that he is greatly despised by most people, while Bailey is beloved by all. To quell the controversy over Blinky, Mr. Burns appears on television with an actor portraying Charles Darwin who claims Blinky is an evolutionary leap, not a "hideous genetic mutation". After Mr. Burns vows to lower taxes and runs a smear campaign against Bailey, his campaign ties hers in the polls. Mr. Burns' advisers suggest that he have dinner at the home of one of his employees the night before the election. After scanning the plant's video monitors for the most average man he can find, Mr. Burns chooses Homer.

The upcoming dinner with Mr. Burns divides the Simpson household. With Homer supporting Mr. Burns' campaign simply to not antagonize his boss, Marge and Lisa are appalled that Homer has allowed Burns to use their home as a campaign tool. For dinner, Marge stuns Mr. Burns' campaign team and the media alike by serving Blinky, placing the fish's head on Mr. Burns's plate. Unable to swallow the fish, Mr. Burns spits it out. Cameras flash as the expelled bite flies through the air and hits the floor, dooming his gubernatorial campaign. Bailey wins the election, and Mr. Burns destroys some of the Simpsons' furnishings in a fit of rage. Mr. Burns attempts to flip over a table, but is unable to do so. He asks Mr. Smithers for help to flip the table over. Mr. Burns warns that he will ensure Homer's dreams will go unfulfilled as long as he lives. However, Marge happily reassures Homer that his ambitions are so meagre nobody could possibly thwart them.

== Production ==
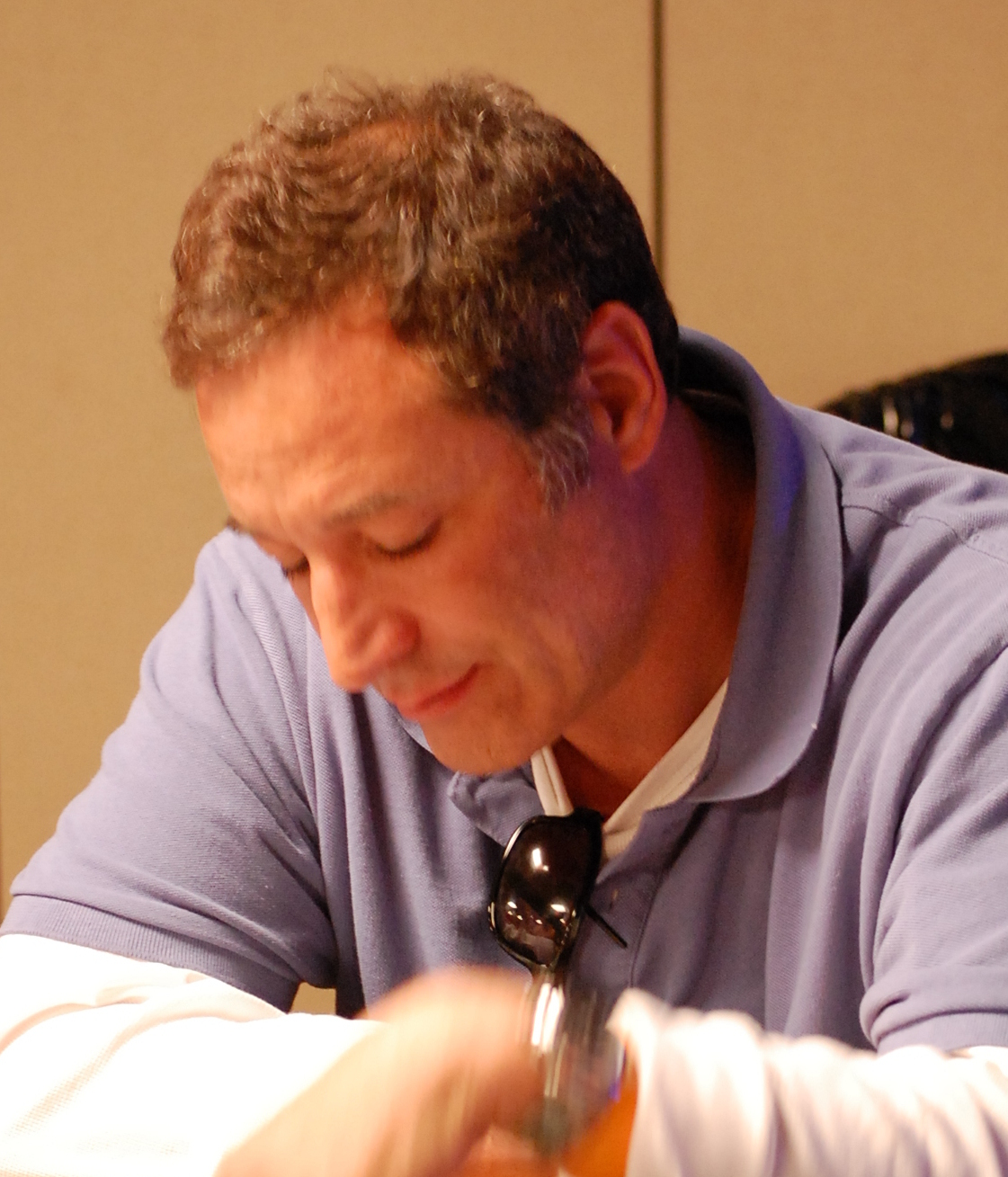
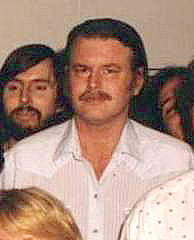
Sam Simon (left) and John Swartzwelder (right) were co-writers for this episode.

The episode was written by Sam Simon and John Swartzwelder, and directed by Wes Archer. Blinky had previously made a brief appearance in the season one episode "Homer's Odyssey", in which he was seen swimming in the lake outside the plant. The writers liked the design of the fish and decided to devote an episode to him.

Mary Bailey and Springfield Shopper reporter Dave Shutton made their first appearance on the show in this episode. Dave Shutton, voiced by Harry Shearer, was named after a friend of Swartzwelder. Dave Shutton's roles have since become less relevant and have been reduced to cameos and appearances in crowd scenes. Mary Bailey would later appear briefly in episodes such as "Bart vs. Lisa vs. the Third Grade" and "The Seven-Beer Snitch". Nancy Cartwright ad-libs Bart's blasphemous prayer at the dinner with Mr. Burns (which takes place during the episode's climax) and she records it in one take. It was so funny that the crew was laughing during the prayer, and immediately after she finished, Cartwright and the rest of the voice cast also broke into uncontrollable laughter. Producer Matt Groening says it was fortunate she could do it in one take, as a second would have been impossible to do.

During The Tracey Ullman Show and the first season of The Simpsons, Bart quickly became one of the most popular characters on television in what was termed "Bartmania". Due to the success of the first season, the Fox network decided to switch The Simpsons' timeslot in hopes that it would steal ratings from NBC's "powerhouse" line up. The show was moved from its 8:00 p.m. EST Sunday night slot to the same time on Thursday, where it would compete with NBC's The Cosby Show, the number one show at the time. "Two Cars in Every Garage and Three Eyes on Every Fish" was the first episode produced for the second season, but "Bart Gets an 'F'" aired first because of Bart's popularity and the producers wanted to premiere with an episode involving him in hopes of stealing viewers from The Cosby Show.

== Cultural references ==
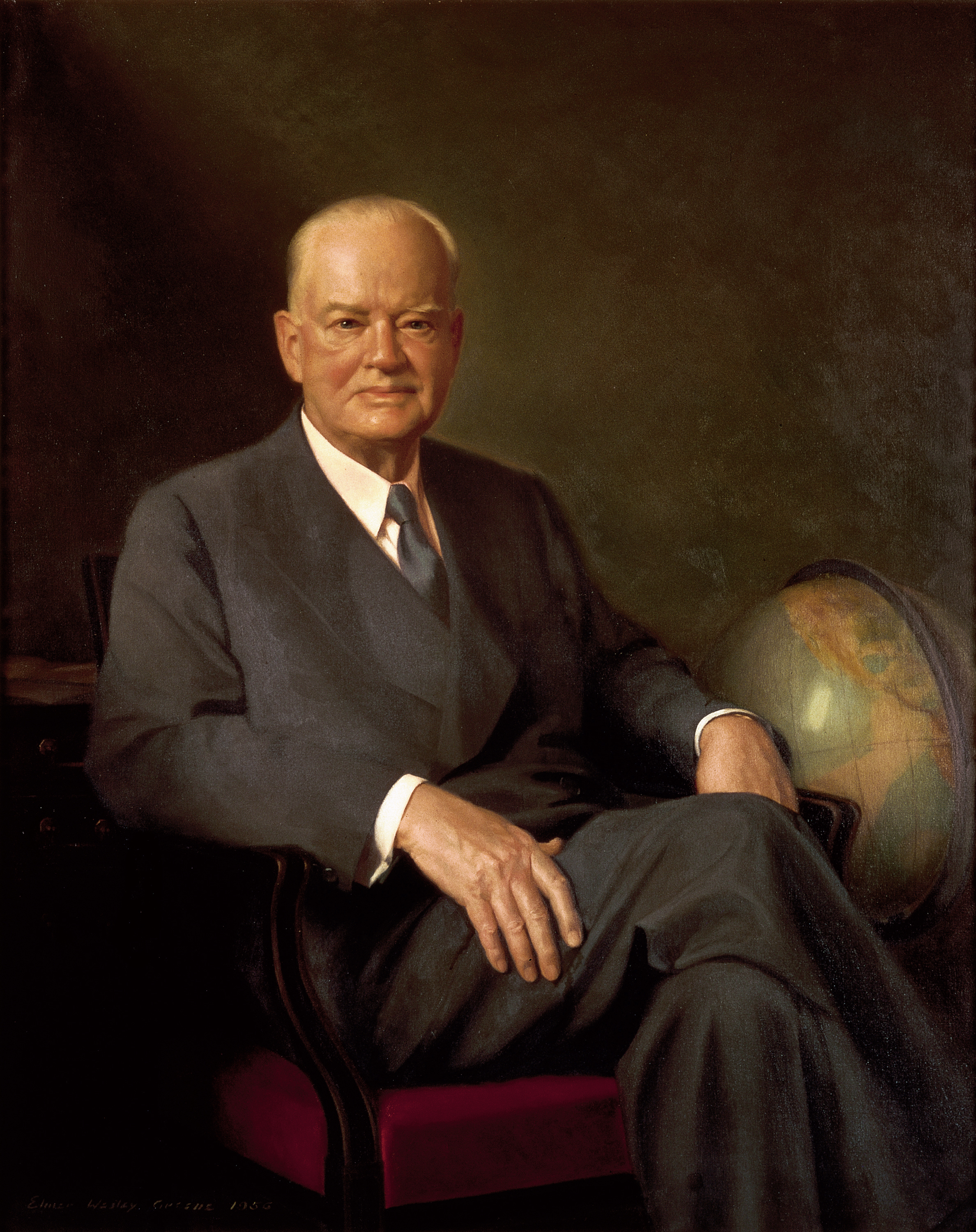
The episode's title parodies Herbert Hoover's (pictured) 1928 presidential campaign.

The name of the episode comes from the slogan in a political advert used in Herbert Hoover's presidential campaign in 1928, "A Chicken in Every Pot", which the advert later amplifies with "And a car in every backyard, to boot.". Several parts of the episode are inspired by the 1941 film Citizen Kane, all with Mr. Burns in the role of Charles Foster Kane. The campaign rally scene where Burns speaks in front of a giant poster of himself is a reference to a scene from that film. The scene where Burns trashes the Simpson family's dining room after the dinner is similar to the scene in which Kane destroys his ex-wife's room. Mary Bailey shares her name with George Bailey's wife in the 1946 film It's a Wonderful Life. Burns hires an actor to portray the nineteenth-century scientist Charles Darwin to help in his claim that the three-eyed fish was the result of evolution. Darwin was a naturalist who presented compelling evidence that all species of life have evolved over time from common ancestors, through the process he called natural selection. The clip of Burns driving a military tank in his campaign montage is similar to a clip featured in Michael Dukakis's 1988 United States presidential campaign, in which he can be seen driving a tank. A re-run of the episode that aired on June 25, 1992, included a new chalkboard gag in the opening credits that featured Bart writing "It's potato, not potatoe" on the chalkboard. This is a reference to a spelling blunder by the then-Vice President of the United States Dan Quayle, who corrected a student's correct spelling of "potato" to "potatoe" at an elementary school spelling bee in Trenton, New Jersey, on June 15, 1992.

== Themes and impact ==
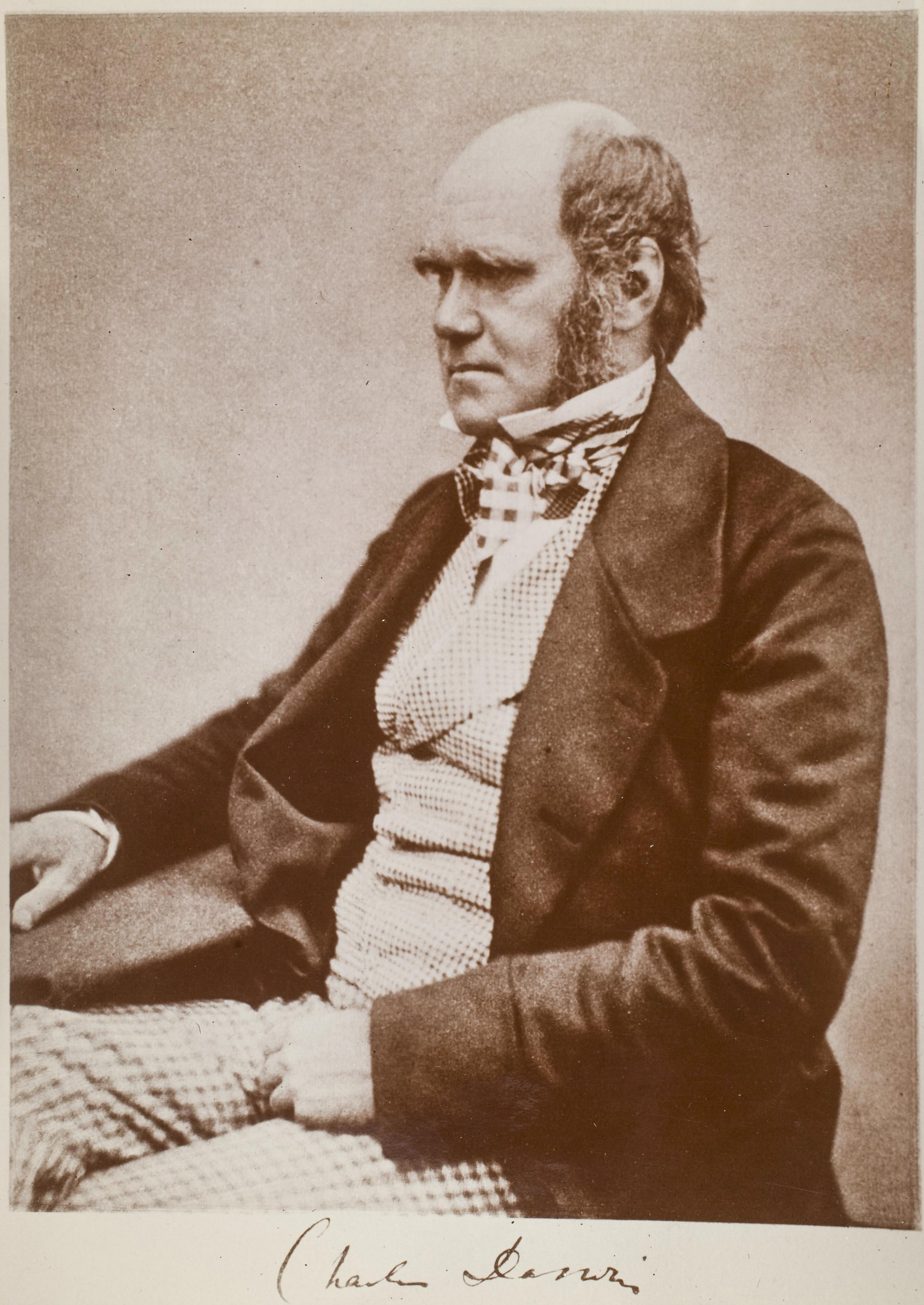
Naturalist Charles Darwin's theory of natural selection is mentioned in the episode.

Journalists have described "Two Cars in Every Garage and Three Eyes on Every Fish" as a satire on American politics. Joanne Ostrow, a reviewer for The Denver Post, said only a cartoon could get away with "such pointed satire" of American political campaigning and advertising that is featured in the episode. She compared it to the "counter-cultural posture" television shows such as Second City Television and Saturday Night Live took in the mid-1970s: "In those days, this sort of alternative viewpoint was kept out of prime time. [In The Simpsons case], it's still relegated to the (distant) fourth network, but at least the time is prime." Jeremy Kleinman of DVD Talk wrote: "The writers of The Simpsons have often come across as unabashedly liberal and this episode is no exception as political/social commentary takes a step closer to the foreground during this episode." Al Jean, current show runner of The Simpsons, has himself admitted in an interview that the show is of a "liberal bent". In the DVD commentaries, creator Matt Groening and the majority of people who work on the show state several times that they are very liberal, but some, such as John Swartzwelder (one of the writers of this and many other The Simpsons episodes), are libertarian. The show portrays government and large corporations as callous entities that take advantage of the common worker. Thus, the writers often portray authority figures in an unflattering or negative light. In The Simpsons, politicians are corrupt, ministers such as Reverend Lovejoy are indifferent to churchgoers, and the local police force is incompetent.

The episode also features an environmentalism theme. This theme is present in the nuclear power plant's polluting Lake Springfield, which causes the fish in the lake to mutate. University of the Sciences in Philadelphia physics and mathematics professor Paul Halpern discussed the episode in his book What's Science Ever Done for Us?: What the Simpsons Can Teach Us About Physics, Robots, Life, and the Universe. He comments: "Considering the fact that [Charles Darwin's theory of] natural selection takes generations and that successful varieties must sustain a survival advantage over others, the only way Mr. Burns can prove his assertion [that the fish is the next step in evolution through natural selection] is by tracking Blinky over time to see if the third eye allows the mutant fish to find food more quickly or dodge predators." Mark Meister and Phyllis M. Japp discuss the environmental theme of the episode in their book Enviropop: Studies in Environmental Rhetoric and Popular Culture. The authors think human pollution is characterized in the episode as an improvement on nature, and human progress is viewed as an "integral" part of human evolution. They add: "These references articulate specific criticism of current environmental regulations, specifically the lax enforcement of the regulations concerning the dumping, safe storage, and disposal of nuclear waste. Furthermore, this episode condemns the manipulation of political and economic power to disguise ecological accountability and to shift blame for environmental problems." The authors also say the episode comments on the lack of adherence to safety standards for the plant, and criticizes the "apathetic acceptance" of unforced environmental inspections. In addition, they comment that the episode "explicitly criticizes media spin-doctors who distort the impacts of ecological degradation caused by wealthy corporations such as the nuclear power plant."

On February 13, 1991, a local group in Albany, New York, fought the government's plan to create a nuclear waste dump in their neighborhood. It was staged by Citizens Against Radioactive Dumping (CARD) at the monthly meeting of the Low-Level Radioactive Waste Siting Commission in Albany. Here four children dressed up as Homer, Marge, Bart, and Lisa, and presented a three-eyed fabric fish, which looked like Blinky, to the commission. In addition to that they performed a rap song, which explained the plot of the episode.

Since the episode's initial airing, Blinky has been mentioned several times in news articles regarding nuclear waste and mutation. A reporter for the Lincoln Journal Star compared Blinky to a rainbow trout with two mouths caught in Lincoln, Nebraska, in 2005. The fish was mentioned in a National Review article discussing a legislation which would make it illegal to import, possess or release alive into California any live transgenic fish: "Sounds like someone watched one too many episodes of The Simpsons with Blinky, the three-eyed fish that swims by the nuclear-power plant." Matt Smith of SF Weekly compared Blinky to a type of fish found in San Francisco Bay, which, according to a study by the University of California, Davis, had a shrunken brain and misshapen body that had been caused by the dumping of toxic chemicals into the bay. In an article about the now closed nuclear weapons production facility Rocky Flats Plant, Brian Park of The Rocky Mountain Collegian joked that after its closure, "years of cleanup ensued and now the area is a wildlife refuge; no word yet if Blinky has been spotted." Barbara Taormina of the North Shore Sunday wrote in her article about the new liquefied natural gas (LNG) pipeline in Massachusetts Bay: "Will Blinky, the mutant three-eyed fish from The Simpsons be showing up in Massachusetts Bay? Probably not, but local environmentalists are worried that digging for the new LNG pipeline may stir up radioactive waste dumped decades ago." In his article about the nuclear power plant operator Exelon, Thomas M. Anderson of Kiplinger wrote: "The thought of more nuclear power may conjure up images of the Three Mile Island accident or Blinky [...], but a growing number of policymakers and even environmentalists are coming to appreciate the advantages of atomic energy." The episode was mentioned when a three-eyed Atlantic wolffish was caught in 2011 in Córdoba, Argentina near a local nuclear power plant.

== Reception ==
In its original broadcast, "Two Cars in Every Garage and Three Eyes on Every Fish" finished nineteenth in the ratings for the week of October 29–November 4, 1990, with a Nielsen rating of 15.8, equivalent to approximately 14.7 million viewing households. The Simpsons was the highest-rated show on Fox that week, but was beaten by The Cosby Show which got a 20.2 rating. The episode won an Environmental Media Award in the "Best Television Episodic Comedy" category, which has been awarded every year since 1991 to the best television episode with an environmental message. It was The Simpsons first Environmental Media Award, but the show has won six more since then.

The episode has received mostly positive reviews from television critics since airing. The authors of the book I Can't Believe It's a Bigger and Better Updated Unofficial Simpsons Guide, Gary Russell and Gareth Roberts, called the episode a "superb example" of political satire, "demonstrating the lengths people will go to to win votes. Marge, of course, sees straight through Burns and uses Blinky the three-eyed fish to demonstrate his lack of conviction." Phil Rosenthal of the Los Angeles Daily News called the episode a "wonderful stab" at American politics and the "media machine that drives it", and added: "The message is so subtle, the makers of The Simpsons might deny it is there at all for fear of turning off a portion of its audience. Truth is, you may very well be so busy laughing and taking in the fine details, such as the references to Citizen Kane, to notice."

Hal Boedeker of The Miami Herald said the episode took "some well-aimed satirical jabs at American politics and the publics' short attention span. The episode has the wit of the best of All in the Family, and benign mother Marge becomes a force for good, in the Edith Bunker tradition." Virginia Mann of The Record called the episode "terrific", though she believed its social and political "overtones" were more likely to appeal to adults than children. Tom Shales of the Washington Post described the episode as "a bull's-eye political satire". Ken Tucker of Entertainment Weekly described the episode as "masterful".

Doug Pratt, a DVD reviewer and Rolling Stone contributor, thought the episode's story was "nicely composed, so you don't have to recognize the Citizen Kane references to appreciate the effort, but it adds to the fun." He also noted that it begins the exploration of Mr. Burns "in earnest, the first of many characters who will receive elaborate coverage as the series advances." Jeremy Kleinman of DVD Talk thought both Lisa's "tremendous intellect" and Marge's "moral compass" were "probed" in the episode, and he thought one "clear highlight" of the episode was Burns's attempts to explain away Blinky's mutation by turning to an actor portraying Charles Darwin who proceeds to give a speech suggesting that Blinky is merely advanced.

DVD Movie Guide's Colin Jacobson wrote: "The episode took an unusual approach for an early show, as it focused largely on a secondary character. One could argue that season one's 'Krusty Gets Busted' did the same, but 'Two Cars in Every Garage and Three Eyes on Every Fish' provided a heavier emphasis on Burns than that prior program did Krusty. This helped make it a fairly good episode. It fleshed out Burns's character a little better and gave us a reasonably entertaining experience. The episode fell short of greatness, but it worked nicely for the most part."
