= Dancin' Homer =

- The Simpsons episode
- Episode no.: Season 2 Episode 5
- Directed by: Mark Kirkland
- Written by: Ken Levine; David Isaacs
- Production code: 7F05
- Original air date: November 8, 1990

Guest appearances
- Tony Bennett as himself; Tom Poston as the Capital City Goofball; Daryl L. Coley as Oscar "Bleeding Gums" Murphy; Ken Levine as Dan Horde

Episode features
- Chalkboard gag: "I will not trade pants with others"
- Couch gag: The family (except for Maggie) sits on the couch; Maggie then peeks her head out of Marge's tall hair.
- Commentary: Matt Groening; David Isaacs; Ken Levine; Mike Reiss; Mark Kirkland

Episode chronology
← Previous "Two Cars in Every Garage and Three Eyes on Every Fish"	Next → "Dead Putting Society"
- The Simpsons season 2

"Dancin' Homer" is the fifth episode of the second season of the American animated television series The Simpsons. It originally aired on Fox in the United States on November 8, 1990. In the episode, Homer becomes the new mascot of the Springfield Isotopes, the town's baseball team, after firing up the crowd at a baseball game. When the Isotopes start a winning streak, Homer becomes the mascot for the Capital City Capitals. The Simpsons move there but return home after Homer fails to enthrall the big-city crowd.

The episode was written by Ken Levine and David Isaacs and directed by Mark Kirkland. It was Kirkland's first directing role, and he has since directed many episodes. Singer Tony Bennett guest starred as himself and actor Tom Poston guest starred as the Capital City Capitals' mascot, the Capital City Goofball. Since airing, the episode has received mostly positive reviews from television critics. It acquired a Nielsen rating of 14.9, and was the highest-rated show on the Fox network the week it aired.

== Plot ==
One night while drinking beer at Moe's Tavern, Homer tells the story of his big break. The Simpsons attend a home game of the Springfield Isotopes, the town's minor league baseball team, as part of an outing sponsored by the Springfield Nuclear Power Plant. Homer fears that his chance to have any fun at the game are ruined when his boss, Mr. Burns sits next to him; to his surprise, though, Mr. Burns buys him several beers and the two men enjoy taunting the Isotopes. When a drunk Homer does an impromptu dance to the tune of "Baby Elephant Walk," the crowd responds with enthusiasm and the Isotopes go on to win the game, breaking the longest losing streak in professional baseball.

Homer is hired as the Isotopes' mascot, spurring the team to a winning streak. Their next loss causes Homer to worry that he will be fired, but he is instead offered a chance to perform during the major-league games played in Capital City by its team, the Capitals. He is to fill in for their mascot, the Capital City Goofball, during portions of each game. The Simpsons pack their belongings, say goodbye to their friends, and move to Capital City. However, Homer's first performance fails to impress the crowd; he is fired immediately afterward, and the family moves back to Springfield.

As Homer finishes his story, he finds Moe and all the customers enthralled and asking to hear it again. He wonders why tales of misfortune are so popular.

== Production ==
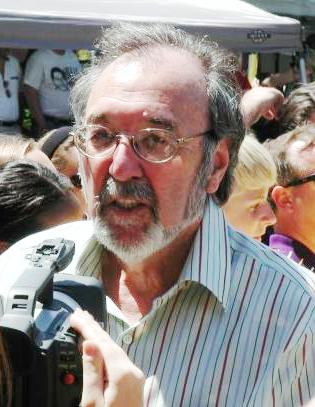
James L. Brooks came up with the idea of the wraparounds.

The episode was written by Ken Levine and David Isaacs, and directed by Mark Kirkland. It was the first episode of The Simpsons Kirkland directed. He has since directed over 50 episodes. Levine, a former minor league baseball announcer, pitched the idea of using that sport as a background, and once he came up with Homer as a dancing mascot, producer Sam Simon was initially resistant given Bart had been the biggest draw of the series, only for the writers to reply they found Homer a more fun character to write. Executive producer James L. Brooks came up with the idea of the Moe's Tavern wraparounds at the beginning and the end of the episode. It was added because the writers did not know how to end the episode.

Along with giving the animators orientation regarding looks and ambience of minor league games, many of the new characters introduced in the episode were named after Levine's friends from his announcer career. The minor league announcer in the episode, whom Levine voiced, was named Dan Hoard after his broadcasting partner in Syracuse, New York. The major league announcer was named Dave Glass after Levine's partner in Norfolk, Virginia, and the Capital City Capitals owner who fires Homer was named Dave Rosenfield after the general manager of the Tidewater Tides. When conceiving the name for Springfield's own team, Levine started to think of connecting it to the nuclear power plant, with Isotopes chosen as "the funniest, goofiest name we could come up with". The episode features a guest appearance by singer Tony Bennett, who was the first guest star to appear as himself on The Simpsons. Bennett appears in a scene in which the Simpson family meets him while taking a tour of Capital City. He also sings a song called "Capital City" over the closing credits. The lyrics and music of the song were written by Simpsons writer Jeff Martin. Tom Poston guest starred in the episode as the Capital City Goofball. The mascot has appeared in many episodes later on in the show, but he has spoken only once since "Dancin' Homer" and has been reduced to making minor background appearances. Ron Taylor was meant to reprise his role of Oscar "Bleeding Gums" Murphy, who he had played in the first-season episode "Moaning Lisa", but was unable to record the part; Daryl L. Coley filled in for him.

"Dancin' Homer" was, together with "Old Money", selected for release in a video collection titled The Best of The Simpsons, which was released May 3, 1994. In 2000, it was included on video collection of selected sports-themed episodes, titled: The Simpsons: On Your Marks, Get Set, D'oh!. Other episodes included in the collection set were "Faith Off", "The Homer They Fall", and "Lisa on Ice". The episode was again included in the 2004 DVD release of the On Your Marks, Get Set, D'oh! set. The episode was also included on The Simpsons season two DVD set, which was released on August 6, 2002. Levine, Isaacs, Kirkland, Mike Reiss, and Matt Groening participated in the DVD's audio commentary.

== Cultural references ==
Although it has been rumored Homer's chants and his nickname "Dancin' Homer" is a reference to American baseball fan Wild Bill Hagy, the writer of the episode Ken Levine has said he did not model the character after Hagy and did not even know of the reference until after the show aired. Hagy earned the nickname "The Roar from Thirty-Four" for his chants during the 1970s in section thirty-four at Baltimore's Memorial Stadium. Homer spells out Springfield just like Hagy spelled O-R-I-O-L-E-S with his arms.

A drunk Homer performs his first dance to the 1961 tune "Baby Elephant Walk" written by Henry Mancini. Oscar "Bleeding Gums" Murphy makes a 26-minute-long performance of the "Star-Spangled Banner" at the game where Homer performs his first dance. Homer's line, "Today, as I leave for Capital City, I consider myself the luckiest mascot on the face of the earth," is a reference to Lou Gehrig's farewell speech in the 1942 baseball film The Pride of the Yankees. The song "Capital City" which Bennett sings over the closing credits is a parody of the 1980 song "New York, New York" by Frank Sinatra. The Capital City Goofball is a parody of the Philly Phanatic as well as the San Diego Chicken. The Capital City ballpark was designed after the Houston Astrodome.

== Reception ==
In its original broadcast, "Dancin' Homer" finished twenty-fifth in the ratings for the week of November 5–11, 1990, with a Nielsen rating of 14.9, equivalent to approximately fourteen million viewing households. It was the highest-rated show on Fox that week.

Since airing, the episode has received mostly positive reviews from television critics. DVD Movie Guide's Colin Jacobson said it was "probably the best episode" of the season, and commented that "Dancin' Homer" offered a "consistently satisfying show. Like the better episodes, it packed a lot of action into its twenty-three minutes, as Homer's saga took on a near epic feeling. It also contained more wonderfully bizarre asides than usual at this point in the series' run. From the Rastafarians who appear in the crowd when Homer performs 'Baby Elephant Walk', to the existence of the Players' Ex-Wives section at the ballpark, the episode provided a fun and rich program."

In a review of the second season, Bryce Wilson of Cinema Blend said "Dancin' Homer" felt "a bit flat", but "even in [its] lowest points, humor is easy to find." Dawn Taylor of The DVD Journal thought the best line of the episode was Homer's "Marge, this ticket doesn't just give me a seat. It also gives me the right — no, the duty — to make a complete ass of myself." Jeremy Kleinman of DVD Talk said lines from the episode such as "A Simpson on a T-shirt, I never thought I'd see the day" show a "humorous self-awareness of the emergence of The Simpsons as cultural phenomenon".

Jerry Greene of the Orlando Sentinel named this episode the third best episode of the show with a sports theme. The Pittsburgh Post-Gazette named it second best sports moment in the history of the show. Gary Russell and Gareth Roberts, the authors of the book I Can't Believe It's a Bigger and Better Updated Unofficial Simpsons Guide, wrote: "Understanding baseball isn't really a requirement for this episode, as the humor doesn't come from the games so much as the personalities. Tony Bennett's cameo is great, and Homer's dance has rightly become legendary."
