= Simpson and Delilah =

- The Simpsons episode
- Episode no.: Season 2 Episode 2
- Directed by: Rich Moore
- Written by: Jon Vitti
- Production code: 7F02
- Original air date: October 18, 1990

Guest appearance
- Harvey Fierstein as Karl

Episode features
- Chalkboard gag: "Tar is not a plaything"
- Couch gag: The family does a little Egyptian dance.
- Commentary: Matt Groening; Jon Vitti; Al Jean; James L. Brooks

Episode chronology
← Previous "Bart Gets an 'F'"	Next → "Treehouse of Horror"
- The Simpsons season 2

"Simpson and Delilah" is the second episode of the second season of the American animated television series The Simpsons. It originally aired on Fox in the United States on October 18, 1990. In the episode, Homer uses the Springfield Nuclear Power Plant's medical insurance plan to buy Dimoxinil (a parody of Minoxidil), a miracle hair growth formula. When Homer's bald head sprouts a full mane of hair, he is promoted at work and hires a gay secretary named Karl. The episode was written by Jon Vitti and directed by Rich Moore, and guest starred Harvey Fierstein as Karl.

== Plot ==
After Homer sees an ad for a hair-restoring miracle drug called Dimoxinil, he uses Springfield Nuclear Power Plant's medical insurance plan to pay for it. After applying the drug, he wakes up the next day with a full head of hair. Mr. Burns scans the security monitors to find someone to promote to the "token" position of junior executive. Mistaking Homer for a young, unspoiled go-getter, Mr. Burns promotes him.

When Homer has trouble finding a secretary who is not a seductive young woman, a man named Karl persuades Homer to hire him. Karl soon proves indispensable to Homer. When he forgets his own wedding anniversary, Karl hires a singing telegram service to serenade Marge with "You Are So Beautiful".

At an executive board meeting, Homer comes up with a way to increase worker productivity. After this, workplace safety improves and accidents decrease. Smithers correctly observes that this is due to Homer no longer being in a position to cause problems, but his notion is mocked and dismissed by Mr. Burns. Homer spends his paycheck on home improvements and presents for the kids. Marge worries that he should save for a rainy day, but Homer dismisses it by telling her that the good times are here to stay.

At work, Homer continues to be in Mr. Burns' good graces and is given a key to the executive washroom. Smithers, angry that his loyal service is forgotten, tries to dig dirt on Homer and discovers his Dimoxinil deal. Smithers attempts to get Homer fired for committing insurance fraud, but Karl takes the blame and is fired instead. Homer is nervous about giving a speech at the plant, and discovers Bart has spilled and ruined the contents of the miracle hair drug. Homer tells his son that he's caused a lot of damage and worst of all that "baldness is hereditary."

The next day, Homer loses all his hair, as he had to keep applying the drug on his head. Before the meeting, Karl appears with a prepared speech for Homer and reassures him that all his accomplishments were due to his will and effort, not his hair. Homer gives his speech, but the audience refuses to take him seriously because he has no hair and walks out on him. Mr. Burns gives Homer his old job back, sympathizing with him having male pattern baldness like Mr. Burns does.

At home that night, Marge insists that Homer's old "dead end" job as a safety inspector has always provided for the family and the kids will get over having less than their friends. When Homer is worried about his baldness making him ugly to Marge, she sings "You Are So Beautiful" to him.

== Production ==
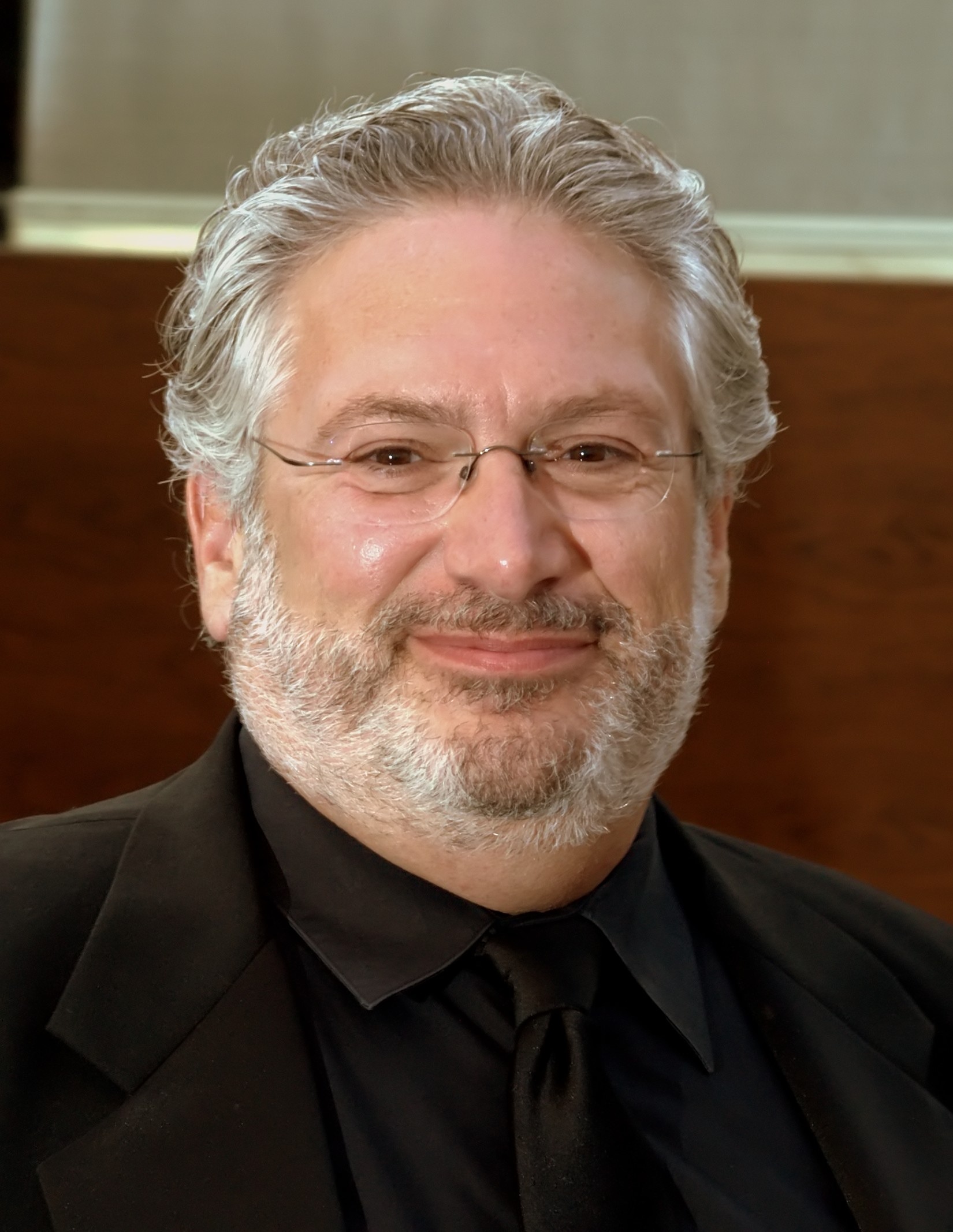
Harvey Fierstein voiced Karl, and gave suggestions on the character's appearance.

Homer's hair product Dimoxinil is a spoof on a similar product, Minoxidil, which fascinated the writers. The production staff tried to give Homer a new hairstyle in each scene after he grows hair, which started with his long hair, then changed into a 1970s small afro, then a close-cropped 1950s haircut, and finally a moussed 1980s hairdo with a small ponytail. Homer's final look was inspired by the television series Miami Vice. The character Karl was played by openly gay actor Harvey Fierstein. Groening had originally intended to design Karl to look like Fierstein, who objected to the idea because he felt he did not "look like gay people, how they're supposed to look." Fierstein suggested that the character be made "blond, and tall, and gorgeous, and skinny, and [given] a beautiful place to live."

In contrast to Albert Brooks, Dustin Hoffman, and Michael Jackson, who did not allow their real names to be used (Brooks later did), Fierstein was one of the very few early guest stars who was not embarrassed or reluctant to be associated with the show and welcomed his name in the credits.

The episode features a kiss between Homer and Karl, which occurred a decade prior to US television's first real man-on-man kiss on Dawson's Creek. In the episode, Karl is implied to be homosexual; creator Matt Groening says that when people began asking "was he gay?" the day after the episode aired, his response was "he's whatever you want him to be." However, Groening points out, "he does kiss Homer: He does give him a nice pat on the butt" which is "beyond [what] any other cartoon" had done at the time.

Karl was originally supposed to return for a cameo appearance in the season 14 episode "Three Gays of the Condo". In the script, Homer was thrown out of the house by Marge, and encountered Karl. The purpose of the appearance was to introduce a gay couple that Homer would live with. Fierstein however felt that "the script was a lot of very clever gay jokes, and there just wasn't that Simpsons twist" and turned the role down.

== Cultural references ==
The episode's title is a play on the biblical story of Samson, an Israelite judge with superhuman strength. All of his power was lost when his long hair was cut, similar to what happens to Homer when he loses his hair again. In the Bible, Delilah is Samson's lover, who betrays him by ordering a servant to cut his hair in his sleep and turns him over to Philistine lords.

Dimoxinil is an obvious play on Minoxidil, which at the time of this episode was much more costly and not available over the counter.

The scene in which Homer is running through town after he got his hair is a reference to the film It's a Wonderful Life. The scene in which Homer receives the key to the executive washroom is a reference to the movie Will Success Spoil Rock Hunter?

When Homer meets Mr. Burns in the executive washroom, Burns shows his admiration for German World War II General Erwin Rommel, saying he watched a documentary on the DuMont Television Network about the 'Desert Fox' the night before. Burns exclaims "now there was a man who could get things done!"

The classical music heard in the executive washroom scene is from French composer Claude Debussy's string quartet in G minor.

== Reception ==
During the second season, The Simpsons aired Thursdays at 8 p.m. on Fox, the same time as The Cosby Show on NBC. The supposed "Bill vs. Bart" rivalry had been heavily hyped by the media. The first airing of "Simpson and Delilah" had a 16.2 rating and 25% share, while The Cosby Show had an 18.5 rating. However, viewer-wise, The Simpsons won with 29.9 million viewers. It is one of the highest-rated episodes of The Simpsons. "Bart Gets an 'F'", the season premiere and episode that aired the week before, averaged an 18.4 Nielsen rating, had 29% of the audience and was watched by an estimated 33.6 million viewers.

This episode was placed twenty-third on Entertainment Weekly's top 25 The Simpsons episodes list. The Daily Telegraph characterized the episode as one of "The 10 Best Simpsons TV Episodes."

Dan Castellaneta, the voice of Homer, named it his favorite episode of the show together with "Lisa's Substitute" and "Homer the Heretic". When The Simpsons began streaming on Disney+ in 2019, former Simpsons writer and executive producer Bill Oakley named this one of the best classic Simpsons episodes to watch on the service.

Harvey Fierstein is number two on TV Guide's "All-time Favorite Guest Voices." Entertainment Weekly named Fierstein's role as Karl as one of the sixteen best guest appearances on The Simpsons. Gary Russell and Gareth Roberts, the authors of the book I Can't Believe It's a Bigger and Better Updated Unofficial Simpsons Guide, praised Fierstein's performance, saying the episode was "brought to life by the superb character of Karl, helped no doubt by Harvey Fierstein's unique vocal drawl."
