= The Caper Chase =

- The Simpsons episode
- Episode no.: Season 28; Episode 19
- Directed by: Lance Kramer
- Written by: Jeff Westbrook
- Production code: WABF12
- Original air date: April 2, 2017

Guest appearances
- Jason Alexander as Verlander; Ken Jennings as himself; Stan Lee as himself; Robert McKee as himself; Suze Orman as herself; Neil deGrasse Tyson as himself

Episode features
- Couch gag: The Simpson family arrives as X-Men characters (Homer is Professor X, Marge is Krusty who then transforms into Mystique, Lisa is Storm, Maggie is Wolverine, and Bart is Angel). Then Stan Lee appears and says "There is nothing too short I can't cameo."
- Commentary: Matt Groening: Al Jean; Tom Gammill; Ken Jennings; David Silverman; Stan Lee

Episode chronology
← Previous "A Father's Watch"	Next → "Looking for Mr. Goodbart"
- The Simpsons season 28

"The Caper Chase" is the nineteenth episode of the twenty-eighth season of the American animated television series The Simpsons, and the 615th episode of the series overall. The episode was directed by Lance Kramer and written by Jeff Westbrook. It aired in the United States on Fox on April 2, 2017 and in the United Kingdom on Sky 1 on May 7, 2017.

In this episode, Mr. Burns creates his own university with the power plant works as teachers. Jason Alexander guest starred as Verlander. Astrophysicist Neil deGrasse Tyson, Jeopardy! champion Ken Jennings, financial advisor Suze Orman, and author Robert McKee appeared as themselves. The episode received mixed reviews.

== Plot ==
A softball match is being played to little athletic achievement between teams from the Indian Point and Springfield Nuclear Plant. After Homer collapses on the field, Mr. Burns and the other coach talk about how the market for nuclear energy will be lucrative forever.

Burns goes to his alma mater, Yale University, to endow a chair in nuclear plant management, only to learn that the entire student body is now made of "highly entitled wusses" from the Whiffenpoofs on down, and who follow left-wing views that appall Burns. He then finds out that running a university can earn him a lot of money from a member of the Skull and Bones society named Bourbon Verlander. Burns then cuts a deal with Bourbon and withdraws all of his financial support to Yale in order to set up his own for-profit university, hiring the power plant workers including Homer, Lenny and Carl as the teachers.

Homer is not doing well with his students and Lisa, who is horrified that Homer became a professor mainly because he did not take the responsibility of educating people seriously, gives him a DVD box set of inspirational teachers movies. After watching them, he gets better at teaching and Burns sells Homer to Bourbon.

Homer meets Neil deGrasse Tyson, Ken Jennings, Suze Orman, and Robert McKee, and sees them being introduced to a group of young female "students" who are actually life-like humanoid robots that will all get into Yale and earn "financial aid" that gets funneled directly to Bourbon. Six months later, Homer ruins Bourbon's integration of the robots at Yale University with a microaggression that makes them all explode. While despondent that his wealth is gone, he flaunts his health until a robot head hits him and apparently kills him.

In the final scene, the teachers then start teaching Lisa, Marge, and Bart at the Simpson residence with Neil showing Lisa the galaxy, Ken helping Bart with his homework (to Bart's chagrin), and Suze attempting to convince Marge to kill Homer in order to get a huge settlement with Robert coming and saying that end credits are bad and "story over, goodnight!"

== Production ==
In August 2016, Entertainment Weekly reported that Jason Alexander would guest star as Bourbon Verlander, a Yale graduate who owns for-profit colleges. Astrophysicist Neil deGrasse Tyson, Jeopardy! champion Ken Jennings, financial advisor Suze Orman, and author Robert McKee guest starred as themselves. Comic book writer Stan Lee appeared as himself in the couch gag.

== Cultural references ==
Verlander's and Burns' for-profit colleges are parodies of Trump University. Verlander's retreat is a parody of the one in the 2014 film Ex Machina.

== Reception ==
=== Critical response ===
Dennis Perkins of The A.V. Club gave the episode a C+, stating "But 'The Caper Chase' is just all over the place, with Burns' return to Yale spurring him to open a for-profit, Trump-style university like those of fellow nuclear plant maven Bourbon Verlander (guest voice Jason Alexander). That plot seems prepared to morph into an inspirational tale of Homer becoming a Dead Poets Society-esque teacher (skinflint Burns staffs the school with plant workers), until Verlander swoops in to whisk Homer away to his super-secret Ex Machina-styled retreat, where he's got a scheme going involving an army of Ava-looking robot students working to get government loans. Book in some time for a handful of guest-teacher guest stars (Neil deGrasse Tyson, Suze Orman, Jeopardy champ Ken Jennings, and screenplay guru Robert McKee as themselves), and a very rushed wrap-up where Homer has to short-circuit all the Yale-enrolled robot students before they can make Verlander all that sweet, sweet student aid, and you've got a frenetic episode that can't decide what it wants to be."

Tony Sokol of Den of Geek gave the episode 4.5/5 stars, stating "Release me, you hound. I love Mr. Burns, unabashedly and bashedly. I can see what Smithers sees in him. All that power in a man so fragile he floats away on cigar smoke and so old his living will is a sword of Damocles hanging over a trap door that leads to a mote of nuclear waste. Every single line, except the 'what what what' bit, is a joy tonight. We’ve come to our understanding of Burns through segmented antics at the expense of all who don’t like to pay. He is the embodiment of corporate corruption and political shenanigans. He could be his own Koch brother."

=== Viewing figures ===
"The Caper Chase" scored a 0.9 rating with a 3 share and was watched by 2.13 million people, making it Fox's highest-rated show of the night.

=== Themes and analysis ===
Islam Issa cited a scene in this episode as a commentary of people who react to the works of Shakespeare without reading it, stating:

The Simpsons satirised the lack of nuance and inexperience of "social justice warriors" and how the figure and works of Shakespeare can easily find their way into social justice conversations when the show portrays Yale University students holding up a "SHAKESPEARE IS MURDER" banner to the dismay of wealthy conservative Mr. Burns...
