= Kamp Krustier =

- The Simpsons episode
- Episode no.: Season 28; Episode 16
- Directed by: Rob Oliver
- Written by: David M. Stern
- Production code: WABF09
- Original air date: March 5, 2017

Guest appearances
- Lizzy Caplan as Virginia Johnson; Michael Sheen as William Masters

Episode features
- Chalkboard gag: "We're the only house where the Christmas tree is still up"
- Couch gag: A Pachinko machine is shown, with the family at the bottom. Everyone but Homer gets many balls in. Homer is sad but on opening his mouth he swallows one and chokes.

Episode chronology
← Previous "The Cad and the Hat" "Kamp Krusty"	Next → "22 for 30"
- The Simpsons season 28

"Kamp Krustier" is the sixteenth episode of the twenty-eighth season of the American animated television series The Simpsons, and the 613th episode of the series overall. It aired in the United States on the Fox Network on March 5, 2017. A direct follow-up to the season 4 episode "Kamp Krusty", it was directed by Rob Oliver and features a script by David M. Stern, who had not written for the show in over 18 years.

In the episode, Bart and Lisa return from Kamp Krusty traumatized and Homer becomes a more productive worker. It contains guest appearances from Lizzy Caplan and Michael Sheen, both reprising their roles from Masters of Sex for the episode. "Kamp Krustier" received generally mixed reviews from critics.

== Plot ==
The story is set right after the events of "Kamp Krusty". Santa's Little Helper follows the trail of Homer and Marge's clothes, leading him to Bart's treehouse, where they were having sex. Chief Wiggum and Officer Lou arrive at the scene, having been called by Ned. Homer tells them the kids are fine, before showing them a postcard from Kamp Krusty. The scene switches to the camp, where everything is getting ruined by Bart and the other bullies.

The traumatized kids return on a bus, guided by Krusty. The kids are taken to therapy and the therapist says to Marge to keep an eye on Bart. Back at home, Bart fakes PTSD and interrupts Homer and Marge's sexual activity. The next day, Bart stays at home watching TV. With Bart on their bed and being unable to have fun with Marge, Homer goes to work early and finds out what happens when the Power Plant is empty. Bart has a nightmare of the camp when they went on the canoe and asks Lisa for help. Homer gets more productive than ever and gets a raise by Mr. Burns while Bart and Lisa go to the amusement park where they cut the line thanks to the trauma they suffered from.

Homer refuses to have sex with Marge and she thinks they need the help of a therapist too who suggests taking the kids back to Kamp Krusty, which was transformed into an adult retreat called Klub Krusty. Bart and Lisa find a cabin they have visited after escaping with the canoe and remember another kid with them named Charlie who fell in the rapids and never came back up. Marge and Homer have some fun at the club while Bart and Lisa report Charlie missing to the club security which reveals he's alive, and also that Charlie is not a kid but a little person. During the credits, shots of Homer Simpson clones are shown at work as a Barry White-like singer is heard singing in the background about not wanting to be intimate with the object of the song.

== Production ==
"Kamp Krustier" is a direct sequel to the fourth season episode "Kamp Krusty" and the series' first direct sequel of a previous episode. Both "Kamp Krusty" and this episode were written by David M. Stern, who had not written for the show since 1999.

Michael Sheen and Lizzy Caplan were cast as William Masters and Virginia Johnson, respectively, reprising their roles from the television series Masters of Sex. Executive producer Al Jean stated that they would tell Homer and Marge to blame their kids for ruining their sex life. Regarding her recording experience, Caplan said she was able to see the production offices and memorabilia and that she received a gift bag.

== Cultural references ==
When Homer and Marge are about to have sex, his brain plays Adagio for Strings by Samuel Barber followed by Boléro by Maurice Ravel. The episode's opening pokes fun at president Donald Trump, with his "new ride", Air Force One, also depicting Vladimir Putin with a Pegasus.

== Reception ==
"Kamp Krustier" was watched by 2.56 million people and scored a 1.1 rating with a 4 share, making it Fox's highest rated show of the night. The episode's ratings were slightly higher than the previous, "The Cad and the Hat", which was watched by 2.44 million viewers, and, like "Kamp Krustier", scored a 1.1 rating with a 4 share. Its ratings compared to the episode's prequel, Kamp Krusty, were significantly lower. On its original airdate over twenty years preceding this episode, "Kamp Krusty” finished 24th in ratings for the week of September 21–27, 1992, with a Nielsen rating of 13.5, equivalent to approximately 12.6 million viewing households. It was the highest-rated show on the Fox network that week. The ratings for "Kamp Krustier" were an almost 79% decrease from the ratings of "Kamp Krusty".

"The Simpsons‘ season 28 episode 16, “Kamp Krustier,” is a flashback episode that’s heavy on couples’ therapy and repression, but don’t let that fool you, it’s still a foolhardy enterprise."

— Tony Sokol, in his review of "Kamp Krustier" for Den of Geek.

Dennis Perkins of The A.V. Club gave the episode a C− stating, "Well, no one can accuse The Simpsons of trampling all over one of its all-time best episodes. Actually, wait—I can, as the 24-seasons-removed 'Kamp Krustier' finds a way to revisit the classic Simpsons episode 'Kamp Krusty' without expanding on it, deconstructing it, or even making a memorable travesty of it. That long-absent original 'Kamp Krusty' writer David M. Stern returned to the show as main credited writer for the first time in some 18 years and produced something so innocuously unmemorable is a genuine disappointment."

Tony Sokol of Den of Geek gave the episode four out of five stars, praising some of the episode's humor, but criticizing its "lackluster" closing song.

Emily St. James of Vox stated that the episode was "funny and fresh without feeling like it’s coasting off the show’s glory days."
