= Kamp Krusty =

- The Simpsons episode
- Episode no.: Season 4 Episode 1
- Directed by: Mark Kirkland
- Written by: David M. Stern
- Production code: 8F24
- Original air date: September 24, 1992

Episode features
- Chalkboard gag: "This punishment is not boring and pointless"
- Couch gag: The family finds Fred Flintstone, Wilma, and Pebbles already sitting on the couch.
- Commentary: Matt Groening; Al Jean; Mark Kirkland; David Silverman

Episode chronology
← Previous "Brother, Can You Spare Two Dimes?"	Next → "A Streetcar Named Marge" "Kamp Krustier"
- The Simpsons season 4

"Kamp Krusty" is the fourth season premiere of the American animated television series The Simpsons. The 60th episode overall, it originally aired on the Fox Network in the United States on September 24, 1992. It was written by David M. Stern, and directed by Mark Kirkland.

In the episode, the children of Springfield attend Kamp Krusty, a summer camp named after Krusty the Clown. The camp is extremely unpleasant, leading to the campers rebelling against the camp director. Meanwhile, with the kids away, Homer and Marge enjoy more time together, and Homer becomes physically and emotionally healthier.

Both the writers and animators were excited to work on the episode, with the latter having experience with summer camps, and wanted to work to portray them correctly. Although it never came to fruition, it was suggested that the plot for "Kamp Krusty" could be an outline for a possible The Simpsons film, but the episode itself barely fit its own runtime minimum. Retrospectively, the episode received generally positive reviews from critics. A direct sequel episode, "Kamp Krustier", aired as part of the series' twenty-eighth season, on March 5, 2017.

== Plot ==
Bart and Lisa attend the summer camp Kamp Krusty, leaving Homer and Marge to have some time alone for the summer. The camp's director, Mr. Black, has licensed the camp's name from Krusty the Clown. However, the camp turns out to be a dystopia; as Lisa explains in a letter to her parents, "Our nature hikes have become grim death marches. Our arts and crafts center is, in actuality, a Dickensian workhouse." The camp counselors are bullies Dolph, Jimbo and Kearney, who feed the campers Krusty-Brand Imitation Gruel while enjoying deluxe accommodations themselves; the bullies sip brandy with Mr. Black, who intones: "Gentlemen, to evil!" Worst of all, Krusty himself is unaware of the camp's conditions and is currently on a vacation in London.

To appease the restless campers, Mr. Black tells the children that Krusty himself is coming to visit. However, "Krusty" turns out to be a poorly disguised Barney Gumble, and the ruse does not fool Bart. Bart then leads the campers in revolt, driving out Mr. Black and the bullies and changing the camp's name to Camp Bart. Meanwhile, Homer and Marge see a breaking news report of the campers' revolt. After learning that Bart is the leader of the rebellion, Homer instantly loses the hair he grew and regains the weight he lost since the children went to camp.

After the real Krusty is informed of Kamp Krusty's conditions, he returns from London to visit the camp. He apologizes to the campers for their ordeal and his ignorance of their plight; Mr. Black had bribed Krusty with a "dump truck full of money" in order to gain full control of the camp. To make it up to the campers, Krusty takes them for "two weeks at the happiest place on Earth: Tijuana!". As "South of the Border" (sung by Gene Merlino) plays, a montage is shown of Krusty and the campers vacationing in Tijuana, but Krusty misses the bus home at the end of the trip.

== Production ==
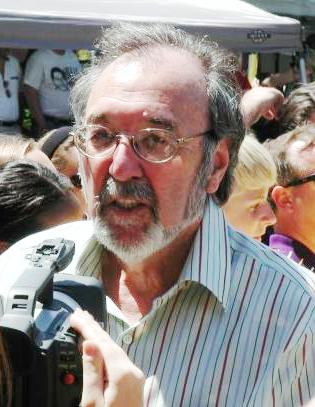
James L. Brooks originally wanted the episode to become a film.

The idea that the children should go to a camp run by Krusty the Clown was first suggested by David M. Stern. The animators were enthusiastic about making this episode because they had all gone to summer camps as children and thought it would be a fun episode to write for. The writers also thought that "it would be fun if while the kids are gone Homer and Marge find that as the kids are miserable their marriage is better than ever". The layout for Bart and Lisa's cabin was influenced by the director, Mark Kirkland, who as a child went to a Boy Scout camp that had exposed wires and other similar faults. Kirkland was also sure that the character Mr. Black would reappear later in the series, but he never did. Al Jean commented, "I guess that the hydrofoil really got Mr. Black out of the show forever".

After he saw the completed episode, James L. Brooks called the writers and suggested that the "Kamp Krusty" script be used as a plotline for a film. However, the episode ran very short, and to make it barely fit the minimum time, the Kamp Krusty song had to be lengthened by a number of verses. The episode was also chosen to be the season premiere of the fourth season of The Simpsons, further complicating matters. As Jean told Brooks, "First of all, if we make it into the movie then we don't have a premiere, and second, if we can't make 18 minutes out of this episode how are we supposed to make 80?"

Along with the following episode, "A Streetcar Named Marge", "Kamp Krusty" was a holdover from the previous season's production run. It was the final episode to be produced in this run and so the last animated at Klasky Csupo, before the show's producers Gracie Films moved its domestic production to Film Roman.

== Cultural references ==
Bart's dream sequence at the beginning of the episode ends with the students destroying Springfield Elementary School to Alice Cooper's "School's Out". The idea for the song sung by the children was from a 1960s TV show called Camp Runamuck, which has a theme song similar in structure to the Kamp Krusty song. The scene where Lisa gives a bottle of whiskey to a man on horseback as payment for delivering a letter is a reference to a similar scene with Meryl Streep in the film The French Lieutenant's Woman.

Some aspects of "Kamp Krusty" are references to the novel Lord of the Flies, such as a pig's head being placed on the end of a spear, kids wielding primitive weapons and wearing war paint, and a burning effigy. The scene where Kearney beats a drum to make the campers work in the sweatshop is taken from the slave galley scene in the film Ben-Hur. The episode ends with the song "South of the Border". According to the DVD commentary, the version used in the credits was not sung by Frank Sinatra, but by another artist impersonating him.

== Reception and legacy ==
In its original broadcast, "Kamp Krusty" finished 24th in ratings for the week of September 21–27, 1992, with a Nielsen rating of 13.5, equivalent to approximately 12.6 million viewing households. It was the highest-rated show on the Fox network that week.

Nathan Rabin of The A.V. Club gave the episode an A, ultimately saying the episode began the Simpsons' fourth season in an amazing way. Gary Russell and Gareth Roberts, the authors of the book I Can't Believe It's a Bigger and Better Updated Unofficial Simpsons Guide, had mixed views about the episode. They said that it is "A bit baffling to non-Americans unfamiliar with the summer camp system. But top grade stuff nonetheless. Anyone who's worked as a counsellor in such a place can testify to this episode's authenticity." The episode's reference to Ben-Hur was named the 31st greatest film reference in the history of the show by Total Film's Nathan Ditum.

A direct sequel episode, "Kamp Krustier", aired as part of the series' twenty-eighth season, on March 5, 2017. This was the series' first direct sequel of a previous episode. Like "Kamp Krusty", "Kamp Krustier" was written by David M. Stern, who had not written for the show since 1999.

== See also ==
- "Kamp Krustier"
