= Treehouse of Horror XXVII =

- The Simpsons episode
- Promotional poster
- Episode no.: Season 28; Episode 4
- Directed by: Steven Dean Moore
- Written by: Joel H. Cohen
- Production code: VABF16
- Original air date: October 16, 2016

Guest appearances
- Drew Carey as himself; Donald Fagen as himself; Kelsey Grammer as Sideshow Bob; Maurice LaMarche as Hedonismbot (VR Couch Gag only); Judith Owen as "600" Singer; Sarah Silverman as Rachel

Episode features
- Couch gag: A parody of Planet of the Apes.

Episode chronology
← Previous "The Town"	Next → "Trust but Clarify"
- The Simpsons season 28

"Treehouse of Horror XXVII" is the fourth episode of the twenty-eighth season of the American animated television series The Simpsons, the 27th episode in the Treehouse of Horror series of Halloween specials, and the 600th episode of the series overall. The episode was directed by Steven Dean Moore and written by Joel H. Cohen. It aired in the United States on Fox on October 16, 2016.

In this episode, the children fight to spend time at a reservoir, Lisa's imaginary friend kills her real friends, and Bart joins a group of secret agents. Judith Owen and Sarah Silverman guest starred. Comedian Drew Carey and musician Donald Fagen appeared as themselves. The episode received mixed reviews.

== Plot ==
The episode opens with the Simpsons in their Halloween costumes with Homer dressed as Bender, Maggie as Charlie Chaplin, Lisa as a recycle-bin and Bart as a pterodactyl visiting a Christmas tree lot early on Halloween, only to be locked in and ambushed by Sideshow Bob, the leprechaun from Treehouse of Horror XII, the ghost of Frank Grimes, and Kang. The living members of the revenge group are killed by Maggie Simpson (in a parody of Alex DeLarge) while Frank Grimes' ghost is livid. The blood from the members spells the title of the episode. Scenes from every preceding episode are displayed as Frank Grimes' ghost notes that Hell runs a non-stop 600 episode marathon of The Simpsons. The couch gag is a parody of Planet of the Apes (viewable with Google Cardboard for special content), showing the Simpson family captive on a planet populated by living couches, before being rescued by their generic brown couch, which they knock unconscious and proceed to sit on.

=== Dry Hard ===
In a four-part parody of The Hunger Games and Mad Max: Fury Road, Mr. Burns controls the last of the water supply in a severely drought-stricken Springfield. He announces that the children will battle each other to the death in a dome with the survivor allowed to spend a day swimming in his personal reservoir. Lisa Simpson is the selected child from the Nevergreen Terrace neighborhood with Homish as her coach. She eventually convinces the population of Springfield to turn against Mr. Burns. The group immediately regret destroying the reservoir as the water is completely wasted. The people of the town think they are saved when a rain storm starts, but the storm results in a flood and later an ice age.

=== BFF R.I.P. ===
Lisa is playing hide and seek with Janey when the latter is killed by a lawn mower. At Janey's funeral, Sherri and Terri decide to let Lisa be their friend and are immediately crushed by a falling tombstone. After Lisa's therapist is also killed under mysterious circumstances, Chief Wiggum suspects her to be the murderer. Lisa realizes her imaginary friend "Rachel" (voiced by Sarah Silverman) has returned and is killing anyone close to her so she can be Lisa's only friend. The next day on the school bus, Milhouse Van Houten is asphyxiated by Rachel, and Lisa is arrested for the murder. In jail, Lisa mentions that her mother was right about Rachel, which convinces her to kill Marge Simpson and everyone Lisa cares about. Lisa escapes jail with Bart's help and confronts Rachel before she can kill Marge. Homer can see Rachel because he is drunk, and his imaginary friend Sergeant Sausage attempts to defeat Rachel but is killed in the microwave. Lisa manages to drive off Rachel by threatening to use her imagination to turn her into a middle-aged woman married to a dentist. Terrified, Rachel fades away. The final scene has Homer eating the remains of "Sergeant Sausage", who reappears and states that imaginary friends cannot die.

=== MoeFinger ===
In a parody of Goldfinger and Kingsman: The Secret Service, Bart is saved from Jimbo, Dolph, and Kearney by Moe Szyslak, who reveals that he and his regular barflies are actually secret agents and asks Bart to take the place of Homer, who is assumed to have died in action. They later receive intel that all the world's beer has been bought by Remoh Industries, a multibillion-dollar company that is hosting a free Steely Dan concert at Duff Stadium. The group sneak into the stadium and learn that Remoh's CEO is Homer, who had bought the beer to celebrate when the lava machine he built makes all the world surrender to him. The agents attack Homer but are killed by a horde of mind-controlled groupies. Bart survives and kills his father, excited to receive a semester of automatic A's in school.

As the song "600" is performed by Judith Owen, the viewers are shown the names of Fox's cancelled shows like Drexell's Class, Babes, Herman's Head, Woops!, Too Something, House of Buggin', Sit Down, Shut Up, Celebrity Boxing, The Littlest Groom, Man vs. Beast, Allen Gregory, The Critic, Futurama, and the at-the-time upcoming project, The Orville.

== Production ==
In July 2016 at San Diego Comic-Con, it was announced that Sarah Silverman, Drew Carey, and Kelsey Grammer as Sideshow Bob would appear in this episode. Silverman had appeared on the show previously as different characters. In this episode, Silverman played Lisa's imaginary friend. Donald Fagen of the band Steely Dan appeared as himself.

In addition to the normal couch gag shown in the episode, an extended couch gag was made available through Google Cardboard. Google approached the producers about making a virtual reality couch gag, and they chose one they had in reserve in case an episode ran short. The extended gag features Kang and Kodos and a character from Futurama. Viewers could access the virtual reality couch gag via a URL that is shown during the normal couch gag.

In honor of the 600th episode, the ending features Judith Owen, wife of Harry Shearer, singing a parody of the song "Goldfinger" while showing a selected list of television shows that Fox has canceled while The Simpsons has been on the air.

== Reception ==
=== Viewing figures ===
"Treehouse of Horror XXVII" scored a 3.0 rating with a 10 share and was watched by 7.44 million people, making The Simpsons Fox's highest rated show of the night.

=== Critical response ===
The episode received mixed reviews.

Dennis Perkins of The A.V. Club gave it a B− stating, "While the annual 'Treehouse of Horror' episodes traditionally get decent ratings, and have produced some classic scenes over the decades, the expectations are lower regarding character development, plot, or general coherence. The Simpsons' Halloween tradition is for quick-hit horror and sci-fi parodies, a heap of references, some gratuitous bloodshed, and the occasional actual smidgen of heart. Grading on that curve, the 27th installment does its job, for the most part."

However, Jesse Schedeen of IGN gave it a score of 5.8 out of 10, saying, "Last year's 'Halloween of Horror' proved that The Simpsons can still deliver great Halloween-themed fare. Unfortunately, the latest 'Treehouse of Horror' installment is far from great. Only one of the three segments is particularly memorable, and even that feels constrained by the seven-minute structure. The time has come for this long-running series to become more experimental with its Halloween episodes."

=== Awards and nominations ===
The extended virtual reality couch gag was nominated for a Primetime Emmy Award for Outstanding Creative Achievement In Interactive Media Within A Scripted Program at the 69th Primetime Creative Arts Emmy Awards.
