= Monty Burns' Fleeing Circus =

- The Simpsons episode
- Episode no.: Season 28; Episode 1
- Directed by: Matthew Nastuk
- Written by: Tom Gammill and Max Pross
- Production code: VABF20
- Original air date: September 25, 2016

Guest appearances
- Amy Schumer as Mrs. Burns; Pendleton Ward as "Simpsons Time" singer

Episode features
- Chalkboard gag: "This arm needs Tommy John surgery"
- Couch gag: The introductory sequence of Adventure Time, called "Simpsons Time", recreated with characters from The Simpsons.

Episode chronology
← Previous "Orange Is the New Yellow"	Next → "Friends and Family"
- The Simpsons season 28

"Monty Burns' Fleeing Circus" is the twenty-eighth season premiere of the American animated television series The Simpsons, and the 597th episode of the series overall. The episode was directed by Matthew Nastuk and written by Tom Gammill and Max Pross. It aired in the United States on Fox on September 25, 2016. It's named as a parody of Monty Python's Flying Circus.

In this episode, Mr. Burns puts on a variety show with Lisa as his assistant but is disturbed by his experiences as a child. Amy Schumer and Pendleton Ward guest starred. The episode received mixed reviews.

This episode included references to golfer Arnold Palmer and his eponymous drink; it aired on the same day as Palmer's death at the age of 87.

== Plot ==
The Simpsons go on a walk through Springfield when they see a group of people looking at the sky in terror as the Lard Lad statue has disappeared. With the police unable to do anything, the town's residents are split between rioting and not rioting, which makes the total damage from the riot $0. Soon, the Lard Lad company decides to rebrand themselves with a new chrome statue. However, the statue immediately has a major issue, as it starts reflecting sun rays into the town, burning it down almost completely. Mayor Quimby promises to rebuild the city, but with the lack of progress six months later, the Simpsons beg Mr. Burns to fund the town's reconstruction. He agrees with the condition that he can put a variety show on the Springfield Bowl.

During the auditions, Burns has flashbacks to when he was a child, about to go on stage for the Pee-wee Pageant of 1913 with his mother wishing him good luck. Later that day, he goes to Springfield Elementary School looking for performers for the show when he has problems opening a clasp on a clipboard. Lisa helps him and Burns decides to hire her as his personal assistant. Back at the auditions, Burns has more flashbacks to his childhood presentation, showing that he was the laughingstock for everyone at the bowl and even his mother failed to comfort him. After Lisa unintentionally upsets Burns, who flashes back to the traumatic event, he decides to cancel the show. Feeling bad for Burns, Lisa gets curious about what happened to him, so Smithers shows her an old recording of his presentation, showing that his suspenders snapped in the middle of his tap-dance presentation, making his pants fall. As he went to put them back, his underwear also fell, resulting in everyone laughing at him. Later, Lisa manages to convince Burns to make the show.

Meanwhile, at the Springfield Nuclear Power Plant with Burns gone, the employees start treating the plant as a resort complete with a pool and games. When Homer prepares for a prank, Marge reminds him that he is the safety inspector for the plant and he is the one who should be stopping that. Later, Homer manages to put the employees back to work, but some bags of popcorn that were inside the core cause a fire.

At the Springfield Bowl, everything goes according to plan, but at the ending they are interrupted by what looks to be fireworks, which is later revealed to be the power plant exploding. However, Burns is not finished, as he wants to reenact his presentation, but his second try does not go any better, as he gets pushed away by a spotlight into a lamp, which causes his pants to burn down, making him the laughingstock at the bowl once again. Burns gets mad at Lisa, but he ends up forgiving her and letting her play the saxophone on stage for an empty crowd, having finally gotten closure from his childhood incident.

Lisa asks Homer why Simpsons always fail and he answers that it is because of a curse as their ancestors did not let Joseph and Mary stay at their home for Jesus' birth. Lisa disputes the validity of Homer's story.

In the final scene, the Lard Lad statue is being melted in the Springfield Tire Fire and engulfs Ralph Wiggum in it.

== Production ==
The couch gag for this episode parodies the intro to the animated series Adventure Time, recreating its opening sequence with Simpsons characters in place of the show's usual cast, such as Bart Simpson as Finn the Human and Homer Simpson as Jake the Dog. The lyrics to the Adventure Time theme were rewritten accordingly, with its series creator Pendleton Ward, who sings the original lyrics, also performing the parody version.

In August 2016, Fox Television Group chairman and CEO Dana Walden announced that Amy Schumer would appear on the season premieres of The Simpsons, Family Guy, and Bob's Burgers as three different characters on the same night. Executive producer Al Jean said that the producers of the three shows wanted to do episodes with musical themes and wanted to have a funny woman to guest star in the episodes. Schumer would have a small role on the Simpsons episode because her casting was late in the production process. Schumer recorded her roles on the three shows at the same time over the telephone. For the Simpsons episode, Schumer played Mr. Burns' mother in flashbacks.

== Cultural references ==
During the variety show, Sherri and Terri perform a water cabinet trick, with one twin apparently floating drowned and dead while her sister takes a bow, in a visual reference to the 2006 science-fiction thriller film The Prestige.

== Reception ==
=== Critical response ===
"Monty Burns' Fleeing Circus" received mixed reviews from television critics.

Dennis Perkins of The A.V. Club gave the episode a C commenting, "There’s room for audaciousness, even cruelty, in The Simpsons’ comedy, if it's earned. ‘Monty Burns’ Fleeing Circus’ wears its breezy brutality and laziness like a sign reading ‘It’s just a cartoon.’ But at its best, The Simpsons is a much better cartoon than this."

Jesse Schedeen of IGN was also very critical of the episode giving it a 4.8/10 calling it "Bad", when elaborated he wrote "The Simpsons' 27th season reminded us that the show can still entertain and even find moments of greatness this far removed from its golden age. However, that was only after kicking off the season with a particularly weak and unsatisfying premiere. Maybe it's going to become an annual tradition to start off poorly and work up from there? At this point I'm hoping that'll be the case. ‘Monty Burns' Fleeing Circus’ wasn't as offensively bad at last year's ‘Every Man's Dream,’ but it did feature this long-running animated sitcom as its most bland and uninspired."

However, Tony Sokol of Den of Geek gave the episode four out of five stars stating "This is the reason I stuck up for Harry Shearer when he was in contract negotiations. Leave it to Mr. Burns to bring life back into The Simpsons after 28 seasons. The old, old man has more life in him than Satan itself. So it makes perfect sense that the lowly residents of Evergreen Terrace make a contract with him to rebuild the town after the devastating unveiling of the new Lard Lad billboard. And breathe new life he does. This season’s opener seems fresh. Maybe as fresh as season 20, but who’s counting? From the very opening, which puts an Adventure Time spin on Springfield...'Monty Burns Fleeing Circus' is a full variety show, the likes of hasn’t been seen since about aught nine. Or at least the Pee Wee Pageant of 1913. The voice acting is superb. I especially like how the entire Simpson family reassures Burnsy that his trap door system was indeed unexpected and, really quite frightening."

=== Ratings ===
"Monty Burns Fleeing Circus" scored a 1.4 rating with a 5 share and was watched by 3.36 million people making The Simpsons Fox's highest rated show of the night.
