= Looking for Mr. Goodbart =

- The Simpsons episode
- Episode no.: Season 28; Episode 20
- Directed by: Mike Frank Polcino
- Written by: Carolyn Omine
- Production code: WABF13
- Original air date: April 30, 2017

Guest appearances
- Valerie Harper as Ma-Ma; Jennifer Saunders as Phoebe Pratt

Episode features
- Chalkboard gag: Grampa writes "I just wrote one and I'm already tired" during the episode.
- Couch gag: The beginning of the episode shows Maggie's scene from the Simpsons short "Good Night". Then, in a parody of The Big Bang Theory opening sequence, a song plays to the tune of that show's theme as the camera zooms through the universe. The view approaches Earth, providing a brief history of The Simpsons from the beginning to present day, accompanied by brief screenshots of older Simpsons moments. We then see the Simpsons run to the couch and sit on it, which then disappears out from under them.

Episode chronology
← Previous "The Caper Chase"	Next → "Moho House"
- The Simpsons season 28

"Looking for Mr. Goodbart" is the twentieth episode of the twenty-eighth season of the American animated television series The Simpsons, and the 616th episode of the series overall. The episode was directed by Mike Frank Polcino and written by Carolyn Omine. It aired in the United States on Fox on April 30, 2017, and the United Kingdom on Sky 1 on May 14, 2017.

In the episode, Bart accompanies elderly women in exchange for gifts, and befriends one woman who he realizes is suicidal. Meanwhile, Homer becomes addicted to the augmented reality game Peekimon Get (a parody of Pokémon Go).

The episode was watched by 2 million viewers, making it the second-most viewed show on Fox that night. For her performance as Bart, Nancy Cartwright was nominated for the Primetime Emmy Award for Outstanding Voice-Over Performance.

== Plot ==
The episode begins in medias res, in which Bart Simpson appears to be mannerly. Bart breaks the fourth wall by offering to tell the show's audience why he has changed.

Two months earlier at Grandparents' Day, Bart changes the lyrics of a song for the grandparents visiting, and Principal Skinner takes him to detention, and also punishes Grampa for trying to intervene. As Skinner is thinking of a punishment for Bart, his mother Agnes Skinner walks in and asks him to take her to the bus stop. Skinner sends Bart, who gets on the bus with her to the candy store. After learning that he can be given gifts for accompanying elderly women, he spends time with many others. One, Phoebe, catches on to what he is doing, but settles to give him money if he can pick her up four days in a row from her nursing home. Meanwhile, Homer becomes addicted to the augmented reality game Peekimon Get (a parody of Pokémon Go). He causes accidents and embarrassment while playing, but Lisa believes that the game is helping him exercise, so she encourages him to play and accompanies him. When he discovers that he can buy in-game content with real money, Lisa begrudgingly agrees to it and Homer spends $600 of the family's savings.

Bart arrives at the nursing home and takes Phoebe out in the woods to admire the nature together. After four days, she gives him the promised money, but he refuses it. Having acknowledged that he changed, Phoebe gives him her camera, saying that she has "bequeathed" it to him. After learning the meaning of the word, Bart realizes that Phoebe had been mentioning plans to commit suicide. Bart turns to Homer and Lisa, who enlist other Peekimon Get players for help finding Phoebe in the woods. They find her alive and she thanks Bart for showing that she still has a lot to live for.

Bart finishes his narration, having learned that it is wrong to play with women's hearts and take advantage of the elderly. At the retirement home, he tells his story to Grampa and apologizes to him for embarrassing him, though Grampa complains about how long the story has been. Marge discovers that Homer had spent their money, but once he assures her that the game will soon fade away, learns to be content with it. During the end credits, Homer and Lisa sing a parody of the original Pokémon anime theme tune.

== Production ==
In July 2016 at San Diego Comic-Con, executive producer Al Jean revealed that an episode parodying Pokémon Go was being produced that would air late this season. It would show Homer and Lisa playing the game and wasting money. Jennifer Saunders was cast as Phoebe.

In honor of the 30th anniversary of the airing of the first Simpsons short on The Tracey Ullman Show, a scene from the first short, "Good Night", is shown at the start of the episode. It is followed by the couch gag that shows images from the history of The Simpsons while parodying the title sequence of The Big Bang Theory.

== Cultural references ==
Lisa sings a parody of the "Pokémon Theme" as they search for Phoebe. While Homer searches for Peekimon in the cemetery, one of the tombstones says, "Clinton Kaine 2016: I'M WITH HER."

== Reception ==
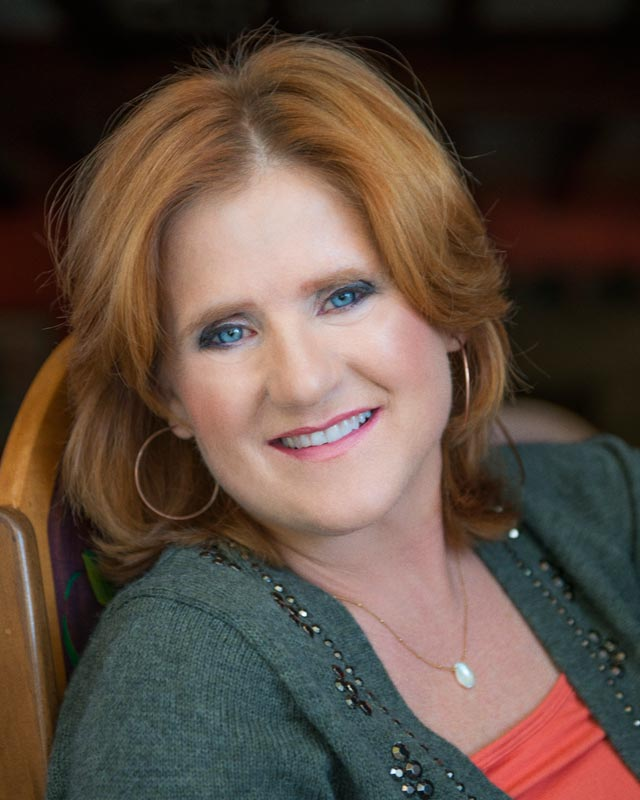
Nancy Cartwright received an Emmy nomination for her voice performance as Bart.

Dennis Perkins of The A.V. Club gave the episode a B, stating "'Looking for Mr. Goodbart' isn't boring. But it doesn't quite land as hard as it appears it's going to for a time. The script really does lay the foundation for it—Bart and Phoebe's mutual admiration makes sense in context, and both actors find the emotional truth there. I like how Phoebe's unimpressed reaction to Bart's scam turns to genuine appreciation once she, among other things, sees Bart enjoying nature (in the form of a losing fight with a praying mantis). Walking off with Bart, she talks about them going 'inside that Milhouse you love so much.' (She thought it was a house, don't be weird). Set straight, Saunders' offhand 'Oh well, there you go,' once last time, hints at the rounded person who gave Bart's little epiphany someone real to bounce off of.”

Tony Sokol of Den of Geek gave the episode 2/5 stars. He praised the premise and the performance of guest star Jennifer Saunders as Phoebe, but noted a lack of jokes and criticized an extended opening sequence as a way to fill time.

"Looking for Mr. Goodbart" scored a 1.0 rating with a 4 share and was watched by 2.30 million viewers, making it Fox's second highest rated show of the night.

For her performance as Bart, Nancy Cartwright was nominated for Outstanding Voice-Over Performance at the 69th Primetime Creative Arts Emmy Awards, which was awarded to Seth MacFarlane for the Family Guy episode "The Boys in the Band".

=== Controversy ===
Russian cable channel 2x2 refused to air the episode due to a scene in which Homer plays Peekimon Get in church. The scene was similar to an ongoing incident in Russia, in which atheist blogger Ruslan Sokolovsky was on trial for blasphemy, having made a video of himself playing Pokémon Go at the Church of All Saints, Yekaterinburg and claiming that he could not find Jesus because Jesus did not exist. Amnesty International called this "worrying self-censorship". The episode eventually aired in April 2018, but without the scene in question included in the airing.
