= Fatzcarraldo =

- The Simpsons episode
- Episode no.: Season 28; Episode 14
- Directed by: Mark Kirkland
- Written by: Michael Price
- Production code: WABF07
- Original air date: February 12, 2017

Guest appearance
- Glenn Close as Mona Simpson

Episode features
- Chalkboard gag: "If we're so good at predicting, how come my Dad bet on Atlanta?"
- Couch gag: The Simpsons, except Maggie, are sitting on the couch when Marge seems disgruntled. She stands up and moves the sailboat painting on the wall behind the couch to reveal a safe in the wall. She unlocks it, and Maggie is sitting inside. Marge lifts her out and sits down again, revealing several gold bars in the safe.

Episode chronology
← Previous "The Great Phatsby"	Next → "The Cad and the Hat"
- The Simpsons season 28

"Fatzcarraldo" is the fourteenth episode of the twenty-eighth season of the American animated television series The Simpsons, and the 610th episode of the series overall. The episode was directed by Mark Kirkland and written by Michael Price. It aired in the United States on Fox on February 12, 2017. The title is a spoof of the 1982 film Fitzcarraldo.

In this episode, Homer starts eating at a chili dog stand that he went to as a child while Lisa joins the school radio show. Glenn Close guest starred as Mona Simpson. The episode received mixed reviews.

This episode was dedicated in memory of animator Sooan Kim.

== Plot ==
After Homer wins a button-counting contest and is allowed to leave work early, Homer is happy until he sees Marge's sisters at home. Patty and Selma make the family go to the DMV awards, which they host. Homer leaves the awards show in rage. He goes to Krusty Burger, but they changed the menu to only serve healthy food. As he looks for another restaurant, he comes across a trailer that serves chili dogs and eats there.

The next day, Homer tells his family about the hot dog stand. Grampa says that when Homer was a boy, he took him there all the time. He and Mona went to a marriage counselor next to the hot dog stand. They left Homer there, and the owner gave him hot dogs. In the present, Patty and Selma have lost their jobs after overspending their awards show budget by $100,000, so they are going to live with the Simpsons for a while. Homer returns to the hot dog stand and asks the owner if he remembers him, but he does not. Homer brings popularity to the stand and costs Krusty Burger business.

Meanwhile, Springfield Elementary has a radio show run by the fourth graders and Lisa. Martin is worried about the show’s ratings, but Lisa only wants to report interesting stories. Lisa does an interview at detention, but Principal Skinner shuts down the radio station when funding runs out. Lisa feels sad, so Homer brings her to the hot dog stand to cheer her up. When they arrive, Homer learns the stand has been sold.

Krusty has bought the stand and plans to raise prices. Homer chains the stand to his car and drives off. Homer ends up on the news. Comic Book Guy leads a rebellion of obese dudes to save the stand while the local fast-food barons resolve to help Krusty get it back. On their drive, the stand, with Homer in it, goes off a bridge and is dangling from the chain. The owner of the stand comes to save Homer, revealing that he does remember Homer. He says that Homer does not need the stand, and Homer realizes it was the owner who helped get him through tough times and not the hot dogs. Homer lets the stand fall into the river. Bart and Marge collect Homer and say he has become a celebrity for his efforts to save the stand.

== Production ==
The episode was dedicated in memory of Sooan Kim, who was an animator on the show.

== Reception ==
Dennis Perkins of The A.V. Club gave the episode a C+, stating "The episode, credited to Michael Price, aims for the heart, but lacks the focus to hit it. Homer, mysteriously drawn to Deuce’s Caboose Chili Dogs in 'Seldom-Seen County,' bonds with the crusty 97-year-old owner for reasons he can’t quite recall. At least until Grandpa reminds Homer that the younger Deuce used to give him free chili dogs and call him H-Dog when young Homer waited out Abe and Mona’s fruitless attempts to save their marriage at a nearby counselor’s office. Flashing back to how Deuce’s kindness...were his only refuge from fear and loneliness, Homer has the breakthrough that that’s when he started eating his emotions. Fair enough. Sure, The Simpsons’ elastic reality makes groundbreaking revelations like these a matter of course, so we can forgive that we’ve never heard of Deuce before, and likely won't again. (A shame, since the always-dependable Kevin Michael Richardson should be upgraded to regular supporting cast by this point.)"

Tony Sokol of Den of Geek rated the episode 4.5 out of 5 stars, stating "The episode is loaded with great lines and sight gags....This is what The Simpsons should be about, nothing, not Seinfeld nothing, which could be anything. But the kind of nothing that is the nutritional value of most of what we plan on eating this week, only with extra karo syrup. The simple closing of a hot dog stand is a chance to make a last stand and to do it in a cannibalistically comic fashion."

"Fatzcarraldo" scored a 1.0 rating and was watched by 2.40 million people, making it Fox's highest rated show of the night.
