= A Father's Watch =

- The Simpsons episode
- Episode no.: Season 28; Episode 18
- Directed by: Bob Anderson
- Written by: Simon Rich
- Production code: WABF11
- Original air date: March 19, 2017

Guest appearances
- Vanessa Bayer as Dr. Clarity Hoffman-Roth; Brian Posehn as Dumlee; Rob Riggle as Dr. Fenton Pooltoy; Adam Silver as himself

Episode features
- Chalkboard gag: "Studying is not "appropriating nerd culture"". Later in the episode, there were two other gags: Lisa writes "Everybody's a winner" and later, Bart writes "I did nothing wrong this week".
- Couch gag: All the past and present Simpsons' pets are on the couch.

Episode chronology
← Previous "22 for 30"	Next → "The Caper Chase"
- The Simpsons season 28

"A Father's Watch" is the eighteenth episode of the twenty-eighth season of the American animated television series The Simpsons, and the 614th episode of the series overall. The episode was directed by Bob Anderson and written by guest writer Simon Rich. It aired in the United States on Fox on March 19, 2017.

In this episode, Marge gets parenting advice to give out participation trophies over Lisa's objections. Inspired, Homer opens a trophy store while Grampa gives Bart his watch after Homer calls him a loser. Vanessa Bayer, Brian Posehn, and Rob Riggle guest starred. National Basketball Association commissioner Adam Silver appeared as himself. Maggie Simpson does not appear in this episode. The episode received positive reviews and was watched by 2.4 million people. Rich was nominated for a Writers Guild of America Award for Television: Animation for his script to this episode.

== Plot ==
Two recently deceased frogs meet in heaven and say they are proud to have died for a noble cause: so Bart can dissect them in science class for the pursuit of knowledge. However, they are horrified and angry when Bart laughingly mutilates the body he left behind. Marge despairs over Bart's terrible report card, and goes to parenting expert Dr. Clarity Hoffman-Roth's lecture for advice. Following her recommendation of giving kids trophies for achieving either laughably simple tasks or doing absolutely nothing, Homer opens a trophy store. However, Bart volunteers to be the store's assistant and, after his shoddy work is revealed, Homer loses his temper and rants at length about what a "pathetic loser" Bart is and always will be, unaware that a devastated Bart has heard what he said.

Meanwhile, Lisa lashes out against the Trophy Culture – not least because her genuine achievements earn smaller trophies than the non-achievements of classmates like Ralph Wiggum. Bart visits Grampa and finds out that his great-grandfather (who is not shown but was mentioned in "The Winter of His Content" as being alive and estranged from Grampa) was a widely respected expert on child abuse in his day, and passed down a rare watch to Grampa, which Grampa then gives to Bart. Soon, Lisa causes a different movement by getting another parenting expert, Dr. Fenton Pooltoy, to speak to Springfield's parents, who says that too much praise creates millennials - in his words, "a generation of soft, entitled narcissists who drop out of college to become DJs", and his no trophies or false praise approach is embraced by the parents of Springfield. However, Lisa's plan backfires because Marge oversimplified it as "all trophies are bad" and throws out of all of Lisa's genuinely earned awards.

Meanwhile, Homer's trophy business success comes to a crashing halt, and a happy Bart flaunts Grampa's watch to Homer, who always wanted the watch as a symbol of his own father's respect that he never received, but Bart loses the watch in the forest near Springfield and badly injures Milhouse while failing to retrieve it. Grampa tells Bart they are going to be profiled for a little read magazine's issue on families, and Bart cannot tell him the truth because it would kill him.

When Homer takes his trophies to a pawn shop, he finds the watch (which Milhouse did find, but pawned in revenge for Bart dropping stones at him), planning to rub the recovery in Bart's face, but when he sees Bart is broken and tearful over the loss, he feels bad and gives the watch back to his son. Marge praises Homer's actions, and he says he is going with his gut - or specifically his GUT (Give Up Trying) approach. After their picture is taken for the magazine, Bart then breaks the watch by accident and Grampa tries to choke him.

The episode ends with Trophy Culture hitting its nadir at the NBA draft where NBA Commissioner Adam Silver announces that the kid with the most trophies has been selected: Ralph Wiggum, much to Lisa's chagrin. Homer then sings Joe Esposito's "You're the Best Around" over the credits.

== Production ==
This is the first episode written by Simon Rich. Rich met executive producer Matt Selman at a Fox event and asked to pitch ideas for the show. When he met with the producers on the Fox lot, he met creator Matt Groening, who commented that Rich was sitting in the same chair that Groening sat in when he pitched the series. They liked one of his ideas and told him to develop it.

Vanessa Bayer was cast as an expert Marge hires to encourage giving participation trophies. Rob Riggle was cast as an expert Lisa hires who holds the opposite view. Brian Posehn guest starred as a pawnshop owner. NBA Commissioner Adam Silver appeared as himself conducting an NBA draft.

== Reception ==
=== Critical response ===
Dennis Perkins of The A.V. Club gave the episode a B+, stating "It’s the moment Bart loses that watch that does it. 'A Father’s Watch' improbably winds together three story strands into a satisfyingly unified whole episode. I say 'improbably' because The Simpsons’ latter-day tendency to cram three potentially show-carrying plot devices into one undercooked outing is a constant, baffling weakness. But here, Marge’s worry about Bart’s perpetual underachiever status, Lisa’s scheme to undermine the resulting parental obsession with overpraising, and Bart’s relationship with his grandpa (cemented by the gift of a family heirloom), are all tended with care. Credit goes to first-time Simpsons writer Simon Rich, of Saturday Night Live and Man Seeking Woman fame, who roots each storyline's comic turns in the characters, all while coming up with some plain old good jokes, both in the meat of the episode, and in the fiddly bits around the margins...There’s a care in all the aspects of 'A Father’s Watch' which is most refreshing."

Tony Sokol of Den of Geek gave the episode three out of five stars, stating "Good lines, very funny lines, not quite as ever-flowing as has been this season’s usual. But a show about positive reinforcement doesn’t need quite so many lines to make the point. It just has to make the point repeatedly. Or in song, as Homer does often."

Tyler Clark of Consequence named this episode as the best episode of the season. Clark highlighted the commentary on parenting experts and the bond between Bart and Grampa. He also would have liked to have seen a full episode featuring the frogs.

In 2023, GameSpot named this episode as one of the 15 best episodes from seasons 20 through 34.

=== Viewing figures ===
"A Father's Watch" scored a 1.0 rating with a 3 share and was watched by 2.40 million people, making it Fox's highest-rated show of the night.

=== Awards and nominations ===
Simon Rich was nominated for a Writers Guild of America Award for Outstanding Writing in Animation at the 70th Writers Guild of America Awards for his script to this episode.
