= The Cad and the Hat =

- The Simpsons episode
- Episode no.: Season 28; Episode 14
- Directed by: Steven Dean Moore
- Written by: Ron Zimmerman
- Production code: WABF08
- Original air date: February 19, 2017

Guest appearances
- Magnus Carlsen as himself; Seth Green as the Robot Chicken Nerd; Patton Oswalt as Bart Simpson's Guilt

Episode features
- Couch gag: As the sailboat painting is stolen, Homer goes on search for it, walking through the animated sets of South Park and The California Raisins before finding it with the Robot Chicken nerd.

Episode chronology
← Previous "Fatzcarraldo"	Next → "Kamp Krustier"
- The Simpsons season 28

"The Cad and the Hat" is the fourteenth episode of the twenty-eighth season of the American animated television series The Simpsons, and the 611th episode of the series overall. The episode was directed by Steven Dean Moore and written by Ron Zimmerman. It aired in the United States on Fox on February 19, 2017.

In this episode, Lisa refuses to forgive Bart for throwing away her hat, which makes Bart feel increasingly guilty, while Homer finds he is talented at playing chess. Seth Green and Patton Oswalt guest starred. Chess champion Magnus Carlsen appeared as himself. The episode received negative reviews.

== Plot ==
The Simpsons go on a trip to the Springfield beachfront area. Whilst at the beach, Bart becomes angry over Lisa's good fortune when she becomes happy with a new sunhat she finds, while he becomes sad over the failure of his "Bad to the Bone" temporary tattoo because it is not waterproof. On their way home, Bart takes her hat while she sleeps in the car and tosses it out the window into a junkyard. When Lisa finds out that it is gone, she becomes inconsolable, leading Bart to receive the first visit from his "guilt monster", a slime-covered creature that reminds him of what he did, that grows and becomes progressively hideous the more Bart denies his guilt. After enough visits, Bart accepts his guilt and tells Lisa the truth, but she feels wounded by his actions and refuses his attempts to make amends with her. To redeem himself, Bart returns to the junkyard to recover the hat, only to discovers that it has become a part of a car that had been crushed into a cube, so he breaks the hat free from the car. However, when he gives the hat to Lisa, she bluntly rejects his apology and tells him to focus on being a brother to Maggie. Suddenly, Lisa has a vision of her own emotional spirit, who says that her brother was trying to make amends, so she forgives Bart.

Meanwhile, after being forced by Marge to do something other than leer at women beach volleyball players, Homer plays chess and finds he is of grandmaster strength, much to the shock of himself and everyone else. As Homer plays more chess, he realizes he used to play the game with Grampa as a way of bonding with him after his mother Mona left, but often lost to his father until he was given lessons in chess by a professor who lived nearby. After improving his game and finally beating Grampa, his father angrily refused to play against him anymore. Homer thinks his restored ability is an indication he secretly wants to kill Grampa. Taking advice from chess champion Magnus Carlsen, Homer encourages his father to play again with him. Homer allows him to win, in hopes of closing the wound from their past.

== Production ==
This is the first and only episode written by Ron Zimmerman before his death in 2022.

The couch gag was created by the producers of Robot Chicken. They previously created the couch gag for the twenty-fourth season episode "The Fabulous Faker Boy."

Chess champion Magnus Carlsen appeared as himself. Executive producer Al Jean said he would make Homer play a chess match with Grampa to test a theory. Patton Oswalt was cast as Bart's guilt, who appears after he throws away Lisa's hat. Oswalt previously appeared as a different character in the twenty-fourth season episode "The Day the Earth Stood Cool."

== Reception ==
=== Viewing figures ===
"The Cad and the Hat" scored a 1.1 rating and was watched by 2.44 million people, making it Fox's highest-rated show of the night.

=== Critical response ===
Dennis Perkins of The A.V. Club gave the episode a C+ stating, "'The Cad And The Hat' is the first credited Simpsons script from Ron Zimmerman, and, while bringing in new blood to the Simpsons’ writers room can be energizing, this episode betrays the series’ tone and internal rules to a distracting degree. Which might be interesting if it were bolder, or a lot funnier. As it is, the episode is dispiriting in how disposably it treats its world, while reaching for a pair of emotional epiphanies that fall flat in the execution."

Tony Sokol of Den of Geek gave the episode 2.5 out of 5 stars. He stated that in premise was promising, but guilt is not funny.

Vanessa West, analyzing the chess in the episode, liked the description of chess as a sport and the references to famous chess matches. However, she stated that Carlsen's character did not match his real personality, and she pointed out some errors in strategy and animation.

== Cultural references ==
- The title is a reference to the Dr. Seuss book The Cat in the Hat.
- The Robot Chicken themed couch gag parodies the California Raisins as well as South Park.
- When Homer comes back to the Simpson living room with the sailboat painting, he sees that Marge has hung a copy of Vermeer's Girl with a Pearl Earring in its place.
- Bart's personified guilt resembles Hugo Simpson from "Treehouse of Horror VII."
- Garfield makes an appearance as a costume in the Itchy and Scratchy episode "The Garfield Assassination."
