= The Town (The Simpsons) =

- The Simpsons episode
- Promotional poster
- Episode no.: Season 28; Episode 3
- Directed by: Rob Oliver
- Written by: Dave King
- Production code: VABF17
- Original air date: October 9, 2016

Guest appearances
- Bill Burr as Townie; Michael Chiklis as Handsome Quarterback; Rachel Dratch as Bostonian Doctor; Doris Kearns Goodwin as herself; Dana Gould as Murphy; Mike Mitchell as Jay; Jason Nash as Southie Criminals and Southie Philanthropists

Episode chronology
← Previous "Friends and Family"	Next → "Treehouse of Horror XXVII"
- The Simpsons season 28

"The Town" is the third episode of the twenty-eighth season of the American animated television series The Simpsons, and the 599th episode of the series overall. The episode was directed by Rob Oliver and written by Dave King. It aired in the United States on Fox on October 9, 2016.

In the episode, Bart enrages Homer by becoming a fan of the Boston Americans (a parody of the New England Patriots). Homer takes the family on a "hate-cation" to Boston to show Bart how bad the city is, but the family falls in love with the city and moves there. However, Bart soon discovers that Boston is not how he imagined it, and wants to go home.

"The Town" received positive reviews and was the most watched show on Fox that night, with an audience of 3.22 million. It was nominated for the Primetime Emmy Award for Outstanding Animated Program.

== Plot ==
Homer goes to Moe's Tavern to watch a football game between the Springfield Atoms and the Boston Americans, but they end up bitterly arguing with a group of Boston fans, calling their team cheaters and losers. Homer and the rest become enraged when the Americans win the game by throwing to their mascot, who was activated for the 53-man roster and reported in as an eligible receiver. Homer then says that he will lose his temper if he sees a Boston fan, but seconds later, he is surprised by a gleeful Bart wearing a Boston Americans cap, as his son makes it plain he hates the hometown Atoms and loves Boston. Homer gets angry at Bart, but he decides to take him around Springfield to encourage him to cheer for the home team. Bart refuses and admits that people from Boston, specifically Southies, are his people. Homer gets so traumatized that he decides to take the family on a "hate-cation" to Boston to show Bart what a terrible place it actually is.

During a visit to Faneuil Hall Marketplace, Homer unsuccessfully attempts to provoke the Bostonians when a cart full of bobbleheads falls on him. When he is helped by doctors, Marge is impressed with the Massachusetts health care system, as much as Lisa is impressed by the MIT campus. Meanwhile, Homer and Bart go candlepin bowling and, when Homer learns that the player gets a third ball in this version of the sport, he falls in love with both it and the city. Homer gives up on the hate-cation and decides to enjoy Boston with Bart. Back at the hotel, Marge and Homer talk about their experience in Boston and decide to move to the town, declaring the move to be their "third ball".

The Simpsons rent an apartment and move all their possessions to Boston. Homer finds a job at the NEKCO candy factory and Lisa enjoys attending the Combat Zone Charter School. However, Bart realizes that he can no longer keep his reputation as a bad boy in school, as the children in detention focused their energy into a cappella singing, and that most of the town is made for intellectuals like Lisa. He decides to find a way to make the family move back to Springfield. Bart takes the family to the latest championship parade for the Americans, who used questionable tactics to win the crown. Homer tries to control his anger, but he gets enraged when asked to put on a Boston Americans cap, ripping it in two and yelling that they are cheaters. The Simpsons then have to move back to Springfield, where Marge gets mad at Homer for making them lose that opportunity, but concludes that it would not have worked out for the family in Boston, as their problems are who they are, not where they are. Bart is now wearing a Springfield Atoms cap and Lisa, now insane, is hallucinating about Boston.

== Production ==
This episode was written by guest writer Dave King, who was working on the television series Love at the time. King played fantasy football with some of the series' writers, and they were looking for people to write an episode, which coincided with the production hiatus of Love. Executive producer Matt Selman was interested in making an episode set in Boston, and the writers knew King was fond of the city and its football team. After the episode was written, Selman would ask him for input when adding details and background jokes to the episode. Selman stated the episode would explore Boston's contradictions between progressive and educated people and the hooligan gangsters. Executive producer Al Jean said that the episode would be a thorough depiction of the city.

The episode was originally titled "Patriot Games", as seen in the script cover. However, the title was changed in January 2016 to "The Town". On Twitter, executive producer Matt Selman posted a still image from a deleted scene, in which Bart rides a city bike.

In July 2016 at San Diego Comic-Con, Selman stated that Doris Kearns Goodwin would appear in the episode. It was later reported that Massachusetts natives Bill Burr, Rachel Dratch, and Dana Gould would also guest star in the episode.

"The Town" was rerun by Fox on February 12, 2017, a week after Super Bowl LI, where the New England Patriots defeated the Atlanta Falcons 34–28 in the first-ever Super Bowl game to enter overtime. As an easter egg, the final score of the Boston vs. Springfield football game was changed to reference the real-life result of Super Bowl LI. Selman explained that his team had proposed the idea whilst watching the game, having realized that "The Town" had been scheduled for a rerun the following week. Although the idea was a joke, Al Jean took it seriously. He added that "jamming the Super Bowl teams and score into one shot makes no sense in the show, but we couldn't resist." The edit was exclusive to this airing. This episode was season 28, episode 3. The Patriots would win the Super Bowl overcoming a 28-3 deficit.

The episode features an a cappella rendition of the song "I'm Shipping Up to Boston" by the Celtic punk band Dropkick Murphys, which also plays over the closing credits.

== Cultural references ==
The Boston Americans are a parody of the New England Patriots; former Patriots player Rob Gronkowski is also parodied as "Bonkowski". The title is a parody of Ben Affleck's 2010 crime thriller film, The Town, while the episodes also references The Departed, another film set in Boston.

== Reception ==
=== Viewing figures ===
"The Town" scored a 1.5 rating and was watched by 3.22 million viewers, making it the most-watched show on Fox that night.

=== Critical response ===
"The Town" received positive reviews from critics.

Dennis Perkins of The A.V. Club gave the episode a B. He recognized writer Dave King's experiences from Harvard University and the sports blog, Fire Joe Morgan, and praised the cutting of the opening titles to fill the story.

Tony Sokol of Den of Geek gave the episode 3 out of 5 stars. He felt the episode was limited without the support from the other Springfield characters.

Screen Rant called it the best episode of the 28th season.

=== Awards and nominations ===
The episode was nominated for Outstanding Animated Program at the 69th Primetime Creative Arts Emmy Awards, losing to the Bob's Burgers episode, "Bob Actually".
