= The Last Traction Hero =

- The Simpsons episode
- Episode no.: Season 28; Episode 9
- Directed by: Bob Anderson
- Written by: Bill Odenkirk
- Production code: WABF03
- Original air date: December 4, 2016

Episode features
- Couch gag: The Simpson family finds no couch, and a firing squad enters and holds them against the wall in the style of The Third of May 1808.

Episode chronology
← Previous "Dad Behavior"	Next → "The Nightmare After Krustmas"
- The Simpsons season 28

"The Last Traction Hero" is the ninth episode of the twenty-eighth season of the American animated television series The Simpsons, and the 605th episode of the series overall. The episode was directed by Bob Anderson and written by Bill Odenkirk. It aired in the United States on Fox on December 4, 2016.

In this episode, Smithers bonds with Marge as he tries to make Homer sign a waiver after he is injured at work. The episode received positive reviews.

This episode marked Kevin Michael Richardson's first regular supporting cast appearance, having previously served as a recurring guest star.

== Plot ==
While searching for a parking spot, Homer realizes that Mr. Burns is away on a hunting trip and decides to help himself to Burns' lifestyle. While playing a round of golf in Burns' office, he accidentally trips the trapdoor controls and falls into a cement mixer. He is placed in traction and bed-ridden for several months as a result of his injuries. The Blue Haired Lawyer advises Mr. Burns that while the original trapdoor was legal, his decision to renovate it means that he is now legally liable for Homer's injuries. Burns dispatches Smithers to get Homer to sign a document waiving away a compensation claim.

Marge tries to spend time with Homer, but her ideas of fun—quilting and jigsaw puzzles—bore him. After several failed attempts at getting Homer's signature, Smithers admits that he thinks Homer has a case for compensation, and Homer calls a lawyer. Marge unexpectedly bonds with Smithers, discovering that he can provide the emotional intimacy that Homer cannot; for his part, Homer enjoys this arrangement because with her emotional needs met, Marge is more willing to be physically intimate with him.

Frustrated by his lack of progress and the upcoming civil suit, Burns issues an ultimatum to Smithers: get Homer to sign the waiver or be transferred to the company's nuclear plant in Chernobyl. Smithers reluctantly admits his predicament to Marge, choosing his job over their friendship. Homer overhears this, and realizing that Smithers makes Marge happy, approaches Burns and offers to sign a waiver on the condition that Smithers is allowed to keep his job. Burns agrees, and Homer feigns a fall on the steps of the courthouse so that his lawyer can file another suit. However, he accidentally drags Marge with him, and the two are hit by a truck. Both are put in traction, where they are cared for by an incompetent Grampa. Marge confesses her love for Homer because of his willingness to sacrifice a compensation claim worth millions of dollars for the sake of her happiness.

Meanwhile, a fight breaks out over seating arrangements on the Springfield Elementary bus. Lisa proposes a seating plan to Principal Skinner, who promotes her to bus monitor. While Lisa's enforced seating plan initially proves successful, the children begin to resent her. Lisa goes mad with power, planning enforced seating plans for the school cafeteria and kickball teams, and ignoring Bart's warnings about discontent on the bus. The children rebel, instigating chaos on the bus and embarrassing Lisa. Milhouse wisely sets her straight on why the bus, lunch time and even recess are meant to be crazy so everyone can be themselves. Realizing how right he and Bart are and taking responsibility for her own downfall, Lisa resolves never to be a know-it-all again, but only lasts a day before correcting Ms. Hoover's many errors in class.

== Reception ==
Dennis Perkins of The A.V. Club gave "The Last Traction Hero" a B+ stating, "A great contemporary Simpsons writer wants to show us how great The Simpsons still is, and how much he or she still loves it. 'The Last Traction Hero' is credited to longtime Simpsons writer and producer Bill Odenkirk, and it’s a really good episode of The Simpsons. Like his fine, low-key 'Super Franchise Me' from a few years ago, Odenkirk builds a story around the emotional heart of the characters, finds funny angles on old jokes, and populates his script with delightfully weird touches that make 'The Last Traction Hero' plain funny from start to finish. There’s nothing flashy about it. It’s just a fine episode of The Simpsons whose virtues appear effortless because of how well it just clicks into place in the show’s world."

Tony Sokol of Den of Geek gave the episode 4 out of 5 stars. He called the episode extremely funny and praised the sight gags.

"The Last Traction Hero" scored a 2.4 rating and was watched by 5.77 million people, making it Fox's highest rated show of the night.
