= The Great Phatsby =

- The Simpsons episodes
- Promotional poster
- Episode nos.: Season 28; Episodes 12 and 13
- Directed by: Chris Clements (Part 1); Timothy Bailey (Part 2)
- Written by: Dan Greaney; Matt Selman (Part 2 only)
- Production codes: WABF04 (Part 1); WABF05 (Part 2)
- Original air date: January 15, 2017

Guest appearances
- Charles Barkley as himself; Jim Beanz performing End Titles Music; Common as himself; Taraji P. Henson as Praline; Keegan-Michael Key as Jazzy James; Phil LaMarr as Auctioneer and Informed Party Guest; RZA as himself; Snoop Dogg as himself; Kevin Michael Richardson as Jay G

Episode chronology
← Previous "Pork and Burns"	Next → "Fatzcarraldo"
- The Simpsons season 28

"The Great Phatsby" is the twelfth and thirteenth episodes of the twenty-eighth season of the American animated television series The Simpsons, and the 608th and 609th episodes of the series overall. The first part was directed by Chris Clements and written by Dan Greaney. The second part was directed by Timothy Bailey and written by Dan Greaney and Matt Selman. The episodes aired in the United States on Fox on January 15, 2017. It was the first two-part episode of the series since "Who Shot Mr. Burns?" in 1995, though it was promoted and aired as the show’s first hour-long episode in its initial airing.

The episode is a parody of F. Scott Fitzgerald's 1925 novel The Great Gatsby, Jack Clayton's 1974 film version of the novel, Baz Luhrmann's 2013 film version of the novel, starring Tobey Maguire, and the 2015 Fox program Empire. In this episode, a wealthy, influential hip-hop artist steals Mr. Burns' fortune. Burns and Homer plot revenge on the thief. Taraji P. Henson, Keegan-Michael Key, and Phil LaMarr guest starred. Former basketball player Charles Barkley and hip hop artists Common, RZA, and Snoop Dogg appeared as themselves.

== Plot ==
=== Vol. I: The Betrayal ===
Mr. Burns is reminiscing about his past, mainly how he used to hold excessive parties at his estate at Middle Hampton, Lengthy Island. Smithers suggests he throw a new one to relive the past. Mr. Burns offers to organize the entire party himself, but relents and tasks Smithers to travel to Northern Canada to get a quarter ton of lake ice for the party. Smithers meets Homer and tells him about the party, handing him invitations to distribute. Homer decides to invite his family and some random citizens of Springfield to Mr. Burns' party. The party ends up being a failure thanks to Mr. Burns planning it too cheaply.

While being consoled by Homer after the party, Mr. Burns spots another party across the bay, and he gets the idea to crash it. At the party, Mr. Burns is impressed that the party is just like the ones he used to throw (though he notes that the way this party and his parties interpret the "white party" theme is very different). He then meets the host of the party, an elite hip hop artist named Jay G (Kevin Michael Richardson). Jay G is upset with the party crashers at first, but then he recognizes Mr. Burns and is excited to meet him, telling him that Mr. Burns' advice book, "The Rungs of Ruthlessness", was a major influence on his life and helped shape his Golden Goose empire. Jay G allows Mr. Burns and Homer to crash the party.

The following day, Homer's family explores Middle Hampton, and while visiting an ice cream shop, a rich boy named Blake Black cuts in front of them. Upon being scolded for doing so, Blake offers to pay for everyone's cones. Lisa is at first put off by Blake's behavior, but when Blake becomes infatuated with her and wants to hang out with her, she reconsiders her judgment of him. Meanwhile, Bart, upset by these recent developments in his family's lives, meets a scented candle salesman (Keegan-Michael Key), who offers to tell him about how Jay G ruined his chance at recognition if he buys one of his candles. Bart declines, being unimpressed by the cheapest candle available. Later, Lisa is once again put off by Blake when he commits unethical methods to enhance their whale watching experience and rejects him. Blake attempts to make up for Lisa by organizing a horse justice protest at a horse show, and just as she appears to be won over, another boy appears to offer her a chance to personally groom the horses, and she accepts, leaving Blake to lament that he redeemed himself for nothing and had to give up being "a douche".

Meanwhile, Mr. Burns and Jay G continue to bond, with Jay G giving Mr. Burns a special credit card with no spending limit as a gift to inspire him. Encouraged by Jay G, Mr. Burns goes on a spending spree with his new card, until he learns that he has gone bankrupt. It turns out that Jay G had designed the card to con Mr. Burns out of his entire fortune, and he joins Alicia Keys and his company goose mascot, Goosius, in laughing at his misfortune via a viral video. With all of Mr. Burns' assets absorbed into Jay G's empire, Mr. Burns finds himself at rock bottom.

=== Vol. II: The Revenge ===
Having lost everything to Jay G, and with Smithers still in Canada, Mr. Burns finds that the only person still loyal to him is Homer. He consults with Marge if he should continue to work at the Springfield Nuclear Power Plant, which is now under Jay G's ownership, and was redesigned, and learns that Marge's life in the Springfield Hamptons has driven her to become the most popular storekeeper in the Springfield Hamptons and she opened a small store specializing in adorable items, with Lisa as her assistant, employee, and servant, Bart is presumably killed by Jay G, and Maggie is Springfield Hamptons' mascot. Since the family cannot live off the store, Homer has no choice but to betray Mr. Burns and resume working at the plant, where Jay G has him throw out the remaining items from Mr. Burns' office and dismantle the trap door in his office as the last remnant of Mr. Burns' power. Jay G says Homer has proven himself and plies him with an unending supply of cobblers (including pineapple). Remorseful, Homer goes to Springfield Cemetery to vomit in an open grave and finds Mr. Burns commiserating at his family mausoleum. Homer vows never to return to the plant and help Mr. Burns get back at Jay G.

The following night, Homer and Mr. Burns are plotting their scheme when they discover that Bart is alive and well and has been spying on them. Since Homer never told Marge what he has been up to, Homer learns that he was declared a fugitive for stealing all of Jay G's albums. He gets the idea to let Mr. Burns bribe Bart to help them with their revenge. Bart gets Milhouse to use his "white nerd" knowledge of rap history to research Jay G's background and find a way to ruin his reputation.

As Milhouse presents his findings, Bart recognizes the candle salesman he met earlier, and Milhouse tells him that he is Jay's former writer, Jazzy James, who fell into obscurity after a falling-out. The group visits Jazzy, who explains that he wrote all the material for Jay G's first album, but could not make any money off it due to being forced to sign over all the rights. Jazzy is hired by the group to write a revenge rap directed at Jay G.

Homer visits Marge's store again and finds that she has become unhinged from running the store. Homer and Bart learn that she has been affected by the "curse of the adorable little store", as stores like Marge's exist since rich people want a place for their friends to hang out after spin class. Meanwhile, during a break from recording sessions for the revenge rap, Mr. Burns and the group meet Jay G's ex-wife Praline (Taraji P. Henson) who beats Homer savagely with a catering tray but also helps them by bringing in Common, RZA, and Snoop Dogg to form a group called Hate Squad, featuring the Rhyme Crime All-Stars.

On the night of the concert that is due to debut the revenge rap, Jay G appears to announce to Mr. Burns that he has bought the master recording of the revenge rap to dispose of it. Jazzy James and the other rappers turn on Mr. Burns by selling out to Jay G. While Jazzy James claims that Jay G is too good to be beaten, Praline states that she does not recall hating Jay G, while Common states that acts of betrayal are part of the Road of Life. Homer returns to Marge's store to confess his actions to her. Marge easily forgives him, citing his big heart for staying loyal to Mr. Burns. As Mr. Burns comes up with a new revenge scheme, Marge sells her store off as she can no longer afford it.

Mr. Burns enacts his plan by breaking into Jay G's mansion and capturing the goose mascot Goosius. Jay G comes out to feed Goosius, only to discover that he had seemingly been killed and cooked by Mr. Burns. As Jay G laments the loss of his mascot, it is revealed that Goosius is still alive, as Homer neglected to kill him and got a roast goose from the local gas station instead. Mr. Burns and Jay G give chase to Goosius, with Mr. Burns intending to kill him. They both end up hanging from a chandelier that is about to fall. With death seemingly imminent, Jay G reveals the real reason he betrayed Mr. Burns is that he was following the advice book, specifically the last page — "You will never be truly ruthless until you destroy the one who made you."

As Mr. Burns was his inspiration, bankrupting him was the final rung. As the chandelier plummets, Mr. Burns and Jay G are saved by the intervention of Smithers, who has returned from his adventure in Canada, although the lake ice he was tasked to collect had by now been reduced to slush.

In the end, the family returns home to Springfield; Marge, Lisa, and Maggie have escaped from the alleged curse; Bart is fully pardoned for his crime; and Mr. Burns, with his wealth and empire restored, attempts to incorporate a moment of musical appreciation into the daily shift at the power plant (although he starts to reconsider after the first time he enacts it).

== Production ==
In August 2016, co-chairman and CEO of Fox Television Group Dana Walden announced that the first one-hour episode of The Simpsons would air the following January. Although the episode "Who Shot Mr. Burns?" may be considered the first double-sized episode, the first part aired as the sixth season finale, and the second part aired as the seventh season premiere. The episode parodies the F. Scott Fitzgerald novel The Great Gatsby with Homer being the Nick Carraway character. Executive producer Matt Selman stated that it was originally planned as a regular episode, but after the table read, the producers decided to expand it to explore rap and hip-hop culture, which they had not explored in depth. Selman likened the episode as a two-part rap album with the first part subtitled "The Betrayal" and the second part subtitled "The Revenge." Executive producer James L. Brooks thought it was a fun concept and was excited about the episode.

Keegan-Michael Key was cast as rapper Jazzy James. Taraji P. Henson was cast as Praline, James' ex-wife. Selman described Praline as a Simpsons version of Cookie, Henson's character on the Fox television series Empire. Musicians Snoop Dogg, RZA, and Common were cast as themselves. Writer Dan Greaney stated that the producers wanted rappers who represented different parts of hip-hop.

Jim Beanz, who produced music for Empire, was hired to produce original songs for the episode, including betrayal and revenge raps. Beanz created eighteen songs for the episode, which was the most ever for a guest composer. He wanted the beats to sound like they were from an older era when he watched the show as a child but with a spin for the current day sound. He collaborated with Snoop Dogg, RZA, and Common for their raps to make it sound like something they would create. The rap lyrics were written by the show's writers, but the musicians added their own ideas to them. Greaney stated that the rappers elevated the lyrics that the writers created. Selman wanted to avoid having the Simpson family members rap and stated that the episode would not be a hip-hop musical but more like an episode of Empire.

However, Brooks did not like composer Alf Clausen's score for the episode, and Selman thought it could be better. Coupled with other revelations, it would lead to Clausen's firing at the end of the season.

At the announcement in 2016, executive producer Al Jean joked that he hoped the episode would not be the last one before a Donald Trump inauguration, which was the actual outcome.

== Reception ==
=== Critical response ===
Dennis Perkins of The A.V. Club gave the episode a B, stating "[...] the episode's charms are better than modest. If, as Selman says, 'The Great Phatsby' sort of mushroomed in the process, it's understandable, as guest stars Kevin Michael Richardson (as Burns' nemesis Jay G) and Keegan-Michael Key (as former Jay G musical collaborator Jazzy James) do stellar work in sizable roles. Richardson has done multiple spots on the show in recent years and is such a versatile and comfortable presence on The Simpsons that he's become something of an unofficial regular. And nobody has to sell Key at this point, as his ability to inhabit comic characters in short order is ideal for his role as the former rapper turned high-end candle salesman here. And with a brief but juicy role for Empire's Taraji P. Henson (as Praline, Jay G's very Cookie-like ex-wife who joins Mr. Burns revenge plan in the second half), and amusing cameos from real life rap royalty RZA, Common, and Snoop Dogg, there's enough legitimate blackness to make the whole 'Simpsons do a rap episode' thing less cringe-inducing than perhaps the initial description made it sound. Plus, the episode looks great."

Tony Sokol of Den of Geek gave the episode 3.5 out of 5 stars. He stated that the first half was better than the second half but said the episode was very funny.

Sheldon Pearce of The Guardian called the episode nonsensical and unfunny. He stated that the episode is full of cliches and that the best part is Lisa's romantic subplot.

=== Ratings ===
"The Great Phatsby" scored a 2.8 rating with an 8 share and was watched by 6.90 million people, making "The Simpsons" Fox's highest-rated show of the night.
