= Friends and Family (The Simpsons) =

- The Simpsons episode
- Episode no.: Season 28; Episode 2
- Directed by: Lance Kramer
- Written by: J. Stewart Burns
- Production code: VABF18
- Original air date: October 2, 2016

Guest appearance
- Allison Janney as Julia

Episode features
- Couch gag: An unseen player attempts to capture all of the Simpsons in the style of Pokémon Go, except Homer, who proclaimed he is too fat, and a hammer knocked him out.

Episode chronology
← Previous "Monty Burns' Fleeing Circus"	Next → "The Town"
- The Simpsons season 28

"Friends and Family" is the second episode of the twenty-eighth season of the American animated television series The Simpsons, and the 598th episode of the series overall. It aired in the United States on Fox on October 2, 2016. The episode was written by J. Stewart Burns and directed by Lance Kramer.

In this episode, Marge and the children are hired as Mr. Burns' family, so Homer bonds with his female neighbor while they are away. Allison Janney guest starred as Julia. The episode received positive reviews.

== Plot ==
Mr. Burns goes to an appointment with his psychiatrist to deal with his anger issues. Much to Burns' anger, Dr. Nussbaum gives up on his case after seventy years and says that he will never be able to have a family. Shortly after Burns leaves the room, the doctor dies. During his funeral, Burns pays for his tombstone which has "Paid for by C. Montgomery Burns" written on it, angering everyone there. Escaping from the angry mourners, Burns and Smithers accidentally run over Professor Frink who is wearing virtual reality glasses. Burns gets interested in the technology and takes it home where he has a lot of fun with them. However, Smithers reminds him that the last thing his doctor said was that he needed a family, and suggests programming a virtual reality family to test out this idea.

At the family tryouts, the Simpsons are the ones who stood out the most to Burns, so he decides to hire them. Burns has intended to be the father of the family, so Homer is sent back home. During the first recordings, Burns enjoys the experience and hires the Simpson family for ten years. At home, Homer misses his family at first, but he later realizes that he could have fun by himself. While lying naked on the roof at night, he meets his neighbor Julia. They quickly befriend each other over their love of beer and hatred towards Ned Flanders.

At the recordings, the rest of the Simpsons are already tired of their job and Burns, angry at them, gives up on starting a family and fires the Simpsons. When the family gets back home, Marge finds out about Homer's friendship with Julia. She gets angry, thinking that Homer is cheating on her with Julia, but when Julia comes in through the back door, she assures Marge that she and Homer are just friends and that she would not steal a man who is in a committed relationship. Julia leaves after telling Marge that she and Homer are lucky to have each other, and Marge, though she accepts Homer's friendship with Julia, is still a little angry with him. But after Homer explains some things that Julia taught him that can improve his relationship with Marge, she forgives him and they embrace, which is seen by Julia and her fiancé, who works as a pilot.

The episode ends by fast-forwarding a few years into the future showing most Springfieldians, including Homer and Marge, using virtual reality glasses.

== Production ==
In July 2016 at San Diego Comic-Con, it was announced that Allison Janney would guest star in an episode this season. Executive producer Al Jean described her character, Julia, as someone who likes beer and Homer, which upsets Marge, even though she has no romantic interest in Homer.

== Cultural references ==
"I Feel Free" by Cream is heard while Homer is at home. He watches the Police Academy films and ends up lying on the roof like Snoopy. Luigi tests Homer and Julia by having them eat spaghetti like the title characters in Lady and the Tramp. While Burns tests the virtual reality glasses, the Simpson children's heads briefly turn into Zoidberg from Futurama.

== Purported foreshadowing ==
In February 2024, viewers noticed similarities between this episode's virtual reality plot and usage of the Apple Vision Pro. There were reports of people on the subway or walking on the street wearing the Apple Vision Pro which was similarly depicted in the episode with characters wearing similar goggles. Social media posts declared the incident another prediction by the series.

== Reception ==
"Friends and Family" received positive reviews from critics.

Dennis Perkins of The A.V. Club gave the episode a B− stating, "Thankfully, while 'Friends And Family' never quite comes together, each story has its charms. Latter-day Simpsons has a bewildering tendency to jam two possible A-stories into the same episode, shorting them both. Here, the blame lies more with how damned long it takes to get to the plot(s), but, by the time the sweet ending rolls around...the consistent gags and smidge of heart wore me down."

Tony Sokol of Den of Geek rated the episode four of five stars commenting, "Lines aren’t everything, especially in animated entertainment and this episode has dozens of sight gags, many of them are happening in the background...I don’t use this word lightly, but this episode was excellent."

"Friends and Family" scored a 2.6 rating with a 9 share and was watched by 6 million people, making The Simpsons Fox's highest rated show of the night.
