= The Nightmare After Krustmas =

- The Simpsons episode
- Episode no.: Season 28; Episode 10
- Directed by: Rob Oliver
- Written by: Jeff Westbrook
- Production code: WABF02
- Original air date: December 11, 2016

Guest appearances
- Wayne Gretzky as himself; Theo Jansen as himself; Natasha Lyonne as Sophie; Jackie Mason as Rabbi Hyman Krustofsky

Episode features
- Couch gag: The Simpsons run to the couch, dressed as characters from A Christmas Carol (Homer is the Ghost of Christmas Present, Marge is Jacob Marley, Lisa is The Ghost of Christmas Past, Maggie is the Ghost of Christmas Future, and Bart is Tiny Tim). Mr. Burns (dressed as Ebenezer Scrooge) says "Smithers, release the Christmas hounds!" and hounds wearing jingle bells and reindeer antlers chase them off the couch.

Episode chronology
← Previous "The Last Traction Hero"	Next → "Pork and Burns"
- The Simpsons season 28

"The Nightmare After Krustmas" is the tenth episode of the twenty-eighth season of the American animated television series The Simpsons, and the 606th episode of the series overall. The episode was directed by Rob Oliver and written by Jeff Westbrook. It aired in the United States on Fox on December 11, 2016.

In this episode, Krusty converts to Christianity to be closer to his daughter Sophie while Maggie is scared by a gnome doll. Natasha Lyonne and Jackie Mason guest starred. Former hockey player Wayne Gretzky and artist Theo Jansen appeared as themselves. The episode received mixed reviews.

== Plot ==
When few people are present for Reverend Lovejoy's service on the fourth Sunday of Advent, Helen calls him for an intervention by Ned, Agnes, Sideshow Mel, the Parson, and the Patriarch, who demands he bring more people to the church. Meanwhile, the Simpsons attend a pagan festival. Theo Jansen shows his wind-powered sculpture, the Strandbeest, which tramples Krusty, who is ice-skating with his daughter Sophie. At the hospital, the Jewish Krusty tries to bond with his Christian daughter who wants to celebrate Christmas. Seeing their discomfort, Marge invites them to spend Christmas with the Simpsons. At home, Marge brings Maggie a Gnome in Your Home that watches her and tells Santa Claus what she has been doing. Krusty brings a crew to record his visit as a television special, angering Sophie who sends him away.

After failing to convert anyone, Lovejoy encounters Krusty, whom he converts after Krusty mistakes Snake being tased for an image of Jesus. During the Christmas church service, Lovejoy introduces the converted Krusty, and Sophie is happy. During Krusty’s updated show, the changes disappoint the kids in the audience. Meanwhile, Maggie has a nightmare where the Gnome talks to her and spits out finger tips. Finding herself at the North Pole, Maggie enters a cave, which turns into the Gnome's head and eats her. Maggie is woken by Marge on Christmas morning. Marge says the Gnome told her she has been good, and, to her horror, she will permanently leave him in her room. Maggie opens her present, which is a Mrs. Gnome in Your Home. That night, Marge and Homer find the Gnomes cut to pieces in their bed while Maggie sleeps happily.

Krusty prepares for his baptism in a frozen river. While approaching Lovejoy, he cracks the ice and falls underneath. He hallucinates the ghosts of his father and his first agent. His father says religion plays no role in being a good father, and he must put his children before himself. He is saved by Lovejoy who is praised as a savior, and people return to church for his service. Krusty returns to being Jewish.

Later, Sideshow Mel's wife leaves him, and Maggie destroys more Gnomes. The Christian God and the Jewish God argue whether Krusty received baptism by falling underwater but are interrupted by a drunk Ahura Mazda, God of Zoroastrianism. Krusty and Sophie sing together while being carried by the Strandbeest.

== Production ==
With this episode, Wayne Gretzky became the first hockey player to lend his voice to The Simpsons. He had been written in an early draft of the season six episode "Lisa on Ice" but was eventually cut. Jackie Mason reprised his role as Rabbi Krustofsky who had died in the twenty-sixth season episode "Clown in the Dumps." Natasha Lyonne took over the role of Sophie Krustofosky from Drew Barrymore, who voiced her in the twelfth season episode "Insane Clown Poppy." Barrymore would later voice herself after retiring from the role of Sophie in 2022's "The King of Nice." Artist Theo Jansen appeared as himself displaying his Strandbeest sculpture.

== Cultural references ==
The Parson's manner is a parody of Bing Crosby's character from the 1944 film Going My Way. The Gnome in Your Home is a parody of The Elf on the Shelf dolls. Krusty's father appears in the body of the snowman from the 2013 film Frozen.

== Reception ==
Dennis Perkins of The A.V. Club gave the episode a B−, saying "There's nothing wrong with the idea in theory—Dan Castellaneta and Harry Shearer always sink their teeth into Krusty's ravenous fame-grubbing and Lovejoy's sepulchral sententiousness, respectively, with enthusiasm. And a B-character taking the wheel for an episode can be a spur to fresh storytelling. But, while there's a bracingly irreverent take on religion throughout the episode, the Lovejoy and Krusty show isn't especially compelling on its own."

Tony Sokol of Den of Geek gave "The Nightmare After Krustmas" 4.5 stars, stating, "'The Nightmare After Krustmas' gives us everything except a non-denominational seasonal special, but is a present anyone can open...(A)lmost every line is a skewered shot of eggnog spiked with subversive holiday cheer. Even the setups. The visual gags are aplenty and the whole episode is lit with wit."

"The Nightmare After Krustmas" scored a 2.3 rating with an 8 share and was watched by 5.60 million viewers, making it Fox's highest rated show of the night.
