= Dad Behavior =

- The Simpsons episode
- Episode no.: Season 28; Episode 8
- Directed by: Steven Dean Moore
- Written by: Ryan Koh
- Production code: WABF01
- Original air date: November 20, 2016

Guest appearance
- Matt Leinart as himself

Episode features
- Chalkboard gag: "I will watch all 600 episodes without sleeping"
- Couch gag: Following an altered opening sequence where Barney destroys Bart's skateboard and the rest of the family dies in various ways, Bart, alone at home, gathers portraits of his family on the couch, exclaims, "Oh, finally, I get the remote!" and turns on the TV.

Episode chronology
← Previous "Havana Wild Weekend"	Next → "The Last Traction Hero"
- The Simpsons season 28

"Dad Behavior" is the eighth episode of the twenty-eighth season of the American animated television series The Simpsons, and the 604th episode of the series overall. It first aired on the Fox network in the United States on November 20, 2016. The plot revolves around Homer discovering an app that makes his life easier, and Grampa learning that he's about to become a father again. It was the first episode to be written by Ryan Koh, and was directed by Steven Dean Moore. Matt Leinart makes a guest appearance as himself.

== Plot ==
Whilst attempting to put together Scandinavian flat-packed furniture, Homer manages to get stuck in a cabinet he has assembled. To help him escape, Barney recommends to him a new app called "Chore Monkey" that makes its user's life easier by assigning contractors to perform menial tasks for the user. Homer begins to use the app for all his unwanted tasks, and solicits a Chore Monkey called Blake, who is an ex-hostage negotiator, to argue with Marge in his place. Homer then uses Chore Monkey Gold—the app's premium subscription tier—to hire a substitute father figure for Bart. However he soon becomes jealous of the easy rapport between this Chore Monkey—Matt Leinart—and his son. Homer briefly hires a Chore Monkey named Tyler to act as a substitute son, but the two squabble, leading to Tyler blackballing the Simpsons' house.

After attempting to video a premeditated "accident" for submission to America's Funniest Home Videos, Milhouse and his father, Kirk Van Houten, fall out. Homer attempts to spend time with Grampa, who has been informed that he's impregnated a fellow (unnamed) resident of his retirement home, and is nervous since he believes that Simpson men do not make good fathers. Midway through a game of Monopoly, Bart discovers that Matt is following a Chore Monkey script, rather than bonding with him naturally. Homer and Milhouse bond whilst topping up the engine oil of Homer's car, and cooking engine block pizza. Bart in turn becomes jealous of the time Homer and Milhouse are spending together.

Whilst playing videogames with Bart, Homer fantasizes about playing with Milhouse instead, before taking the latter out on a fishing trip to the park. Out with Marge at the same park, Grampa reflects that his own relationship with his father was just as dysfunctional as his relationship with Homer. Upon noticing Homer and Milhouse (whom he mistakes as Bart) fishing, Grampa reminisces that he still has the chance to be a good father. Bart meets up with Kirk in the Van Houten's garage. Grampa discovers that his girlfriend got pregnant by Jasper Beardsley instead of him, and is first shocked, but then immensely relieved. Bart and Kirk head to Itchy and Scratchy Land, only to find that Homer and Milhouse are also visiting the theme park. The two pairs of characters begin a go-kart race, but after Kirk crumbles under the pressure and brakes suddenly, Bart flies out of the kart and hits a stop sign. Homer rushes to help him, apologizing for his earlier obstinance. Bart calls him "dad", which pleases Homer greatly, and the two rekindle their relationship. Despite Kirk confessing that riding in a go-kart with Bart was the best time of his life, he and Milhouse also make up. The four characters all ride out of the park, stealing two of the theme park's go-karts.

In an epilogue Blake negotiates with Maggie, trying to get her to spit out her pacifier, but fails. Bart, Homer and Abe watch baseball together.

== Production ==
This was the first episode of The Simpsons where the animation was produced by Fox Television Animation.

The episode was the first to be written by Ryan Koh, and was additionally his debut episode as co-executive producer of the series. Koh has since written two further episodes of the series; "Singin' in the Lane" from season twenty-nine, and "Krusty the Clown" from season thirty. For the latter of these episodes, he was nominated for a Writers Guild of America Award for Outstanding Writing in Animation at the 71st Writers Guild of America Awards. It was the first episode to be table-read for season twenty-eight.

Interviewed about his role in the episode, Matt Leinart stated that he had been a long-time fan of the show, and that it was "one of those bucket list things. Doing voiceovers for The Simpsons is like...so crazy".

== Themes and cultural references ==
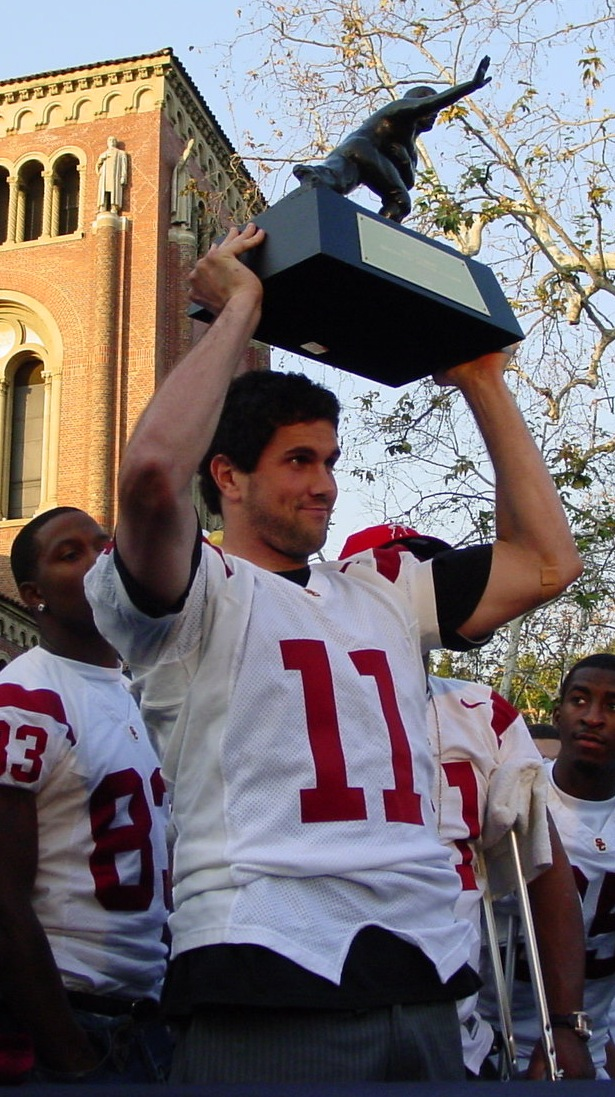
Matt Leinart guest starred as himself in the episode.

Chore Monkey is a parody of the app TaskRabbit, and Barney has an app on his phone called "Uburp", which is a parody of Uber. After discovering Chore Monkey, Homer sings a parody of the chorus of the Steely Dan song Dirty Work. A parody of an It Gets Better poster with a picture of a grave is displayed in the retirement castle. Matt Leinart slightly deflates the football he and Bart are playing catch with, in a reference to Deflategate. Grampa asserts that 'Grave Date' and 'Friends With Social Security Benefits' are popular dating apps among the residents of his retirement home. Matt states that he has played a Heisman Trophy edition of Trivial Pursuit. After smearing engine oil over Milhouse's face in the shape of a mustache, Homer remarks that he looks like Tony Stark. Homer and Bart play a videogame titled "PGA Tour of Duty", a portmanteau of Call of Duty Zombies and the PGA Tour series, in which a representation of Bing Crosby appears as a zombie non-player character. Grampa's memory of his father is depicted in the animation style of Popeye. The stamp on the envelope which Kirk boils is a Forever Stamp. Homer sings a parody of the sea shanty Drunken Sailor to Marge. Prior to the episode, Marge and Lisa have fallen out because Marge has thrown out Lisa's copies of the Utne Reader. Itchy and Scratchy Land is a parody of Disneyland, and its ride "Itchy and Scratchy's Injury 500" is a reference to the Indy 500. The episode is dedicated to the American sportscaster Vin Scully. Music played during the episode's race sequence and end credits was composed by Alf Clausen and Greg Prechel, and is an homage to the songs from the Fast and the Furious franchise.

In an article on Queer Theory that analyses the episode, Jonathan Hay relates the episode's unconventional opening credits sequence and Grampa's jubilation at realizing he is not a father to Lee Edelman's concept of reproductive futurity, as proposed in his 2004 monograph 'No Future: Queer Theory and the Death Drive'. Hay writes that:

After Maggie drives the car she and her mother are sat in into a lake, Marge's corpse soon floats to the surface, yet, although it seems inevitable that she too must have died, Maggie's corpse is pointedly not depicted. For the episode to kill Maggie would be for the episode to kill the image of the Child and thus expose the illusory nature of a social order which perpetually defers the achievement of an Imaginary wholeness onto its ensuing generations. Accordingly, the dismal portrayal of Marge's corpse figures as an uncompromising admonition of her ineptitude in having (somehow) left her child unsupervised in the front seat of her car, endangering the safety of the image of the Child which forms the symbolic guarantee of reproductive futurism."

== Reception ==
Dennis Perkins of The A.V. Club gave "Dad Behavior" a B− stating:

In short, there's nothing especially wrong with 'Dad Behavior,'...That the episode doesn't turn out more memorably for all that is one of those elusive near-misses that's maddeningly tough to pin down. In the end, the lack of stakes is what undermines the story. Bart and Homer's estrangement just doesn't feel weighty or immediate enough.

Tony Sokol of Den of Geek scored the episode 4.5 out 5 stars stating:

The episode is very funny, very clever and ends on a classic sequence...Although The Simpsons play out the family jealousies a lot, this one kept it fresh...Tonight's highlight was the rising orchestral tension in the scene where Abe finds out about the baby's lineage. The music builds on Abe's face, the mother's face and lingers on Jasper's beard. Thrilling. Chilling. Ultimately freeing.

In addition, the episode's couch gag itself was commented on by reviewers. Lucy Morris of Digital Spy felt that the couch gag was bleak, and a strange departure from the show's usual opening sequences. She noted however that Bart finally getting control of the TV remote was a welcome "silver lining" to the numerous traumatic deaths of his immediate family members within the couch gag. Caroline Westbrook of Metro also felt that the sequence was "pretty darned grim", but noted that it was not the series' first significantly weird couch gag.

"Dad Behavior" scored a 1.3 rating and was watched by 2.88 million people, making it Fox's highest rated show of the night. However, this was a significant decrease from the previous episode, "Havana Wild Weekend", which acquired a 3.1 rating, and was watched by 7.13 million people.
