= Steven Dean Moore =

American animation director

- Notable work: The Simpsons, Rugrats

Steven Dean Moore is an American director. His credits include 87 episodes of the animated television series The Simpsons, being the director who helped the most episodes of the series, and several episodes of the animated television series Rugrats. Moore was also one of four sequence directors on The Simpsons Movie (2007). He was nominated for an Emmy Award in 2002.

== The Simpsons episodes directed ==
=== Season 6 ===
- "'Round Springfield"

=== Season 7 ===
- "Marge Be Not Proud"
- "Homer the Smithers"

=== Season 8 ===
- "A Milhouse Divided"
- "The Springfield Files"
- "The Itchy & Scratchy & Poochie Show"
- "In Marge We Trust"

=== Season 9 ===
- "The Principal and the Pauper"
- "The Two Mrs. Nahasapeemapetilons"
- "The Joy of Sect"
- "King of the Hill"

=== Season 10 ===
- "Bart the Mother"
- "Treehouse of Horror IX"
- "Sunday, Cruddy Sunday"
- "Mom and Pop Art"

=== Season 11 ===
- "Beyond Blunderdome"
- "Eight Misbehavin'"
- "Missionary: Impossible"
- "It's A Mad, Mad, Mad, Mad Marge"

=== Season 12 ===
- "Lisa the Tree Hugger"
- "New Kids on the Blecch"

=== Season 13 ===
- "The Blunder Years"
- "She of Little Faith"
- "Blame It on Lisa"

=== Season 14 ===
- "Bart vs. Lisa vs. the Third Grade"
- "The Great Louse Detective"
- "'Scuse Me While I Miss the Sky"

=== Season 15 ===
- "Treehouse of Horror XIV"
- "'Tis The Fifteenth Season"
- "Smart and Smarter"
- "Bart-Mangled Banner"

=== Season 16 ===
- "Homer and Ned's Hail Mary Pass"
- "The Heartbroke Kid"

=== Season 17 ===
- "Milhouse of Sand and Fog"
- "Simpsons Christmas Stories"
- "Million Dollar Abie"

=== Season 18 ===
- "Jazzy and the Pussycats"

=== Season 19 ===
- "All About Lisa"

=== Season 20 ===
- "Mypods and Boomsticks"
- "Take My Life, Please"
- "Coming to Homerica"

=== Season 21 ===
- "O Brother, Where Bart Thou?"
- "Stealing First Base"
- "Judge Me Tender"

=== Season 22 ===
- "The Fool Monty
- "A Midsummer's Nice Dream"

=== Season 23 ===
- "Bart Stops to Smell the Roosevelts"
- "The Man in the Blue Flannel Pants"
- "Exit Through the Kwik-E-Mart"

=== Season 24 ===
- "Treehouse of Horror XXIII"
- "To Cur with Love"
- "What Animated Women Want"
- "Dangers on a Train"

=== Season 25 ===
- "White Christmas Blues"
- "The War of Art"

=== Season 26 ===
- "Clown in the Dumps"
- "Covercraft"
- "Waiting for Duffman"

=== Season 27 ===
- "Treehouse of Horror XXVI"
- "Paths of Glory"
- "Lisa the Veterinarian"

=== Season 28 ===
- "Treehouse of Horror XXVII"
- "Dad Behavior"
- "The Cad and the Hat"
- "Dogtown"

=== Season 29 ===
- "Mr. Lisa's Opus"
- "Fears of a Clown"

=== Season 30 ===
- "Heartbreak Hotel"
- "Daddicus Finch"
- "I Want You (She's So Heavy)"
- "Woo-Hoo Dunnit?"

=== Season 31 ===
- "Bobby, It's Cold Outside"
- "Frinkcoin"

=== Season 32 ===
- "Treehouse of Horror XXXI"
- "Three Dreams Denied"
- "Manger Things"

=== Season 33 ===
- "Bart's in Jail!"
- "Portrait of a Lackey on Fire"
- "Bart the Cool Kid"

=== Season 34 ===
- "Not It"
- "When Nelson Met Lisa"
- "Hostile Kirk Place"

=== Season 35 ===
- "Homer's Crossing"
- "Frinkenstein's Monster"
- "The Tell-Tale Pants"

=== Season 36 ===
- "The Man Who Flew Too Much"

=== Season 37 ===
- "Men Behaving Manly"
