= Robert McKee =

American author, lecturer and story consultant (born 1941)

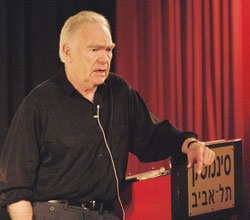
- McKee at the Story Seminar given at the Tel Aviv Cinematheque, October 2005
- Born: Robert Mckee; January 30, 1941 (age 85); Detroit, Michigan, U.S.
- Education: University of Michigan
- Occupations: Author; lecturer; story consultant
- Website: mckeestory.com

Robert McKee (born January 30, 1941) is an author, lecturer and story consultant who is known for his Story Seminar, which emerged from a doctoral project which he started but failed to complete at the University of Michigan, and which he further developed while teaching at the University of Southern California. McKee also has the blog and online writers' resource Storylogue. McKee's Story Seminars have been held around the world. The three-day seminar teaches writers McKee's principles of storytelling. McKee's one-day Genre Seminars teach writers McKee's take on the conventions of different styles of storytelling.

== Early life in the theater ==
Robert McKee began his theater career at the age of nine, playing the title role in a community theater production of Martin the Shoemaker. He continued acting as a teenager in theater productions in his hometown of Detroit, Michigan. Upon receiving the Evans Scholarship, he attended the University of Michigan and earned a bachelor's degree in English Literature.

After completing his Bachelor of Arts degree, McKee toured with the APA (Association of Producing Artists) Repertory Company, appearing on Broadway alongside Helen Hayes, Rosemary Harris and Will Geer. He then received the Professional Theater Fellowship and returned to Ann Arbor, Michigan, to earn his master's degree in Theater Arts.

== Mid-life in the film industry ==
After deciding to move his career to film, McKee attended Cinema School at the University of Michigan. While there, he directed two short films: A Day Off, which he also wrote, and Talk To Me Like The Rain, adapted from a one-act play by Tennessee Williams. These two films won the Cine Eagle Award, awards at the Brussels and Grenoble Film Festivals, and prizes at the Delta, Rochester, Chicago and Baltimore Film Festivals.

In 1979, McKee moved to Los Angeles, where he began to write screenplays and work as a story analyst for United Artists and NBC. He sold his first screenplay Dead Files to AVCO/Embassy Films, after which he joined the WGA (Writers Guild of America). His next screenplay, Hard Knocks, won the National Screenwriting Contest, and since then McKee has had eight feature film screenplays purchased or optioned, including the feature film script Trophy for Warner Bros. (Only one of these films, however, was produced). In addition to his screenplays, McKee has had a number of scripts produced for television series such as Quincy, M.E., Mrs. Columbo, Spenser: For Hire and Kojak. McKee was also an early instructor at the Los Angeles film school, Sherwood Oaks Experimental College.

== Starting the STORY seminar ==
In 1983, as Fulbright Scholar, McKee joined the faculty of the School of Cinema-Television at the University of Southern California (USC), where he began offering his STORY Seminar class. A year later, McKee opened the course to the public, giving a three-day, 30-hour intensive class to sold-out audiences around the world.

Since 1984, more than 50,000 students have taken McKee's course in cities around the world: Los Angeles, New York, London, Paris, Sydney, Toronto, Boston, Las Vegas, San Francisco, Helsinki, Oslo, Munich, Tel Aviv, Auckland, Singapore, Barcelona, Stockholm, São Paulo and more. In March 2011 and again in 2012, he taught a four-day seminar in Bogotá, Colombia. In February 2012, he taught another four-day seminar in the Ramoji film city of Hyderabad in India. He did the same in Amsterdam, March 2014.

McKee's current lecture series includes the three-day "Story Seminar", one-day "Genre Seminars" (teaching the conventions of love story, thriller, comedy, horror, action and writing for television) and the one-day "Storynomics Seminar", teaching the application of storytelling principles in the business and marketing world (co-lectured with CEO of Skyword Tom Gerace).

McKee continues to be a project consultant to major film and television production companies, corporations and governments around the world, as well as major software firms such as Microsoft. In addition, several companies such as ABC, Disney, Miramax, PBS, Nickelodeon, and Paramount regularly send their creative and writing staffs to his lectures.

== Life and awards ==
Writers and actors such as Geoffrey Rush, Paul Haggis, Akiva Goldsman, William Goldman, Joan Rivers, David Bowie, Kirk Douglas, John Cleese, Tony Kaye, and Steven Pressfield, have taken his seminar.

In 2000, McKee won the 1999 International Moving Image Book Award for his book Story (Regan Books/HarperCollins). The book has become required reading for film and cinema schools at Harvard, Yale, UCLA, USC and Tulane universities. The book was on the Los Angeles Times best-seller list for 20 weeks. It is translated into more than 20 languages.

In 2017, McKee was inducted into the Hall of Fame at the Final Draft Awards, an honor that recognizes professionals who have had a "profound influence on the industry" joining peers such as Lawrence Kasdan and Steven Zaillian.

McKee's other credits include writing and presenting the BBC series Filmworks, the Channel 4 series Reel Secrets, the BAFTA Award-winning J'accuse Citizen Kane television program which he wrote and presented, and the writing of Abraham, the four-hour mini-series on Turner Network Television (TNT) that starred Richard Harris, Barbara Hershey and Maximilian Schell.

== Criticism ==
A critical article published in Vanity Fair in 2009 asserted that "McKee often has no idea what he's talking about" and described a culturally insensitive interaction with a Japanese attendee at one of his seminars.

When Story was first published by HarperCollins in 1997, its jacket described McKee as "a Ph.D. in cinema arts", but a New Yorker article in 2003 reported that McKee in fact failed to complete his doctorate. Some articles for which McKee was interviewed imply he completed his doctorate and do not appear to have been corrected.

A further New Yorker article in 2023 noted that Story "exudes a hostility" towards any screenwriting practice that challenges or breaks conventions, and that "McKee has become a byword for screenwriting structures as cynical and manipulative as they are widely employed."

Film scholars such as Barry Langford have described the pronouncements of self-styled story gurus such as McKee, Syd Field and Christopher Vogler as "deadening and ubiquitous contemporary norms" and "infantile bromides".

McKee has been criticized by screenwriter Joe Eszterhas for teaching screenwriting without ever having had one of his scripts made into a film. McKee has responded to such criticisms, noting that "the world is full of people who teach things they themselves cannot do" while admitting that even though he has sold all of his screenplays, he still lacks screen credits for them since they were never produced by the studios that bought them, only optioned. In fact, McKee does have at least one known credit: as writer of the 1994 TV movie Abraham.

Many of the ideas he discusses have been around since Aristotle and appear in the work of William Archer. In interviews, McKee credits the basis for much of what he teaches and his writing on conflict and drama to Aristotle and the teaching of Kenneth Thorpe Rowe. He claims that much of what he teaches was common knowledge 50 or 60 years ago, but that screenwriters have lost touch with the fundamentals of storytelling. In a CBC interview he said that to give his lecture in the 1930s, '40s or '50s "would have been ludicrous".

== Anecdotes ==
- McKee claims in his seminars that he does not say not to use voice-over narration. There is some truth to the scene in Adaptation, however, as he vehemently teaches that using voice-over to substitute for telling the story via action and dialogue is weak, whereas he teaches that voice-over used to counterpoint and enrich the story can be wonderful.
- In a Haaretz article, McKee was quoted as saying in front of a Tel Aviv audience that Israelis have a rough sense of humor, completely different from the known worldwide Jewish one, since Israelis are living in a harsh reality which leads them to lose their sense of humor.

== Books ==
- Story: Substance, Structure, Style and the Principles of Screenwriting (1997)
- Dialogue: the Art of Verbal Action for Stage, Page and Screen (2016)
- Storynomics: Story-Driven Marketing in the Post-Advertising World (2018) with Thomas Gerace
- Character: The Art of Role and Cast Design for Page, Stage, and Screen (2021)
- Action: The Art of Excitement for Screen, Page, and Game (2022) with Bassem El-Wakil
