= The Simpsons season 26 =

Season of television series

The Simpsons
- Season 26
- Digital purchase image featuring Duffman
- Showrunners: Matt Selman (4 episodes); Al Jean
- No. of episodes: 22

Release
- Original network: Fox
- Original release: September 28, 2014 – May 17, 2015

Season chronology
- ← Previous; Season 25 Next → Season 27

The twenty-sixth season of the American animated sitcom The Simpsons aired on Fox between September 28, 2014, and May 17, 2015. The season was produced by Gracie Films and 20th Century Fox Television. The season was ordered by Fox on October 4, 2013. The primary showrunner for the season was Al Jean. In May 2015, the series was renewed for a twenty-seventh and twenty-eighth season.

In this season, Krusty the Clown retires after his father dies ("Clown in the Dumps"); Homer and Bart attempt to solve some father/son conflicts ("The Wreck of the Relationship"); Marge opens a sandwich franchise ("Super Franchise Me"); the Simpsons meet their former (The Tracey Ullman Show) selves ("Treehouse of Horror XXV"); Mr. Burns finds a girlfriend in Democratic Assemblywoman Maxine Lombard ("Opposites A-Frack"); Bart schemes to bring down his new fourth grade teacher, Mr. Lassen (guest voice Willem Dafoe), who is a terrible bully ("Blazed and Confused"); Homer has a mid-life crisis ("Covercraft"); and the cast of Futurama make an appearance in Springfield in a crossover episode ("Simpsorama").

Additional guest voices for this season include Nick Offerman, David Hyde Pierce, Jeff Ross, and Matthew Sweet.

The season received positive reviews. Actor Hank Azaria won the Emmy Award for Outstanding Character Voice-Over Performance this season. The season was also nominated for four other Emmy Awards, three Writers Guild of America Awards and one Annie Award.

== Voice cast & characters ==
=== Main cast ===
- Dan Castellaneta as Homer Simpson, Krusty the Clown, Sideshow Mel, Mr. Teeny, Itchy, Santa's Little Helper, Grampa Simpson, Gil Gunderson, Squeaky-Voiced Teen, Groundskeeper Willie, Rich Texan, Mayor Quimby, Barney Gumble, Kodos, Hans Moleman, Smitty, Arnie Pye, Snowball II, Benjamin and various others
- Julie Kavner as Marge Simpson, Selma Bouvier and Patty Bouvier
- Nancy Cartwright as Bart Simpson, Nelson Muntz, Kearney Zzyzwicz, Todd Flanders, Ralph Wiggum, Database and various others
- Yeardley Smith as Lisa Simpson and Grandma Flanders
- Hank Azaria as Chief Wiggum, Cletus Spuckler, Bumblebee Man, Carl Carlson, Moe Szyslak, Apu Nahasapeemapetilon, Sea Captain, Professor Frink, Superintendent Chalmers, Wiseguy, Comic Book Guy, Charlie, Disco Stu, Officer Lou, Kirk Van Houten, Old Jewish Man, Julio, Snake, Luigi Risotto, Drederick Tatum, Dr. Nick Riviera, Duffman, Sam, Doug and various others
- Harry Shearer as Kent Brockman, Otto Mann, Scratchy, Lenny Leonard, Ned Flanders, Reverend Lovejoy, Mr. Burns, Waylon Smithers, Kang, Principal Skinner, Dr. Marvin Monroe, Dewey Largo, Dr. Hibbert, Rainier Wolfcastle, Sanjay Nahasapeemapetilon, God, Judge Snyder, Officer Eddie, Slava, Jasper Beardly, Gary and various others

=== Supporting cast ===
- Pamela Hayden as Milhouse Van Houten, Jimbo Jones, Rod Flanders and various others
- Tress MacNeille as Dolph Shapiro, Shauna Chalmers, Brandine Spuckler, Linda, Ndnd, Myra, Bernice Hibbert, Crazy Cat Lady, Kumiko Albertson, Mrs. Muntz, Agnes Skinner, Mrs. Glick, Lunchlady Dora and various others
- Chris Edgerly as additional characters
- Maggie Roswell as Elizabeth Hoover, Luann Van Houten, Helen Lovejoy and Maude Flanders
- Russi Taylor as Martin Prince and Üter Zörker

== Episodes ==
No. overall	No. in season	Title	Directed by	Written by	Original release date	Prod. code	U.S. viewers (millions)
553	1	"Clown in the Dumps"	Steven Dean Moore	Joel H. Cohen	September 28, 2014	SABF20	8.53
After being offended by a comedy cable channel roast of him, Krusty goes to his father for advice, only to have him die before he can say whether or not he found his son funny. This causes Krusty to retire. Bart tries to inspire Krusty by showing him old shows, but it proves that Krusty was repetitive. He has a vision of his father telling him to be kinder, but acting so brings him no joy. He goes to a synagogue where he hears his father's favorite rabbi tell Krusty's joke, which makes him think his father thought he was funny. Meanwhile, fear of losing her own father causes Lisa to try to protect Homer. Although she saves him from a fatal incident, Marge and Bart tell her not to force her worries onto him. Guest stars: Kelsey Grammer as Sideshow Bob, Don Hertzfeldt as "Sampsans" characters, Maurice LaMarche as Clive Meriwether, Jackie Mason as Rabbi Krustofsky, David Hyde Pierce as himself, Jeff Ross as himself and Sarah Silverman as herself Note: The end of the episode was dedicated to Louis Castellaneta father of Dan Castellaneta.
554	2	"The Wreck of the Relationship"	Chuck Sheetz	Jeff Westbrook	October 5, 2014	SABF17	4.27
Homer is tired of Bart disrespecting him, so he attempts to parent Bart, by forcing him to eat his broccoli. This goes nowhere, so Marge signs them up for the Relation Ship to solve their problems. Bart excels at ship work and is promoted. When Homer and the ship's captain are intoxicated, Bart is forced to sail the ship through a storm. Although Homer protests, Bart eats a piece of broccoli to gain his trust, and they survive. Meanwhile, while Homer's away, Marge takes over his fantasy football team. She drafts a poorly constructed roster, but with Lisa and Patty and Selma's help, she is able to win. Guest star: Nick Offerman as Captain Bowditch
555	3	"Super Franchise Me"	Mark Kirkland	Bill Odenkirk	October 12, 2014	SABF19	7.33
After her sandwiches become popular at Springfield Elementary, Marge opens a sandwich franchise. It becomes a huge success, until the same franchise opens another store right across the street. To escape from her contract, Moe tells her to defraud the parent company. Homer pretends to be a customer and sustains an injury in the store. To prevent a lawsuit for lack of medical training, Marge is released from her contract. Note: This episode was dedicated to Jan Hooks the former voice of Manjula Nahasapeemapetilon.
556	4	"Treehouse of Horror XXV"	Matthew Faughnan	Stephanie Gillis	October 19, 2014	SABF21	7.76
In the twenty-fifth annual Simpsons Halloween special: School is Hell: Bart and Lisa find a desk carved with an Aramaic incantation that sends them to Hell – and Bart fits in at the school there.; A Clockwork Yellow: Moe leads a Clockwork Orange-style gang, but one of his droogs (Homer) falls for a woman (Marge) and gives up life as a thug.; The Others: The Simpsons are haunted by their former selves from The Tracey Ullman Show – and Homer falls for the older Marge, angering the current Marge.; Guest star: John Ratzenberger as CGI Homer Simpson
557	5	"Opposites A-Frack"	Matthew Nastuk	Valentina L. Garza	November 2, 2014	SABF22	4.22
When Patty and Selma temporarily move in, the Simpsons discover that their smoking ignites their tap water due to Mr. Burns' fracking operation. Lisa and Marge call their assemblywoman to stop him, but she also starts a relationship with him. Burns hires Homer to buy the mineral rights to every property in town, so he can resume his operation. Everyone other than Marge agrees, which angers the townsfolk and causes Burns to end his relationship with the assemblywoman. Burns restarts his fracking as revenge, but Marge's pleas to Homer cause him to use the fire from the tap water to burn down the fracking plant. Guest star: Jane Fonda as Maxine Lombard and Robert Siegel as himself
558	6	"Simpsorama"	Bob Anderson	J. Stewart Burns	November 9, 2014	SABF16	6.70
In a crossover with Futurama, when a time capsule containing a sandwich with Bart's germs in it, Milhouse's rabbit's foot, and radioactive ooze causes rabbit creatures to attack in the future, the Planet Express crew comes to present-day Springfield to stop the incident in the first place. Analysis of the creatures show that the creatures contain Bart's DNA. As the crew and the Simspons try to retrieve the capsule, the creatures attack the time portal in the future, sending everyone except Maggie and Bender to the future. There, they lure the creatures into a trap and send them into space. The Simpsons return home, and Homer puts a shut-down Bender in the basement to be retrieved in the future. Guest stars: John DiMaggio as Bender, David Herman as Scruffy, Phil LaMarr as Hermes Conrad, Maurice LaMarche as Hedonismbot, Morbo and Lrrr, Katey Sagal as Turanga Leela, Lauren Tom as Amy Wong, Frank Welker as Nibbler and Billy West as Philip J. Fry, Professor Farnsworth and Zoidberg Note: The events of this crossover episode occur between the 7th and 8th seasons of Futurama.
559	7	"Blazed and Confused"	Rob Oliver	Carolyn Omine & William Wright	November 16, 2014	TABF01	6.70
Bart plans for revenge on his new teacher, Mr. Lassen, who is a terrible bully, after Bart is humiliated. He learns that Lassen will be igniting the effigy at "Blazing Guy." Bart suggests going there for the family's camping trip, and they agree. Once there, he and Milhouse add fire retardant to the effigy. When Lassen fails to ignite the effigy, he attacks Bart and Milhouse, but they escape. Lassen is fired for his behavior and gets a new job as a prison guard where he plans revenge with Sideshow Bob. Guest stars: Willem Dafoe as Jack Lassen, Kelsey Grammer as Sideshow Bob and David Silverman as himself
560	8	"Covercraft"	Steven Dean Moore	Matt Selman	November 23, 2014	TABF02	3.45
When Homer has a midlife crisis, he forms a band of Springfield dads. Despite the band's modest early success, Apu ends up being a breakout star and joins a more successful band. Homer becomes envious and breaks up his band. Marge tells him to go to a concert to support Apu, but he sneaks backstage to try and get revenge. He hears the band denying Apu vacation time, and Apu tells Homer that he is homesick. Homer decides to poison the band to make them sick, and Homer's reunited band performs at the concert instead. Guest stars: Will Forte as King Toot and Sammy Hagar as himself
561	9	"I Won't Be Home for Christmas"	Mark Kirkland	Al Jean	December 7, 2014	TABF03	6.52
On Christmas Eve, Homer leaves work early to be with his family. He gets into a car accident and goes to Moe's to wait for repairs. Moe convinces him to stay late with him at the bar because he is lonely. When he finally returns home, Marge kicks Homer out of the house. Depressed, Homer takes a lonely walk through Springfield instead of being with his family. Moe finds Homer's wallet at the bar and goes to the Simpson house to return it. He confesses that it was his fault that Homer was late, so Marge goes to look for him. When they finally reunite, they forgive each other.
562	10	"The Man Who Came to Be Dinner"	David Silverman	Al Jean & David Mirkin	January 4, 2015	RABF15	10.62
The Simpson family attend a trip to an amusement park named Dizneeland, where they go on a ride called "Rocket to Your Doom" and accidentally end up on Rigel 7, the home planet of Kang and Kodos. Homer is selected to be eaten, but he is rescued by other Rigelians who do not believe in eating intelligent species. When the rest of the Simpsons are to be eaten, Homer returns and offers himself in exchange for them, but he is also prepared to be eaten. When a piece of Homer is eaten by the Rigelian Queen, she dies, and they discover that humans are poisonous to them. The Simpsons are sent home in a spaceship, but they decide not to go directly home after a call with Grampa.
563	11	"Bart's New Friend"	Bob Anderson	Judd Apatow	January 11, 2015	TABF05	4.28
Homer goes to a hypnotist and ends up believing he is ten years old. However, when the hypnotist, who is a criminal, escapes to avoid being arrested, Homer becomes stuck in his new age, so he bonds with Bart. When the hypnotist is caught, Homer is torn between staying young and returning to adulthood. He tells Bart to stay young and returns to adulthood. Later, Homer tells Bart that he had a special friend when he was younger but does not remember who he was. Guest star: Stacy Keach as Don Bookner
564	12	"The Musk Who Fell to Earth"	Matthew Nastuk	Neil Campbell	January 25, 2015	TABF04	3.29
Elon Musk comes to Springfield looking for inspiration. He thinks Homer has many ideas for inventions, so they become friends. Musk convinces Mr. Burns to build a new type of power plant. Later, Burns learns that the plant is losing money although Musk just wants to save the planet. For revenge, Burns fires many of the plant's employees and plans to kill Musk. Marge tells Homer to end his friendship with Musk to save his job. As he ends his relationship with Musk, he save Homer from a poorly aimed bullet meant for Musk. He then departs Springfield. Guest star: Elon Musk as himself
565	13	"Walking Big & Tall"	Chris Clements	Michael Price	February 8, 2015	TABF06	2.78
Lisa writes a new Springfield anthem after discovering the old one was plagiarized. At a theater performance for its debut, Homer becomes stuck in his seat due to his obesity. Marge tells him to join a weight control support group but ends up joining a support group that embraces obesity. The group protests unrealistic thin figures. Marge tells Homer to leave the group, but he refuses. When she says that the group's leader, Albert, is too lazy to walk, he stands up to prove Marge wrong, but immediately dies. At his funeral, Homer learns Albert was quite young, which prompts him to go on a diet. Guest star: Kevin Michael Richardson as Albert and Pharrell Williams as himself
566	14	"My Fare Lady"	Mike Frank Polcino	Marc Wilmore	February 15, 2015	TABF07	2.67
Marge becomes a chauffeur after she grows tired of chauffeuring her own kids around, but ends up disliking it due to the demands her customers make. She also earns the hate of taxi drivers. Meanwhile, Homer, Lenny, and Carl run Moe's bar while he goes to a theater show. When it gets destroyed, they give him a job at the power plant. He is successful and becomes their manager, but his management style annoys them. While Marge drives Moe to his bar, they complain to each other about their jobs, and they decide to quit. At the bar, the taxi drivers attack Marge. Moe defends her, and he reconciles with Homer, Lenny, and Carl. Guest stars: Christopher Lloyd as Jim Ignatowski and Rich Sommer as Young Man Note: This is the first episode where Bart (despite appearing in the episode) doesn't have a single line of dialogue. As a result, this leaves Homer the only Simpson family member to speak in every episode.
567	15	"The Princess Guide"	Timothy Bailey	Brian Kelley	March 1, 2015	TABF08	3.93
Homer takes Lisa to bring your daughter to work day, where she has fun watching him. A Nigerian princess named Kemi comes to Springfield, as her father intends to work out a uranium deal with Mr. Burns, and Homer is chosen to protect her due to his love for Lisa showing on the camera. Moe, having recently lost his money to a Nigerian prince, believes Kemi must be related to the scammer, but soon starts falling for her. When her father sees a photo of her kissing Moe on the internet, he ends negotiation with Burns. Kemi says the kiss was only an act of friendship, which saddens Moe. Homer tells her father to let his daughter live her life on her own terms. He agrees and signs the deal with Burns. Guest stars: Richard Branson as himself, Yaya DaCosta as Princess Kemi, Jon Lovitz as Enrico Irritazio and Kevin Michael Richardson as the Nigerian King Note: This episode was dedicated to Leonard Nimoy.
568	16	"Sky Police"	Rob Oliver	Matt Selman	March 8, 2015	TABF09	3.79
Chief Wiggum gets a jet pack, which he uses to fight crime. However, after he unintentionally crashes it into the church, Marge leads the rest of the Springfield congregation toward gambling to win money to rebuild it but does not tell Homer. They devise a system of counting cards and win enough money for the church. However, a suspicious Homer followed Marge into the casino and is held hostage in exchange for the money they won. Marge goes to the casino and prays, which is bad for business. The casino manager agrees to let Homer go, and they are banned from returning. Guest star: Nathan Fielder as Doug Blattner
569	17	"Waiting for Duffman"	Steven Dean Moore	John Frink	March 15, 2015	TABF10	3.59
When Duffman undergoes hip replacement surgery following an injury during a parade and retires, Duff Beer's owner Howard K. Duff VII sets up a reality show presented by Cat Deeley in order to find his replacement. The competition is fierce until Homer wins. Because the job requires him to stay sober during work hours, he learns that beer is not as necessary as he thought to have a good time. At an event, he gives away alcohol-free beer, but it angers the crowd. Homer is fired, which causes him to resume drinking. The previous Duffman is found and is convinced to return to his old job. Guest stars: Cat Deeley as herself, R. Lee Ermey as Col. Leslie Hapablap and Stacy Keach as Howard K. Duff VIII Note: This episode was dedicated to series executive producer Sam Simon.
570	18	"Peeping Mom"	Mark Kirkland	John Frink	April 19, 2015	TABF11	3.23
Returning home with Maggie from errands, Marge discovers that a part of Springfield is now totally destroyed. As Chief Wiggum announces that Bart could be the culprit, Bart says that he was not involved at all in the incident. This prompts Marge to follow him everywhere to force him to confess. Eventually, she gives up, but Bart reveals to Milhouse that he did it, and he plans to knock down the Springfield sign during a celebration. During the prank, he finds food that Marge gave him in his backpack, prompting him to keep the “F” and “D” up as a tribute to the fire department. He confesses his deeds to Marge. Meanwhile, Homer ignores Santa's Little Helper once again when he meets Flanders' new dog named Baz. Because she bonded with Homer, Ned tries to give him the dog, but Homer declines because he thinks Ned would be a better owner.
571	19	"The Kids Are All Fight"	Bob Anderson	Rob LaZebnik	April 26, 2015	TABF12	3.33
Homer finds an old film strip, which prompts the story of Bart and Lisa's sibling rivalry to be told. When Lisa shows she can write Bart's name better than himself, he hits her with a toy. Homer sees this, and Homer and Bart attack each other. The siblings keep fighting, prompting Ned to have his Grandma watch them, so Homer and Marge can have a break. When Grandma Flanders falls asleep, they go out and wander around Springfield. They learn to be a good team while Homer and Marge look for them. They end up at the Springfield Tire Fire where Homer rescues them.
572	20	"Let's Go Fly a Coot"	Chris Clements	Jeff Westbrook	May 3, 2015	TABF13	3.12
After Homer sees an expensive birthday, he complains about not getting the good things at his parties as a kid and ruins birthday parties all over town and is then forced to throw a party for Ned's son Rod. At Rod's party at the Air Force museum, Grampa tells the family stories about his days in the U.S. Air Force and reunites with his old friends. When Grampa's friends see how Homer treats his dad, they start forcing him to treat him right. Meanwhile, Bart begins using e-cigarettes to impress Milhouse's cousin Annika, who he has a crush on. When Annika leaves for the airport to go home, Grampa tells Bart that he performed a grand gesture to impress a waitress named Mona, Homer's mother. Bart goes to the airport, but tells her he does not like her because she complained the entire time she was in Springfield. Guest stars: Glenn Close as Mona Simpson and Carice van Houten as Annika Van Houten
573	21	"Bull-E"	Lance Kramer	Tim Long	May 10, 2015	TABF15	2.77
When Bart is bullied after a school dance, Marge gets the city to adopt a tough anti-bullying law. Although the police arrest bullies at first, the police start arresting anyone wrongly accused because it was written vaguely. When Rod and Todd claim that Homer is bullying Ned, he is arrested and sent to treatment. He realizes that Flanders is better than him and begs him for forgiveness. He kneels on Ned's lawn for a long time until he finally forgives him. Guest stars: Albert Brooks as Dr. Raufbold, Joe Mantegna as Fat Tony and Johnny Mathis as himself
574	22	"Mathlete's Feat"	Mike Frank Polcino	Michael Price	May 17, 2015	TABF16	2.82
When the school goes all-digital thanks to a donation from Springfield Elementary alumni and all of the electronics go out, Lisa suggests turning the school into a Waldorf school, where kids "learn by doing" with hands-on interactions with Lunchlady Dora and Groundskeeper Willie. Later, Willie is put in charge of the school Mathletes team after Lisa sees him put new grass in. Much to his dismay, Bart is put on the team. When the team competes against Waverly Hills Elementary, the score is tied, and Bart must solve the last problem. Using Homer's hair, Bart solves it, and Springfield Elementary wins. Guest star: Justin Roiland as Rick and Morty

== Production ==
The season was ordered to production in October 2013. Six episodes were holdovers from the previous season, and one episode was a holdover from the twenty-fourth season. Executive producer Al Jean continued his role as primary showrunner, a role he had since the thirteenth season. Executive producer Matt Selman was also the showrunner for several episodes, a role he performed since the twenty-third season.

This season featured the final episode written by Valentina L. Garza before she left for the television series Bordertown. It also features the final episode written by Marc Wilmore before leaving for the television series F Is for Family. In addition, the season featured an episode written by filmmaker Judd Apatow that he submitted as a spec script to the show in 1990.

This season featured a crossover episode featuring the characters from creator Matt Groening's television series Futurama written by J. Stewart Burns, who was a writer on that series. In addition, one hour after its season premiere, the characters of The Simpsons crossed over to the television series Family Guy for a one-hour episode showrun by former Simpsons writer Richard Appel and directed by former Simpsons animator Peter Shin.

The episode held over from the twenty-fourth season, "The Man Who Came to Be Dinner," was considered to be expanded into the next Simpsons feature film. However, Jean and executive producer James L. Brooks thought controversial nature of the plot, featuring aliens Kang and Kodos, would upset viewers, so they allowed it to air on television to reduce the magnitude of the controversy.

== Reception ==
=== Ratings ===
For the 2014–2015 television season, the season earned a 2.6 rating in the 18-49 demographic, which was the 35th best performing show. It averaged 5.62 million viewers, which was the 100th best performing show.

=== Critical response ===
Matthew Poland of Slant Magazine gave the first three episodes of the season a 2.5 out of 4 stars. He thought that the series had settled to the point where viewers expect what they are getting, and the focus is now on the jokes and the couch gags, where more experimentation can occur.

Gonzo Green of Bubbleblabber gave the season a 7.5 out of 10. Green highlighted the episodes at the beginning of the season as well as the holiday episodes and the Futurama crossover. Green also felt there were episodes that were terrible as well as some that had recycled plots.

In 2025, Lisa Laman of ComicBook.com referred to season 26, alongside season 18, as the creative nadir of the show's entire run, albeit with one or two artistic highs still sneaking in.

=== Awards and nominations ===
At the 67th Primetime Creative Arts Emmy Awards, actor Hank Azaria won for Outstanding Character Voice-Over Performance for his work in "The Princess Guide." Actors Dan Castellaneta and Tress MacNeille were also nominated in this category. The episode "Treehouse of Horror XXV" was nominated for Outstanding Animated Program. Re-Recording mixers Tara Paul and Mark Linden were nominated for Outstanding Sound Mixing for their work in "Simpsorama."

Writers Matt Selman and Michael Price were nominated for the Writers Guild of America Award for Television: Animation for episodes written this season.

Writer and executive producer Al Jean was nominated for an Annie Award for Outstanding Achievement for Writing in an Animated Television/Broadcast Production for his script for "I Won't Be Home for Christmas."
