= The Princess Guide (The Simpsons) =

- The Simpsons episode
- Episode no.: Season 26; Episode 15
- Directed by: Timothy Bailey
- Written by: Brian Kelley
- Production code: TABF08
- Original air date: March 1, 2015

Guest appearances
- Richard Branson as himself; Yaya DaCosta as Princess Kemi; Jon Lovitz as Enrico Irritazio; Kevin Michael Richardson as the Nigerian King

Episode features
- Couch gag: The printer gets jammed while printing out the couch gag. A "Paper Jam" error appears, prompting the printed Homer to mutter "Mmmm. Paper Jam."

Episode chronology
← Previous "My Fare Lady"	Next → "Sky Police"
- The Simpsons season 26

"The Princess Guide" is the fifteenth episode of the twenty-sixth season of the American animated television series The Simpsons, and the 567th overall episode of the series. The episode was directed by Timothy Bailey and written by Brian Kelley. It originally aired on the Fox network in the United States on March 1, 2015.

In this episode, Moe falls in love with a Nigerian princess while Mr. Burns negotiates a uranium deal with her father. Yaya DaCosta, Jon Lovitz, and Kevin Michael Richardson guest starred. Businessman Richard Branson appeared as himself. The episode received positive reviews. Hank Azaria won an Emmy Award for his performance in this episode.

The episode was dedicated to the memory of Leonard Nimoy, who died two days before the episode aired. Nimoy guest-starred in two Simpsons episodes, "Marge vs. the Monorail" and "The Springfield Files".

== Plot ==
Homer takes Lisa to a "Take Your Daughter to Work Day" at the power plant. When Homer manages to trade a corn chip for a full salad for Lisa, they hug. Meanwhile, Mr. Burns needs uranium immediately to keep the plant running after Elon Musk's actions caused severe financial trouble, and meets a King of Nigeria to negotiate. When the king mentions that his daughter Princess Kemi is staying in the country and needs someone to care for her, Burns sees Lisa and Homer hugging on his surveillance monitors and tasks Homer to supervise Kemi. However, Homer does poorly at his job, as the princess becomes bored in her apartment. When he takes Kemi to Moe's, Moe expresses displeasure since he suspects the princess' brother stole money from him.

Homer returns to the apartment with the princess, who disappears. As he tries to explain the situation to Chief Wiggum, he gets arrested moments before she gets back to the bar, where Moe finds himself bonding with Kemi. They spend the next day together seeing Springfield and having fun until Homer, having been bailed out by Lenny and Carl, finds them, angry that Moe has taken his job to care for the princess. Moe and Kemi evade Homer and when she gives him a kiss, a paparazzo takes the picture which is quickly viewed by her father on the Internet, leading him to declaring he will never sign the uranium deal with Burns. Kemi explains to her father that kiss was just friendly, which hurts Moe until she declares that Moe is a wonderful friend who made her happy. Homer dissuades the king from punishing her and urges him to let his daughter live her life as she wants, and the king relents and signs the deal.

== Production ==
Richard Branson voiced himself in this episode as Mr. Burns' neighbor. He was previously drawn in a non-speaking appearance in the twenty-second season episode "Loan-a Lisa."

== Cultural references ==
The title of the episode is a reference to the 1987 film, The Princess Bride.

Moe recites a parody of Goodnight Moon when going to sleep. Kemi leaves Moe with the Nigerian books, Things Fall Apart and Home And Exile by Chinua Achebe, The Famished Road by Ben Okri and The Thing Around Your Neck by Chimamanda Ngozi Adichie.

== Reception ==
=== Viewing figures ===
The episode received a 1.8 rating and was watched by a total of 3.93 million people, making it the second most watched show on Fox that night, behind the series premiere of The Last Man on Earth.

=== Critical response ===
Dennis Perkins of The A.V. Club gave the episode an A−, saying "Resting the show on Moe’s shoulders has been done before, sure—but never in so gracefully funny a manner as this. While never sacrificing Moe’s inherent and necessary misanthropy and general creepiness, the episode nonetheless builds a refreshingly warm and funny story around him. Honestly, it’s the best episode of season 26 so far."

Tony Sokol of Den of Geek gave this episode 4 out of 5 stars. He called it a solid episode and highlighted the sight gags and jokes.

Furthermore, Bakwa did a two-part series on The Simpsons, wherein, bloggers, writers, cultural thinkers and academics were asked to comment on the episode. Most of the reactions highlighted poor research, one-dimensional characters, the challenge of portraying believable Nigerians, and the episode’s relatable character, Princess Kemi.

=== Awards and nominations ===
Hank Azaria won the Award for Outstanding Character Voice-Over Performance at the 67th Primetime Creative Arts Emmy Awards for his roles in the episode as Moe and the Pedicab driver. He was one of three The Simpsons actors to be nominated.
