= My Fare Lady =

- The Simpsons episode
- Episode no.: Season 26; Episode 14
- Directed by: Mike Frank Polcino
- Written by: Marc Wilmore
- Production code: TABF07
- Original air date: February 15, 2015

Guest appearances
- Christopher Lloyd as Jim Ignatowski; Rich Sommer as Young Man

Episode features
- Chalkboard gag: "Pixel art is not real art"
- Couch gag: A pixelated version of the opening sequence by Paul Robertson.

Episode chronology
← Previous "Walking Big & Tall"	Next → "The Princess Guide"
- The Simpsons season 26

"My Fare Lady" is the fourteenth episode of the twenty-sixth season of the American animated television series The Simpsons, and the 566th overall episode of the series. The episode was directed by Mike Frank Polcino and written by Marc Wilmore. It originally aired on the Fox network in the United States on February 15, 2015.

In this episode, Marge becomes a driver for hire while Moe becomes a manager at the power plant when Homer and his friends destroy his bar. Christopher Lloyd and Rich Sommer guest starred. The episode received positive reviews.

It is the first episode where Bart has no dialogue even though he appears. He did not appear at all in the earlier episode "Four Great Women and a Manicure".

== Plot ==
After a parody of The Jetsons as a dream, Homer is awakened by Marge to drive the children to all their activities. In order to avoid the task, Homer escapes to Moe's tavern to pretend he is too drunk to drive, forcing Marge to drive the kids herself. At the bar, Moe tells Homer, Lenny, and Carl that he received tickets from Sideshow Mel to a Laney Fontaine theater show. The guys encourage Moe to go, though he is worried about the safety of the bar while he is gone. To this, Homer agrees to act as bartender in Moe's place for the night. Homer, Lenny and Carl hold a ladies' night to attract more customers to the bar, but the scheme backfires as the women trash the bar before Moe returns with Laney, who leaves upon seeing the mess. The guys apologize to Moe by offering him a job at the Nuclear Power Plant. Mr. Burns offers Moe a job as the janitor, though soon promotes him to supervisor of Sector 7G after he prevents the NRC from trying to shut down the plant. Moe soon angers Homer and the guys when he acts like a "jerk" to them as part of his job, including demoting Homer to Burns' personal gardener for causing Elon Musk to inflict financial ruin on the plant, leading the three to disown him as their friend.

After driving the kids to their activities, Marge comes across a driver for a vehicle for hire company who encourages her to join. Marge quickly agrees hoping to use the earnings to buy an ice maker for the kitchen fridge, though also quickly acquires boredom from driving Springfield residents (such as Nelson Muntz, Groundskeeper Willie, Lenny, Dr. Nick, Gil Gunderson, etc.) and hatred from rival taxi drivers. In addition, when Homer massages her after a rough day, she accidentally offends him by mentioning that his gardening has brought out his feminine side, leading to her and Moe complaining to each other about their problems whilst driving Moe to his tavern. Once they arrive at the bar, the two both agree to quit their bad jobs. The taxi drivers attempt to kill Marge only to be stopped by Moe who threatens to kill them all with the shotgun he keeps behind the bar. In gratitude for saving her life, Marge gifts her company's smile decoration to Moe, who hangs it in the mirror of his newly-repaired bar and reconciles with his friends.

== Production ==
The opening sequence, including the chalkboard and couch gags, was originally a video created by Australian animators Paul Robertson and Ivan Dixon with music by Jeremy Dower. After uploading the video to YouTube on February 1, 2015, producers contacted them within one day to license the video. On February 10, executive producer Al Jean announced that the video would appear at the beginning of this episode.

Christopher Lloyd reprised his Taxi character Jim Ignatowski in this episode as the person who rallies the cabbies against Marge. Executive producer James L. Brooks was also an executive producer on Taxi.

== Cultural references ==
The opening sequence is a reference to Illusion of Gaia, a game on the Super Nintendo. After the opening sequence, there is another one that parodies the opening of The Jetsons. A parody of the song "Taxi" by Harry Chapin plays when Marge drives Moe.

== Reception ==
=== Viewing figures ===
The episode received an audience of 2.67 million, making it the most watched show on Fox that night.

=== Critical response ===
Dennis Perkins of The A.V. Club gave the episode a B, saying "Performance goes a long way on The Simpsons, the cast's quarter-century relationship with their characters helping them flesh out a performance with shades no other show can call upon. 'My Fare Lady,' while as unfocused as many later episodes and based partly around a forgettable pop fad, is nonetheless entertaining thanks largely to Hank Azaria's performance as everyone's favorite least-favorite barkeep, Moe."

Tony Sokol of Den of Geek gave this episode 3 out of 5 stars. He felt the episode was not groundbreaking, but praised the jokes, especially the one with Burns asking for a dollar amount to profit to lose his soul.

=== Awards and nominations ===
Tress MacNeille's role in the episode was nominated for the Award for Outstanding Character Voice-Over Performance at the 67th Primetime Creative Arts Emmy Awards, one of three Simpsons actors to be nominated. It was her first nomination in the category.
