= The Simpsons Guy =

- Family Guy episode
- Promotional image of the episode featuring the Griffin family imitating the couch gag
- Episode no.: Season 13; Episode 1
- Directed by: Peter Shin
- Written by: Patrick Meighan
- Production code: BACX22/BACX23
- Original air date: September 28, 2014

Guest appearances
- Dan Castellaneta as Homer Simpson, Santa's Little Helper, Abraham Simpson, Barney Gumble, Krusty the Clown, Squeaky-Voiced Teen, Hans Moleman, Kodos, Mayor Quimby, Lenny Leonard, Groundskeeper Willie, Sideshow Mel, and Blue-Haired Lawyer; Julie Kavner as Marge Simpson, and Patty and Selma; Nancy Cartwright as Bart Simpson, Maggie Simpson, Nelson Muntz, Ralph Wiggum, and Todd Flanders; Yeardley Smith as Lisa Simpson; Hank Azaria as Moe Szyslak, Apu Nahasapeemapetilon, Carl Carlson, Chief Wiggum, Comic Book Guy, Lou, Sea Captian, Professor Frink, and Dr. Nick Riviera; H. Jon Benjamin as Bob Belcher; Jeff Bergman as Fred Flintstone; Julie Bowen as Claire Dunphy; James Woods as himself

Episode chronology
← Previous "Chap Stewie"	Next → "The Book of Joe"
- Family Guy season 13

"The Simpsons Guy" is the one-hour-long season premiere of the thirteenth season of the American adult animated television series Family Guy, and the 232nd overall episode. It is a 44-minute-long crossover with The Simpsons, and was written by Patrick Meighan and directed by Peter Shin. It first premiered in the United States on Fox on September 28, 2014, where both The Simpsons and Family Guy have been aired on Fox since their respective premieres on Fox in both 1989 and 1999, respectively.

In this episode, the Griffins meet the Simpsons and decide to stay with them after the Griffins' car is stolen just outside Springfield. After the Griffins get their car back, Peter and Homer are taken to court as a representative of the Pawtucket Patriot Brewery, his employer, when it is discovered that its ale is an unauthorized copy of Duff Beer.

The idea of a crossover episode was suggested by Family Guy executive producer and former The Simpsons writer Richard Appel, and this episode was first announced by Fox on July 18, 2013. Five of the six main members of the voice cast of The Simpsons—with the exception of Harry Shearer—voiced their respective characters in this episode. "The Simpsons Guy" received mixed reviews from critics, who had differing opinions on how well both shows combined.

== Plot ==
Peter creates a comic for the Quahog newspaper, but its misogynistic humor angers local women. When an attempt calming them fails, the Griffins flee Quahog escaping the angry townspeople. Their car is stolen at a gas station, leaving them stranded outside Springfield. At the Kwik-E-Mart, Homer Simpson introduces himself and takes them to the Springfield Police Department, where they are turned away by Chief Wiggum.

The Simpsons put up the Griffins in their house. Bart shows Stewie his slingshot, teaches him how to skateboard, and prank calls Moe, and the two become friends. When Nelson Muntz bullies Bart, Stewie kidnaps and tortures Nelson, initially without Bart knowing. Lisa tries finding Meg's talent. When Lisa realizes Meg is a natural at the saxophone, she becomes jealous. Chris and Brian take Santa's Little Helper for a walk. Brian tries teaching Santa's Little Helper independence, but he runs away. Lois and Marge notice that Santa's Little Helper is missing, so Chris and Brian fake his appearance until he returns. Peter and Homer unsuccessfully try finding Peter's car, discovering it in the possession of Hans Moleman when he accidentally runs Peter over.

The men celebrate at Moe's Tavern, but their relationships sour when Peter introduces Homer to Pawtucket Patriot Ale. The drink is revealed to be an imitation of Duff Beer with a new label. Duff, represented by the Blue Haired Lawyer, files a lawsuit against Pawtucket Brewery for patent infringement, with Peter forced to defend the brewery in court, in front of similar characters from both shows and presiding judge Fred Flintstone rescuing Quahog. Despite declaring that both Pawtucket Patriot Ale and Duff Beer are imitations of Bud Rock, Fred rules in favor of Duff.

The Griffins prepare to return to Quahog, where Peter faces the prospect of finding a new job. Lisa gives Meg her saxophone, but Peter throws it away, claiming there's no room for more luggage. Stewie points out that he took revenge on all of Bart's enemies: Nelson, Jimbo Jones, Principal Skinner, Sideshow Bob, and, for the sake of making a scatological pun, Apu. Shocked by Stewie's violent tendencies, Bart ends their friendship. Homer tries explaining his actions, but Peter reacts angrily and the two start an intense fight that gradually reaches larger proportions, with the two falling into nuclear waste at the Springfield Nuclear Power Plant and temporarily becoming mutants with superpowers; they then go into space, where they end up in Kang and Kodos' flying saucer before returning to Earth. After the intense fight ends inconclusively, with the two fathers severely harmed, they admit their admiration for each other while agreeing to keep their distance in the future. Returning home, the Griffins find the heat from Peter's comic has died down, and the Pawtucket Brewery is safe; Lois doubts that the inhabitants of Springfield will visit Quahog to enforce the ruling. Stewie pretends he is over Bart, but ends up writing "I will not think about Bart anymore" several times on a chalkboard in his room.

== Production ==
=== Development ===
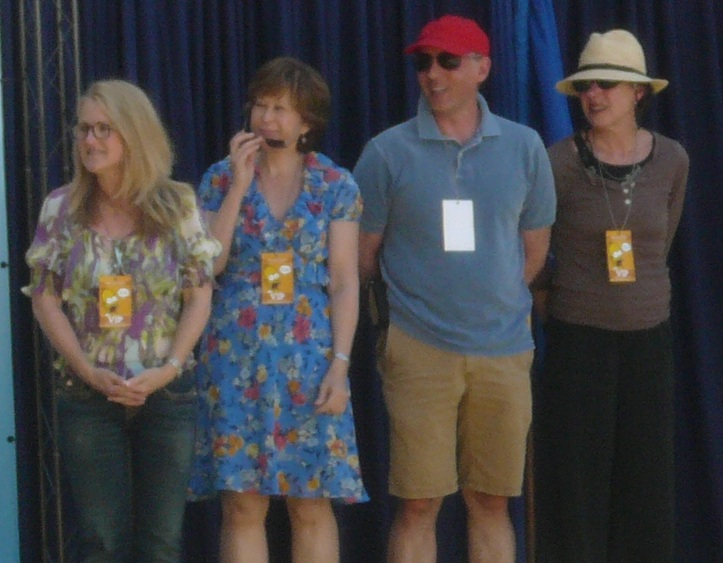
Five of the six main voice actors from The Simpsons reprised their roles in this episode. From left to right: Nancy Cartwright, Yeardley Smith, Dan Castellaneta and Julie Kavner. Hank Azaria and Harry Shearer (the latter of which did not participate) are not pictured.

The idea of a crossover episode with The Simpsons was first suggested while the thirteenth season of Family Guy was being planned out. Executive producer Richard Appel received Family Guy creator Seth MacFarlane's approval and input after brainstorming ideas. Appel then asked for permission from Simpsons executive producers Matt Groening, James L. Brooks and Al Jean to use their characters. This was approved; Appel was previously a writer-producer on The Simpsons for four seasons, and retained his former colleagues' trust. Dan Castellaneta, Julie Kavner, Nancy Cartwright, Yeardley Smith, and Hank Azaria guest star as their Simpsons characters, but Harry Shearer, the final main cast member of The Simpsons, was unavailable due to scheduling conflicts. When asked about how he felt about the crossover, Shearer replied, "Matter and anti-matter."

Family Guy writers pitched several storylines for the crossover, including one in which the Griffins stay with Lenny and Carl and never meet the Simpsons, and another one in which their whole series is revealed to be a figment of Ralph Wiggum's imagination. When the final script was read to the show's staff, Appel expressed his concern about the length of the episode. MacFarlane said that Fox would be happy to make it an hour long. Supervising director Peter Shin, a former layout artist on The Simpsons, spent time adjusting the Griffins to the specifications of Springfield—changes included dimming the whites of their eyeballs so they would not look too bright—and animating the eight-minute fight between Peter and Homer. Appel said there are no plans to do a sequel to the episode, but stated that "by season 43 of The Simpsons and season 27 of Family Guy, someone who's looking at a blank board is going to say, 'Well, the Griffins went to Springfield... what if the Simpsons went to Quahog?' And more heads will explode at Fox."

=== Announcement and promotion ===
This episode was first announced by Fox on July 18, 2013 to premiere in the fall of 2014. In May 2014, the network presented two clips from the episode at their annual upfront presentation. In an interview with Entertainment Weekly about the episode, MacFarlane stated that the key to a good crossover episode is "really about the character interaction. People want to see Peter interact with Homer. They want to see Bart interact with Stewie. In a way, the story in a crossover episode, while it has to be there, is never quite as important as how the characters interact with each other." The Simpsons creator Groening added, "In this case, it's two really vivid shows and seeing what they can do together. You want to see them having a good time and you want to see Peter and Homer duke it out".

"The Simpsons Guy" includes cameo appearances by Roger of American Dad!, Bob Belcher of Bob's Burgers, and Fred Flintstone of The Flintstones. The episode also pokes fun at the different characters' skin colors; upon entering Springfield, Peter warns the family not to drink the water because all the citizens appear to have hepatitis, while Homer refers to the Griffin family as "our albino visitors". The Springfield Gorge scene in Homer and Peter's fight sequence is a reference to the finale of the season two episode "Bart the Daredevil" in which Homer inadvertently ends up jumping the Gorge on Bart's skateboard.

== Reception ==
=== Ratings ===
The episode was watched by 8.45 million viewers in its original American broadcast, earning a 4.5 rating/12% share in the 18–49 demographics. This was slightly more than the second season premiere of Resurrection on ABC but less than The Good Wife on CBS, both shows in the same timeslot. "Clown in the Dumps", the earlier premiere of the twenty-sixth season of The Simpsons, was watched by 8.53 million and received a 3.9 rating/11% share in the 18–49 demographics.

=== Critical reception ===
"The Simpsons Guy" received mixed reviews. Writing in USA Today, Mike Foss gave the episode a positive review, but criticized how the episode was written by Family Guy staff and thus lacked elements of The Simpsons' humor. Jason Hughes of TheWrap was also generally in praise of the episode, but felt that certain scenes—including both Peter and Homer's fight and an erotic car wash sequence—were "squeamish" and out of place for The Simpsons. He, however, acknowledged that Bart's disgust at Stewie's behavior was "a good statement" of the difference between the two shows. Positive reviews of the crossover also came from IGN, the International Business Times, the Standard-Examiner, and TVLine.

Other critics responded negatively. Scott Meslow, of The Week, pointed out his disappointment that the episode parodied a scene in "Bart the Daredevil", as that episode dealt with Homer and Bart's relationship, but "The Simpsons Guy" used it as a joke in a violent sequence. Emily VanDerWerff wrote on Vox that while she expected the episode to be mediocre, it actually ended up a "blight on humanity itself". She listed nine reasons for this statement, including her dissatisfaction with the car wash and fight scenes, and the use of sexist jokes which had lost their shock value. After the episode aired in the United Kingdom in July 2015, Ellen E. Jones, of The Independent, criticized the episode's rape jokes and violence, and theorized that with the poor box-office performance of his latest film Ted 2, audiences were growing tired of MacFarlane's humor. Ed Power of The Daily Telegraph, however, wrote that Family Guy's usual objectionable content was restrained in the episode, as if it had been "infected" by recent seasons of The Simpsons.

The A.V. Club named the episode among "The worst TV of 2014" under "Worst crossover", writing that "for no real reason, Homer and Peter find themselves in an interminable 'sexy car wash' montage, sudsing and squirting each other in tied-off tees and denim cutoffs. Family Guy prides itself on cutaway gags, but the car-wash scene... is its most successful look-away gag".

== See also ==
- Night of the Hurricane – a crossover of all of Seth MacFarlane's programs on Fox.
- Simpsorama – a crossover of The Simpsons and Futurama.
- List of The Simpsons episodes
