= Covercraft =

- The Simpsons episode
- Episode no.: Season 26; Episode 8
- Directed by: Steven Dean Moore
- Written by: Matt Selman
- Production code: TABF02
- Original air date: November 23, 2014

Guest appearances
- Will Forte as King Toot; Sammy Hagar as himself

Episode features
- Couch gag: The Simpsons play with their smartphones as they walk in, but they do not pay attention to where they are going and bump into each other and fall over. They pick up their smartphones and carry on playing.

Episode chronology
| ← Previous "Blazed and Confused" | Next → "I Won't Be Home for Christmas" |
- The Simpsons season 26

"Covercraft" is the eighth episode in the twenty-sixth season of the American animated television series The Simpsons, and the 560th episode of the series overall. The episode was directed by Steven Dean Moore and written by Matt Selman. It first aired on the Fox network in the United States on November 23, 2014.

In this episode, Homer forms a band with other dads until Apu becomes a star and joins a more successful band. Will Forte guest starred as King Toot, and musician Sammy Hagar appeared as himself. The episode received negative reviews.

== Plot ==
Moe and the owner of King Toot's have a fight and are arrested, forcing their businesses to be closed down. Because of this, Homer and Lisa have to buy a saxophone reed from a retail music store. Whilst there, Homer buys a bass guitar and he plays it wherever he is. Annoyed, Marge meets up with other wives in town who also have been annoyed by their husbands' constant playing. They decide to have their husbands form a garage band so they will not always have to listen to their music. Homer gathers Reverend Lovejoy on guitars, Kirk Van Houten on keyboards, and Dr. Hibbert on drums. Apu later joins as the lead singer when they hear him sing "Hopin' for a Dream", a song by the (fictitious) 1980s glam metal band, Sungazer. They call their band Covercraft and start playing shows. At a gig at the Cabbage Festival, Apu admits to Homer that he has stage fright, but Homer suggests that he picture himself alone at the Kwik-E-Mart to cope. The gig is ultimately successful, the band gains recognition and Sungazer sees the video and asks Apu to replace their dead lead singer.

When Homer first sees the success Apu has gotten, he is happy to announce that his friend is becoming rich and successful, until Kirk mentions his jealousy and Apu points out that Sungazer are playing in Las Vegas. When Lisa calls out his jealousy, Homer corrects her, stating he is envious, not jealous, because he wants what someone else has, whereas being jealous is being afraid someone will take what you already have. Lisa quickly looks it up in a dictionary and realizes he is right. Without their lead vocalist, Covercraft's rehearsal sessions grind to a halt when Kirk volunteers to replace Apu and Homer criticizes his vocal abilities. When the others tell Homer to calm down, he angrily breaks up the band.

Marge reminds Homer that he did not start the band to become rich and famous, and encourages him to go to Sungazer's concert in Springfield Costington's arena to show his support for Apu. At the concert, Homer uses a backstage pass to sneak into Apu's dressing room and steal his special Apu shirt, but then overhears the band denying Apu vacation time to spend with his family and mentioning his contract instead. Apu sees Homer and admits that he feels lonely and homesick. Homer decides to take revenge on Sungazer by having Sanjay poison them with Kwik-E-Mart hot dogs. Apu brings out the reunited Covercraft to perform until Homer and Apu are arrested by Chief Wiggum for food poisoning. Sungazer's concert subsequently falters while Sanjay mingles with the groupies.

During the end credits, Homer, Apu, Moe, the owner of King Toot’s, and Sammy Hagar are shown sitting in a jail cell until Hagar reveals he has a plan to get them all out of there.

== Production ==
In June 2014, writer and executive producer Matt Selman announced that Will Forte was cast as King Toot, whose business is next door to Moe's Tavern. It was later announced that Sammy Hagar would appear as himself.

This episode was originally titled "Band of Dads". Musician Matthew Sweet contributed to this episode's score and wrote a new song. Selman stated that the band Genesis would not license their song "Invisible Touch" for the episode because they did not approve of the episode comparing singers Peter Gabriel and Phil Collins.

== Cultural references ==
Homer describes to Lisa how the Quebec Nordiques became the Colorado Avalanche.

== Reception ==
=== Viewing figures ===
The episode received an audience of 3.45 million, making it the most watched show on Fox that night.

=== Critical response ===
Myles McNutt of The A.V. Club gave the episode a B−. He stated that the episode compared poorly with past episodes where the characters were singers because previous stories used the music to enhance the characters.

Tony Sokol of Den of Geek gave the episode 2.5 out of 5 stars. He highlighted the jokes but felt it was a missed opportunity to reference previous episodes where the characters were musicians.

=== Awards and nominations ===
Matt Selman was nominated for a Writers Guild of America Award for Outstanding Writing in Animation at the 67th Writers Guild of America Awards for his script to this episode.
