= Opposites A-Frack =

- The Simpsons episode
- Episode no.: Season 26; Episode 5
- Directed by: Matthew Nastuk
- Written by: Valentina L. Garza
- Production code: SABF22
- Original air date: November 2, 2014

Guest appearances
- Jane Fonda as Maxine Lombard; Robert Siegel as himself

Episode chronology
← Previous "Treehouse of Horror XXV"	Next → "Simpsorama"
- The Simpsons season 26

"Opposites A-Frack" is the fifth episode in the twenty-sixth season of the American animated television series The Simpsons, and the 557th episode of the series overall. The episode was directed by Matthew Nastuk and written by Valentina L. Garza. It first aired on the Fox network in the United States on November 2, 2014.

In this episode, Mr. Burns hires Homer to get the mineral rights from the town residents when the local assemblywoman stops his fracking operation while she also starts a relationship with him. Jane Fonda guest starred as Maxine Lombard. The episode received positive reviews.

== Plot ==
When Patty and Selma are forced out of their apartment while it is being fumigated, they invite themselves over to stay in the Simpson home, much to Homer's anger. The twins light up cigarettes, causing Bart and Lisa to cough severely. Homer makes a deal: if they smoke at all during their uninvited stay, Patty and Selma must leave right away. Homer installs smoke alarms all over the house to ensure this. Bad weather stops them from smoking outside, and after an unsuccessful attempt with e-cigarettes, which are legal and do not set off the smoke alarms, the twins go into a downstairs bathroom to smoke, seeing as Homer forgot to put a smoke alarm there, but they catch fire from the tap water. A gleeful Homer wastes no time kicking them out and dropping them off at a Dog Track, which they immediately take delight in due to the surrounding patrons' chain-smoking. Lisa informs Marge that the inflamed tap water is possibly a result of fracking, which she discovers that Mr. Burns is operating. She successfully calls on Democratic Assemblywoman Maxine Lombard to stop the fracking.

Burns is furious at Lombard and storms into her office, but the two end up having sex and vow to continue their romance despite their political differences. On learning that he must obtain the mineral rights to all land in Springfield in order to resume his fracking operation, Burns gives Homer the job of marketing it to the citizens of Springfield. At a Town Hall meeting, Professor Frink warns about water contamination, but Homer promises $5,000 to every person who gives their mineral rights to Burns. When he is about to resume the operation, Burns discovers that Marge did not give permission to him, and thus the project is abandoned, infuriating many residents who were looking forward to the money. Knowing that he will lose his new job, Homer is angry at Marge, and Burns breaks up with Lombard.

Lombard takes revenge on Burns, demolishing his mansion to use the land for various liberal causes, including Robert Siegel's National Public Radio. Burns plans an even bigger vengeance, and resumes his hydraulic fracturing at maximum power, causing earthquakes in the city. Marge pleads with Homer to shut it down, and he lights the inflammable water to burn the fracking plant down. On seeing that Homer and Marge can reconcile despite their differences due to their passion, Burns and Lombard get back together.

During the credits, Burns and Lombard are seen having a conversation while lying in bed with their tablet computers.

== Production ==
Jane Fonda guest starred as Maxine Lombard, a lawmaker with whom Mr. Burns has an affair. Fonda had never performed voice-over or animation work before, and executive producer Matt Selman said she understood her character and welcomed direction for her performance.

== Cultural references ==
Mr. Burns says to Maxine Lombard that she was the best woman he had ever been with, including Nellie Taft, the wife of President William Howard Taft. The episode "Homer the Smithers" had previously revealed that Burns' mother had an affair with President Taft himself.

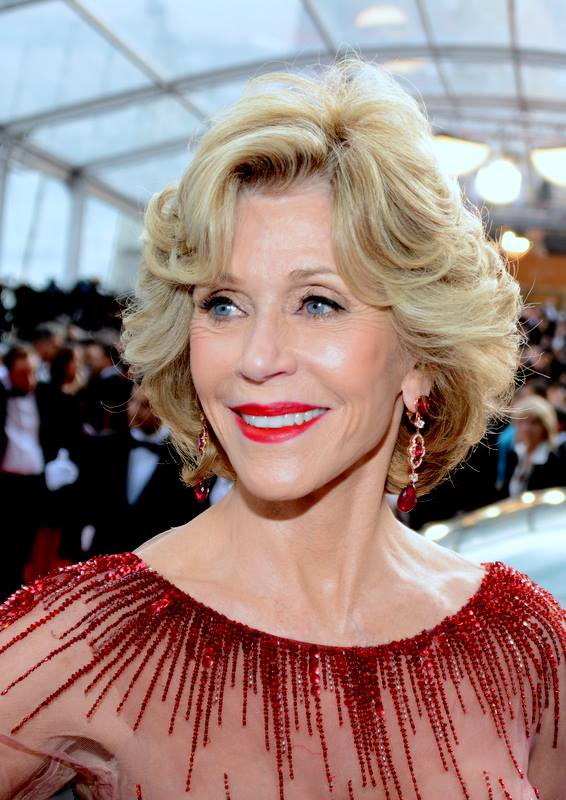
The episode was Jane Fonda's first voice-over work.

== Reception ==
The episode received an audience of 4.22 million, making it the most watched show on Fox that night.

Dennis Perkins of The A.V. Club gave the episode a B−, saying that Homer working for Burns and then sabotaging his operation was part of his "basic humanity". He referred to the ending with Burns and Lombard as having a "chilling sadness", and stated that Fonda's voiceover was too similar to The Simpsons regular Tress MacNeille. Although admitting that the episode followed what he saw as the series' usual liberal bias, he said that there were enough jokes at Lombard's agenda too, highlighting how she wanted a photograph of a baby next to the burning water.

Tony Sokol of Den of Geek gave the episode 4 out of 5 stars. He stated that it was a good episode for the season, and it would cause some debate.

The episode won an Environmental Media Award for Television Episodic Comedy.
