= Sky Police =

- The Simpsons episode
- Episode no.: Season 26; Episode 16
- Directed by: Rob Oliver
- Written by: Matt Selman
- Production code: TABF09
- Original air date: March 8, 2015

Guest appearance
- Nathan Fielder as Doug Blattner

Episode features
- Commentary: Matt Selman, Rob Oliver, David Silverman, and Michael Price

Episode chronology
← Previous "The Princess Guide"	Next → "Waiting for Duffman"
- The Simpsons season 26

"Sky Police" is the sixteenth episode of the twenty-sixth season of the American animated television series The Simpsons, and the 568th overall episode of the series. The episode was directed by Rob Oliver and written by Matt Selman. It first aired on the Fox network in the United States on March 8, 2015.

In this episode, Marge leads churchgoers to a casino to win enough money to rebuild the church after Chief Wiggum destroys it when using a jet pack. Nathan Fielder guest starred as Doug Blattner. The episode received mixed reviews, with positive reception noted for its clever cultural references but criticism for underusing certain character histories.

== Plot ==
Chief Wiggum is mistakenly delivered a military jet pack, which he gleefully accepts. He is later found by a military general who originally bought the jet pack, and received his order for an off-brand dust ruffle. Wiggum tries to escape, but is shot down by the general's soldiers. The jet pack goes off course and crashes into the church, causing massive damage. Because Reverend Lovejoy did not get an insurance plan that covers "acts of God" (or, as the adjuster clarifies, "acts of cops with jet packs"), the company gleefully denies his claim and the building is left unusable.

Desperate for funds, the congregation, led by Marge, must resort to gambling and counting cards, taught by Apu, in order to collect money to pay for the repairs. Marge then secretly proceeds to go to the casino with Sideshow Mel, Ned Flanders, Agnes Skinner, Lovejoy and his wife Helen. They win enough money for the church but Homer finds out and goes looking for Marge at the casino. The casino then holds Homer hostage in exchange for the return of the money won, but the church already gave it to the contractor, who refuses to give it back.

Marge prays in the middle of the casino which attracts a huge crowd. Having data that shows the prayer is a "disturbance" that is hurting business, the manager releases Homer and allows Marge to keep the money won for the church in exchange for her group never returning. Homer then demands that the casino stop treating people who count cards as cheaters when all they are doing is playing by the rules, so a robot picks him up and throws him into the street. Homer and Marge then enjoy a lovely sunset in front of their fully restored house of worship with a new stained-glass window depicting the card-counting team in saintly robes.

== Cultural references ==
Chief Wiggum's song "Sky Police" is a parody of "Baby Face" as sung by Julie Andrews in the musical Thoroughly Modern Millie.

The main plot of the episode is a homage to The Church Team, a team of Christian blackjack card counters active from 2005 to 2011. The episode also references the film 21, in which a Massachusetts Institute of Technology (MIT) graduate is recruited to a card-counting ring by his college tutor and gambles in order to raise tuition fees; in a similar way, Apu reveals he attended an "MIT" twice - first the Mumbai Institute of Tantric-Sex, where he was recruited by a card-counting ring and earned enough money to buy fake SAT scores to get into the real Massachusetts Institute of Technology; there, he failed every class and was kicked out and therefore had to move to Springfield.

When Gil denies the insurance claim, he says the people in head office will be doing the Saluki Strut and says, "Go Southern Illinois!" Earlier in the season in the episode "Super Franchise Me", Gil mentions he was two credits short of graduating from that university. When asked, a spokesperson for Southern Illinois University stated that the Saluki Strut does not exist. Actor Bob Odenkirk, the brother of Simpsons producer and writer Bill Odenkirk, attended Southern Illinois.

The casino montage scenes are a parody of the casino montages in the 2000s Ocean's films, with betting values flashing up on-screen and a music theme that echoes David Holmes' soundtracks for the Ocean's films.

== Reception ==
=== Viewing figures ===
The episode received a 1.6 rating and was watched by a total of 3.79 million people, making it the third most watched show on Fox that night after Family Guy and The Last Man on Earth. This viewership placed the episode slightly above the season's average.

=== Critical response ===
Dennis Perkins of The A.V. Club gave the episode a C+. He highlighted the casino plot but pointed out that the episode ignores Marge's history with gambling addiction. Perkins noted that the episode includes several inventive visual touches, yet the narrative cohesion was uneven, and the script occasionally shifted tone in ways that undercuts emotional stakes.

Tony Sokol of Den of Geek gave the episode 3 out of 5 stars. He stated there were some good lines but no major laughs or visual gags.

Stacy Glanzman of TV Fanatic gave the episode 3.3 out of 5 stars. Glanzman also pointed out the issue of Marge's gambling problem and thought there could have been a full episode with Chief Wiggum and the jet pack. Glanzman noted that the episode's mix of action and satire created an entertaining but fragmented viewing experience.

=== Awards and nominations ===
Matt Selman was nominated for a Writers Guild of America Award for Outstanding Writing in Animation at the 68th Writers Guild of America Awards for his script to this episode, competing against episodes of BoJack Horseman, The Simpsons "Barthood", and others, but the episode did not win.
