= Simpsorama =

- The Simpsons episode
- Episode no.: Season 26; Episode 6
- Directed by: Bob Anderson
- Written by: J. Stewart Burns
- Production code: SABF16
- Original air date: November 9, 2014

Guest appearances
- John DiMaggio as Bender; David Herman as Scruffy the Janitor; Maurice LaMarche as Morbo, Hedonismbot and Lrrr; Phil LaMarr as Hermes; Katey Sagal as Leela; Lauren Tom as Amy Wong; Frank Welker as Nibbler; Billy West as Philip J. Fry, Professor Farnsworth and Zoidberg

Episode features
- Chalkboard gag: Replaced with the Futurama opening caption: "A show out of ideas teams up with a show out of episodes".
- Couch gag: The Simpsons sit on the couch, but it turns out to be Hedonismbot.

Episode chronology
← Previous "Opposites A-Frack"	Next → "Blazed and Confused"
- The Simpsons season 26

"Simpsorama" is the sixth episode of the twenty-sixth season of the animated television series The Simpsons, and the 558th episode of the series overall. The episode was directed by Bob Anderson and written by J. Stewart Burns. It originally aired on the Fox network in the United States on November 9, 2014.

In this episode, the Planet Express crew comes to the present to prevent an incident in the future. This episode is a crossover with creator Matt Groening's other animated series Futurama that previously aired on Fox, and had aired its then-series finale "Meanwhile" on Comedy Central on September 4, 2013. The episode's title is a portmanteau of the titles of each series. John DiMaggio, David Herman, Maurice LaMarche, Phil LaMarr, Katey Sagal, Lauren Tom, Frank Welker, and Billy West reprised their roles from that series. The episode received mixed reviews.

== Plot ==
Principal Skinner shows a time capsule to be opened a thousand years later and tells each student in Bart's class to put something inside. Bart puts in a sandwich which he has blown his nose into, while Milhouse puts in his lucky rabbit's foot. As the town prepares to bury the capsule, nuclear waste from Springfield Nuclear Power Plant seeps into the hole, but they bury it anyway. That night, the Simpsons hear a noise outside their house. Marge hears something in the basement, and Homer and Bart go to investigate. They find Bender, who says he is from the future. Homer and Bender become friends. Lisa doubts that Bender is from the future, since present-day technology is relatively advanced, so she takes him to Professor Frink. Bender does not recall why he was sent to the present, so Frink restarts Bender, causing him to reveal his mission is to kill Homer. However, Bender cannot bring himself to do it.

A communication hologram from the Planet Express team appears out of Bender, showing rabbit-like creatures attacking New New York in the future. When Lisa asks why Homer must be killed, Professor Farnsworth replies that the creatures have Homer's DNA, and Bender was sent back to kill Homer before the creatures could evolve from him. Farnsworth, Leela, and Fry go into the past to kill Homer themselves, using Bender as a time machine, but Bender prevents Leela from shooting Homer. Farnsworth, Frink, and Lisa investigate the situation. Farnsworth reveals that the DNA was only half Homer's, with the other half belonging to Marge, and says they must kill whichever of the Simpson children the creatures evolved from. Bender shows another hologram from the future of the creatures transforming into lizard-like creatures that resemble Bart, who suggests that his sandwich in the time capsule, Milhouse's rabbit's foot, and the ooze in the hole could have created rabbit-like creatures with Bart's DNA. They go to dig up the capsule, but in the future, the creatures damage the time travel portal, sending everyone but Maggie and Bender to the future.

Farnsworth proposes they send the creatures into space to end the invasion. Lisa lures the creatures into Madison Cube Garden; the Planet Express Ship lifts the cube and hurls it into space. Meanwhile, Bender takes Maggie to the racetrack; since he has records of every horse race, he wins and gives a portion of his winnings to Maggie. The portal is fixed, and the Simpsons return to the present. Bender sets an alarm to wake him in 1,000 years and shuts down, and Homer puts him in the basement and pours him one last beer, which Bender appreciates.

The creatures are revealed to have landed on Omicron Persei 8, which is visited by Kang and Kodos.

== Production ==
The episode was first announced in July 2013, two days after "The Simpsons Guy"—the hour-long crossover between Family Guy and The Simpsons—was announced. It was originally planned to air as either the season 25 finale or the season 26 premiere. It was ultimately slated for November 9, 2014. In an interview with Entertainment Weekly about the episode, Groening said, "That was a really tough one to negotiate, because I had to talk to myself." Al Jean added, "They were going off the air, so I thought people would really love it if we had one more chance to see those characters"; adding, "We're always looking for things that are compatible with us, and I thought, 'Well, what's more compatible?' We do a joke, actually, about how similar Bender and Homer look. Like, they just erased Homer's hair." Jean also stated, "There's a thing in Futurama code where if you solve it, it says, 'Congratulations! You're a nerd.'"

The episode revealed that The Simpsons aliens Kang and Kodos are a lesbian couple. Al Jean told Entertainment Weekly: "People are asking: is this episode canon? And I go, 'What really happened—did Homer really fall off a cliff all those times and live?' But that being said: Yeah, sure, they're Kang and Kodos Johnson. They're a gay female couple in their species. They seemed to be married." In response to a sign in the episode showing Ralph Wiggum to have died in 2017, Jean said that it was in reference to the episode "Holidays of Future Passed" in which Ralph requires clones as his stupidity causes him to die in accidents. He declared that there would be no more deaths in the show, following the season premiere "Clown in the Dumps" in which Krusty the Clown's father died.

== Reception ==
=== Viewing figures ===
The episode received an audience of 6.70 million. It was the most-watched show on Fox that night.

=== Critical response ===
The episode received mixed reviews from critics. Max Nicholson of IGN called the storyline "a bit dull especially considering some of Futurama's more epic storylines."

Dennis Perkins and Zack Handlen of The A.V. Club gave the episode a B−, stating, "There's no reason for this episode to exist, at least not in terms of storytelling. Seeing the Simpsons family interact with Bender, Fry, Leela, Professor Farnsworth, and the rest has a certain automatic thrill to it, like any half-assed Internet mash-up (that thing I like is in the same place as that other thing I like! THIS CHANGES EVERYTHING), but that thrill never deepens or enriches our understanding of these disparate groups."

Darren Franich of Entertainment Weekly stated, ".. .where 'The Simpsons Guy' fell down the meta-rabbit hole, 'Simpsorama' mostly settled for simple gags, with a hit ratio that was better than Futurama season 6 but not quite up to the standards of Futurama season 4."

Screen Rant called it the best episode of the 26th season.

=== Awards and nominations ===
Re-Recording mixers Tara Paul and Mark Linden were nominated for a Primetime Emmy Award for Outstanding Sound Mixing for a Comedy or Drama Series (Half-Hour) and Animation for this episode at the 67th Primetime Creative Arts Emmy Awards.
