= The Wreck of the Relationship =

- The Simpsons episode
- Episode no.: Season 26; Episode 2
- Directed by: Chuck Sheetz
- Written by: Jeff Westbrook
- Production code: SABF17
- Original air date: October 5, 2014

Guest appearances
- Nick Offerman as Captain Bowditch; Marc Wilmore as the Narrator

Episode features
- Couch gag: The Simpsons find Itchy about to kill Scratchy on the couch. Homer intervenes by removing Itchy and allowing Scratchy to stay on the couch for several months, which ultimately starts annoying the family. Homer brings back Itchy, who effectively murders Scratchy.

Episode chronology
← Previous "Clown in the Dumps"	Next → "Super Franchise Me"
- The Simpsons season 26

"The Wreck of the Relationship" is the second episode of the twenty-sixth season of the American animated television series The Simpsons, and the 554th episode of the series overall. It first aired on the Fox network in the United States on October 5, 2014. The episode was directed by Chuck Sheetz and written by Jeff Westbrook.

The episode sees Marge send Homer and Bart onto a ship where their father-son conflict can be resolved, while she is left to manage her husband's fantasy football team. Nick Offerman guest starred as Captain Bowditch. The episode received mixed reviews.

This episode is notable for being the only TV-MA rated episode of the series due to a scene where a woman briefly flips the camera off, being seen uncensored in reruns on FXX and streaming on Simpsons World. However, it retained the original TV-14 DLV rating when streamed on Disney+, digital releases and further reruns on television due to the scene being censored.

== Plot ==
When Bart disrespects Homer's authority, Homer tries to be a stricter parent with him. Bart later refuses to eat one piece of broccoli at dinner, so Homer decides to sit at the table until Bart eats his broccoli, even though they both miss out on things that are important to them. Lisa prepares two identical-tasting fruit smoothies, one of which contains the broccoli, and offers them to Homer and Bart in an attempt to end the impasse. Bart deliberately spills the smoothies, sparking a brawl with Homer and prompting Marge to have them both kidnapped and put aboard a seagoing vessel, the Relation Ship. Captain Bowditch (Nick Offerman) offers Homer and Bart a chance to solve their relationship problems. While Homer recovers from scurvy, Bart enjoys and excels at sailing and ends up being promoted to midshipman, who can give out direct orders to the crew members, much to Homer's chagrin.

Homer rebels against Bart's newfound position and eventually gets drunk off a flask of rum. When the captain snatches the rum off Homer and reveals that he became a captain due to him being a recovering alcoholic, the captain gives into temptation and drinks the rum, becoming drunk with Homer. A huge storm begins, and Bart is left in charge of the ship, due to the captain's intoxication. Bart wants to sail around a lighthouse inlet to reach safe harbor, but Homer first says they need to drop anchor and batten down the hatches. When Bart complains of Homer not listening to his authority, Homer screams that Bart does not listen to his. To Homer's shock, Bart holds out a piece of broccoli he brought from home, eats it and then asks Homer to trust him. Homer does so, and they work together to get the ship safely home.

Meanwhile, Marge has to draft Homer's fantasy football team called "Somewhere Over the Dwayne Bowe", despite knowing nothing of the sport, and horrifies him by choosing a roster made mostly of placekickers. Initially put off by the trash talking from Homer's friends, she is advised by Patty and Selma to beat them in fantasy football to end the impasse. She and Lisa study football in detail and realize that a coming major storm event in the U.S. will lead to teams attempting and making record numbers of field goals and, thus, her roster ends up piling up a huge number of points and defeating all challengers, proving, as the narrator says, that "fantasy football is mostly just luck."

== Production ==
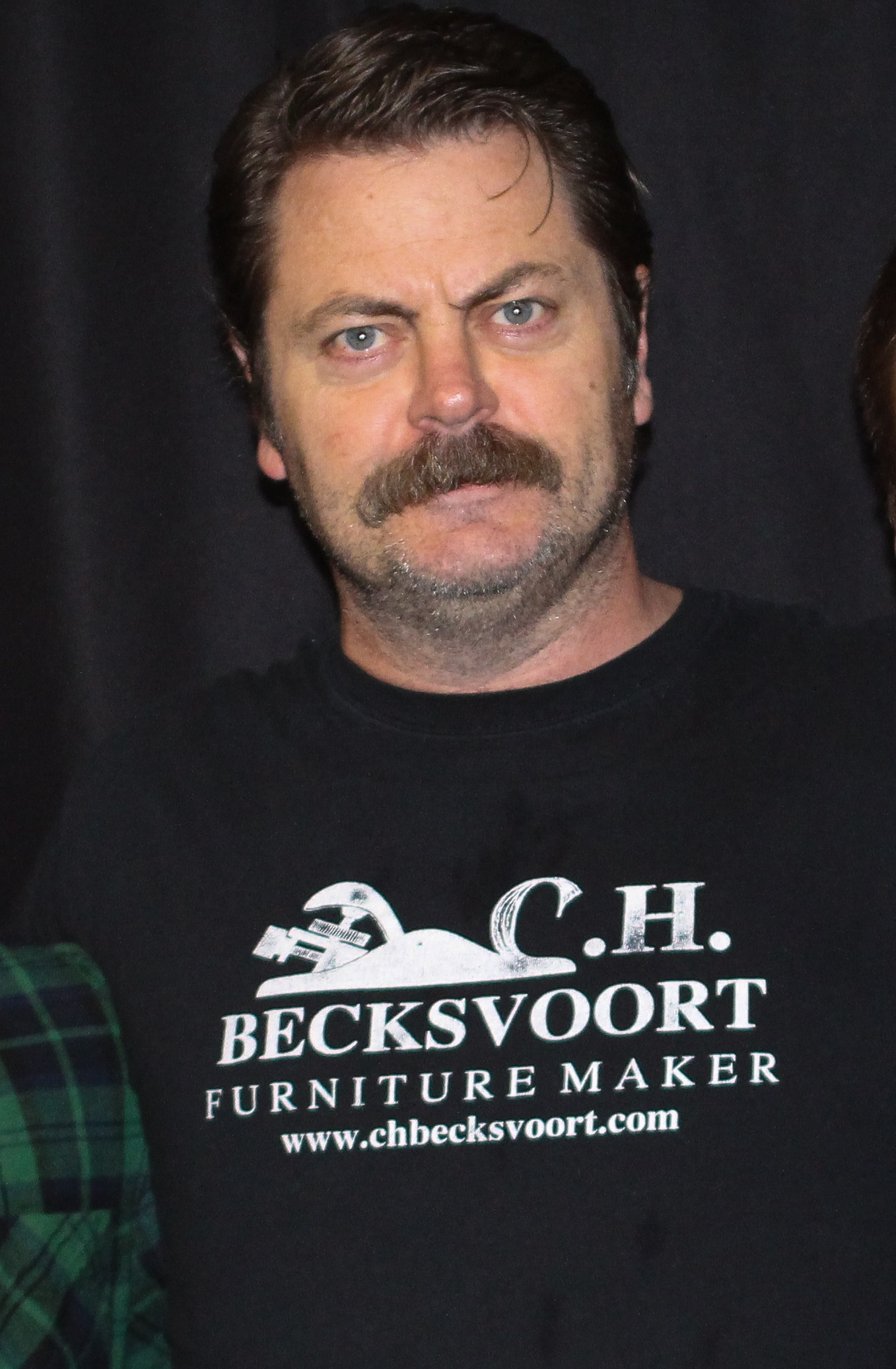
Nick Offerman voiced the captain.

In an interview with Entertainment Weekly, Parks and Recreation actor Nick Offerman revealed that he had been recommended for the voice of Captain Bowditch by Mike Scully, a writer on both The Simpsons and Parks and Recreation. Offerman never before thought that he would play a role on The Simpsons as "They’re writing parts for Paul McCartney", and was delighted to be cast as a sailor, due to his interest in naval literature.

== Release ==
Early in the episode, an elderly woman is shown giving the finger. On the Disney+ version, this gesture is censored. However, on the defunct Simpsons World streaming site, the gesture was shown uncensored. When the uncensored version is shown, the episode is given a parental rating of TV-MA, which is the only episode of the series with such a rating.

== Reception ==
The episode received an audience of 4.27 million, the highest rated show on Fox that night.

Dennis Perkins of The A.V. Club gave the episode a B−, stating “Homer’s journey in any good episode is funny and resonant because of the emotional realities involved, even if, the next time we see him, he has to learn the same lessons over again to drive the next plot. In fact, this infinite cycle is touching in its way, pointing out the futility of the Simpsons’ efforts, even as it rewards them for trying. The show's heart makes the struggle worthwhile, even if there's never going to be any real progress because of the world the show's set in.”

Tony Sokol of Den of Geek gave the episode 2.5 out of 5 stars. He stated that the episode was not the worst but the best part was the couch gag.
