= Peeping Mom =

- The Simpsons episode
- Episode no.: Season 26; Episode 18
- Directed by: Mark Kirkland
- Written by: John Frink
- Production code: TABF11
- Original air date: April 19, 2015

Episode features
- Couch gag: 5 popcorn kernels are placed on the couch, which then heats up in order to pop the Simpson family. Homer, who takes longest to pop, is burned.

Episode chronology
← Previous "Waiting for Duffman"	Next → "The Kids Are All Fight"
- The Simpsons season 26

"Peeping Mom" is the eighteenth episode of the twenty-sixth season of the American animated television series The Simpsons, and the 570th overall episode of the series. The episode was directed by Mark Kirkland and written by John Frink. It originally aired on the Fox network in the United States on April 19, 2015.

In this episode, Marge suspects Bart of destroying a part of the town, so she follows him to get him to confess while Homer bonds with Flanders' dog. The episode received negative reviews.

== Plot ==
Returning home with Maggie from errands, Marge discovers that a part of Springfield is now totally destroyed, due to an incident involving a bulldozer and a wrecking ball. As Chief Wiggum announces that Bart could be the culprit, Bart says that he was not involved at all in the incident. This prompts Marge to follow him everywhere until he confesses. However, Bart seems not to know what Marge is talking about, and is frustrated that Marge keeps following him and being overprotective. Marge eventually is fed up and gives up her plan.

Milhouse later meets up with Bart, where it is then revealed that Bart was really the culprit and he plans to create a new incident with the same bulldozer, during the 50th anniversary ceremony of the Springfield Sign. His plan is to knock down all the letters apart from "FIE", in order to create outrage within the residents. However, when he finds some fried chicken Marge cooked for him in his backpack during the ceremony, his conscience eventually wins out. Thinking quickly, he alters the prank so that the letters "F" and "D" remain, as a tribute to the Springfield Fire Department, to a much relieved crowd, and he finally admits his fault to Marge, which almost causes her to strangle him. Wiggum arrests him but allows him to give a hug to Marge.

Meanwhile, Homer learns that Ned Flanders got a new female dog named Baz. Though Homer is not her owner, he eventually bonds with this dog, ignoring Santa's Little Helper. This saddens Ned and he decides to give the dog to Homer, much to his and his sons' chagrin. However, Homer advises Ned to keep her since he will be a better owner than Homer, who in Baz's eyes is just another dog with whom she can play.

The end of this episode shows us Santa's Little Helper and Baz preparing to fight in a Far West style, only to end up peacefully taking a nap together.

== Reception ==
The episode received a 1.4 rating and was watched by a total of 3.23 million people.

Dennis Perkins of The A.V. Club gave the episode a B−, stating "’Peeping Mom’, unfortunately, shows what happens when the show dips back into the well without adequate reason...’Peeping Mom’ just doesn't go deep enough to be anything but an example of latter-day, scattershot Simpsons."

Tony Sokol of Den of Geek gave the episode 2.5 out of 5 stars. He stated that the episode just exists with not much happening. He said the best scene was Homer and Lisa's "back to back grumble fest."

Stacy Glanzman of TV Fanatic gave the episode 4 out of 5 stars. She highlighted the small details of the episode such as the pacifier silencer, Homer's moment with Lisa, and Homer's reasoning for giving the dog back to Ned.
