= Walking Big & Tall =

- The Simpsons episode
- Episode no.: Season 26; Episode 13
- Directed by: Chris Clements
- Written by: Michael Price
- Production code: TABF06
- Original air date: February 8, 2015

Guest appearances
- Kevin Michael Richardson as Albert; Pharrell Williams as himself

Episode features
- Couch gag: People start to eat each Simpson off of a sushi plate that is sitting on a moving boat, except for Homer, who falls into the water and gets eaten by a fish after the boat flips over.

Episode chronology
← Previous "The Musk Who Fell to Earth"	Next → "My Fare Lady"
- The Simpsons season 26

"Walking Big & Tall" is the thirteenth episode of the twenty-sixth season of the American animated television series The Simpsons, and the 565th overall episode of the series. The episode was directed by Chris Clements and written by Michael Price. It originally aired on the Fox network in the United States on February 8, 2015.

In this episode, Homer joins a support group that embraces obesity and protests unrealistic thin figures. Kevin Michael Richardson guest starred as Albert, and musician Pharrell Williams appeared as himself. The episode received mixed reviews.

== Plot ==
At a town hall meeting, the town discovers that its anthem "Only Springfield" is being used by numerous towns in North America and around the world such as Tuscaloosa, Austin, Oakland, Calgary, Provo, Ulaanbaatar and Area 51, after former mayor Hans Moleman bought the anthem from a salesman. Lisa and Bart compose a new anthem called "Why Springfield, Why Not" and perform it in the theater with other students. Homer has difficulty sitting in his seat at the performance due to his obesity, and when he must stand to give a standing ovation, he inadvertently tears out his row of seats, causing destruction to the theater. Marge urges him to join a weight-control group, but the one he joins is run by the mobility scooter-bound Albert, who states that obesity is beautiful, and Homer decides to embrace his obesity.

After the group causes a disruption outside a fashion store which they claim promotes unrealistically thin figures, Marge urges Homer to leave the group and start a diet, but he refuses. Confronting Homer and the obese group at a rally, Marge finally points out that Homer should not follow Albert, who she says is too lazy to walk. Albert attempts to get up from his scooter to prove her wrong, but suffers a fatal heart attack. At Albert's funeral, Homer delivers a eulogy where, upon learning that the deceased was only 23, he pleads for the obese people to lose weight. He and Marge walk home as he promises to yo-yo diet, and a montage shows Homer's physique changing drastically with his age over the next few decades.

== Production ==
The episode's opening was inspired by a story about a TV station hiring a composer to write a city-pride song who then sold the same song to other cities. Musician Asa Taccone and episode writer Michael Price wrote the new Springfield anthem.

Musician Pharrell Williams guest starred as himself. Executive producer Al Jean said that Williams would offer to write a new anthem for Springfield.

== Cultural references ==
Pharrell Williams sings his song "Happy," which gets him kicked out of town.

== Reception ==
=== Viewing figures ===
The episode received an audience of 2.78 million, making it the second most watched show on Fox that night.

=== Critical response ===
Dennis Perkins of The A.V. Club gave the episode a B−, saying "The careless construction of latter-day Simpsons episodes is never more pronounced than in ‘Walking Big & Tall,’ a slapdash amalgam of two marginally promising plots which would have benefitted from some room to breathe. Even more than the usual resulting thinness of main and sub-plot, ‘Walking Big & Tall’ sets up one A-story and simply abandons it in favor of another, the baffling result of which is a confused two-headed monster of an episode whose flashes of amusement wither under the latter plot's mean-spirited succession of fat jokes".

Tony Sokol of Den of Geek gave this episode 4 out of 5 stars. He stated that the episode was more original that other episodes this season and highlighted the list that Homer reads to Lenny, Carl, Barney, and Moe.

=== Awards and nominations ===
Michael Price was nominated for a Writers Guild of America Award for Outstanding Writing in Animation at the 68th Writers Guild of America Awards for his script to this episode.
