= Super Franchise Me =

- The Simpsons episode
- Episode no.: Season 26; Episode 3
- Directed by: Mark Kirkland
- Written by: Bill Odenkirk
- Production code: SABF19
- Original air date: October 12, 2014

Episode features
- Couch gag: A parody of the cover of the 1970 Cat Stevens album Tea for the Tillerman, with its closing track playing over it.

Episode chronology
← Previous "The Wreck of the Relationship"	Next → "Treehouse of Horror XXV"
- The Simpsons season 26

"Super Franchise Me" is the third episode of the twenty-sixth season of the American animated television series The Simpsons, and the 555th episode of the series overall. The episode was directed by Mark Kirkland and written by Bill Odenkirk. It originally aired on the Fox network in the United States on October 12, 2014.

The episode sees Marge open a sandwich franchise after her sandwiches become popular, but begin to struggle when Cletus opens with the same franchise across the road. The episode received positive reviews.

The episode was dedicated to the memory of Jan Hooks, who had died on October 9.

== Plot ==
Ned Flanders and his sons are trying to reduce their use of electricity in the house but discover that Homer is using their electricity to power a Ferris Wheel and a freezer full of meat. When Ned confiscates the freezer, Marge puts the meat to use by making sandwiches, which prove popular at Springfield Elementary School when Bart and Lisa take them there as currency.

Trudy Zangler of Mother Hubbard's Sandwich Cupboard advises Marge to open a franchise with the company. It initially struggles due to its incompetent staff (Marge fires Gil Gunderson for doing two jobs at once and Shauna Chalmers for stealing the register money), but begins to make a nice profit when the family takes over. However, business slows again when an express outlet with the same franchise opens across the road, operated by Cletus and his family. Marge is depressed and goes to Moe's, who tells her a scam to get out of her contract with the franchise. Homer goes into the restaurant in disguise and has hot coffee spilled on his crotch and gets hit by a fire extinguisher; Marge then tells a previously unsympathetic Trudy that the family's lack of emergency medical training is a violation of her franchise contract. To prevent a massive lawsuit, Trudy reluctantly gives Marge back all of her costs and Marge exults that things turned out relatively well for the family as they broke even.

The episode ends with a scene showing a caveman Homer making the first ever sandwich from ground sloth meat between two squirrels, but then he wanders to his death inside a tar pit. In the present, Homer admires the fossilized sandwich.

== Cultural references ==
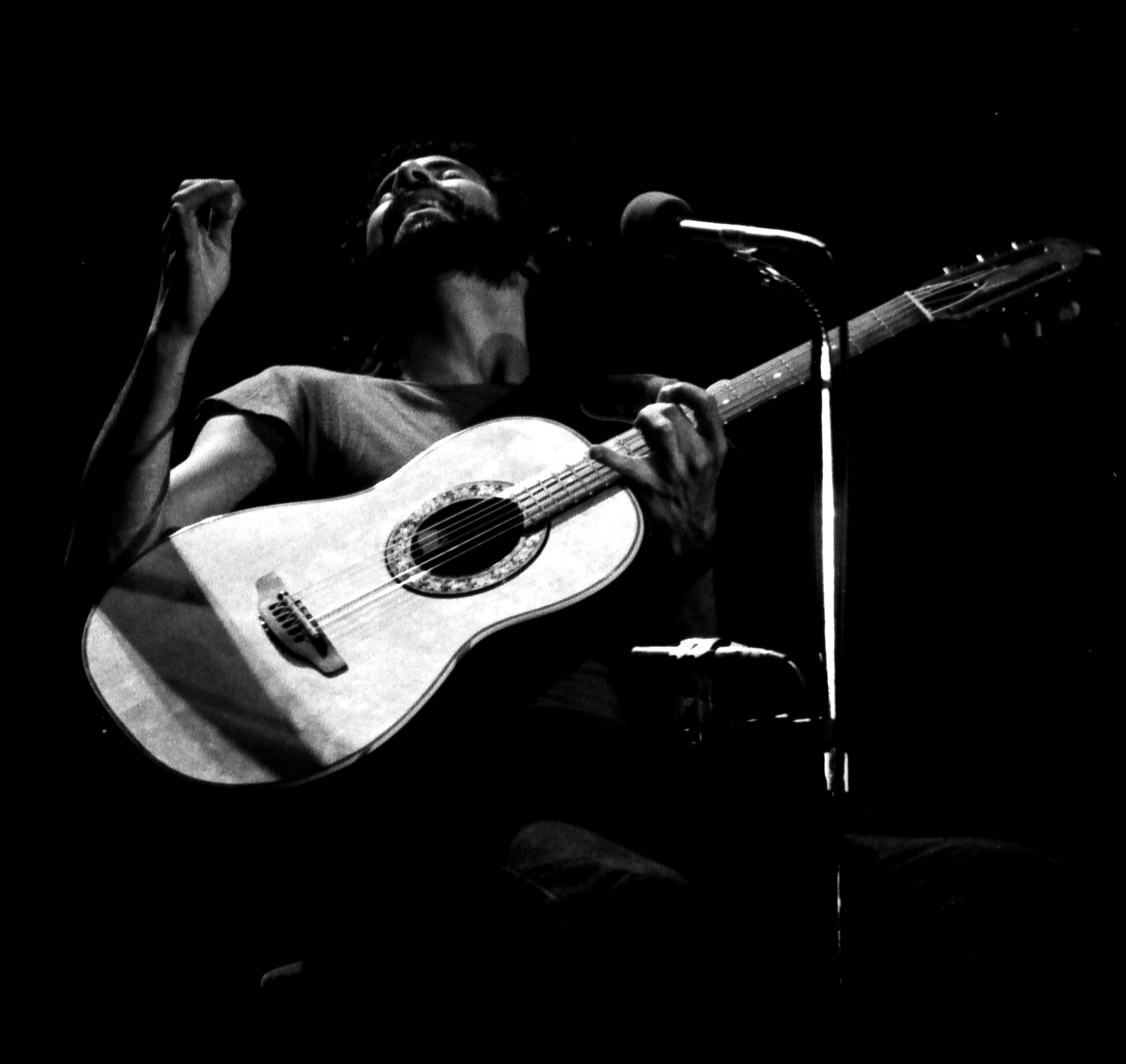
The episode's couch gag parodies the cover of the album Tea for the Tillerman by Cat Stevens.

The couch gag for the episode parodies the cover of the 1970 album Tea for the Tillerman by the British musician Cat Stevens, and has the album's title track playing over it.

During the sandwich making scenes, part of L'Estasi dell'Oro by Ennio Morricone is played.

Near the end of the episode, a "Simpsonized" version of the famous French painting "A Sunday Afternoon on the Island of La Grande Jatte" is briefly shown. The character Edna Krabappel, despite having died - and being eulogized by Ned Flanders in Season 25 - is shown standing with Jasper in the background.

== Reception ==
=== Viewing figures ===
The episode received an audience of 7.33 million viewers. It was the second most watched show on Fox that night, after The OT.

=== Critical response ===
"Super Franchise Me" received generally positive reviews. The A.V. Club gave the episode a B. Dennis Perkins wrote in the review, "Possessed of a unity of purpose, 'Super Franchise Me' allows its characters to breathe. Written by Bill Odenkirk, the episode sees Marge opening a franchised sandwich restaurant. No guest stars, no special events, no B-story—the episode avoids much (if not all) of the clutter that’s been distracting in many of the Simpsons episodes of the last few years and focuses on the story at hand. If that story isn’t anything special, it’s at least peppered with enough funny little character touches and low-key laughs to make the show resemble itself at its best."

Stacy Glanzman of TV Fanatic gave the episode a rating of 3.0/5, calling it an "okay episode".

The Hollywood Reporter contrasted the nostalgic couch gag with the futuristic Don Hertzfeldt-directed one for the episode "Clown in the Dumps" which aired two weeks prior.

=== Themes and analysis ===
H. Peter Steeves cites this episode's story of Cletus taking business away from Marge's franchise as a demonstration of when a mass-produced commodity becomes the norm and any local product is compared to the new norm. He also stated that the story is also "a commentary on what happens when far-away corporations try to control the local."
