= I Won't Be Home for Christmas (The Simpsons) =

- The Simpsons episode
- Promotional poster
- Episode no.: Season 26; Episode 9
- Directed by: Mark Kirkland
- Written by: Al Jean
- Production code: TABF03
- Original air date: December 7, 2014

Episode features
- Chalkboard gag: "Reindeer meat does not taste like chicken"
- Couch gag: There is a message that reads: "Now for obligatory Frozen reference", before cutting to a snow couch, where Lisa, appearing as Elsa, is sitting. Bart as Kristoff hits her with a snowball, and she immediately creates a giant ice palace with Bart stuck at the top. Homer appears as Olaf, and bites his own nose, disappointed to discover it is simply a carrot.

Episode chronology
← Previous "Covercraft"	Next → "The Man Who Came to Be Dinner"
- The Simpsons season 26

"I Won't Be Home for Christmas" is the ninth episode of the twenty-sixth season of the American animated television series The Simpsons, and the 561st episode of the series. The episode was directed by Mark Kirkland and written by Al Jean. It originally aired on the Fox network in the United States on December 7, 2014. It is the thirteenth Christmas episode of the show.

In this episode, an angry Marge kicks Homer out of the house when he comes home late on Christmas Eve. When Moe explains why Homer was late, Marge goes to search for him. The episode received mixed to positive reviews by critics.

== Plot ==
The episode begins with Comic Book Guy and Kumiko Albertson watching the Cosmic Wars Special, with Comic Book Guy expressing shock and outrage that the special actually gets worse the more he watches it, and Kumiko stating he has every right to be angry.

Homer plans to fulfill Marge's Christmas Eve wishes by leaving work on time and arriving home to celebrate Christmas with his family. However, after suffering a car accident on the way home, he stops for a quick drink at Moe's, and when he tries to leave, Moe convinces him to stay there by honestly telling Homer how lonely and depressed he is. Homer learns that Moe had the clock 2 hours behind on purpose, and when he finally gets home, Marge is enraged and kicks him out, saying she does not want him in the house on Christmas. Homer then leaves on an odyssey through a deserted and chilly Springfield, with Moe inadvertently compounding his sadness by being preoccupied with karaoke when Homer shows up to try and talk to him, and to add insult to injury, Homer's car gets towed with his cell phone frozen inside it.

Meanwhile, Marge becomes depressed without Homer, but tells Bart and Lisa that she does not plan to forgive him. At that point, Moe, having found Homer's wallet that he left in the tavern, climbs down the 742 Evergreen Terrace chimney and tells Marge the truth about why Homer was out late on Christmas Eve. Marge immediately tries to call Homer and ask him to come home, but as he lost his phone, she ends up going out to look for him. Homer ends up at the miserable local movie theatre to watch a depressing Life is Beautiful-type of film alongside other lost souls like Kirk Van Houten, the Crazy Cat Lady, Groundskeeper Willie, and Gil.

After Marge searches through the city and Homer ends up at a depressing party for mall workers, they each have epiphanies: Homer says that being without his family at Christmas is much worse than being with them, and Marge says that she should not always assume Homer is doing stupid things for no reasons. The two finally find each other at the party, reconcile and look forward to a happy new year.

The final scene features a preview of the next episode, "The Man Who Came to Be Dinner".

== Cultural references ==
The couch gag portrays some of the Simpson family members at characters from the 2013 film Frozen. Lisa appears as Elsa, Homer appears as Olaf, and Santa's Little Helper appears as Sven.

The song "Someday at Christmas" by Stevie Wonder plays as Homer wanders through the mall.

== Reception ==
=== Viewing figures ===
The episode received an audience of 6.52 million, making it the most watched show on Fox that night.

=== Critical response ===
Dennis Perkins of The A.V. Club gave the episode a B−, saying "The moderate pleasure to be gleaned from ‘I Won’t Be Home for Christmas’ comes from a show trying to wring some heart and laughs from a quarter-century of well-trod territory. The pleasures aren't inconsiderable, but they're effortful."

Tony Sokol of Den of Geek gave the episode 3 out of 5 stars. He stated that the episode was not as good as past Christmas episodes, but there were some laughs.

=== Awards and nominations ===
Writer Al Jean was nominated for an Annie Award for Outstanding Achievement for Writing in an Animated Television/Broadcast Production for this episode at the 43rd Annie Awards.
