= Treehouse of Horror XXV =

- The Simpsons episode
- Promotional poster depicting the three segments of the episode. Top left: "A Clockwork Yellow"; Top right: "School is Hell"; Bottom: "The Others"
- Episode no.: Season 26; Episode 4
- Directed by: Matthew Faughnan
- Written by: Stephanie Gillis
- Production code: SABF21
- Original air date: October 19, 2014

Guest appearance
- John Ratzenberger as CGI Homer Simpson

Episode chronology
← Previous "Super Franchise Me"	Next → "Opposites A-Frack"
- The Simpsons season 26

"Treehouse of Horror XXV" is the fourth episode of the twenty-sixth season of the American animated television series The Simpsons, the 25th episode in the Treehouse of Horror series of Halloween specials, and the 556th episode overall. It originally aired on the Fox network in the United States on October 19, 2014.

The episode, like the other Treehouse of Horror episodes, comprises three self-contained segments. In "School Is Hell", Bart finds his ideal new school in Hell; in "A Clockwork Yellow", Moe leads a Clockwork Orange gang; and in "The Others", the Simpson family are visited by their former selves. A clip from the episode was first shown to San Diego Comic-Con in July 2014, and showrunner Al Jean gave an interview about "The Others" in September. The final segment features a sequence in which the Simpson family is animated in the styles of several other media franchises, in which John Ratzenberger provides the guest voice of a computer-generated Homer.

The episode was watched by an audience of 7.76 million. It received a positive reception from critics, although opinions were divided on which segments were the strongest, and there were differing views on the quality of the Stanley Kubrick references in "A Clockwork Yellow". "Treehouse of Horror XXV" was nominated for the Primetime Emmy Award for Outstanding Animated Program.

== Plot ==
The episode opens with Kang and Kodos narrating a Johnny Carson-style opening (complete with clips from classic "Treehouse" episodes, as well as several made up episodes). All of the celebrity guests announced (e.g. Clint Eastwood, George Clooney, John Travolta) have been killed and displayed to spell the episode's title.

=== School is Hell ===
Principal Skinner has put Bart in detention. While dusting a desk, he finds an Aramaic inscription. Lisa uses an app to translate it which transports the pair to Hell, which is a school. Bart excels in all of his diabolical subjects (including torture, destruction, and making sure that Major League Baseball rules ensure the unending dominance of the New York Yankees) and asks his parents if he can study there permanently. For his final test, he must torture Homer; despite Bart's hesitation, Homer lets him. A disfigured Homer proudly watches Bart graduate from Hell school as "maledictorian".

=== A Clockwork Yellow ===
Moe has a Clockwork Orange-style gang in London along with Lenny, Carl and Homer. Homer falls for a girl (Marge) who convinces him to quit and the gang falls apart. Years later, Moe is attacked at home in a style similar to his gang's former ways and asks Homer to bring the gang back together; Lenny and Carl (who have become police officers) join them. They attack an Eyes Wide Shut-style masked orgy and several other of Stanley Kubrick's films (like 2001: A Space Odyssey, Full Metal Jacket and Barry Lyndon) are parodied in a fight sequence. As Moe gets beaten by two party guests, he narrates that he was "Beaten, bruised" and "couldn't score at an orgy" but was happy to be back with his old gang. Kubrick is then shown in an editing room and asks for the entire film to be re-shot.

=== The Others ===
In a parody of The Others, the Simpson family find unexplained frosty chocolate milkshakes and that their TV only shows Married... with Children. After a ghost attacks him in his sleep, Homer summons the ghosts, who turn out to be the family's former selves from The Tracey Ullman Show. Homer is attracted to the ghost Marge who prefers him to the former grumpy Homer, so the jealous living Marge kills herself to become a ghost by putting her head in the oven. The ghost Homer becomes jealous and bludgeons the living Homer unconscious with a toaster while he is in the bathtub, causing him to drown and then reappear as a ghost. Bart leaps across to a tree to avoid doing housework, but when Lisa chases after him, she misses the tree and falls to the ground, unknowingly killing herself, her ghost then chokes Bart with his slingshot as revenge, causing him to also fall to the ground and die instantly, becoming a bitter ghost. Groundskeeper Willie takes the children's corpses to make stew and it is implied that he murdered Maggie. After encountering Dr. Marvin Monroe, who is in spiritual limbo and can't walk fully through walls, Marge settles her differences with her older counterpart and both women force Homer to choose between them. Homer chooses his modern-day wife over the older ghost after she wins him over with an emotional speech. The next morning at the breakfast table, Lisa asks if there could ever be any other incarnations of the Simpsons and a range of Simpson families based on other animations are then shown, including but not limited to: Pixar, anime, Adventure Time, South Park, Archer, Sylvain Chomet designs, LEGO designs, animals versions and the Despicable Me Minions. The segment ends with the original version of Homer unsuccessfully trying to photograph a good portrait of the two families together.

== Production ==
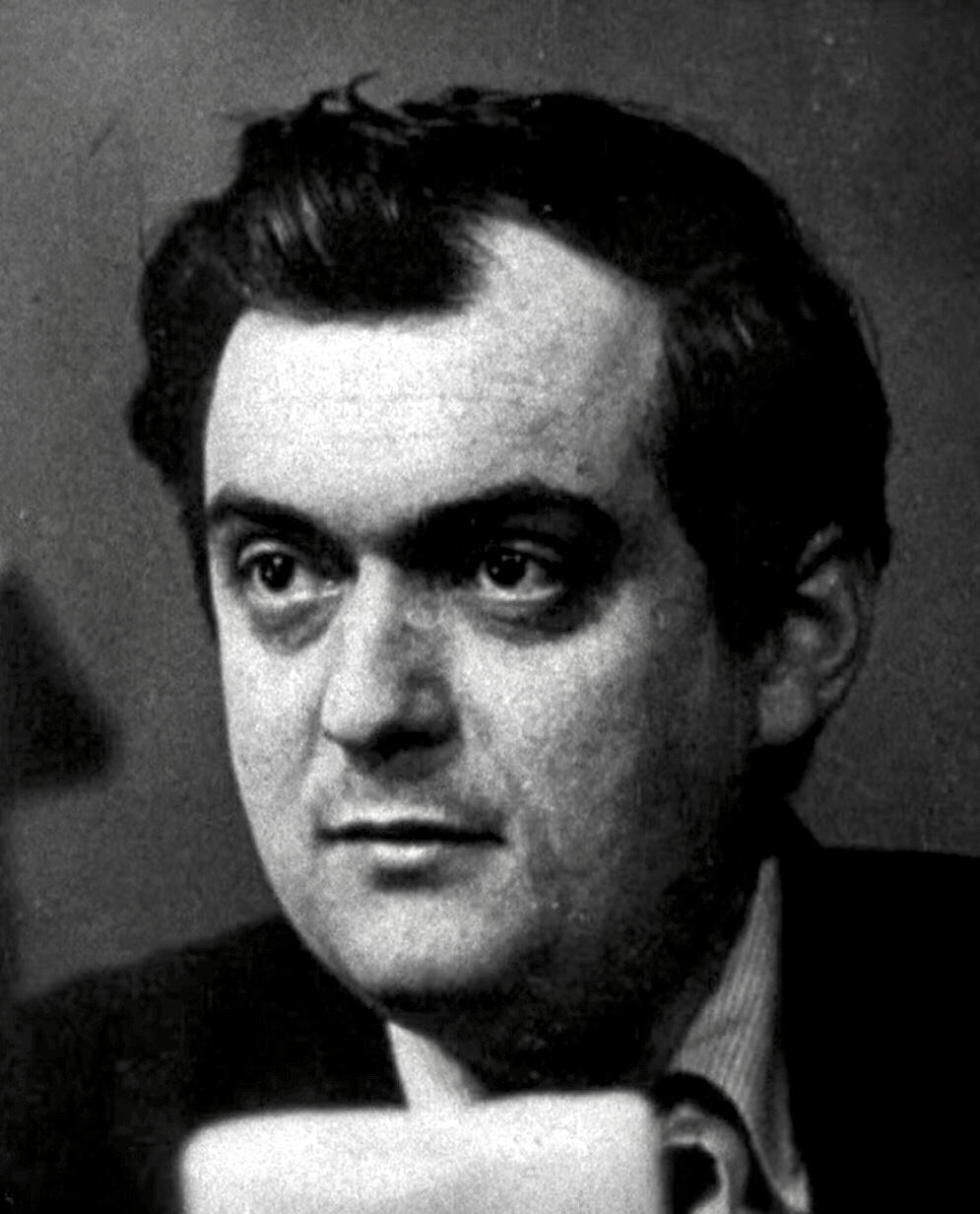
"A Clockwork Yellow" references several of the films of Stanley Kubrick, most notably A Clockwork Orange.

A clip from "A Clockwork Yellow" was first shown at San Diego Comic-Con in July 2014. Executive producer Al Jean spoke to Entertainment Weekly in September 2014 about the third segment of the episode, and the difference in voices between the older and newer versions of the characters. He said that although Dan Castellaneta's portrayal of Homer is better remembered for its evolution over time, Nancy Cartwright's voicing of Bart changed as well, because "it was lower-register, and you can see in the difference in this segment. It was really funny to get the interplay [between the two versions of the Simpsons] and for the actors to see the voice evolution. The great thing is we didn't have to ask—we already had the cast hired for the Tracey Ullman Simpsons". He also revealed that the segment expanded on an earlier episode which implied that the Ullman Simpsons were murdered and buried under the family home, stating "if people want a real Halloween bloodbath, they get it."

In the first segment, Bart summons Hot Stuff the Little Devil, who has been sentenced to Hell for his "lame" comics. The second segment in this episode titled "A Clockwork Yellow" parodies Stanley Kubrick's A Clockwork Orange, and features references to his other films, including Eyes Wide Shut, 2001: A Space Odyssey, and Full Metal Jacket. In the finale of the third segment, Lisa asks if there is a possibility that "an evil marketing entity" could produce millions of others. The family is then reproduced in the animation styles of numerous other series including Adventure Time, Archer and South Park, as well as Japanese anime, the Minions from Despicable Me, and alternative versions from other episodes of The Simpsons. A computer-generated Homer is voiced by guest star, Pixar voice actor John Ratzenberger.

== Reception ==
The episode received an audience of 7.76 million, a rise of 0.31 million viewers from the previous week's episode, "Super Franchise Me". It was the second most watched show on Fox that night, after The OT; and in the 18-49 demographic, it was the highest rated scripted show of the night (3.5) on all four networks only beaten by NBC's Football Night in America.

The episode received positive reviews. Dennis Perkins of The A.V. Club gave the episode a B, praising the cinematic quality of the first two segments while concluding that the third was the poorest. He was impressed by how the Kubrick references in the second segment used originality rather than being a "perfunctory checklist", and how the director's "ow" at the end had "comic aplomb". Writing for the New York Daily News, Don Kaplan gave the episode four stars out of five, singling the third segment out as the best, and deeming the Kubrick homage "smart and silly". A more mixed review came from Alex Strachan on Postmedia News' Canada.com, who found the second segment to be the best and the other two to be average, although he admitted that the Kubrick references were "occasionally a little too inside or self-indulgent for their own good". He concluded that "there's something in Treehouse of Horror XXV for everyone. A little like a Halloween bag of candy".

The episode was nominated for the Award for Outstanding Animated Program at the 67th Primetime Creative Arts Emmy Awards, losing to the Cartoon Network miniseries Over the Garden Wall.
