= The Man Who Came to Be Dinner =

- The Simpsons episode
- Episode no.: Season 26; Episode 10
- Directed by: David Silverman
- Written by: Al Jean & David Mirkin
- Production code: RABF15
- Original air date: January 4, 2015

Episode features
- Couch gag: A piano version of "Great Gate of Kiev" is played in the background as the gag showcases artwork of each Simpson. The camera turns to the Simpsons sitting at an art gallery. Homer grabs the remote control and all the artwork on the wall changes channels, pleasing the family.

Episode chronology
← Previous "I Won't Be Home for Christmas"	Next → "Bart's New Friend"
- The Simpsons season 26

"The Man Who Came to Be Dinner" is the tenth episode of the twenty-sixth season of the American animated television series The Simpsons, and the 562nd episode of the series. The episode was directed by David Silverman and written by Al Jean and David Mirkin. It originally aired on the Fox network in the United States on January 4, 2015.

In this episode, the Simpson family is transported to the home planet of Kang and Kodos where they are to be eaten. The episode received mixed reviews.

== Plot ==
The Simpsons go to Diz-Nee-Land (a parody of the theme park Disneyland). After a long journey, they dislike all of the rides they visit, and decide to go to "Rocket to Your Doom", a just-opened queue-less ride which was not on the map. They get in and it immediately transforms into a spaceship. At first, the family is skeptical, but a screen appears with Kang and Kodos on it telling them that they are being taken to their home planet Rigel 7. At the planet, Kang and Kodos take the Simpsons as exhibitions to a zoo.

After a while, the Simpsons are informed they must choose one of them to be dined in a ritual. Everyone votes for Homer to be sacrificed — even he changes his vote from Bart to himself after seeing the other votes — but he gets rescued by some hippie-looking Rigelians who believe that eating other sentient species is wrong. After an excessive party, he gets on another spaceship only for one that also pleases all desires, but he realizes he will not enjoy it without his family and goes back to rescue them.

The Rigelians decide to eat the rest of the family and glaze them over giant plates with some lettuce and tomato. When Homer offers to be eaten instead, he gets put on a similar plate with the Rigelians now refusing to spare the others. The Rigelian Queen then eats Homer's severed buttock and gets fatally poisoned. It is revealed that the Simpsons are all fatally toxic to eat due to the fast food diet they eat with Lisa being considered the most toxic due to her vegetarian diet.

Following the Rigelian Queen's death, the Simpsons are sent home on a spaceship that resembles the interior of the original starship USS Enterprise. They set course to Earth, but after a call from Grampa, the family decides to go anywhere else but home.

The credits happen over a montage of several images spoofing Star Trek TV and film franchise scenes all the while set to Star Trek's closing theme by Alexander Courage.

== Production ==
The episode was originally scheduled to air on May 19, 2013 as the season finale of The Simpsons season 24, but was replaced by "Dangers on a Train". As a result, the production code is older compared to the rest of season 26.

Just prior to the broadcast of the episode, Al Jean and David Mirkin wrote on Twitter that the episode (which had been produced in 2012 and was originally set to air on May 19, 2013) had been held back because it was being "seriously considered" for adaptation into a sequel film of The Simpsons Movie, as the episode was "very cinematic;" they cited a similar sequence of events that occurred earlier in the show's run with the episode "Kamp Krusty." Jean also stated that he was sure reasons the episode both could and would not work as a film would occur to those that viewed the episode and later expanded that there was the fear of the potential film being considered "not canonical" with the TV series and the potential backlash of overcoming it by using a "memory wipe".

== Reception ==
The episode received an audience of 10.62 million and a 4.7/13 rating/share in the 18-49 demographic, making it the most watched show on Fox that night and the show's highest rating since the twenty-fifth season episode "Steal This Episode."

Dennis Perkins of The A.V. Club gave the episode a "D+" rating, criticizing the unrealistic nature of the episode. Perkins said "It would be a lot easier to make the case that The Simpsons still has value if the people behind the show seemed to give a damn. But an episode like 'The Man Who Came to Be Dinner' is a product of such slapdash, breezy disregard for what makes The Simpsons The Simpsons that it functions as a dispiriting signpost to the show's hastening irrelevance."

In contrast, Tony Sokol of Den of Geek gave it 4.5 stars and called it "a singular highlight."

== Cultural references ==
The episode’s title is a reference to the play The Man Who Came to Dinner, later adapted into a 1942 film.

The spaceship disguised as an amusement park ride is based on an episode of the 1960s sci-fi series The Outer Limits called "Second Chance".

The performance by the Rigel Seven boys’ choir is a homage to the choir sequence in the Steven Spielberg film Empire of the Sun.

A flashback from the fourth season episode "Homer's Triple Bypass" shows the young Homer in the chorus. The producers remarked in commentary they did that scene as homage to the same film.
