= Blazed and Confused =

- The Simpsons episode
- Episode no.: Season 26; Episode 7
- Directed by: Rob Oliver
- Written by: Carolyn Omine and William Wright
- Production code: TABF01
- Original air date: November 16, 2014

Guest appearances
- Willem Dafoe as Jack Lassen; Kelsey Grammer as Sideshow Bob; David Silverman as himself

Episode features
- Couch gag: The couch is a ski lift. The Simpson family walks in, ready to go skiing. The couch rises up. Seconds later, the couch comes back down, Homer, Marge, Bart, and Lisa are all injured and Maggie comes in with a medal.

Episode chronology
← Previous "Simpsorama"	Next → "Covercraft"
- The Simpsons season 26

"Blazed and Confused" is the seventh episode of the twenty-sixth season of the American animated television series The Simpsons, and 559th episode in the series. The episode was directed by Rob Oliver and written by Carolyn Omine and William Wright. It originally broadcast on the Fox network in the United States on November 16, 2014.

In this episode, Bart seeks revenge on his new teacher, Mr. Lassen, after he humiliates him. Willem Dafoe guest starred as Jack Lassen. The episode received mixed reviews.

== Plot ==
The Springfield school district holds its annual "Dance of the Lemons," in which each school chooses its worst tenured teacher to be randomly reassigned to another campus. Springfield Elementary School receives Jack Lassen, who is put in charge of Bart's class. Having deliberately cut his cheek to give himself an intimidating scar, Lassen bullies Nelson and gives Bart an embarrassing haircut. Bart schemes to bring him down with help from Milhouse. Using a fake social network profile under Miss Hoover's name, they discover that Lassen has been chosen to ignite the eponymous effigy at the year's "Blazing Guy" desert festival.

Meanwhile, the Simpsons have planned to go camping at a site that requires reservations a year in advance. Homer has forgotten to book a spot, upsetting Marge, but Bart solves both of their problems by suggesting that they attend Blazing Guy instead. At the festival, Marge drinks a cup of tea provided by a fellow attendee in order to relax, not knowing that it contains hallucinogens which cause a prolonged delirium. Bart and Milhouse spray the effigy with fire-retardant chemicals to prevent Lassen from being able to light it, ruining his important moment. The boys climb the effigy to keep clear of an enraged Lassen as he blows fire at them from a burning tuba. Homer tries to save them by launching himself from a catapult, but instead hits the effigy's leg and triggers its collapse. Lassen is shunned by the festival crowd, while Bart and Milhouse escape safely. The Simpsons start for home but inadvertently forget Marge, who finds herself alone in the desert and the festival long over once the effects of the tea finally wear off.

Upon learning of Lassen's behavior at the festival, Superintendent Chalmers and Principal Skinner fire him. Lassen gets a new job as a prison guard and soon makes the acquaintance of inmate Sideshow Bob. The two begin making plans to kill Bart, having discovered their mutual hatred of him, but Bob rejects the deal after Lassen suggests that they share the actual kill.

== Production ==
In July 2014, it was reported that Willem Dafoe would guest star as Bart Simpson's new teacher. Dafoe previously guest starred in The Simpsons as a different character in the eighth season episode "The Secret War of Lisa Simpson".

== Reception ==
The episode received an audience of 6.70 million, making it the most watched show on Fox that night.

Dennis Perkins of The A.V. Club gave the episode a B−, commenting that Lassen "fell flat" because Dafoe's reputation as a menacing actor comes from his physicality rather than his voice. He also observed that the series increasingly used Bart's misbehavior for jokes and plot development rather than emotional impact, but that this episode featured “classic Milhouse" moments in the episode, including urinating himself on Lassen's entrance and joining in with Lassen in bullying Nelson.

Tony Sokol of Den of Geek gave the episode 4 out of 5 stars. He stated that there were plenty of laughs that were not tired or forced.
