= Clown in the Dumps =

- The Simpsons episode
- Promotional poster for the episode
- Episode no.: Season 26; Episode 1
- Directed by: Steven Dean Moore
- Written by: Joel H. Cohen
- Production code: SABF20
- Original air date: September 28, 2014

Guest appearances
- Kelsey Grammer as Sideshow Bob; Don Hertzfeldt as "The Sampsans"; Maurice LaMarche as Clive Meriwether and Rodney Dangerfield; Jackie Mason as Rabbi Krustofsky; David Hyde Pierce as himself; Jeff Ross as himself; Sarah Silverman as herself

Episode features
- Chalkboard gag: "Spoiler alert: Unfortunately, my dad doesn't die"
- Couch gag: A surreal depiction of a future episode of the show created by Don Hertzfeldt.

Episode chronology
← Previous "The Yellow Badge of Cowardge"	Next → "The Wreck of the Relationship"
- The Simpsons season 26

"Clown in the Dumps" is the twenty-sixth season premiere of the American animated television series The Simpsons and the 553rd episode of the series overall. It first aired in the United States on the Fox network on September 28, 2014, with the Family Guy crossover episode "The Simpsons Guy" airing afterwards. This episode was dedicated to the memory of Louis Castellaneta, the father of The Simpsons lead voice actor Dan Castellaneta. It was written by Joel H. Cohen and directed by Steven Dean Moore, with Don Hertzfeldt guest directing the opening title sequence. Jeff Ross, Sarah Silverman, and David Hyde Pierce guest starred as themselves, with Jackie Mason and Kelsey Grammer reprising their respective roles as Rabbi Krustofski and Sideshow Bob, while Maurice LaMarche voiced several minor characters.

In the episode, Krusty the Clown is offended by a comedy roast and asks his father, Rabbi Hyman Krustofsky, if he believes that Krusty is funny. Hyman disagrees and then dies, leaving Krusty upset that his father did not admire his work. After an alcohol-induced coma, Krusty vows to do good in the world, and eventually discovers (with the help of Bart) that his father did enjoy his work. The death of Krusty's father also causes Lisa to obsess over the health and safety of Homer, her own father.

In October 2013, during the promotion of the show's previous season, executive producer Al Jean revealed that a character would die in this episode. In July 2014, after the announcement of the title of the episode, several media outlets incorrectly presumed that Krusty would die. The choice of Hyman as the character who died was deemed by some critics as anti-climactic due to his minor role in the show, although other reviewers praised the episode's conclusion of the relationship between Krusty and his father.

== Plot ==
Krusty the Clown appears on a comedy roast by Jeff Ross and Sarah Silverman, and is offended by them. He seeks the advice of his father, Rabbi Krustofsky, on whether he is funny; the rabbi says he always thought Krusty was "eh..." but dies mid-sentence, right before he is about to tell Krusty what he really thinks of his comedy. With his father's last words appearing to be dismissive, and believing that nobody finds him funny anymore, Krusty quits his show.

Bart attempts to reinspire Krusty by showing him old episodes of the show, but he picks up on the repetitive nature of his own jokes and binge drinks in anger. He passes out and has a vision of himself in Jewish Heaven, where he meets Rodney Dangerfield. Rabbi Krustofsky then appears and reminds Krusty that Jews do not believe in Heaven, and thus he should do more to help others. An act of kindness does not seem to make Krusty happier, but Bart takes him to the synagogue, where Rabbi Krustofsky's favorite rabbi recites Krusty's jokes on religion. Krusty therefore deduces that his father did find him funny, and sees him again in Jewish Heaven, where Jesus turns Dangerfield's water into a Bloody Mary.

Meanwhile, triggered by the death of Krusty's father, Lisa becomes obsessed with protecting her own father, Homer, from getting injured. She wraps him in bubble wrap, which ends up saving his life when Otto's school bus plows into the garden. Homer admits that her concern saved his life, and Lisa is satisfied with having just a tiny bit of control.

== Production ==
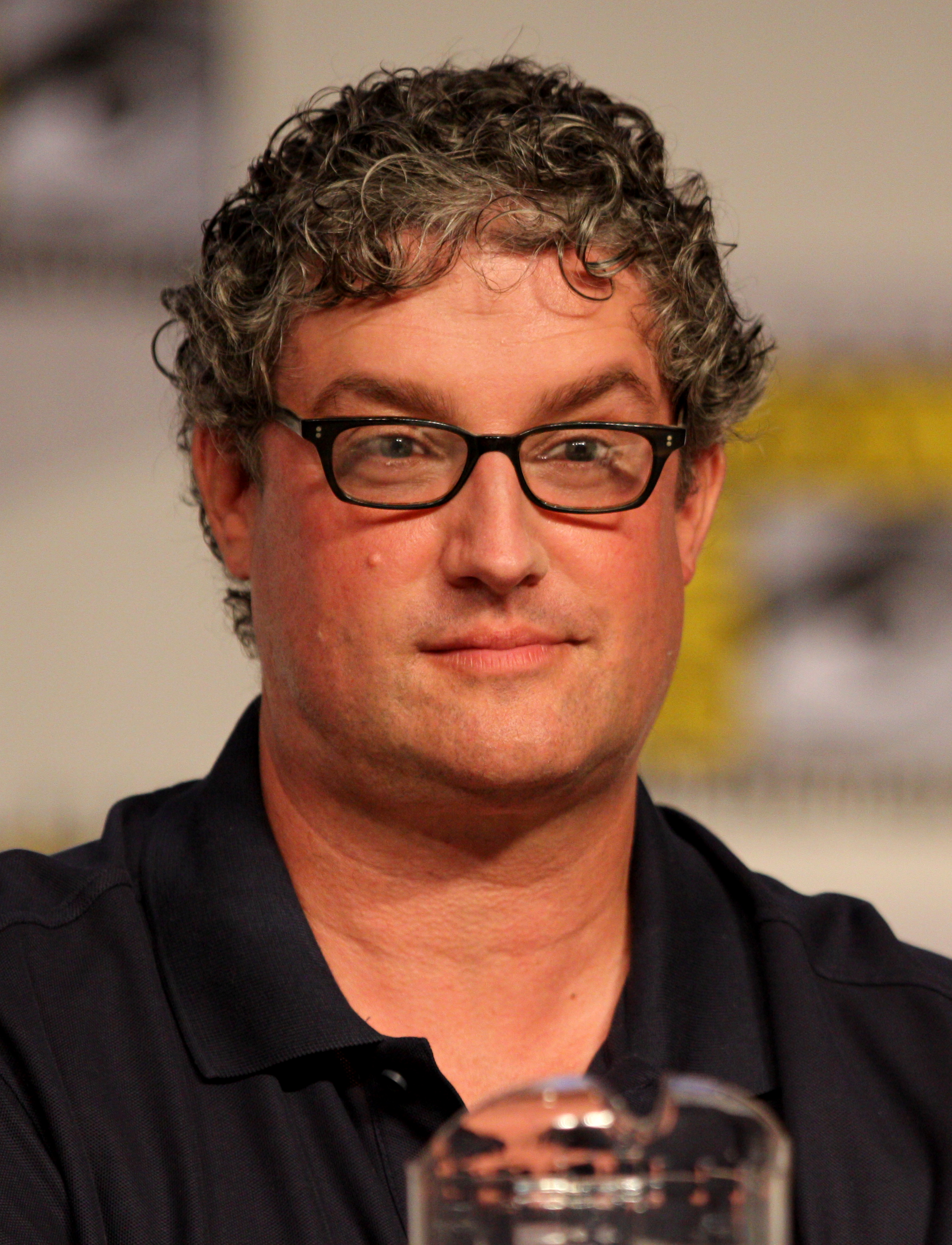
The Simpsons producer Al Jean made headlines when he revealed that a character would die in this episode.

In October 2013, in a conference to promote the 25th season of The Simpsons, producer Al Jean revealed that a major character would die in this episode. He stated that the character would have appeared more than twice in the show, and be voiced by an Emmy Award-winning voice actor who won an Emmy for the role as the character. Later that month, following the death of Marcia Wallace, it was confirmed that it would not be her character, Edna Krabappel. Voice actor Hank Azaria, whose roles include Apu Nahasapeemapetilon and Moe Szyslak, stated that it would not be one of his characters. It was shown at the 2014 Comic-Con that it would not be Homer, although there is a scene that features Lisa worrying about Homer's health as he struggles with a CPAP mask.

In July 2014, when Jean announced the title of the episode at the Television Critics Association summer tour, several news outlets suspected that Krusty the Clown would be killed off. Jean later told of his surprise at this theory, saying "I was like, 'What? "In the dumps" doesn't mean you're dead. It means you're sad.' I thought it was so obvious. I would be nuts to kill Krusty. Everybody loves that character". He said of the episode, "It turned out bigger than we thought it was going to be. It's not going to be this blood bath where they all get murdered."

Jean confirmed that the possibility was open for Jackie Mason to reprise his role as Rabbi Krustofski in dreams or flashbacks, and that Krusty would become a more generous character in the knowledge that his father admired his work. After the episode "Simpsorama" later on in the season, which implied that Ralph Wiggum would die in 2017, Jean told Entertainment Weekly that he had "learned [his] lesson" from the death of Rabbi Krustofski, therefore there would be no more deaths in the series. The first instance was in the 28th season episode "The Nightmare After Krustmas", aired in December 2016, Rabbi Krustofsky appears when Krusty has a near-death experience while being baptized in icy water for his conversion to Christianity. Jackie Mason continued to voice the character until his death on July 23, 2021.

In addition to Mason, the episode guest starred Jeff Ross and Sarah Silverman as themselves roasting Krusty. Maurice LaMarche voiced both a television critic and the late comedian Rodney Dangerfield, who had himself guest starred on the show in the 1996 episode "Burns, Baby Burns". Kelsey Grammer reprised his role as Sideshow Bob in a scene showing him arguing with his replacement on Krusty's show, Sideshow Mel. David Hyde Pierce, who had previously appeared as Bob's brother Cecil, had a cameo as himself acting in the role of Felix in The Odd Couple.

The episode's couch gag was the work of Academy Award-nominated surrealist animator Don Hertzfeldt, who was recommended to the show by Mike B. Anderson. It depicts Homer using a time-traveling remote control to regress to his original 1987 character model, then accidentally going into a distant future incarnation of the show called The Sampsans where he and his family have evolved into grotesque, mindless, catchphrase-spouting mutants. Jean deemed it "crazier than we thought" and "the most insane one we've ever done".

== Reception ==
=== Ratings ===
The episode originally aired on the Fox network in the United States on September 28, 2014. It was watched by approximately 8.53 million people during its original broadcast. It received a 3.9 Nielsen rating in the demographic for adults aged 18–49 (up thirty-four percent from the last season's premiere), and an eleven percent share. The Simpsons became the second highest-rated program in the 18–49 demographic on Fox that night, finishing with a higher rating than Brooklyn Nine-Nine but a lower rating than the Family Guy episode "The Simpsons Guy", a special hour-long crossover episode with The Simpsons. The Simpsons was, however, the most-watched show in the lineup in terms of total viewers.

=== Critical response ===
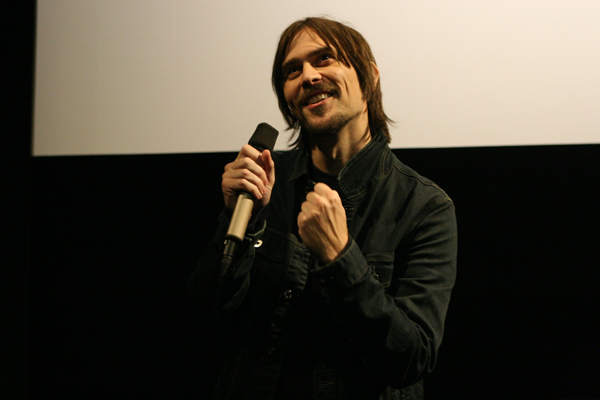
The couch gag by Don Hertzfeldt (pictured above) was praised as "staggering" by a CNN writer.

The episode polarized critical opinions. Carey Bodenheimer of CNN wrote that

Instead of dropping the mic and resting on its collective laurels, [The Simpsons] kicked off season 26 with a staggering, Don Hertzfeldt directed intro sequence and then went on to prove that, in a world where shows can flame out after just a few episodes, 'The Simpsons', which premiered in 1989 still has plenty of jokes left in their comedic arsenal.

Time wrote "If 'Clown in the Dumps' is not a classic on the level of season three's 'Like Father, Like Clown', it was still a fitting, sweet conclusion to the story of Hyman and Herschel". TV Fanatic gave the episode 4 out of 5 stars, writing "Simpsons Season 26 starts off with a bang, with plenty of laughs and even a few sentimental moments". Tony Sokol of Den of Geek gave the episode 4 stars out of 5, commenting

'Clown in the Dumps' may not be considered a classic episode now, but after a few years when we watch it again on syndication, probably next year on FXX, it will grow in stature. It is a heartfelt episode that does bring on the laughs. The sadness of the episode to me was Jackie Mason's voice, which sounds very tired.

Paste gave the episode a rating of 7.1, concluding

These days, The Simpsons can be hit or miss, and there was nothing to guarantee success from 'Clown in the Dumps'. However, even if the character death was perfunctory, and Rabbi Krustofski has made only a handful of appearances in over 550 episodes, it was still a funny, solid half hour of television. Nothing special—really, it was just another Krusty episode, and not the best Krusty episode. Nevertheless, the 26th season of The Simpsons has started out on somewhat of a high note. The good times keep on rolling for Matt Groening's deathless creation.

The A.V. Club gave the episode a C, commenting "Fresh off a summer of Simpsonsmania, thanks to the phenomenally successful FXX marathon of every episode ever, The Simpsons returns for its 26th season with a nondescript, anticlimactic premiere whose overstuffed cameos and would-be big character death amount to little more than a disspiriting confirmation that its best days are, indeed, long gone." IGN rated the episode 5.8, concluding "Between an anticlimactic death and a redundant conflict, The Simpsons didn't start Season 26 off on the right foot".

Executive producer Al Jean responded that the episode had been over-hyped, and that a quote attributed to him he never made: he said that he was quoted as saying that an "iconic" character would die, when in actuality, he said a "beloved" character would die.
