= Mark Kirkland =

American animator (born 1956)

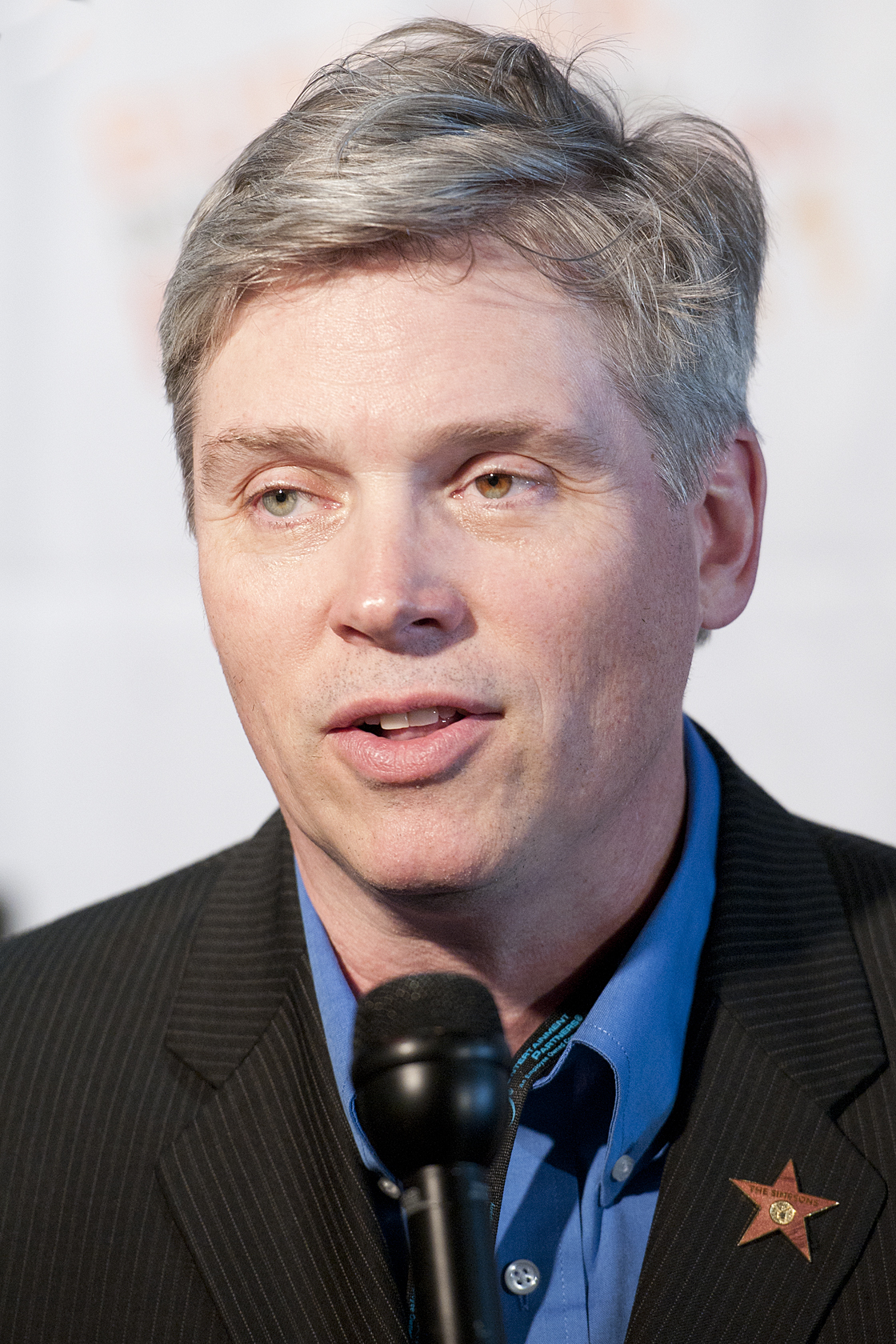
- Kirkland in 2011
- Born: 1956 or 1957 (age 68–69)
- Education: California Institute of the Arts (BFA)
- Occupation: Animation director
- Years active: 1978–present
- Known for: The Simpsons
- Website: www.mark-kirkland.com

Mark Kirkland (born 1956 or 1957) is an American animation director. He has directed 84 episodes of The Simpsons since 1990.

== Early life ==
At the age of 13, Kirkland began making super 8 films and working for his father, noted photographer and filmmaker Douglas Kirkland, creating “making of” films for major production companies. This exposure to Hollywood sparked Kirkland's desire to seek a career in the entertainment industry. Kirkland developed an interest in drawing at an early age. At the age of 17, he began studying in the Experimental Animation Program at the California Institute of the Arts for four years, earning a BFA degree in 1978. There, he was mentored by people such as Jules Engel (serving as his teaching assistant), A. Kendall O'Connor, Ollie Johnston and Morris "Mo" Gollub. In 1976, he won the Student Academy Award for animation along with fellow student, Richard Jefferies, for their graphically animated film made to the song "Fame" by David Bowie.

== Career ==
After finishing up his degree, he applied to Disney, but he was not accepted and instead began working for Hanna-Barbera. He began working on The Simpsons from season two onwards and has directed 84 episodes, more than any other director. In season 18, he became the show's supervising director,although he would relinquish this position to Mike B. Anderson as of season 20. In 2021, Kirkland left The Simpsons to become supervising director on HouseBroken.

Kirkland has won three Primetime Emmy Awards, two Environmental Media Awards and a Pioneer in Television Animation Award from the Burbank International Film Festival for his work on The Simpsons.

An active member of the Television Academy of Arts and Sciences, Kirkland served as the Animation Peer Group Governor from 2012 to 2013.

As an independent filmmaker, Kirkland has written, directed, and produced award-winning short films which have been shown at film festivals around the world and screened at the Museum of Modern Art in New York. During a 5-year period, Kirkland participated in 25 festivals screening his films: A Letter from Home, The Moving Picture Co. 1914, The Audition, and Bud's Odyssey. Kirkland is an accomplished still photographer whose images have been published in the US and People magazines. He created photo essays on the behind-the-scenes making of The Simpsons, and A Visit with Ollie about legendary Disney animator Ollie Johnston.

== HouseBroken episodes ==
Season 1

- "Who's a Good Girl?" (2021 - episode #1)

== The Simpsons episodes ==
Season 2

- "Dancin' Homer"
- "Bart Gets Hit by a Car"
- "Principal Charming"
- "The War of the Simpsons"

Season 3

- "Homer Defined"
- "Burns Verkaufen der Kraftwerk"
- "Homer Alone"
- "Colonel Homer"

Season 4

- "Kamp Krusty"
- "Lisa the Beauty Queen"
- "Lisa's First Word"
- "Last Exit to Springfield"

Season 5

- "Homer's Barbershop Quartet"
- "Marge on the Lam"
- "Homer and Apu"
- "Burns' Heir"

Season 6

- "Lisa's Rival"
- "Sideshow Bob Roberts"
- "Fear of Flying"
- "Homer vs. Patty and Selma"
- "The Springfield Connection"

Season 7

- "Lisa the Vegetarian"
- "Team Homer"
- "A Fish Called Selma"
- "Summer of 4 Ft. 2"

Season 8

- "The Homer They Fall"
- "Mountain of Madness"
- "The Old Man and the Lisa"

Season 9

- "Treehouse of Horror VIII" (as "Mad Dog Kirkland")
- "Bart Carny"
- "Girly Edition"

Season 10

- "The Wizard of Evergreen Terrace"
- "D'oh-in' in the Wind" (with Matthew Nastuk)
- "Marge Simpson in: 'Screaming Yellow Honkers'"
- "The Old Man and the 'C' Student"

Season 11

- "Brother's Little Helper"
- "Little Big Mom"
- "Pygmoelian"
- "Behind the Laughter"

Season 12

- "The Computer Wore Menace Shoes"
- "Simpson Safari"

Season 13

- "The Parent Rap"
- "Sweets and Sour Marge"
- "Gump Roast"

Season 14

- "Helter Shelter"
- "The Dad Who Knew Too Little"
- "Three Gays of the Condo"

Season 15

- "The Regina Monologues"
- "Diatribe of a Mad Housewife"
- "My Big Fat Geek Wedding"

Season 16

- "All's Fair in Oven War"
- "Mommie Beerest"
- "Don't Fear the Roofer"

Season 17

- "Bonfire of the Manatees"
- "The Italian Bob"
- "Kiss Kiss, Bang Bangalore"

Season 18

- "Moe'N'a Lisa"

Season 19

- "He Loves to Fly and He D'ohs"
- "That '90s Show"

Season 20

- "The Burns and the Bees"
- "No Loan Again, Naturally"

Season 21

- "Bart Gets a 'Z'"
- "Postcards from the Wedge"

Season 22

- "Elementary School Musical"
- "Homer the Father"
- "Homer Scissorhands"

Season 23

- "Replaceable You"
- "Politically Inept, with Homer Simpson"
- "Beware My Cheating Bart"

Season 24

- "Penny-Wiseguys"
- "Homer Goes to Prep School"
- "Dark Knight Court"

Season 25

- "Four Regrettings and a Funeral"
- "The Kid Is All Right"
- "You Don't Have to Live Like a Referee"

Season 26

- "Super Franchise Me"
- "I Won't Be Home for Christmas"
- "Peeping Mom"

Season 27

- "Love Is in the N2-O2-Ar-CO2-Ne-He-CH4"

Season 28

- "Fatzcarraldo"

Season 29

- "No Good Read Goes Unpunished"

Season 30

- "101 Mitigations"

Season 31

- "Hail to the Teeth"

== Interviews ==
Media	Episode	Date
Man vs. Art ManVsArt.com	Episode #54: Interview with 3 Time Emmy Award Winning Director of The Simpsons Mark Kirkland	2011-07-19
Actors Reporter (wiki) ActorsReporter.com	Exclusive Interview at home with Mark Kirkland, a director of The Simpsons	2011-07-07
Toon In! ToonInAnimation.net	Show #25: Mark Kirkland	2008-05-26
