= Jim Ignatowski =

- Taxi character
- First appearance: "Paper Marriage" (1978)
- Last appearance: "Simka's Monthlies" (1983)
- Portrayed by: Christopher Lloyd

In-universe information
- Nickname: Iggy
- Title: Reverend

The Reverend Jim "Iggy" Ignatowski is a fictional character in the 1970s television series Taxi. He was played by Christopher Lloyd. A gentle soul, Jim, in his own words, was "the living embodiment of the Sixties." His most noticeable character trait was his extremely "spaced out" behavior, a result of extensive drug use.

== Life ==
Ignatowski was born James Caldwell. He claimed to have been born in Spokane, Washington, although his often-unreliable memory leaves this information open to question. He was raised in Boston, Massachusetts as one of three children in a well-to-do family.

Jim's mother died when he was young, leaving Jim's father (later played by Victor Buono) to raise the family. (Jim states that while applying for his taxi driver's license that his father's name was Ignatowski—another example of his faulty memory.) While busy with his thriving urology practices, Dr. Caldwell left much of this task to various family servants. The father's absence seemed to affect all the Caldwell children in some way: Jim was an extremely uptight and humorless person before he became a drop-out; his brother Tom remained humorless and somewhat mean-spirited throughout adulthood; and his sister Lila exhibited marked nymphomania.

Jim was his father's favorite child. An excellent student, he attended Harvard, where he was a member of the Harvard Glee Club. After a party attended by his roommate Gordon Fog (played by Tom Hanks), his girlfriend Heather introduced him to "funny brownies" and persuaded him to partake. After ingesting these brownies, Jim was instantly transformed. His term paper on "Plutarch's Lives" was forgotten—in fact, by his second semester at Harvard, he was writing his term papers in fingerpaint. ("The typewriter seemed so impersonal", he explained.) Jim would become part of the counterculture, and was ordained as a minister with the Church of the Peaceful ("investigated and cleared of all charges"). Around this time, Jim changed his last name to Ignatowski, believing it was "Starchild" spelled backwards.

Jim is a genius with a childlike mind and a huge heart. This unseen aspect is commonly understood by the other characters as the consequence of long-term drug abuse. His genius appears at unpredictable times, such as during episode 20 of season 4, when, at a cocktail party, he agrees to fill in for an absent pianist and (after some comic moments) proves himself to be a virtuoso.

Jim was thrown out of the Democratic Convention in Chicago for stealing decorations, and attended Woodstock ("500,000 people... lucky for them I went or it would have only been 499,999"). He said he kept finding God everywhere—"he kept ditching me." He spent a year of his life making a macrame couch, and was once traded from his commune to another one for two goats and an unspecified Donovan album. Jim once claimed that instead of finding God or Nirvana through his 1960s experiences he has only been left with recurring flashback visions of the original Mouseketeers (especially Cubby) hatching out of seedpods.

== On the show ==
Reverend Jim's introduction to the crew at the Sunshine Cab Company was a guest appearance in Season 1, Episode 8, when he presided over a "paper marriage" between Latka Gravas, the cab company's immigrant mechanic (played by Andy Kaufman), and a prostitute, so Latka could stay in the United States. Jim appeared again in Season 2, Episode 3, "Reverend Jim: A Space Odyssey" in which he was first hired as a driver after drugging Louie De Palma, the head dispatcher (played by Danny DeVito). He became a regular on the show by episode 10. As the series progressed, the "Reverend" aspect of the character was less frequently mentioned.

Jim was an endless trove of eccentricities, most of which could be traced to his drug intake. He lived in a condemned building; bought a racehorse he renamed Gary (to erase his "slave name") and kept him in his living room; spent a considerable period of time trying to become the "perfect" cabbie only to spend all his earnings on a wall of TVs; and dismantled his van to build a castle for Elaine Nardo (played by Marilu Henner). He screamed in his sleep and thought weekends were nine days long because "we switched to the metric system." His drug expertise allowed him to identify the coca leaves (from which cocaine is made) in Latka's cookies—"Southern Peru, '74, before the rains"—much like a sommelier describing subtleties of wine. His heroes were St. Thomas Aquinas, Mahatma Gandhi, Alan Alda, and his dispatcher Louie De Palma, who treated him quite poorly and took advantage of him at every opportunity. Jim admitted to being a Trekkie, although he believed that the leader of the Romulans was portrayed incorrectly. His dream date, arranged by Latka and Latka's wife Simka (played by Carol Kane), was with Marcia Wallace. Jim was obsessed with her role on The Bob Newhart Show, so much so that he wrote lyrics for the opening theme that started "Here comes Bob and Carol..." Jim's favorite movie was E.T. In later episodes he wore an "E.T." button on his denim jacket.

At one point, his last known address was a 1963 Volkswagen. When his father died and left him $3.5 million, his family stepped in to keep him from receiving his inheritance. Ultimately, he was able to get his money, and (in season 5, episode 22) wound up buying the cabbies' favorite hangout, Mario's, and renaming it Jim's Mario's. Jim received a cassette in his father's will. It contained Stevie Wonder singing "You Are the Sunshine of My Life".

== Reception ==
In 1999, TV Guide ranked him number 32 on its "50 Greatest TV Characters of All Time" list.

Additionally, Christopher Lloyd received 2 Emmy awards for his portrayal.

== In other media ==
Christopher Lloyd reprised the role of Reverend Jim on The Simpsons episode "My Fare Lady".

In an episode of The Big Bang Theory (S10E10, "The Property Division Collision"), Sheldon rents his share of the apartment to an Ignatowski-like character, played by Lloyd, for $1 a day, prompting the new tenant to exclaim "It's like the forties again!"
