= Valentina L. Garza =

American television writer and producer

Valentina L. Garza is an American screenwriter and television producer, known for her work on both animated and live-action television series. She has written for The Simpsons, Jane the Virgin, Only Murders in the Building, XO, Kitty, and Wednesday.

== Career ==
Garza began her television career as a writers' assistant on Los Beltrán, a Spanish-language sitcom that aired on Telemundo and where she wrote her first episode of television. She then joined the Warner Bros. Television Group writer’s workshop and submitted a speculative script that earned her a writing position on The Simpsons. During her six-year tenure on the show, she wrote the episodes Loan-a Lisa, Opposites A-Frack and Four Great Women and a Manicure, the latter earning her an Annie Awards nomination. “Opposites A-Frack” won the 2015 Environmental Media Award for Television Episodic Comedy as it addressed environmental issues surrounding fracking. She later joined the writing staff of the animated series Bordertown and became a key contributor to Jane the Virgin on The CW. In 2018, her episode “Chapter Seventy-Eight” was honored along with “Chapter Eighty” with the Sentinel Award for their exemplary depiction of breast cancer in a comedic series. In 2019, Garza pitched and produced the pilot for a spin-off of Jane the Virgin, but the network ultimately declined to move forward with the project.

Garza worked as a consulting producer on Hulu’s comedy Only Murders in the Building and signed with WME in 2021 to develop original television content. She currently serves as executive producer and showrunner of the Netflix teen romance series X.O. Kitty which she joined after completing Season 2 of Wednesday as writer and co-executive producer.
