= The Musk Who Fell to Earth =

- The Simpsons episode
- Elon Musk (left) converses with Homer (right)
- Episode no.: Season 26; Episode 12
- Directed by: Matthew Nastuk
- Written by: Neil Campbell
- Production code: TABF04
- Original air date: January 25, 2015

Guest appearance
- Elon Musk as himself

Episode chronology
← Previous "Bart's New Friend"	Next → "Walking Big & Tall"
- The Simpsons season 26

"The Musk Who Fell to Earth" is the twelfth episode of the twenty-sixth season of the American animated television series The Simpsons, and the 564th overall episode of the series. The episode was directed by Matthew Nastuk and written by Neil Campbell. It first aired on the Fox network in the United States on January 25, 2015.

In this episode, Elon Musk comes to Springfield and convinces Mr. Burns to build a new power plant. When he learns it is losing money, Burns seeks revenge. Elon Musk guest starred as himself. While initial reviews were not positive, recent views on the episode have been overwhelmingly negative, with many ranking it as one of the worst episodes of the entire series, largely due to multiple controversies surrounding Musk in the years since its release.

== Plot ==
Nuclear technician Homer Simpson captures a bald eagle that destroyed the family's birdhouse and took his infant daughter Maggie, with the help of his son Bart and wife Marge. When he is about to kill it, his daughter Lisa advises that they nurse it back to health, which Homer agrees to do. When it is healed, they set it free, but it is killed by the flames produced by entrepreneur Elon Musk's (himself) spacecraft, which lands in the Simpsons' backyard. After Lisa introduces him to the Simpson family—who have no idea who he is—Musk asserts that he came to the Simpsons' hometown, Springfield, in search of inspiration for his work; Homer befriends him, and shows him the nuclear plant, his workplace. Homer's boss Mr. Burns (Harry Shearer) is impressed by Musk's cost-cutting inventions, and attempts to hire him, but Musk declines any payment for his help.

Springfield is now operated by self-driving cars developed by Musk and Burns, and Bart and Lisa joyride in one of them, crashing into the nuclear plant. They overhear that Springfield is losing over $50,000,000 per quarter, since Musk values bettering the world to gaining profit, prompting Burns to fire him. Burns announces major layoffs for the nuclear plant as a result, leading both to Homer's friends and coworkers being fired, and to Burns plotting to kill Musk. Homer is upset that his friends were fired, and is Marge advises him to cut ties with Musk. The next day, Musk and Homer discuss more ideas at the plant, and Burns tries to assassinate him with a gun, but the bullet hits Homer. Musk quickly saves him, and, although he is grateful, Homer states that their friendship must end. Musk flies off again, and, after saying his goodbyes to Homer, gifts the family a new, futuristic birdhouse. As he flies through space, Musk reminisces on his fond memories with Homer, and sheds a tear.

== Production ==
The episode was written by Neil Campbell, a freelance writer. It guest stars Elon Musk as himself. Executive producer Al Jean stated they tried to make the episode not a "kiss-ass" guest star turn, and the episode contains many jabs at Musk's perceived egotism. Musk was a fan of the series, having watched the show since attending university. He guest starred on the show because he and executive producer James L. Brooks had a meeting, after which Brooks was convinced he wanted a fictional version of Musk on the show.

== Reception ==
The episode received an audience of 3.29 million, making it the most watched show on Fox that night. Dennis Perkins of The A.V. Club gave the episode a C, saying "‘The Musk Who Fell to Earth’ plays out more like a love letter to Musk than a proper Simpsons episode. It's like some Simpsons writers met Musk at a TED talk, got smitten when they found out Musk was a fan, and turned an episode of the show over to him. Which would be less of a problem if the episode were well-thought-out and funny, Musk were an engaging comic presence, or the Simpsons themselves weren't relegated to supporting status on their own show."

In 2022, The Guardian said the episode was "perhaps the most fawning" of Musk's celebrity media cameos.

In November 2022 Musk claimed in a tweet that the episode correctly predicted his acquisition of Twitter, due to a scene where Lisa Simpson feeds birds that are in a birdhouse in Simpsons' backyard with a sign that reads "Home Tweet Home". In reality, this scene was not a direct reference to Twitter and occurs before Musk appears in the episode. Though it was also noted by The Independent that the subplot of Mr. Burns laying off a portion of the Springfield Power Plant's staff due to Musk, is similar to Musk's real life mass Twitter layoffs that occurred soon after his acquisition of the platform.
