= Matt Selman =

American writer and producer

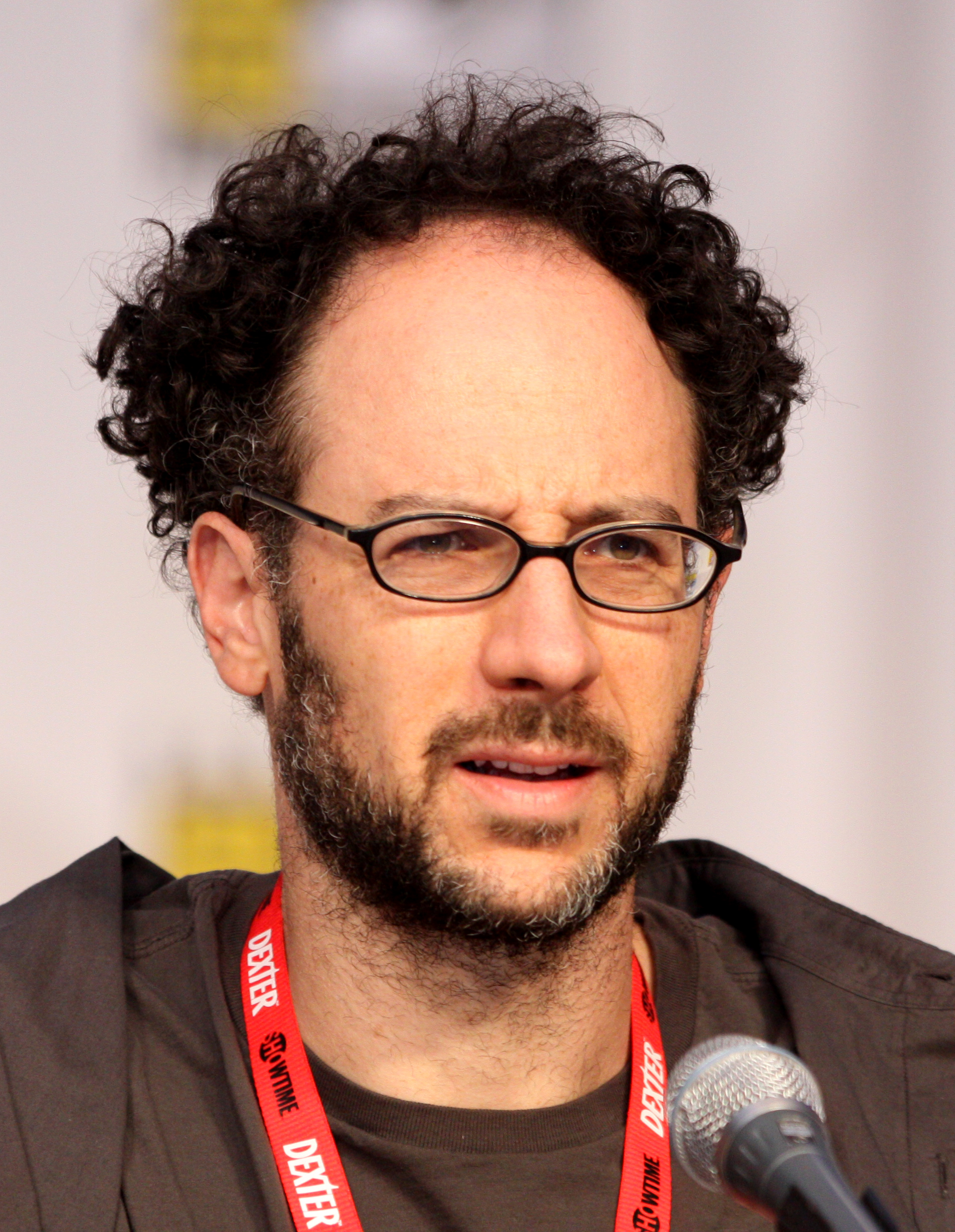
- Selman in 2010
- Born: 1971 or 1972 (age 54–55)
- Occupations: Television writer; producer
- Years active: 1990s–present
- Known for: The Simpsons

Matt Selman (born 1971 or 1972) is an American television writer and producer.

== Early life and education ==
Selman grew up in Watertown, Massachusetts. He is Jewish. He graduated from Beaver Country Day School in 1989 and the University of Pennsylvania in 1993.

== Career ==
=== The Simpsons ===
In 1997, Selman joined the writing staff of The Simpsons, where he has remained, rising to the position of executive producer. He has written or co-written 31 episodes of the show, including "Natural Born Kissers" which the show's creator Matt Groening listed as his eighth favorite episode in 2000, "Behind the Laughter", "Trilogy of Error", "Sky Police" and "The Food Wife". He also co-wrote the 2007 film adaptation of the show, as well as co-writing the video games The Simpsons: Road Rage, The Simpsons: Hit & Run and The Simpsons Game.

Selman has won six Primetime Emmy Awards for his work on the show, sharing them with the other producers. Selman received an Annie Award in 1999 for writing "Simpsons Bible Stories". He also won a Writers Guild of America Award in 2004 for writing the episode "The Dad Who Knew Too Little". In the episode, Homer's e-mail was said to be chunkylover53@aol.com. Selman registered the e-mail and received thousands of messages after the episode aired. He responded to some of them in the character of Homer, but gave up when he forgot the password.

Of his writing of The Simpsons, Selman said: "The hardest thing is we have to try and make each episode as good as everything that's come before it. We have a legacy of greatness, and you don't want to be the person that ruins The Simpsons."

=== Other work ===
Selman formerly wrote for Time.com's Techland "Nerd World" blog alongside Lev Grossman, and is also the creator and writer of the Icebox.com webtoon "Superhero Roommate." Selman also has written jokes for many animated movies. He appeared alongside Groening and voice actor Hank Azaria to judge on a The Simpsons-themed challenge on an episode of Top Chef: Masters in 2010.
