= The Kids Are All Fight =

- The Simpsons episode
- Episode no.: Season 26; Episode 19
- Directed by: Bob Anderson
- Written by: Rob LaZebnik
- Production code: TABF12
- Original air date: April 26, 2015

Episode features
- Chalkboard gag: "I will not pay my sister to do my punishment" (written by an annoyed Lisa, while Bart proudly watches)
- Couch gag: Repeat of The Game of Life couch gag from "Pay Pal", but instead of death threatening the Simpsons, it's Grampa. Background music is also added.

Episode chronology
← Previous "Peeping Mom"	Next → "Let's Go Fly a Coot"
- The Simpsons season 26

"The Kids Are All Fight" is the nineteenth episode of the twenty-sixth season of the American animated television series The Simpsons, and the 571st overall episode of the series. The episode was directed by Bob Anderson and written by Rob LaZebnik. It originally aired on the Fox network in the United States on April 26, 2015.

In this episode, the story of Bart and Lisa's sibling rivalry is told. The episode received positive reviews.

== Plot ==
Homer goes to Moe's Tavern with a new suit, but when he tries to pay for the beer, he finds out that his pocket is full of old things, including an old roll of film. Moe tells Homer that his bar is legally a darkroom and Homer decides to develop the film. After bringing the family, they realize why the film was never developed: because it was full of photos of young Bart and Lisa fighting. The kids ask how they started fighting each other all the time, and Marge tells them a story that took place six years ago in 2009, when Bart was 4 years old and Lisa was 2.

The pair go to a library to attend a storytelling session, only to start hitting each other with books and get expelled from the library. Later that night, Bart is scared because of his clown bed, and he does a doodle about the bed, but Lisa takes his pencil claiming he stole it, and shows him that she could write his name better than Bart himself. Bart gets angry and starts hitting her with a toy, but Homer sees that and strangles him. Bart smacks Homer over the head with a lampshade, making Marge disappointed. Frustrated about the kids to the point of having nightmares, Marge and Homer take them to a psychologist, who tells them that Lisa is smart and good while Bart is dim and evil. Back at the house, Ned Flanders decides to help them, arranging for Grandma Flanders to babysit the kids for them to enjoy a day without the kids, but they enjoy their day at the house, causing them to be late for brunch with the Flanders. At the Flanders house, Grandma Flanders appears to have died; leaving the kids unsupervised. Bart and Lisa try to go back home, but the door is locked. When they hear an ice cream truck, Bart takes his tricycle, and Lisa takes her pedal car to buy ice cream, but they get lost in Springfield.

Later, Ned finds his Grandma unconscious and the Simpsons children gone, much to Homer and Marge's despair. In the city, Bart goes into an alley, where he finds Kearney, Dolph and Jimbo. The bullies take his tricycle, but Lisa starts crying and they decide to leave them alone. At this moment, Bart realizes Lisa is smart and they make a good team. They then go to the Retirement Castle, where Grampa takes care of them. Homer and Marge try to find the kids desperately and eventually find them on top of the Springfield Tire Fire. Homer tries to bend a tree to save them, but the branch he is holding snaps, catapulting the kids back to the Simpsons' house into the clown bed, which falls apart.

Back in the present day, Marge expresses relief that Bart and Lisa got along since then, and they were able to have Maggie, inadvertently revealing to the kids that she previously used Maggie's bedroom to grow weed. Dr. Hibbert tells Ned his grandmother survived, and Moe calls Homer "Father of the Year."

== Production ==
A couch gag with the Simpson family climbing up an ice mountain and Maggie turning them into ice was released as a promotional image for this episode before appearing on the season 28 finale, "Dogtown." The episode was originally going to use that couch gag, but according to Al Jean, it was too short, so The Game of Life couch gag from season 25's "Pay Pal" was reused.

== Cultural references ==
- The title of the episode is a reference to The Who song "The Kids Are Alright". An alternate take of the song plays when the Simpsons look at the photos for the first time.
  - It might also be a reference to the 2010 film The Kids Are All Right.
  - This is the second episode to reference the song or film, the first being the Season 25 episode "The Kid is All Right".
- During the title screen gag, Professor Frink is wearing an armored flying suit like Iron Man from Marvel
- When Homer moves forward to strangle Bart, the music from Also sprach Zarathustra by Richard Strauss plays. This music was also famously used at a significant point in the 1968 film 2001: A Space Odyssey.
- When Homer finds an old undeveloped film, Carl tells him that all photo developing stores are now either knocked down or turned into deer blinds:
  - A camouflaged "Fotohut" is a reference to Fotomat, a retired chain of photo development drive-through kiosks.
  - "Circuit Circus" is a reference to Circuit City.
- When Moe asks Marge if she wanted the "Matte" finish, he signed one of the photos with Matt Groening's signature.
- If this episode aired in 2015, then the flashback took place in 2009 in real life terms. In the show's universe, however, the flashback took place in 1984, which was six years before the show started since Bart was 4 and Lisa was 2 during that year.
- The third photo in Moe's developer tray is Homer in a nude pregnant pose just like the one of Demi Moore in the magazine Vanity Fair.
- Young Bart and Lisa hit each other with copies of Jack and Jill and Goodnight Moon.
- During a flashback, Marge suddenly wakes up and tells Homer she had a nightmare in which she lost one of the children in a World's Fair. When Homer asks which fair, she replies "Brisbane '88". Marge is referring to World Expo 88 an event in Australia that achieved a very high attendance.

== Reception ==
The episode received a 1.5 rating and was watched by a total of 3.33 million people, making it the most watched show on Fox that night.

Dennis Perkins of The A.V. Club gave the episode a B−, saying "for all the various comic and satirical uses they’re put to, Bart and Lisa can still be effective as characters when the show reminds us that they’re still just kids."

Tony Sokol of Den of Geek gave the episode 3.5 out of 5 stars. He stated that the episode started strong with solid jokes but faded.
