= YOLO (The Simpsons) =

- The Simpsons episode
- Episode no.: Season 25; Episode 4
- Directed by: Mike Frank Polcino
- Written by: Michael Nobori
- Production code: RABF22
- Original air date: November 10, 2013

Guest appearances
- Jon Lovitz as Llewellyn Sinclair; Marcia Wallace as Edna Krabappel

Episode features
- Chalkboard gag: "My school schedule does not include a bye week" During the episode, a picture of Bart writing "I will not drop a stitch" is seen.
- Couch gag: Everyone (except Maggie) tries to get to the couch as if they are climbing from a different direction, but gravity is pulling them away. Homer fails and falls up through the ceiling into the sky.

Episode chronology
← Previous "Four Regrettings and a Funeral"	Next → "Labor Pains"
- The Simpsons season 25

"YOLO" is the fourth episode of the twenty-fifth season of the American animated television series The Simpsons and the 534th episode of the series overall. It originally aired on the Fox network in the United States on November 10, 2013. The episode was written by Michael Nobori and directed by Mike Frank Polcino.

In the episode, Marge invites an old pen pal to stay with Homer and cross items off his "to-do" list from when he was 10 years old, so that Homer can embrace his "You-Only-Live-Once" spirit. Meanwhile, Lisa starts an honor code for the school to combat cheating. Jon Lovitz guest starred as Llewellyn Sinclair. The episode received mixed reviews.

== Plot ==
Kirk Van Houten is going through a poorly-concealed midlife crisis and Homer is left in his own depression when Marge inadvertently ruins his mood by cheerfully telling him he will have the same job, family and experiences until he dies. Homer then shows Marge letters from his old Spanish pen pal, Eduardo, whom the young Homer wrote to for a school project because foreign pen pals required fewer letters from him than area prisoners. To cheer up Homer, Marge invites Eduardo to stay with the family. Eduardo arrives and helps Homer fulfill his childhood dreams, such as riding in the back of a fire truck, fighting The Pirates of Penzance, and re-enacting the battle of Captain Kirk and the Gorn from Star Trek using props from Comic Book Guy's store.

Homer decides to fulfill his last childhood dream: flying like Rocky the Flying Squirrel. Homer and Eduardo fly on a wingsuit and, after panicking, Homer is able to control his flying. Unfortunately, Homer crashes on the tallest building in Springfield and falls to the ground.

Meanwhile, Kent Brockman reveals that Springfield Elementary students are engaged in widespread cheating. Lisa proposes creating an honor code that will make students not cheat and turn any cheater in. Although every student declines at first, Lisa manages to get every student to sign the honor code by getting the most influential students to sign the honor code such as Nelson (the strongest kid), Martin (the smartest kid) and Milhouse (the class nerd), and after a few days Lisa's code begins to work as the students are studying much harder. Lisa accidentally grabs Bart's backpack and realizes that Bart is cheating. Lisa threatens to turn Bart in, but Bart checkmates her by smugly stating that if he gets caught cheating it will confirm her system is not working and destroy it.

Lisa plans to force Bart to turn himself in. Bart quickly declines and replies that the only thing that will make him turn himself in is a sign from God. Seconds later, Homer falls (following his earlier crash) and lands on Bart (followed by Homer's scream, since Homer himself landed faster than the speed of sound). Bart and Lisa see this as a sign from God, and Bart turns himself in, using the time to add more sections to the Detention Quilt.

As a thanks for helping him rediscover his spirit, Homer promises to drive Eduardo to the airport. After asking Eduardo where he wants to be dropped off, Eduardo tells him to "go as far as your heart will take you". Homer and Eduardo are last seen heading towards Sagrada Família in Barcelona.

== Cultural references ==
The couch gag is a parody of the 2013 film Gravity including a musical composition playing in the background that is similar to Spiegel im Spiegel by Arvo Pärt, which was the background music for the teaser trailer of the film. The building that Homer hits is similar to the Burj Khalifa, the world's tallest building.

== Reception ==
The episode received mixed reviews from critics.

Dennis Perkins of The A.V. Club gave the episode a B, saying, "Especially after the clutter and callousness of last week’s episode, that agreeable straightforwardness is most welcome, even if Homer’s quest isn’t particularly hilarious along the way. Part of the reason is that Eduardo’s not an especially distinctive character. As much as I admire Hank Azaria’s voice work, a charismatic guest voice (get Javier Bardem on the phone!) would have elevated him from the "Hank’s foreign guy" cipher he remained here. (I did however like Eduardo’s incongruous anger at Homer’s yearbook regrets: "Everyone has a bad yearbook story! They spelled my name wrong, get over it!") In addition, the episode pauses for some oddly poetic interludes (the couch gag, Homer’s skydiving adventure, the unexpected tag at the end) where the score and the images go for mood rather than hard laughs. It slows things down a bit, but if there’s a choice between seeing how happy and peaceful Homer is fulfilling his gliding dream (before, naturally, whamming face-first into the "stupid tallest building in Springfield") and seeing the show cram in a few cruel, pop culture gags (like last week), I’m fine with seeing the creators expand their canvas a little."

Teresa Lopez of TV Fanatic gave the episode two and a half stars, saying "In an effort to remain current, The Simpsons took on the popular (well, recently popular) phrase of "YOLO" this week. And you'd think it would be just a little exciting. The Simpsons Season 25 Episode 4 was, however, another mindless and dull installment of the long-running series."

The episode received a 1.8 rating and was watched by a total of 4.20 million people, making it the most watched show on Animation Domination that night.

Michael Nobori was nominated for a Writers Guild of America Award for Outstanding Writing in Animation at the 66th Writers Guild of America Awards for his script to this episode.
