= Specs and the City =

- The Simpsons episode
- Episode no.: Season 25; Episode 11
- Directed by: Lance Kramer
- Written by: Brian Kelley
- Production code: SABF06
- Original air date: January 26, 2014

Guest appearances
- Maurice LaMarche as Super Bowl XLVIII announcer; Will Lyman as himself

Episode features
- Couch gag: While getting ready to watch the Super Bowl, Homer finds that Bart has thrown his sixpack of beer onto an overhead power line. He climbs up and tries to retrieve it, but shocks himself repeatedly and causes a citywide power outage.

Episode chronology
← Previous "Married to the Blob"	Next → "Diggs"
- The Simpsons season 25

"Specs and the City" is the eleventh episode of the twenty-fifth season of the American animated television series The Simpsons and the 541st episode of the series. It premiered on the Fox network in the United States on January 26, 2014. The episode was written by Brian Kelley and directed by Lance Kramer. The original title of the episode was intended to be "I Only Have My Eyes for You," a take on "I Only Have Eyes for You," but was changed to "Specs and the City," a take on Sex and the City. The Oogle Goggles were originally known as "MyEyes."

In this episode, Homer receives a pair of smart glasses while Bart is forced to give a Valentine's Day card to Nelson. The episode received mixed reviews.

== Plot ==
During Christmas at the power plant, Mr. Burns hands out Oogle Goggles to his employees after Homer, Lenny and Carl discuss his previous terrible presents. Smithers is сoncerned with his boss's sudden kindness, but Burns reveals to him that he plans on using hidden cameras inside the goggles as part of a surveillance system to spy on his employees and prevent further theft at the plant.

In February, Marge encourages Bart and Lisa to join in the Valentine's Day festivities of making cards for everyone in the class. Bart does not want to give Nelson a valentine because Nelson is a bully, however, Marge shows Bart an amusing video the school had sent out with a kid who overdoses on candy hearts when he does not receive Valentine's Day cards. Bart then chooses a shoddy valentine from an old box for Nelson, but after seeing a line of frightened kids waiting to give Nelson a Valentine's card at school, a fed-up Bart confronts Nelson and angrily tears his card in half, leading Nelson to tell Bart he has one week to give him the best valentine ever or Nelson will kill him. Bart eventually gives Nelson a card based on fear of both the pressure of Valentine's Day and Nelson's psychotic actions, outrightly calling Nelson a crazy violent person who will someday be on Death Row; to everyone's shock and happiness, Nelson is moved by Bart's honesty and gives him a hug.

During Homer's snuggle time with Marge, he cannot take off his goggles, prompting Marge to walk out on him. The next morning, Homer decides to give up the goggles and places them on the lazy Susan to decide who takes them next. It lands on Maggie, but Marge grabs the goggles and puts them on herself. Homer appears at work without his goggles, but he soon realizes that he cannot live in a reality without them. Homer looks for goggles in Burns's office only to find the room empty and discover the employee surveillance system. He also sees Marge wearing his glasses and feeding Maggie ice cream which she had told him they had run out. Homer continues to watch Marge do her everyday errands, which includes visiting a therapist where she talks in detail about the infuriating behavior Homer displays every day. Based on advice from Moe, Homer sets up a fake appointment at the therapist's office to "bump into" Marge, but before he can do this he overhears her say that the therapy is her "reset button." Realizing that Marge always goes from being miserable on Tuesdays before her appointments to being absolutely happy and lively on the Wednesdays after them, Homer decides not to confront her. Later, Homer tells Marge she deserves to have her secrets, and they end up making love to the horror of the monitoring Burns.

== Couch gag ==
This episode's couch gag features an ident commissioned by the UK network Channel 4, in 2006 (though first aired in July 2007), for use before its broadcasts of Simpsons episodes. The writers added in all-new sections in order to theme the gag around the Super Bowl which was broadcast near the airing of this episode. In the original ident, Homer places his six-pack of Duff beer on a hammock in the Simpson's backyard. When he sits down, he inadvertently fires the six-pack into the sky, only for them to get caught on the power lines hanging over the garden. When Homer manages to get up to the beer cans, climbing up the family's garden tree, he is shocked by the electricity now running through the six-pack. He is continuously shocked as the camera pans up to a birds-eye view of Springfield. Every time Homer is shocked, an area loses power, which slowly start to make out the shape of the Channel 4 logo. In the updated couch gag version, Homer sits down to watch the Super Bowl, only to discover he has misplaced his six-pack of Duff. He discovers Bart has tossed it onto the overhead power line in the family backyard, and when Homer retrieves it, he is shocked. He continues to get shocked as the camera pans to a birds-eye view of Springfield until the town's power goes out (the Channel 4 logo is noticeable, but the power outages have been changed so it isn't as obvious).

== Reception ==
=== Critical response ===
Dennis Perkins of The A.V. Club gave the episode a C, characterizing it as "nondescript" and forgettable.

Tony Sokol of Den of Geek gave the episode 4 out of 5 stars. He stated that every line was funny with nothing forced. Sokol later ranked the episode as the seventh-best episode of the 2010s.

David Pierce of The Verge thought the episode was a "smart, nuanced take" on the usage of smart glasses. He pointed out the continuous commentary on privacy among the characters. He also highlighted the joke about the reduced attractiveness of the person wearing the glasses.

Lily Hay Newman of Slate stated that Homer's lack of inhibitions allowed for the exploration of what people would do with smart glasses. She pointed out how the episode depicts the corruption of the lack of privacy when Homer realizes he could spy on Marge. She also stated that Homer is made sympathetic when he learns to control those urges.

=== Viewing figures ===
The episode received a 1.7 rating and was watched by a total of 3.87 million people, making it the second most watched show on Animation Domination that night.

== Notes ==
1. This gag (not including the Super Bowl themed sections) was initially an ident commissioned by the UK television network Channel 4 and produced by Gracie Films. It has been used before many of the channel's broadcasts of the show between 2007 and 2015.
