= Yellow Subterfuge =

- The Simpsons episode
- Episode no.: Season 25; Episode 7
- Directed by: Bob Anderson
- Written by: Joel H. Cohen
- Production code: SABF02
- Original air date: December 8, 2013

Guest appearance
- Kevin Michael Richardson as Jamaican Krusty

Episode features
- Chalkboard gag: "I will not ask when Santa has time to go to the bathroom"
- Couch gag: The Simpsons are flailing tube man balloons on a used couch lot. Balloon Bart steals a pair of scissors and cuts Balloon Homer, who flies into some power lines.

Episode chronology
← Previous "The Kid Is All Right"	Next → "White Christmas Blues"
- The Simpsons season 25

"Yellow Subterfuge" is the seventh episode of the twenty-fifth season of the American animated television series The Simpsons and the 537th episode of the series. It originally aired on the Fox network in the United States on December 8, 2013. It was written by Joel H. Cohen and directed by Bob Anderson.

In the episode, when Principal Skinner promises that the most well-behaved at Springfield Elementary will get to ride in a submarine, Bart does everything possible to become a model student. Meanwhile, Krusty, on Lisa's advice, sells the foreign rights to his show in order to rake in more money, but the international Krustys' popularity soon outstrips his own. The episode received mixed reviews.

== Plot ==
Principal Skinner announces a school field trip in a submarine, but warns that only the best-behaved students will be allowed to go due to space limitations. If any student breaks a rule, they will be barred from going on the trip. Bart behaves well in order to remain eligible, but Skinner crosses him off the list after he accidentally tracks mud into the school. After Bart unsuccessfully attempts to curry Skinner's favor and trick Skinner into reinstating him by impersonating President Obama, Homer sees how upset Bart is and decides to help him get revenge on Skinner.

The next morning, Skinner finds his mother Agnes's corpse in the kitchen, stabbed to death. Homer and Bart soon discover the corpse despite Skinner's attempt to hide it, and Homer offers to clean up the mess and sends Skinner upstairs. Agnes stands up, uninjured and having taken part in the scheme, and Bart and Homer tell Skinner that the police are coming to arrest him. They provide him with a fake ID and a disguise and put him on a bus to Juarez, only to be shocked when he turns up at their house later that day. Skinner explains that he cannot run away from his crime, but also admits that he is probably glad to have killed Agnes. Marge and Agnes interrupt, having overheard this confession. Angered that Skinner had wanted her dead and the fact that he broke his promise to Bart for one minor infraction, Agnes decides to punish him further by being even meaner to Skinner by not taking the pills that keep her temper in check.

Meanwhile, Lisa learns that Krusty the Clown has gone bankrupt. She suggests that Krusty sell the foreign rights to his show; he does so, demanding a large percentage of the stars' earnings. The foreign shows quickly become more popular than his own, but instead of doing the right thing in allowing the stars to keep more of their money, Krusty tries to capitalize on their popularity by offering to do a guest shot on every show. This suggestion angers them so badly that Krusty and his agent are forced to flee on a golf cart.

== Reception ==
Dennis Perkins of The A.V. Club gave the episode a C+, saying "While there are a fair amount of laughs along the way, 'Yellow Subterfuge' is a rushed, ramshackle enterprise, livened up by some solid Skinner-work. Even Bart's teary breakdown to Homer that he had actually been trying to be good cribs liberally from the legendary "Bart Gets an F," one of the first episodes to hint at The Simpsons’ seemingly incongruous ability to wring genuine emotion from overtly silly situations. It's a damnably difficult balance to achieve—but the show used to be much better at it."

Tony Sokol of Den of Geek gave the episode 3.5 out of 5 stars. He stated that every line in the episode is either funny or setting one up.

The episode received a 3.1 rating and was watched by a total of 6.85 million people, making it the most watched show on Animation Domination that night.
