= Labor Pains (The Simpsons) =

- The Simpsons episode
- Episode no.: Season 25; Episode 5
- Directed by: Matthew Faughnan
- Written by: Mitch Glazer; Don Payne
- Production code: RABF19
- Original air date: November 17, 2013

Guest appearance
- Elisabeth Moss as Gretchen

Episode features
- Chalkboard gag: "Rocktober is not followed by Blowvember"
- Couch gag: A Simpsons take on the First Thanksgiving where the Simpsons (as Pilgrims) escape persecution by boarding the Mayflower (which looks like the simplistic sailboat that Marge painted for Homer) and sailing to Plymouth Couch, where an Indian (Apu) offers them Thanksgiving dinner for $19.95 a person.

Episode chronology
← Previous "YOLO"	Next → "The Kid Is All Right"
- The Simpsons season 25

"Labor Pains" is the fifth episode of the twenty-fifth season of the American animated television series The Simpsons and the 535th episode of the series. It originally aired on the Fox network in the United States on November 17, 2013. It was written by Mitch Glazer and Don Payne and directed by Matthew Faughnan.

In the episode, after a night of playing poker with Moe, Lenny, and Carl, Homer finds himself in an elevator with a young mother named Gretchen, who is in labor and needs someone to help her keep calm. Meanwhile, Lisa helps the local football cheerleading team unionize and negotiate for better wages and working conditions. Elisabeth Moss guest starred as Gretchen. The episode watched by 4.08 million people and received mixed reviews.

== Plot ==
While playing poker one night with Moe, Barney, Lenny and Carl, Homer has a run of good luck and decides to leave the game with his winnings. A pregnant woman, Gretchen, enters the elevator with him to ride down to street level, but it gets stuck between floors, and she goes into labor. Based on what he can recall of the childbirth classes he took with Marge, Homer manages to deliver the baby himself, a healthy son. Later, after another poker night, Homer comes across Gretchen again and learns that she named her child after him. He begins to spend time with her, bringing baby items that he and Marge never used for their children, instead of going to the poker game.

Marge, thinking that Homer has sneaked out of work in favor of the game, discovers that he is in Gretchen's apartment and thinks at first that he is being unfaithful to her. However, she eventually learns the whole truth, and Homer takes his children and Homer Jr. to the zoo. Homer Jr. keeps eating Maggie's ice cream, so she smacks him out of the stroller. In a fit of anger, Homer Jr. pushes Maggie's stroller toward a prairie dog exhibit, but she manages to stop herself before she can roll into it. Marge forbids Homer to see Gretchen ever again, and he takes Homer Jr. back to the apartment, where he returns the baby to Gretchen and her husband - recently returned from a military deployment overseas. A dejected Homer returns home, where Maggie gives him a doll to nurture and quickly forgives him for not paying attention to her, and Homer Jr. surprises his father with his ability (learned from Homer) to open and pour a beer.

Meanwhile, Lisa taunts Bart with the fact that Milhouse has invited her to a Springfield Atoms football game. During the halftime show, the team's cheerleaders, the Atomettes, invite Lisa onto the field to take part in one of their routines. Lisa enjoys herself when she is put in a suit exposing her belly button, and becomes a cheerleader, but after the game, she discovers that the Atomettes are poorly paid. She persuades them to go on strike in order to force the team owner to grant them a better contract; the strategy succeeds, but in the meantime they begin to endorse many bizarre products and services, to Lisa's surprise and dismay. As the credits begin, several Atomette-sponsored items are shown.

== Production ==
In April 2013, Vulture reported that Elisabeth Moss would guest star as a pregnant woman. Executive producer Al Jean said she would give birth in an elevator and name the baby Homer Jr. Moss felt insecure recording her lines because it was fast-paced, and she relied on the director and writers for her performance.

== Reception ==
Dennis Perkins of The A.V. Club gave the episode a C, saying "In the end, there’s no payoff to this storyline at all, except that Maggie seems to forgive Homer for neglecting her in favor of his new elevator family. (Her apparently customary daydream that Flanders is her dad changes to Homer while they hug.) It’s the sort of sweet emotional payoff a good Simpsons episode pulls off after building the story on a solid character foundation along the way. Maybe next week it'll be better."

Tony Sokol of Den of Geek gave the episode 4 out of 5 stars. He highlighted the situation of Homer helping someone give birth but forgetting to tell Marge about it. He also noted Maggie's jealousy of Homer Jr.

The episode received a 1.8 rating and was watched by a total of 4.08 million people, making it the second most watched show on Animation Domination that night.
