= Four Regrettings and a Funeral =

- The Simpsons episode
- Episode no.: Season 25; Episode 3
- Directed by: Mark Kirkland
- Written by: Marc Wilmore
- Production code: RABF18
- Original air date: November 3, 2013

Guest appearances
- Rachel Maddow as herself; Joe Namath as himself

Episode features
- Chalkboard gag: "We'll really miss you Mrs. K" (just one line)
- Couch gag: A parody of The Hobbit in which The Simpsons trek to the couch.

Episode chronology
← Previous "Treehouse of Horror XXIV"	Next → "YOLO"
- The Simpsons season 25

"Four Regrettings and a Funeral" is the third episode of the twenty-fifth season of the American animated television series The Simpsons and the 533rd episode of the series. It first aired on the Fox network in the United States on November 3, 2013. It was written by Marc Wilmore and directed by Mark Kirkland. The title is a spoof of Four Weddings and a Funeral.

In this episode, four Springfield residents think about their regrets at a funeral. Journalist Rachel Maddow and former football player Joe Namath guest starred as themselves. The episode received mixed reviews. For this episode, Harry Shearer won his first Emmy Award for Outstanding Character Voice-Over Performance.

The episode is dedicated in memory of Marcia Wallace (the voice of Edna Krabappel) who died on October 25, 2013. In addition, the chalkboard gag in the opening sequence was changed to read a single "We'll really miss you Mrs. K" as Bart looks on solemnly.

== Plot ==
Springfield resident Chip Davis (a man who never appeared on the show yet apparently greatly impacted everyone in some way) dies, prompting some of the people he knew to reflect on their own lives and choices. Homer regrets selling his Apple stock for a bowling ball, and becomes increasingly irritated that Mr. Burns is gloating about buying Homer's stock with successful results.

Marge worries that her listening to Kiss albums while pregnant with Bart made him what he is today as she watches him acting out during Chip Davis' funeral with Milhouse, including removing the church's pew kneelers, hurting everyone's knees when everyone kneels to pray, stealing the collection plates and using them as swords, and stealing Reverend Lovejoy's gown, mocking him.

Burns regrets breaking up with a French woman Lila who became a Buddhist nun after rejecting his engagement proposal due to his selfishness. He later finds her in a Buddhist temple, and the two reunite. He then goes to the bathroom to freshen up. But when he returns, he finds her dead in bed after taking too long to prepare. He tries resuscitating her, but his "breath of life" ends up disintegrating her body. Smithers then encourages Burns to honor the one wish she had for him: be selfless for at least five minutes. Mr. Burns then sets out to volunteer at the soup kitchen, where he ends up staying longer than five minutes.

Kent Brockman regrets not taking a position as a cable news anchorman when he had the chance when he was younger. He later goes to New York City looking for a job. After reviewing his choices, he heads to Fox News, where one anchor encourages him to blame the Democrats for what happens in the news. After realizing the pettiness of the news station, Kent decides to return home.

Later, Bart decides to fly after making a balloon ride out of a laundry basket and hundreds of balloons. However, he begins to regret his decision after ascending too high into the air. Kent then sees this and broadcasts it on the news in hopes of regaining his drive for local news. Homer then uses his bowling ball as a way of weighing down Bart's balloon ride by shooting it out of a cannon, which lands on the basket and brings Bart back to the ground. Everyone celebrates Bart's rescue while ignoring Lisa's success at an academics competition. Homer then begins to appreciate his bowling ball again, but then it explodes after a police sniper accidentally shoots it.

Before the credits roll, a tribute to Chip Davis is shown, depicting pictures of Chip inserted into notable moments from the show.

== Production ==
Following the death of recurring The Simpsons guest star Marcia Wallace, the episode acknowledged her death during the chalkboard gag. The producers planned to retire her character after all the remaining episodes that she had recorded had aired.

Television news program host Rachel Maddow guest starred as a fictionalized version of herself who used to work with Kent Brockman. Former American football player Joe Namath appeared as himself. He previously appeared in the ninth season episode "Bart Star." Writer Aaron Sorkin was reported to guest star in the episode, but he did not appear.

== Reception ==
=== Viewing figures ===
The episode received a 2.4/6 rating/share with adults 18–49, and was watched by a total of 5.43 million people, making it the most watched show on Animation Domination. The episode was down from the previous episode "Treehouse of Horror XXIV," which was watched by 6.42 million viewers and received a 3.0 rating.

=== Critical response ===
The episode received mixed reviews from critics.

Dennis Perkins of The A.V. Club gave the episode a C−, saying, "The callbacks and in-jokes engender nods of recognition but nothing like laughter. Krusty's the one who started the infamous Springfield Tire fire? Makes sense. Joe Namath is back for a one-line cameo? Sure—I remember when he was on the show that one time. There's just no snap to the jokes, if indeed they constitute jokes and not mere references."

Tony Sokol of Den of Geek gave the episode four out of five stars, saying, "The Simpsons mean to subvert all that is accepted as entertainment. They take on their own network, Kent Brockman has too much integrity to work at Fox News. They play with the media frenzy by teasing with the death of a beloved character and make someone up who fits the bill for the episode. When the Simpsons killed off Frank Grimes, it was one of the darkest episodes of situation comedy ever aired on television. It was also one of the funniest."

=== Awards and nominations ===
For this episode, Harry Shearer won his first Emmy Award for Outstanding Character Voice-Over Performance at the 66th Primetime Creative Arts Emmy Awards.
