= The Simpsons season 25 =

Season of television series

The Simpsons
- Season 25
- Digital purchase image featuring Apu Nahasapeemapetilon
- Showrunners: Matt Selman (3 episodes); Al Jean
- No. of episodes: 22

Release
- Original network: Fox
- Original release: September 29, 2013 – May 18, 2014

Season chronology
- ← Previous; Season 24 Next → Season 26

The twenty-fifth season of the American animated sitcom The Simpsons aired on Fox between September 29, 2013, and May 18, 2014. The season was produced by Gracie Films and 20th Century Fox Television. This was the second of two new seasons ordered by Fox. The primary showrunner for the season was Al Jean. In October 2013, the series was renewed for a twenty-sixth season.

This is Al Jean's 13th consecutive season as showrunner and 15th overall. Matt Groening, James L. Brooks, Matt Selman, and John Frink serve as executive producers. Executive producer Al Jean stated that Edna Krabappel was retired from the show following the death of Marcia Wallace on October 25, 2013.

In this season, Homer sells his Mapple stock to buy a bowling ball; Marge blames herself and Kiss for Bart's rebellious streak ("Four Regrettings and a Funeral"); Lisa becomes a cheerleader for Springfield's football team; and Homer delivers a baby ("Labor Pains"). Guest stars for this season include Judd Apatow, Will Arnett, Anderson Cooper, Harlan Ellison, Zach Galifianakis, Stan Lee, Eva Longoria, Rachel Maddow, Elisabeth Moss, Joe Namath, Daniel Radcliffe, Aaron Sorkin, Max von Sydow, Kristen Wiig, and Kelsey Grammer.

No episodes aired in February due to Fox airing the Super Bowl XLVIII, the 2014 Winter Olympics, the 2014 Daytona 500 and the 86th Academy Awards.

This season of The Simpsons won three Primetime Emmy Awards out of four nominations, including a Primetime Emmy Award for Character Voice-Over Performance to Harry Shearer, who was the last member of the main cast to earn the award. It also won one Writers Guild of America Award and was nominated for three others. It was also nominated for five Annie Awards.

== Voice cast & characters ==
=== Main cast ===
- Dan Castellaneta as Homer Simpson, Grampa Simpson, Krusty the Clown, Groundskeeper Willie, Barney Gumble, Kodos, Arnie Pye, Hans Moleman, Mayor Quimby, Rich Texan, Squeaky-Voiced Teen, Sideshow Mel, Itchy, Blue-Haired Lawyer, Smitty, The Leprechaun, Gil Gunderson, Louie, Santa's Little Helper, Mr. Teeny and various others
- Julie Kavner as Marge Simpson, Patty Bouvier and Selma Bouvier
- Nancy Cartwright as Bart Simpson, Ralph Wiggum, Nelson Muntz, Todd Flanders, Kearney Zzyzwicz, Database, Yellow Weasel and various others
- Yeardley Smith as Lisa Simpson
- Hank Azaria as Moe Szyslak, Chief Wiggum, Carl Carlson, Apu Nahasapeemapetilon, Comic Book Guy, Bumblebee Man, Dr. Nick Riviera, Wiseguy, Cletus Spuckler, Luigi Risotto, Dexter Colt, Professor Frink, Officer Lou, Kirk Van Houten, Superintendent Chalmers, Coach Krupt, Ron Rabinowitz, Duffman, Sea Captain, Disco Stu, Old Jewish Man, Snake, Julio, Legs, Drederick Tatum and various others
- Harry Shearer as Mr. Burns, Waylon Smithers, Ned Flanders, Dr. Hibbert, Principal Skinner, Kang, Lenny Leonard, Reverend Lovejoy, Kent Brockman, Jasper Beardly, Rainier Wolfcastle, Dewey Largo, Count Dracula, Otto Mann, Scratchy and various others

=== Supporting cast ===
- Pamela Hayden as Milhouse Van Houten, Rod Flanders, Jimbo Jones, Black Weasel and various others
- Tress MacNeille as Dr. Thurston, Agnes Skinner, Dolph Shapiro, Myra, Mrs. Muntz, Manjula Nahasapeemapetilon, Kumiko Albertson, Shauna Chalmers, Lunchlady Dora, Brandine Spuckler and various others
- Chris Edgerly as additional characters
- Maggie Roswell as Elizabeth Hoover, Luann Van Houten, Helen Lovejoy and various others
- Russi Taylor as Martin Prince, Wendell Borton, Sherri, Terri and Üter Zörker

Guest stars for the season included Marcia Wallace, Kristen Wiig, journalist Rachel Maddow, Elisabeth Moss, Eva Longoria, writer Harlan Ellison, comic book writer Stan Lee, Daniel Radcliffe, and Zach Galifianakis.

== Episodes ==
No. overall	No. in season	Title	Directed by	Written by	Original release date	Prod. code	U.S. viewers (millions)
531	1	"Homerland"	Bob Anderson	Stephanie Gillis	September 29, 2013	RABF20	6.37
Homer's personality has changed after attending a nuclear plant convention. Worried, Lisa calls the FBI, who sends an unhelpful agent with bipolar disorder. Believing he will cause a disaster, Lisa tries to stop Homer from destroying the plant, but he only intends to drive the workers away from the plant with a reeking smell. He reveals that he was brainwashed by hippies into becoming environmentally friendly. Lisa joins his cause, but they fail because the plant's air conditioning system is faulty. Homer quickly reverts to his normal behavior, which disappoints Lisa. Guest star: Kevin Michael Richardson and Kristen Wiig
532	2	"Treehouse of Horror XXIV"	Rob Oliver	Jeff Westbrook	October 6, 2013	RABF16	6.42
The twenty-fourth annual Simpsons Halloween episode features an opening directed by Guillermo del Toro and the following segments: "Oh, the Places You'll D'oh!": In this twisted parody of Dr. Seuss' children's books, Homer abducts Bart, Lisa, and Maggie and rides around Springfield wreaking havoc as "The Fat in the Hat". "Dead and Shoulders": In this parody of The Thing with Two Heads, after Bart is decapitated during a kite accident, his head is attached to Lisa's body and the two must live together as one -- until Bart discovers that he can fully function whenever Lisa is asleep, and sets out to incapacitate her so he can have her body. "Freaks, No Geeks": In this parody to the 1932 horror film, Freaks, Homer and Marge are circus performers (a strong man and a trapeze artist respectively) with Burnsum and Bailey, and Homer has a plan to marry Marge off to a circus freak (Moe) so he can rob him of an emerald ring.
533	3	"Four Regrettings and a Funeral"	Mark Kirkland	Marc Wilmore	November 3, 2013	RABF18	5.43
At the funeral of a beloved Springfielder, four residents remember events in their lives they would like to do over. Homer regrets selling his stock in Apple to buy a bowling ball. Mr. Burns bought the stock and became richer. Marge blames her taste in music for Bart's rebelliousness while he performs pranks at the funeral. Mr. Burns remembers the end of his relationship with a Parisienne who immediately dies when they are reunited. Kent Brockman regrets not taking a job as a cable news anchor. Later, Bart floats away in a basket attached to hundreds of balloons. Kent covers the story for the news. Homer rescues Bart by shooting his bowling ball into the basket, and its weight brings it to the ground. Guest star: Rachel Maddow and Joe Namath
534	4	"YOLO"	Mike Frank Polcino	Michael Nobori	November 10, 2013	RABF22	4.20
Marge invites an old pen pal to stay with Homer and cross items off his childhood wish list. His last wish is to fly like a flying squirrel. They build a wingsuit. When Homer flies, he hits Springfield's tallest building and falls towards the ground. Meanwhile, Lisa starts an honor code for the school to combat cheating. The students agree to it, but Lisa catches Bart cheating. He refuses to confess to the principal unless he sees a sign from God. Immediately, a falling Homer lands on Bart, which he thinks is a sign. He turns himself in and is given detention. Guest star: Jon Lovitz as Llewellyn Sinclair
535	5	"Labor Pains"	Matthew Faughnan	Don Payne & Mitchell H. Glazer	November 17, 2013	RABF19	4.08
After a night of playing poker with Moe, Lenny, and Carl, Homer finds himself in an elevator with a young mother named Gretchen, who is in labor and needs someone to help her keep calm. He helps her give birth to a boy, and she names him after Homer. He begins spending his poker nights with Gretchen and the baby until Marge finds out. Later, he takes Maggie and Homer Jr. to the zoo where Homer Jr. tries to hurt Maggie. Marge bans Homer from seeing Gretchen and Homer Jr. Taking him home, he finds Gretchen with her husband, who has returned from military deployment. Saddened, Homer goes home where Maggie comforts him. Meanwhile, Lisa helps the local football cheerleading team unionize and negotiate for better wages and working conditions. When they are successful, Lisa is concerned by the team's new endorsements of strange products. Guest star: Elisabeth Moss as Gretchen
536	6	"The Kid Is All Right"	Mark Kirkland	Tim Long	November 24, 2013	SABF02	6.78
Lisa makes friends with a new girl in school, who turns out to be a conservative Republican. They compete for class president with the local Republican party trying to support the new girl against her wishes. At the final debate, they agree to a truce and support whoever wins. The new girl wins in a close vote, but the exit poll says that more students agree with Lisa's views. Lisa is happy with the result even though it shows that the students do not like her. Guest star: Anderson Cooper as himself, Maurice LaMarche, and Eva Longoria as Isabel Guiterrez
537	7	"Yellow Subterfuge"	Bob Anderson	Joel H. Cohen	December 8, 2013	SABF04	6.85
When Principal Skinner promises that the most well-behaved at Springfield Elementary will get to ride in a submarine, Bart does everything possible to become a model student. When Bart is removed from consideration for accidentally dirtying the school, Homer helps Bart seek revenge. Skinner finds his mother, Agnes, stabbed to death and thinks he did it. Homer and Bart help him hide the body. They send him to Mexico, but he returns because he feels guilty and tells them he was glad to do it. Agnes, helping with their scheme, hears this and is angered, vowing to punish him. Meanwhile, Krusty, on Lisa's advice, sells the foreign rights to his show in order to rake in more money, but the international Krustys soon become more popular than the domestic one. When he offers to appear on the international shows for money, they chase him away. Guest star: Kevin Michael Richardson
538	8	"White Christmas Blues"	Steven Dean Moore	Don Payne	December 15, 2013	SABF01	8.48
Springfield becomes a tourist hotspot after an accident involving the nuclear plant and the Springfield tire fire causes snow to fall for the first time in a while. When Springfield's stores raise their prices, Marge cannot afford to pay for things, so she turns their house into a bed and breakfast for the out-of-towners. The guests complain about Marge's poor guest service, which annoys her. When Christmas comes, she is surprised when the guests sing Christmas carols to her. Meanwhile, Lisa buys gifts for the family intended to make her feel good. She gives a book to Bart, who burns it. Arguing with him, she realizes she was wrong. She sells the gift Bart gave her to buy a tablet computer for Bart.
539	9	"Steal This Episode"	Matthew Nastuk	J. Stewart Burns	January 5, 2014	SABF05	12.04
To combat the poor viewing atmosphere in movie theaters, Homer and Bart begin to illegally download movies and exhibit them in a makeshift theater in the backyard. Feeling guilty, Marge sends money and an apology letter to the studios, who call the FBI. Homer is arrested, and Marge admits it was her fault. At his trial, Homer passionately advocates for movie piracy, and the studios drop the charges in exchange for the rights to Homer's story. Before the movie is released, the townsfolk surprise Homer with a pirated exhibition, which angers Homer because he receives a percentage of the movie's profits. As they watch the movie in the theater, Bart and Lisa debate who was right. Guest star: Judd Apatow, Will Arnett, Rob Halford, Leslie Mann, Kevin Michael Richardson, Seth Rogen, Paul Rudd and Channing Tatum
540	10	"Married to the Blob"	Chris Clements	Tim Long	January 12, 2014	SABF03	4.83
At his store, Comic Book Guy is feeling lonely. When a Japanese manga artist, Kumiko, enters, he asks her out on a date. He asks Homer and Marge for dating advice. As their courtship advances, they move in together. When Homer meets Kumiko's father, he tells him about Comic Book Guy's worst qualities. This causes him to object to the relationship, saddening Kumiko. Marge forces Homer to fix it, so he takes Kumiko's father to a bar where they become intoxicated, and the father learns he is wrong. Comic Book Guy offers to get a job with his engineering degree, but Kumiko's father decides he approves of the relationship the way it is. Later, Comic Book Guy and Kumiko get married. Guest star: Harlan Ellison, Maurice LaMarche and Stan Lee
541	11	"Specs and the City"	Lance Kramer	Brian Kelley	January 26, 2014	SABF06	3.87
Mr. Burns gives his workers Google Glass-style computer glasses so he can spy on them. When Homer becomes addicted to using them, Homer gives the glasses to Marge. When he cannot live without them, he goes to Burns' office for another pair and discovers his surveillance system. He discovers that Marge has been going to therapy to discuss their life. He goes to confront her and overhears that Marge saying that always feels better after therapy, so he secretly leaves her alone. Meanwhile, Bart is forced to give every student a Valentine's Day card. Seeing Nelson bully everyone, Bart tears apart the card intended for him. Angered, Nelson forces him to give him the best Valentine ever. He gives Nelson a card, but tells him the horrible future in store for him. Nelson hugs him for his honesty. Guest star: Maurice LaMarche and Will Lyman
542	12	"Diggs"	Mike Frank Polcino	Dan Greaney & Allen Glazier	March 9, 2014	SABF08	2.69
When Bart is about to be attacked by bullies, a student named Diggs saves him with his falcon. He shows Bart the falconry club, and Bart learns to use the falcon to perform pranks. One day, Diggs jumps from a tree because he thinks people can fly. Digg is sent to a mental hospital, which saddens Bart. Later, in the falconry club, Diggs comes in claiming he has a day pass to participate in a falconry competition. He tells Bart that he plans to free the falcons at the contest. Bart helps him, and Diggs returns to the hospital after saying he will be there for a long time. Guest star: Daniel Radcliffe
543	13	"The Man Who Grew Too Much"	Matthew Schofield	Jeff Westbrook	March 9, 2014	SABF07	3.75
After researching genetically modified food, Lisa concluded they could be beneficial. A chemical engineering company invites the Lisa and her family to visit, and they discover that Sideshow Bob has become their chief scientist. Lisa and Bob bond over science and culture. Visiting a museum, Bob saves Lisa from being crushed by an exhibit. Bob reveals that he has modified his own DNA to increase his strength. He is at the museum to collect the DNA of the geniuses in the exhibits to increase his intellect. Bart comes and provokes Bob, and he chases them to Springfield Dam. When Lisa reasons with him, Bob feels regret. He tries to kill himself by jumping into the water, but his genetically enhanced gills save him. Meanwhile, Marge is forced to volunteer for a teen abstinence program. Performing poorly, she brings in Homer to say they have been abstaining. The thought of them having sex disgusts them enough to pledge to abstain. Guest star: Kelsey Grammer
544	14	"The Winter of His Content"	Chuck Sheetz	Kevin Curran	March 16, 2014	SABF09	4.02
When the Retirement Castle is closed for health violations, Marge invites Grampa and two other old people to live at the Simpsons' house. Homer learns to embrace their lifestyle, which annoys Marge. Meanwhile, Bart defends Nelson's decision to wear his mother's underwear, causing the other bullies to invite him to join them. They go to a bully summit. When the bully leader is attacked, they blame Bart, and the bullies run back to Springfield, but the other bullies are there waiting for them. Homer and the old people see them and defend Bart. This action changes Homer back to his old ways. Guest star: Kevin Michael Richardson
545	15	"The War of Art"	Steven Dean Moore	Rob LaZebnik	March 23, 2014	SABF10	3.98
The Simpsons' living room art is destroyed, and Marge buys a new painting at the Van Houtens' yard sale to replace it. She learns that the painting is valuable and wants to sell it. She wants to split the proceeds with the Van Houtens, but Homer wants to keep it all. Overhearing, Milhouse tells his parents. When someone else claims ownership at the painting's auction, they go to an island artist community where Kirk claims he bought it. Kirk's story is verified, but a forger says that he created the forgery sold to Kirk, so the painting is worthless. To settle their differences, Homer pays the forger for paintings for both the Simpsons and Van Houtens. Guest star: Max von Sydow
546	16	"You Don't Have to Live Like a Referee"	Mark Kirkland	Michael Price	March 30, 2014	SABF11	3.91
Springfield Elementary School holds a speech contest on the students' heroes. After Martin uses her first idea, Marie Curie, Lisa changes her speech to one on Homer. Lisa wins over the crowd and both kids' speeches are posted online. Lisa's goes viral, so much so that Homer is called to referee games in the World Cup in Brazil. Gangs and players try to bribe Homer, but he refuses because of Lisa. When Bart tells him that he was not Lisa's first choice, a saddened Homer begins to accept the bribes. At the World Cup Final, Lisa says his integrity makes Homer her real hero now. He decides not to fix the match for Brazil, which angers the gangs. As they try to kill Homer, Marge and a gangster's mother are able to make peace. Guest star: Andrés Cantor
547	17	"Luca$"	Chris Clements	Carolyn Omine	April 6, 2014	SABF12	4.30
Lisa saves a boy named Lucas from choking. He is a competitive eater. Lisa likes him and invites him to dinner. Patty and Selma compare him to Homer, and Marge is worried that he will ruin her future. She asks Homer to take Lisa to dinner and act gentlemanly so she loses interest in Lucas. Homer is insulted that Marge thinks Lisa marrying someone like Homer is bad. On the date, Marge interrupts to ask Homer for forgiveness. Later, Lucas gives up competitive eating to be a singer. Meanwhile, Bart helps Snake hide from the police. To thank him, Snake gifts Bart with stolen items. However, Milhouse finds his stolen tablet computer with Bart and helps the police arrest Snake. Bart tries to explain Snake's reasons for stealing to the police, but he has already escaped. Guest star: Zach Galifianakis
548	18	"Days of Future Future"	Bob Anderson	J. Stewart Burns	April 13, 2014	SABF13	3.64
A sequel to "Future-Drama" and a continuation of "Holidays of Future Passed," set 30 years from now. In this futuristic installment, Bart goes to a clinic to rid himself of his feelings for his ex-wife Jenda (who is now dating a xenomorph-esque alien named Jerry), Lisa must choose whether or not to cure her zombie husband Milhouse after he gets bitten by a homeless zombie. While Marge, after putting up with years of Homer dying and being cloned back to life by Professor Frink, loads Homer onto a flatscreen monitor and throws him out of the house. Guest star: Amy Poehler
549	19	"What to Expect When Bart's Expecting"	Matthew Nastuk	John Frink	April 27, 2014	SABF14	3.45
Bart makes a voodoo doll of his hippie art teacher when he gets sick of art class and cast a spell to make her sick. The next day, she announces she is pregnant. News spreads throughout town that Bart made someone pregnant, and couples come to make Bart perform the spell on them. Fat Tony kidnaps Bart and Homer and forces Bart to make a horse pregnant so he can have champion racehorses. They argue about how they ended up in this situation. Homer finds a male horse with which Fat Tony's horse is willing to mate. When it gets pregnant, they are freed. Guest star: Tavi Gevinson and Joe Mantegna
550	20	"Brick Like Me"	Matthew Nastuk	Brian Kelley	May 4, 2014	RABF21	4.39
In a Lego world, Homer wakes up and goes to the comic book store to pick up a Lego set for Lisa. Touching the Lego box, he has visions of a flesh world. Flesh Homer wants to enter a contest to build a Lego Springfield with Lisa, but Lisa wants to see a movie with her friends instead. While at the contest, flesh Homer wishes he was in a Lego world when a giant Lego set falls on him. Lego Homer realizes he is in a fantasy world, and Comic Book Guy says he can leave if he opens the box. Homer does not want to leave it until he realizes that he would not see his real family again. After battling Comic Book Guy, who wants to stay in the fantasy, Homer opens the box and returns to reality. Homer and Marge decide go the movies with Lisa and her friends.
551	21	"Pay Pal"	Mike Frank Polcino	David H. Steinberg	May 11, 2014	SABF15	3.66
Marge is worried when Lisa says that she is comfortable with having no friends. One day at school, Lisa meets a girl with the same interests as her. They become friends, but Bart is suspicious. He follows her and catches her accepting money from Marge. He tells Lisa, who angrily confronts Marge and refuses to forgive her. Eventually, Marge is reduced to tears, and Lisa decides to apologize. Later, the girl apologizes to Lisa and says she likes her, but Lisa immediately leaves when she says she likes eating meat. Guest star: Carl Kasell, John Oliver and Peter Sagal
552	22	"The Yellow Badge of Cowardge"	Timothy Bailey	Billy Kimball & Ian Maxtone-Graham	May 18, 2014	SABF18	3.28
Milhouse has been training for the annual "last day of school" race. Martin hears this and makes a bet with the bullies that Milhouse will win. During the race, Nelson punches Milhouse in the head and disables him. Bart sees this, but he continues to the finish line and wins. Because of his injury, Milhouse forgets what happened. At the victory ceremony, Milhouse regains his memory and tells everyone what Bart did, which angers the town. Meanwhile, Homer finds someone to put on a Fourth of July fireworks show. When the day comes, they get into an argument, and the fireworks shoot into the crowd. Bart finds a way to protect them and gives the credit to Milhouse. Guest star: Glenn Close and Edwin Moses

== Production ==
The season was ordered with the previous season in October 2011 after negotiating a new deal with the cast. Six episodes were holdovers from the previous season, and one continued to be held until next season. Executive producer Al Jean continued his role as primary showrunner, a role he had since the thirteenth season. Executive producer Matt Selman was also the showrunner for several episodes, a role he performed since the twenty-third season. Commenting on the series' longevity in its twenty-fifth season, Jean stated that the writer continue to generate ideas based on their own present-day lives as well as their childhoods in addition to current events.

This season featured the final performances by Marcia Wallace as Edna Krabappel prior to her death. In honor of her, the character was retired. It also featured the final episodes written by Don Payne prior to his death. As a tribute to both, Edna Krabappel and Payne were shown with halos and angel wings in the opening sequence for "White Christmas Blues." In addition, it featured the final episode written by Billy Kimball and Ian Maxtone-Graham before their departure from the series.

To promote the season, Jean stated that a recurring character would be dying. After the death of Wallace, Jean clarified that her death was not related to his prior statement. However, the episode featuring this event was held back and aired as the premiere of the twenty-sixth season.

For the 550th episode, the setting takes place mostly in a Lego world and is primarily composed of 3D animation. Production for the episode took two years, and producers needed approval from The Lego Group.

== Reception ==
=== Ratings ===
For the 2013–2014 television season, the season earned a 3.2 rating in the 18-49 demographic, which was the 32nd best performing show. It averaged 5.67 million viewers, which was the 81st best performing show.

=== Awards and nominations ===
At the 66th Primetime Creative Arts Emmy Awards, actor Harry Shearer won the award for Outstanding Character Voice-Over Performance for his work in "Four Regrettings and a Funeral." Color design director Dmitry Malanitchev and background designer Charles Ragins won awards for Outstanding Individual Achievement in Animation for their work in "Treehouse of Horror XXIV." In addition, Re-Recording Mixers Mark Linden and Tara A. Paul were nominated for an Outstanding Sound Mixing for their work in "Married to the Blob."

At the 67th Writers Guild of America Awards, writer Brian Kelley won the Writers Guild of America Award for Television: Animation for his script for "Brick Like Me." Writers Michael Nobori, J. Stewart Burns, and David Steinberg were also nominated for the same award for episodes written this season.

At the 41st Annie Awards, the episode "Treehouse of Horror XXIV" was nominated for Outstanding Achievement for Production Design and Outstanding Achievement for Storyboarding. At the 42nd Annie Awards, writers Tim Long and Rob LaZebnik were nominated for Outstanding Achievement for Writing, and guest animator Michał Socha was nominated for Best Animated Short Subject for his couch gag in "What to Expect When Bart's Expecting."
