= The Kid Is All Right =

- The Simpsons episode
- Episode no.: Season 25; Episode 6
- Directed by: Mark Kirkland
- Written by: Tim Long
- Production code: SABF04
- Original air date: November 24, 2013

Guest appearances
- Anderson Cooper as himself; Maurice LaMarche as John Kerry; Eva Longoria as Isabel Gutierrez

Episode features
- Couch gag: "MusicVille", a "Silly Simpsony" cartoon short featuring every character as a musical instrument. A parody of Disney's 1935 Silly Symphony short, Music Land.

Episode chronology
| ← Previous "Labor Pains" | Next → "Yellow Subterfuge" |
- The Simpsons season 25

"The Kid Is All Right" is the sixth episode of the twenty-fifth season of the American animated television series The Simpsons and the 536th episode of the series. It originally aired on the Fox network in the United States on November 24, 2013. It was written by Tim Long and directed by Mark Kirkland.

In the episode, Lisa makes friends with a new girl in school, who turns out to be a conservative Republican (a George W. Bush one rather than an Abraham Lincoln or Ronald Reagan one) with connections to Springfield's Republican Party. Maurice LaMarche and Eva Longoria guest starred. Journalist Anderson Cooper appeared as himself. The episode received mixed reviews.

== Plot ==
Lisa befriends a new student named Isabel Gutierrez. She is thrilled until Isabel reveals that she is a Republican (and to make matters worse, when Lisa asks her if she is a Lincoln or a Reagan Republican or even a George H. W. Bush Republican, Isabel says no). The two girls end up running against each other for class president, and the Springfield Republican Party tells Isabel they are thrilled with her decision and want to offer their services, as she is the kind of Latina voter the GOP will need in the future. However, Isabel tells them to butt out, because she is not going to be "owned" by them. The GOP decides to use some dirty tricks anyway, and Lisa is angry with Isabel when she thinks her classmate supported the actions.

Desperate, Lisa turns to Bart for assistance by issuing some smear-campaign tactics against Isabel, only for Lisa’s conscience to take hold once Bart shows her a video of Isabel falling off a bike that still uses training wheels and sobbing. In a class debate, Lisa tells the assembled students that if believing that those with a lot should help those with nothing makes her a liberal, then yes, she is a liberal and proud of it. At the final debate, the two walk away from their podia and Isabel says they want to set aside politics and would be happy for whichever of them wins, Lisa goes to say the same, and is cut off by Superintendent Chalmers, saying they are out of time. The election goes to Isabel in a close vote, but Lisa is extremely heartened by an exit poll that reveals 53% of the students agree with her views; she says that this means they do not like her, but would vote for someone who shares her ideas, and that is a happy end result.

The episode ends with Lisa (running on the Democratic-Robot-Zombie Collision) and Isabel (running as a Republican) at a presidential debate during the 2056 United States presidential election, with Lisa responding to Anderson Cooper's question about getting the United States out of the War in Afghanistan, by saying she would throw in the towel and make Afghanistan a state. An elderly Homer Simpson, who is watching the election on television, along with his Musicville counterpart, Hoba, proudly exclaims, "That's my girl".

== Production ==
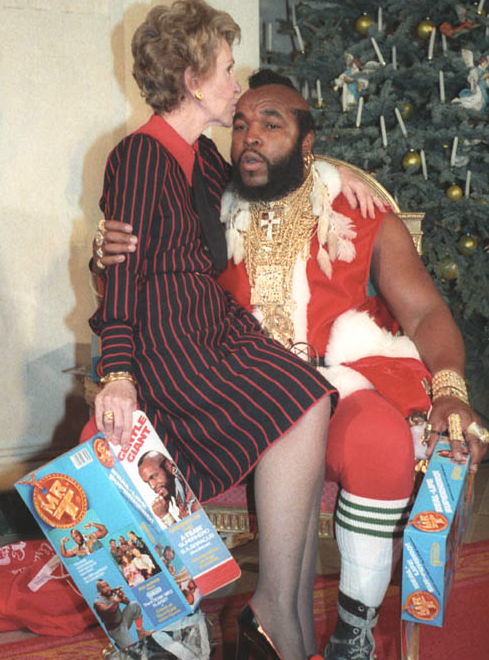
First Lady Nancy Reagan and Mr. T at the White House on December 12, 1983 was referenced within the episode.

In May 2013, TVLine reported that Anderson Cooper would appear as himself as a moderator in a presidential debate set in the future where Lisa is a candidate. In June 2013, TV Guide reported that Eva Longoria, a Democrat, would play Lisa's friend and rival as a student with equal intelligence as Lisa but with Republican political leanings.

== Reception ==
Dennis Perkins of The A.V. Club gave the episode a B−, saying "If there’s a bigger flaw with ‘The Kid Is All Right,’ it's that it's just not very funny. Longoria brings nothing to the table, and there's a dearth of quotable lines along the way. (Skinner's glee at seeing Lisa “thoroughly de-high-horsed” notwithstanding.) For most of its running time (there's no B-story), the episode seems content to let Lisa learn (and teach) a lesson in plain old Lisa Simpson decency, and I was strangely okay with that. As ever, Yeardley Smith imbues Lisa with genuine heart. Taking time out from its accelerating descent into gag-driven wackiness to engage in more character-based storytelling isn't necessarily a bad thing for The Simpsons."

Tony Sokol of Den of Geek gave the episode 3.5 out of 5 stars. He stated that the jokes were soft but the laughs were steady.

The episode received a 3.0 rating and was watched by a total of 6.78 million people, making it the most watched show on Animation Domination that night.
