= Brick Like Me =

- The Simpsons episode
- Promotional poster
- Episode no.: Season 25; Episode 20
- Directed by: Matthew Nastuk
- Written by: Brian Kelley
- Production code: RABF21
- Original air date: May 4, 2014

Episode chronology
| ← Previous "What to Expect When Bart's Expecting" | Next → "Pay Pal" |
- The Simpsons season 25

"Brick Like Me" is the twentieth episode of the twenty-fifth season of the American animated television series The Simpsons and the 550th episode of the series. It first aired on the Fox network in the United States on May 4, 2014. It was written by Brian Kelley and directed by Matthew Nastuk.

The episode features a mix of 2D and 3D computer animation. In the episode, Homer wakes up in an alternate reality where everyone and everything is made of Lego bricks, and he must figure his way out before he gets stuck in the plastic world forever. The episode received positive reviews, and writer Brian Kelley won the Writers Guild of America Award for Outstanding Writing in Animation at the 67th Writers Guild of America Awards for this episode.

== Plot ==
Homer awakens in a utopian Springfield where everything and everyone is made out of Lego (Maggie is a massive Duplo figure). While visiting the Lego Comic Book Guy's store to pick up a toy set for Lisa's birthday, Homer has a vision upon touching the box where he sees his normal flesh self giving the gift to Lisa and helping her build it, which disturbs Lego Homer. Although Lego Marge tells him it was just a dream, Homer begins to have hallucinations of being flesh-based everywhere he goes. Meanwhile, Lego Bart lets loose a skunk brought by Milhouse for "share day". While trying to search for the skunk, Bart accidentally destroys the school building, and Principal Skinner sentences him to rebuild the school, suppressing all creative attempts Bart makes at remodeling the building.

Homer continues to see himself and other Lego Springfieldians as ordinary people, which culminates with his hands turning into flesh while attending church for all to see. Going to the Android's Dungeon for answers, Homer touches the toy box again and has another vision of his flesh self building a Lego model of Springfield with Lisa for a Lego construct contest, elated that he has found a common interest with her. However, Lisa instead decides to go see the new Survival Games movie (a spoof of The Hunger Games) with older girls, forcing Homer to enter the contest by himself. As Homer wishes he could live in the Lego Springfield he created with her, where "everything fits together and no one gets hurt", Comic Book Guy's giant Lego construct of Kendah Wildwill (a parody of Katniss Everdeen from The Hunger Games) falls on Homer, knocking him unconscious. After being told by Lego Comic Book Guy that their world is a fantasy where Homer can live out his desire to spend time with Lisa forever, Homer accepts the false reality.

While playing with Lego Lisa, Homer realizes that he will never experience her or the rest of his family living out their lives, and decides he must return to reality. Homer returns to the Android's Dungeon and learns that opening the toy box will end his fantasy. However, Lego Comic Book Guy reveals himself as the part of Homer's psyche that prefers the Lego world over the real world. He proceeds to fortify his store and sets Lego pirates and ninjas on Homer to keep him from reaching the box. Hearing Homer's cries for help, Lego Bart builds a giant robot from various play-sets and takes down the pirates and ninjas before crashing onto the store. Homer finds the box in the rubble and opens it, changing back to his normal flesh self. He kisses Lego Marge goodbye before jumping into the box.

Homer regains consciousness at the Lego contest and reunites with Lisa, who had come after feeling bad about leaving him. He tells Lisa about his dream and the lessons he has learned about parenting. When Lisa starts to compare his dream to the plot of The Lego Movie, Homer quotes "No, this is a new plot" as life-sized constructs of the movie's characters Emmet Brickowski and Wyldstyle are carted in the background. Homer allows Lisa to see the Survival Games movie, telling her he cannot stop her from growing up. Soon after, Homer and Marge sit behind Lisa and her friends at The Survival Games, with Homer complaining about the movie while Marge enjoys it and repeatedly shushes him.

== Production ==
In an April 2014, interview with TV Guide, The Simpsons executive producer Matt Selman spoke about how long it took to produce the episode, saying: "We've literally been at this thing for two years — twice the time it takes to do one of our regular episodes — and that's way too long for comedy people to live with the same jokes. It's been an epic process. First, we had to convince [executive producer] Jim Brooks and our showrunner, Al Jean, that a Lego episode was a great idea and not just an excuse for our staff of nerds who grew up in the '70s to crack Lego jokes. There needed to be a real emotional story there." The Simpsons staff also had to have the approval of the Lego company. "We're pretty picky about how our brand is represented, and The Simpsons, which is so famous for its satire, has its own distinct point of view", said Jill Wilfert, the Lego Group's vice president of licensing and entertainment. "No one at the show is used to dealing with creative input from the outside, so there was certainly some back-and-forth to get it all right. But, at its core, the Lego brand is all about creativity and imagination. We respect that in others." Wilfert also spoke about how the episode is edgier than most Lego properties, saying that it was "a chance for us to be a little edgier than we might normally be. And because we'll likely bring younger viewers to The Simpsons, it was an opportunity for them to be more family-friendly."

The idea of the episode was conceived several years previous to airing, when the toy company approached Fox about producing a Lego set of the Simpsons' home, including minifigures of Homer, Marge, Bart, Lisa, Maggie and Ned Flanders, which went on sale in February 2014. While that merchandise was still in the works, Wilfert pitched the idea of a Lego couch gag: "We went to the guys at The Simpsons and said, 'Wouldn't it be fun if you did your opening couch sequence Lego-style?' They quickly came back to us and said, 'Forget the couch; let's do an entire episode!'" This also explains why this episode has no couch gag. The Simpsons show runner Al Jean also explained that the episode is not trying to copy The Lego Movie, saying: "None of us saw the movie until very late in the process — long after our story was set." Matt Selman added: "Any similarities are completely unintentional. We didn't even know there was a movie. Nobody at Lego told us about it until after the point of no return. But at the eleventh hour, we did manage to sneak in a little wink to the film." The episode's writer Brian Kelley spoke about how the episode's extensive CGI forced the staff to work in a whole new way, saying: "With this style of animation, everything needed to be locked in very early on, meaning we had to settle on our story and our jokes and commit to them with no room for screw-ups. On top of that, every character we used had to be built from a 3-D model, which took a lot of time and money."

Kelley also explained that a big church sequence in the episode gave the staff a chance to include all of Springfield's citizens, saying: "We pushed as much as we could to get everyone into those pews. We were like, 'More characters! More characters!' because we knew our audience would hate us if any of their favorites didn't get to be LEGOs. You won't see Señor Ding Dong or the Grumple, but I think we crammed in everyone else." Al Jean also spoke about how Lego and The Simpsons were an easy fit, saying: "But, in a way, the Lego-Simpsons is an even easier fit — and not just because our characters and their minifigures are both yellow. Both styles are similar and deceptive in their simplicity. When you get right down to it, Lego is just bricks, and Matt Groening's design for our characters is really just eyeballs and a few lines — easy enough for any kid to draw." Kelley also spoke about The Simpsons staff being big fans of LEGO, saying: "We are major Lego fans at The Simpsons, and the Lego master builders are huge fans of our show. It's been a fantastic, rewarding experience to pull this off together. After 550 episodes, we really need that shot in the arm. Now we're pushing ourselves for more big episodes. Onward and Upward!" Selman also said that no one on the staff took issue with the episode's tamer approach, saying: "Some of our episodes can get a little outrageous and push the envelope, but we would never want to be rude to our friends at Lego. Let the guys at South Park do their own Lego episode and go nuts. For us, it was all about sending a love letter."

== Reception ==
The episode received a 2.0 rating and was watched by a total of 4.39 million people, making it the second most watched show on Animation Domination that night, beating Bob's Burgers and American Dad!

Since its broadcast, "Brick Like Me" has received generally positive reviews from critics.

Jesse Schedeen of IGN gave it an 8.2/10 "Great" rating, saying, "The similarities to The Lego Movie are unfortunate, but there's still a lot of fun to be had in this latest Simpsons milestone episode. As long as this show has been on the air, any deviation from the norm is welcome. There's plenty of entertainment value in seeing a LEGO-ized Springfield and its blocky inhabitants. And the headier themes and story elements, if redundant at this point, should still connect with anyone who grew up playing with LEGOs. Now the only question is what the producers will cook up for a 600th episode celebration."

Dennis Perkins of The A.V. Club gave the episode an A−, saying "'Brick Like Me' is a miracle of an episode, a heartfelt, inventive, exquisitely performed, and tightly written half-hour that reinforces what I've been saying all season—there's no reason why The Simpsons can't be good again."

Tim Surette of TV.com said, "By the time Bart came out in his twisted mech suit and barfed out lightsabers, 'Brick Like Me' was just a grab bag of random pieces coming together in an effort to form something bigger—kind of like the handiwork of a kid who showed up late to a Lego party and didn't get his pick of the pieces so he built whatever he could from odds and ends. But visually, 'Brick Like Me' was a stunner, rebuilding Springfield in bright, brick-by-brick 3D, and that's what the episode will forever be known for."

James Poniewozik of Time gave the episode a positive review, saying "'Brick Like Me' demonstrates that The Simpsons still has it, at least sometimes. Afterward, you and the kids can pop in the season 3 DVD and compare. Or put together the Lego Simpsons' House–only $199.99, Brik-E-Mart not included."

Chris Morgan of Paste gave the episode an 8.6 out of 10, saying "This has been a fairly lackluster season of The Simpsons, and one expects that 25 seasons and 550 episodes will wear on you. This Lego episode could have been tone deaf and lazy, but instead it is far and away the best episode of this season, and one of the better episodes in recent memory. It's clever and visually impressive and, most importantly, quite humorous. This used to be a show that could make you laugh uproariously with frequency—without resorting to special event episodes. Maybe that isn't the case so much anymore, but there is still the capacity for top-notch television floating somewhere in The Simpsons universe."

Tony Sokol of Den of Geek gave the episode four and a half stars out of five, saying "So, I came in wary but no, it's a good payoff. Not jam-packed with jokes this time, but no misfires. On a show like The Simpsons, as long as it's been running and with so many jokes packed per animated cell, we forgive a lot of misfired jokes. Overall, the balance is always tilted toward funny and they didn't lose their subversive core. 'Brick Like Me' has no groaners. It will be considered a classic, yeah. Not my favorite classic, but it is already memorable, lest I forget, and satisfying. In five years, fans will instantly recognize 'the Lego episode.' It was strangely exhilarating. Everything fit and no one got hurt." In 2023, Sokol named this episode the tenth-best episode of The Simpsons from the 2010s.

Screen Rant called it the best episode of the 25th season.

In 2014, Vulture named the episode the 51st best episode of The Simpsons to stream. In 2019, a new ranking from Vulture gave it the same rank.

Brian Kelley won the Writers Guild of America Award for Outstanding Writing in Animation at the 67th Writers Guild of America Awards for his script to this episode.
