= Treehouse of Horror XXIV =

- The Simpsons episode
- Promotional poster
- Episode no.: Season 25; Episode 2
- Directed by: Rob Oliver; Guillermo del Toro (only opening sequence)
- Written by: Jeff Westbrook
- Production code: RABF16
- Original air date: October 6, 2013

Episode features
- Chalkboard gag: "All work and no play makes Jack a dull boy" (written on the blackboard by Bart and scrawled on the walls by a deranged Stephen King)
- Couch gag: A horror-themed opening directed by Guillermo del Toro, featuring classic and contemporary horror, and science fiction monsters and movie references, ending with Lisa falling through a hole à la Alice in Wonderland and ending up in the end sequence to del Toro's Pan's Labyrinth.

Episode chronology
← Previous "Homerland"	Next → "Four Regrettings and a Funeral"
- The Simpsons season 25

"Treehouse of Horror XXIV" is the second episode of the twenty-fifth season of the American animated television series The Simpsons, the 24th episode in the Treehouse of Horror series of Halloween specials, and the 532nd episode of the series. It originally aired on the Fox network in the United States on October 6, 2013. The episode was written by Jeff Westbrook and directed by Rob Oliver.

In this episode, Homer abducts his children to cause chaos around town, Bart's head is attached to Lisa, and Homer and Marge are circus performers. Guillermo del Toro directed the opening sequence. The episode received positive reviews. Animators Dmitry Malanitchev and Charles Ragins received Emmy Awards for Outstanding Individual Achievement in Animation for this episode.

== Plot ==
=== Opening sequence ===
The episode's opening, conceived by film director Guillermo del Toro, is a mash-up of horror movies, science fiction films, and TV shows including all of del Toro's own films:

- A large three-eyed raven flies past the show's logo and gets reduced to a skeleton.
- Mutated Springfield citizens swarm the Nuclear Power Plant.
- In the background are a Mecha and a Kaiju from Pacific Rim fighting as the three-eyed raven's skeleton crashes to the ground.
- The Lard Lad statue comes to life and is eaten by Chief Wiggum's Cyclops form that resembles the version seen in The 7th Voyage of Sinbad.
- Alfred Hitchcock is feeding some birds who attack Edna Krabappel.
- Bart Simpson writes "All Work and No Play Makes Jack a Dull Boy" from The Shining as he flees from Stephen King.
- As Bart skateboards away, he lands on a leaves raked up by a Hellboy version of Groundskeeper Willie where Karl Ruprect Kroenen was underneath as they fight.
- Homer mutates into a Reaper from Blade II as Carl dons his Blade attire.
- Skeletons of the original models of the Simpsons from The Tracey Ullman Show and Godzilla are underground.
- Mr. Burns is the Pale Man from Pan's Labyrinth as a pixie version of Waylon Smithers polishes has hand eyes. Then Mr. Burns eats him.
- The scarabs from Cronos are seen in the checkout as a Judas breed version of Marge buys Maggie.
- Dewey Largo is dressed as the Phantom of the Paradise conducting different incarnations of the Phantom of the Opera like the classic version from original novel, the Lon Chaney version from the 1925 film, the Claude Rains version from 1943 film, and the Herbert Lom version from the 1962 film. Lisa plays her saxophone before leaving in the usual manner.
- Bart dodges the tentacles of Cthulhu on his skateboard as he passes by H.P. Lovecraft, Edgar Allan Poe (holding up the three-eyed raven), Ray Bradbury (who is adding tattoos to The Illustrated Man), Richard Matheson (who is standing next to a hooded robed figure in dark glasses), and a mutant from The Omega Man before joining his fellow civilians in fleeing from a horde of angry monsters consisting of Count Dracula, Frankenstein's monster, the Bride of Frankenstein, Larry Talbot's werewolf form, the Mummy of Amenhotep from "Treehouse of Horror XX", the Gill-man, the Invisible Man, and the Metaluna Mutant from This Island Earth.
- Maggie drives the killer Sedan from The Car.
- Rod Serling, Robby the Robot from Forbidden Planet, an unidentified creature from Hellboy II: The Golden Army, the Xenomorph, the Man in the Beaver Hat from London After Midnight, a mole from The Mole People, a Morlock from The Time Machine, Hans Moleman drawing Hitchcock's line drawing from Alfred Hitchcock Presents, the skeletons from Jason and the Argonauts, Ymir from 20 Million Miles to Earth, an object from The First Man in the Moon colliding with Kang and Kodos's ship, two aliens from Invasion of the Saucer Men, The Thing from Another World, Gort and the flying saucer from The Day the Earth Stood Still, Count Orlok, Brundlefly from The Fly, Schlitzie from Freaks, the Mummy of Amenhotep, the Invisible Man, the Creeper from House of Horrors and its prequel The Brute Man, and the Grim Reaper are seen in the field near the Simpson family's house.
- The opening sequence ends with Lisa falling through the couch, dressed as Alice from Alice in Wonderland, and getting brainwashed by the Hypnotoad from Futurama, then happening upon a palace room in a send-up of the end of Pan's Labyrinth.

=== Oh, the Places You'll D'oh! ===
It is Halloween night in a Dr. Seuss-type take on Springfield. The Simpson children are home with the mumps and unable to go trick-or-treating with the other kids. Once their mother, Marge (in a Catwoman costume that every other woman — and Comic Book Guy, who wore it, not knowing it's Halloween — is wearing), leaves for a costume party, they are visited by The Fat in the Hat, who gives them vaccinations so he can take them out to get candy for them and beer for him. However, while helping the children get their treats, he also takes them on a casual rampage of death and destruction: blowing up the mansion of Mr. Burns (depicted as a buzzard) before killing him and serving his cooked corpse to a homeless shelter; robbing Moe at his own place (where the Halloween buffet their father, Homer, attends is hosted), skinning him and using his flayed skin as a "Thnord"; robbing Apu and forcing him to spend time with his wife and octuplets; killing the Twrinches (Patty and Selma) at their DMV workplace and tossing car licenses to people waiting in line; blowing up town hall while wearing a Guy Fawkes mask to protest a soda ban; setting animals free from the zoo, and committing "aggravated floop-fluffel-cide", with Ralph Wiggum as one of his victims. Alarmed at these events, the children manage to elude him with the aid of several monstrous animals; a "Three-Humped Gumbammel" (a Barney Gumble-esque camel who is real fast and humble, doesn't take tips and is never a grumbler), a "Krustiferous Krumbull" (a Krusty-esque bull who ends up being beheaded by a matador Sideshow Bob) and, finally, the Spanish-speaking "Bee-Man of Bumble" (a human-sized Bumblebee Man-esque bee with multicolored stripes on his body). However, the Fat is waiting inside for them when they get home and gloats that he will never leave them right before Maggie stabs the Fat in the chest with his own umbrella. The Fat then dies with the words, "I'm frightened of nothing, not even Hell-fires. Just don't let me ever be played by Mike Myers." Marge comes home, unaware of what happened, and the children fake their mumps on the sofa by stuffing the collected candy in their mouths and have turned the Fat into a petticoat-like carpet. The segment then ends with a slide saying that the Fat will eventually return in the fictitious sequel, "The Fat in The Hat Pledges a Frat".

=== Dead and Shoulders ===
When Bart ties the string of his box kite around his neck, Arnie Pye flies by and ultimately hits it, thus causing Bart's head to slice off, afterwards, Bart's head is surgically attached to Lisa's body in order to extend Bart's life and cut Lisa's short. Though the two eventually get along, Bart learns that he can control Lisa's body while she is unconscious and resolves to get rid of her to have total control. Unfortunately, the attempt at a sawmill results in Bart's head being transferred to Selma's body while Lisa's head is grafted onto Krusty.

=== Freaks, No Geeks ===
In a circus in the 1930s, the self-serving strongman Homer gets his lover trapeze artist Marge to marry sideshow freak Moe after learning of the emerald ring he inherited from his mother on her death bed. At their wedding reception, the other "freaks" announce that they accept Marge in spite of her being a "normal" outsider (even though Marge claims she is a freak because she has one blue eye and one pale brown eye). After finding Homer attempting to poison Moe's wedding wine glass, an angry Marge sends him away, and Homer is cornered by the freaks with weapons as they advance on him with the intention to mutilate him into a duck humanoid, who is ought to be like them. The scene then cuts to the present, where it is revealed that the whole story was told by this version of Homer of how he met Marge; revealing that she took him back soon after the incident. An epilogue is shown during the credits, revealing that Homer continued his career as the world's strongest duck until his death.

== Production ==
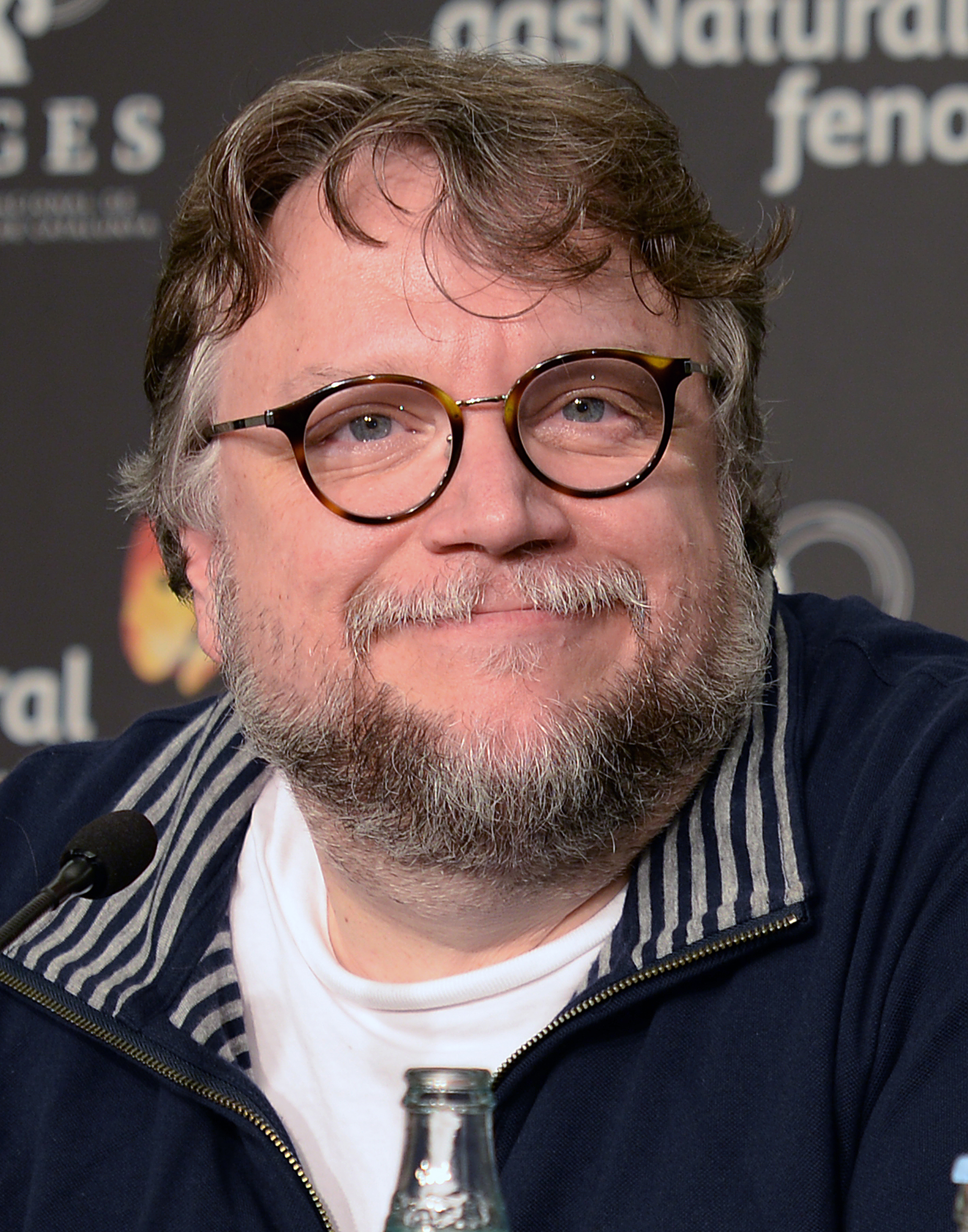
Guillermo del Toro guest directed the opening sequence for this episode

In October 2013, in an interview with Entertainment Weekly, Guillermo del Toro spoke about directing the opening of the episode, saying: "The Simpsons titles are so iconic and yet they've never been riffed in this vein. I really wanted to land the connections between the [show's] set pieces and the titles and some of the most iconic horror movies, and intersperse them with some of my stuff in there for pure joy." He also explained he was inspired by MAD magazine: "They would try to cram so many references in. You as a kid could spend an afternoon on your bed with your magnifying glass going through a frame of MAD magazine and finding all these references to this and that."

== Cultural references ==
The show’s opening sequence contains references to many movies and series, such as The Birds, Blade II, Hellboy, American Horror Story, Nosferatu: A Symphony of Horror, The Car, The Universal Monsters, and The Shining.

"Oh, the Places You'll D'oh!" is a spoof of the Dr. Seuss book The Cat in the Hat, while the title is a parody of the title of another Dr. Seuss book, Oh, the Places You'll Go!. A character called the Bore-ax (a spoof of another Seuss character, The Lorax) makes an appearance in the episode, where he is seen promoting consumer goods, despite his message of not harming the environment. Marge goes to attend a Halloween party in a Catwoman costume. Whilst taking the children out to get treats, the Fat blows up the town hall wearing a Guy Fawkes mask, a reference to the 2005 film V for Vendetta. When Homer, as the cat, is killed, he requests that he not be portrayed by actor Mike Myers - a reference to the 2003 Cat in the Hat film.

"Dead and Shoulders" borrows the premise of the 1972 movie The Thing with Two Heads, which starred Ray Milland and Rosey Grier. At the end of "Dead and Shoulders" and at the beginning of "Freaks, No Geeks", Selma makes Bart help her sing "Mockingbird" from the 1994 comedy Dumb and Dumber. It is also implied that Lisa is a fan of the My Little Pony: Friendship Is Magic character Rainbow Dash. She talks in her sleep saying "Rainbow, oh Rainbow!", to which Bart responds "Oh no, not the pony dream again!".

"Freaks, No Geeks" is a parody of the 1932 horror film Freaks. At the end of the third story, a mutilated duck creature Homer is seen telling his children that was how he met their mother, which leads into the theme song from the series How I Met Your Mother.

== Reception ==
=== Critical response ===
The episode as a whole received generally positive reviews, while Del Toro's opening sequence was critically acclaimed. David Hinckley of the New York Daily News gave "Treehouse of Horror XXIV" three stars out of five, writing that "'Treehouse of Horrors' remains an honorable tradition, and if nothing else, it reminds fans that they don't have to wait for South Park to get some good old-fashioned animated mayhem." Dennis Perkins of The A.V. Club gave the episode a B, saying, "After the season-opening Homeland parody storyline in last week's episode and a "Treehouse of Horror" for its second, we have yet to see exactly what this season has going for it as The Simpsons soldiers on for its 25th season, as these premise-heavy episodes haven't left much room for character. Next week will be the real test, but for now, I'll take these first two installments as cause for hope." Tony Sokol of Den of Geek wrote that the episode was "nearly a classic". He felt the third segment was the best and wrote that "When The Simpsons commit to a joke, they commit." Teresa Lopez of TV Fanatic gave the episode three out of five stars, saying "It was an enjoyable episode, but still, the necessity of scheduling the Halloween special so early makes it hard to get into the spooky spirit of things."

=== Viewing figures ===
The episode received a 3.0 rating and was watched by a total of 6.42 million people, this made it the most watched show on Animation Domination that night beating American Dad!, Bob's Burgers, and Family Guy.

=== Awards and nominations ===
Color design director Dmitry Malanitchev and background designer Charles Ragins won the Primetime Emmy Award for Outstanding Individual Achievement in Animation at the 66th Primetime Creative Arts Emmy Awards for their work in this episode.

Animators Lynna Blankenship, Dima Malanitchev, Debbie Peterson, Charles Ragins, and Jefferson R. Weekley were nominated for the Annie Award for Outstanding Achievement for Production Design in an Animated Television/Broadcast Production at the 41st Annie Awards. Director Guillermo del Toro, designer Guy Davis, and animator Ralph Sosa were nominated for the Annie Award for Outstanding Achievement for Storyboarding in an Animated Television/Broadcast Production at the same awards ceremony.
