= Pay Pal (The Simpsons) =

- The Simpsons episode
- Episode no.: Season 25; Episode 21
- Directed by: Mike Frank Polcino
- Written by: David H. Steinberg
- Production code: SABF15
- Original air date: May 11, 2014

Guest appearances
- Carl Kasell as himself; John Oliver as Booth Wilkes-John; Peter Sagal as himself

Episode features
- Couch gag: The Simpsons are pawns in The Game of Life, which ends when a Grim Reaper pawn shows up next to the couch.

Episode chronology
| ← Previous "Brick Like Me" | Next → "The Yellow Badge of Cowardge" |
- The Simpsons season 25

"Pay Pal" is the twenty-first episode of the twenty-fifth season of the American animated television series The Simpsons and the 551st episode of the series. It first aired on the Fox network in the United States on May 11, 2014. It was written by David H. Steinberg and directed by Mike Frank Polcino.

In the episode, Marge worries that she is setting a bad example for her daughter when Lisa declares that she does not need friends. John Oliver guest starred as Booth Wilkes-John. The episode received mixed reviews.

== Plot ==
Marge makes a cake for a block party, but when the cake batter splatters everywhere in the kitchen, she is forced to get a store bought cake. At the block party, Marge places her store bought cake on the table at the same time a new neighbor places his store bought cake. Despite her initial anxiety, Marge feels at ease meeting Booth Wilkes John, a British man, who invites Marge over to adult game night with his wife. Marge wants to go, but fears that Homer will ruin another adult game night for her. She talks to Homer in bed about not having any friends, yet Lisa chimes in with being okay with not having friends herself, which makes Marge extremely uncomfortable. At the new neighbor's home, Marge and Homer mingle with the guests. The game begins with role play based on Clue, and Homer unknowingly reveals the murderer in the story, prompting the host to kick the Simpsons out.

Depressed over not having friends, Marge decides to have a party for Lisa and invite everyone who knows her in order to make friends. Only one boy shows up, so Marge and Homer throw a quick party for the kid and send him off with party favors just in time as Lisa arrives home. At Springfield Elementary, Marge tries to figure out why Lisa does not have any friends. Miss Hoover tells Marge that no one in the class likes her for being too overbearing around everyone or trying to force her ideas on others.

When the class has to practice square dancing, Lisa is left without a partner until Tumi, an outside student, steps in to save the day. Tumi has the same interests as Lisa, but Bart is clearly suspicious and concerned for Lisa being duped. When Bart follows Tumi to the Krusty Burger play area, he learns the truth when he witnesses Marge handing over some cash to her. Feeling betrayed and sickened by her actions, he immediately delivers the photographic evidence to Lisa, who angrily confronts Marge for her actions. Lisa tells her mother that she would have found a friend in a decade, if she waited. When Marge tries to apologize, Lisa refuses to forgive her and retreats in her room.

While Marge mopes around, Grampa reveals that he paid Lenny and Carl to befriend Homer in the sandbox and to this day they are still friends. When Lisa intends to tell every psychiatrist about her ordeal, her mother is in tears, which makes Lisa secretly happy that she has found a new tactic to get what she wants from Marge. However, seeing Marge sobbing makes Lisa apologize and wish her a Happy Mother's Day. Homer and Bart flee, clearly aghast that they have forgotten Mother's Day.

The next day, Tumi apologizes to Lisa for her behavior and explains that she used the money to pay for a new belt. She also admits she does like being friends with Lisa. Lisa forgives her, but asks for her to be more honest with her from now on. However, Lisa leaves her when Tumi admits to not being a vegetarian and eating horsemeat.

== Production ==
In October 2013, TVLine reported that John Oliver would guest star as a previously unseen neighbor of the Simpsons named Wilkes John Booth.

== Reception ==
=== Viewing figures ===
The episode received a 1.6 rating and was watched by a total of 3.66 million people, making it the second most watched show on Animation Domination.

=== Critical response ===
Dennis Perkins of The A.V. Club gave the episode a B, saying "With some tinkering, 'Pay Pal,' the penultimate episode of this season, could have been something special. The central story, about Marge desperately trying to ensure that Lisa doesn’t grow up without friends, is the sort of family-centered plot that often produces the best Simpsons episodes. There are some good gags and a few affecting moments, and the Marge/Lisa relationship remains a fruitful one. It’s just that, like so many episodes this season, 'Pay Pal' frontloads too much establishing plot, forcing the emotional core of the story into a mad rush before the final credits."

Tony Sokol of Den of Geek gave the episode 4 out of 5 stars. He called the episode subversive with a sweet core.

=== Awards and nominations ===
David Steinberg was nominated for a Writers Guild of America Award for Outstanding Writing in Animation at the 67th Writers Guild of America Awards for his script to this episode.
