= Married to the Blob =

- The Simpsons episode
- Episode no.: Season 25; Episode 10
- Directed by: Chris Clements
- Written by: Tim Long
- Production code: SABF03
- Original air date: January 12, 2014

Guest appearances
- Harlan Ellison as himself; Maurice LaMarche as Milo; Stan Lee as himself

Episode features
- Chalkboard gag: "Judas Priest is not 'Death Metal'" (original airing) "If you haven't broken your Christmas presents yet, you're not trying" (reruns)
- Couch gag: As the family sits on the couch, Maggie changes their surroundings every time she uses the TV remote, cycling through several backgrounds with increasing speed. Once they are back in the living room, she throws the remote at the TV to turn it on. Animated by Bill Plympton.

Episode chronology
← Previous "Steal This Episode"	Next → "Specs and the City"
- The Simpsons season 25

"Married to the Blob" is the tenth episode of the twenty-fifth season of the American animated television series The Simpsons and the 540th episode of the series. It premiered on the Fox network in the United States on January 12, 2014. The episode was written by Tim Long and directed by Chris Clements.

In this episode, Comic Book Guy begins a relationship with Japanese artist Kumiko, but her father objects to it after hearing Homer's opinion of Comic Book Guy. Author Harlan Ellison and comic book writer Stan Lee guest starred as themselves. The episode received positive reviews from critics and was watched by 4.83 million viewers and an 18-49 rating of 2.2.

Coincidentally, the title for this episode has been previously used in a segment for "Treehouse of Horror XVII".

== Plot ==
Bart, Milhouse and Homer line up at Comic Book Guy's store to purchase the first issue of a Radioactive Man reboot comic. Comic Book Guy finds out that his competitor Milo (the owner of Coolsville) is now married to his girlfriend, Strawberry. Comic Book Guy cries and sings a song about him being lonely his entire life. Suddenly, an imaginary Stan Lee appears to Comic Book Guy and tells him that he has another chance in love. A Japanese girl named Kumiko Nakamura enters the store, and Stan Lee advises Comic Book Guy not to waste the opportunity. Kumiko is in the US to do research about the country's saddest cities for her autobiographical manga. Comic Book Guy asks her out for a date, and then asks Homer for dating advice, since Homer is the only fat man in real life who is married to an attractive woman. During the date, Marge advises Comic Book Guy to not be himself, but Kumiko actually likes Comic Book Guy's real personality.

Comic Book Guy continues to date Kumiko, and they both decide to move in together. While dropping off a gift for Kumiko and Comic Book Guy, Homer meets Kumiko's father in front of the store. Homer tells him about Comic Book Guy being an obese nerd, which prompts Mr. Nakamura to object to their relationship and take Kumiko away. Marge tells Homer to fix things up, so Homer takes Mr. Nakamura to a Japanese bar. They both drink Habushu (Snake Rice Wine), an incredibly strong form of rice wine (and Homer drinks what he thinks was fish wine when actually it was the restaurant aquarium) and stumble home intoxicated, where the city turns into a wonderland based on Studio Ghibli's films (specifically Spirited Away, My Neighbor Totoro, Ponyo, Princess Mononoke, Howl's Moving Castle, Kiki's Delivery Service, and Porco Rosso). Mr. Nakamura learns that by forbidding the relationship, he is taking away Kumiko's life.

Comic Book Guy tries to impress Mr. Nakamura by getting a real job using his hitherto unmentioned chemical engineering degree. Mr. Nakamura tells him that he does not have to get a real job since he already likes Comic Book Guy the way he is. The episode ends with Comic Book Guy and Kumiko getting married by Stan Lee in the Android's Dungeon.

== Production ==
Animator Bill Plympton created his third couch gag for this episode. The producers included a scene as a tribute to animator Hayao Miyazaki, who announced his retirement a few months earlier at the 70th Venice International Film Festival, with references to several of his films.

Author Harlan Ellison and comic book writer Stan Lee guest star as themselves. This is the second appearance of Stan Lee on the show after first guest starring in "I Am Furious (Yellow)."

== Reception ==
=== Viewing figures ===
The episode received a 2.2 rating and was watched by a total of 4.83 million people, making it the second most watched show on Animation Domination.

=== Critical response ===
The episode received generally positive reviews from critics.

Dennis Perkins of The A.V. Club gave the episode a B−, saying "I don’t want to be too hard on this episode. It’s always promising when the show tries something new, even if the results ultimately prove that not all experiments work out. And while I can’t say I’m clamoring for Comic Book Guy to enter The Simpsons’ regular rotation, the ending was a touching example of catchphrase re-purposing."

Tony Sokol of Den of Geek gave the episode a 3.5 out of 5, signaling moderate reviews, saying "if you want to know if this is a good episode, I’d answer with an emphatic: kinda. A lot of Simpsons episodes that focus on secondary characters aren’t as crisp as the one focusing on the family, but ‘Married to the Blob’ only suffers because it is in the middle of a particularly good season."

Teresa Lopez of TV Fanatic gave the episode a 3 out of 5, saying "Best episode ever? Not really, but I quite enjoyed all the comic, sci-fi, and various pop culture references." She then commented positively on the guests on the episode, saying "with appearances from Stan Lee and Harlan Ellison and a romance blossoming across the pages of Kumiko's Manga comic, the story was sweetly and entertainingly told. Kumiko's admiration of Comic Book Guy's snark perfectly reflects the reason why most Simpsons fans love Comic Book Guy. Plus, the hallucinatory sequence was a beautifully animated tribute to Anime director Hayao Miyazaki."

Christian Allaire of the National Post also noted the hallucination scene, calling it "a charming tribute to animator Hayao Miyazaki."

=== Awards and nominations ===
Re-Recording Mixers Mark Linden and Tara A. Paul were nominated for a Primetime Emmy Award for Outstanding Sound Mixing for a Comedy or Drama Series (Half-Hour) and Animation at the 66th Primetime Creative Arts Emmy Awards.

Writer Tim Long was nominated for the Annie Award for Outstanding Achievement for Writing in an Animated Television/Broadcast Production at the 42nd Annie Awards for this episode.
