= What to Expect When Bart's Expecting =

- The Simpsons episode
- Episode no.: Season 25; Episode 19
- Directed by: Matthew Nastuk
- Written by: John Frink
- Production code: SABF14
- Original air date: April 27, 2014

Guest appearances
- Tavi Gevinson as Jenny; Joe Mantegna as Fat Tony

Episode features
- Chalkboard gag: "April showers do not bring Matt Lauers" (on all broadcasting stations only) "You can't play April Fools jokes on April 27th" (on Hulu and Disney+ only)
- Couch gag: In a Michał Socha-directed opening, the Simpson family takes a nightmarish trip through Homer's body, eventually settling on a couch formed from his brain.

Episode chronology
← Previous "Days of Future Future"	Next → "Brick Like Me"
- The Simpsons season 25

"What to Expect When Bart's Expecting" is the nineteenth episode of the twenty-fifth season of the American animated television series The Simpsons and the 549th episode of the series. It originally aired on the Fox network in the United States on April 27, 2014. It was written by John Frink and directed by Matthew Nastuk.

In the episode, Bart makes a voodoo doll of his hippie art teacher when he gets sick of art class and cast a spell to make her sick, but when he inadvertently gets her pregnant, he becomes a savior to Springfield couples trying to conceive—and is subsequently kidnapped to help conceive a thoroughbred race horse. Tavi Gevinson guest starred as Jenny. The episode received mixed reviews.

== Plot ==
As Barney Gumble walks into Moe's, he notices that it is closed for a meeting. Moe is holding a meeting with the other bars in Springfield to discuss how their customer turnout has been low. When Moe holds a superhero themed bar crawl, Homer and his buddies join in the festivities, leaving Homer passed out in front of his home in the morning before Bart and Lisa leave on the school bus. Meanwhile, Bart feels smothered by his art teacher, who encourages nothing but the best from her students, and wants to get rid of her. When Bart visits a voodoo specialist, he receives some materials to cast a spell on his art teacher, yet his teacher still shows up to class the next day surprising Bart. Even though the spell was meant for a stomachache, Bart receives some startling news that his teacher is pregnant.

Ralph and Milhouse announce that Bart got the art teacher pregnant, leaving the entire school in disbelief. When a couple approaches Bart about his baby-making skills, Bart utilizes his voodoo spell etiquette to give a couple a baby. The spell works, and the couple returns to ask Bart if he could cast the same spell for their couple friends in the same position. Before long, Bart has opened a fertility voodoo clinic. Homer takes Bart to Moe's to discuss Bart's problems before Fat Tony's cronies come into the bar to kidnap them.

Upon meeting Fat Tony, he orders Bart to work his baby magic on his horses to create a champion racehorse. Bart immediately blames Homer for this situation due to his mediocre fathering techniques and blames them for leading Bart down the path he is on now. Homer sees this as an opportunity to show Bart how babies are made and make up for his awful parenting. However the stallion communicates that he is gay by playing "It's Raining Men". Homer then finds former Duff Beer advertising horse Sudsley Brew-Right, and tries to convince the mare to mate with him in a musical number. They are successful and a pregnancy test comes back positive. The Simpsons are then seen giving advice to the equine couple, after which the gay stallion nuzzles up to Sudsley. Lisa remarks "Now, that's a modern family", which is followed by a parody of the opening sequence of Modern Family.

The episode ends with a mock advertisement for Duff Beer seven-packs, featuring Sudsley.

== Production ==
The couch gag was directed by Polish animator Michał Socha and produced at ACME Filmworks. The animation style is similar to his 2008 short film, Chick. It was also inspired by the film Fantastic Voyage and the animated series Once Upon a Time... Life. The original idea was to have the family on the couch before they are eaten by Homer. It was then expanded to include what happens after they are eaten. The animation was a mix of 3D and 2D to keep to the style of The Simpsons while using Socha's experience in 3D animation. To better achieve the 2D look, the animated frames were manually repainted and secondary animation was added.

== Reception ==
=== Critical response ===
Dennis Perkins of The A.V. Club gave the episode a B−, saying "A serviceably funny episode with some good lines and an appearance from a reliable guest star, ’What To Expect When Bart’s Expecting’ nonetheless reiterates that current Simpsons episodes have a ceiling for what they can accomplish—and that it's lower than it used to be."

Teresa Lopez of TV Fanatic gave the episode two and a half stars out of four, saying "Once the central conflict is exposed, the writers seek to include some point to all this madness. Bart blames Homer for his bad behavior because he isn't a good role model, referencing his most recent exploits at the Superhero pub crawl (one of the few moments of true hilarity in this episode). Bart has a point, but it's one that has been made many times (and in better ways) in the past. Here, it just seemed useless."

=== Viewing figures ===
The episode received a 1.6 rating and was watched by a total of 3.45 million people, making it the second most watched show on Animation Domination that night.

=== Awards and nominations ===
The couch gag by Michał Socha was nominated for the Annie Award for Best Animated Short Subject at the 42nd Annie Awards.
