= Brian Kelley (writer) =

American television writer

Brian Kelley is an American television writer. He has written for SNL, Newsradio, Clerks, Futurama, Joey and The Simpsons.

== Biography ==
Kelley graduated with honors from Connecticut's Darien High School, and in 1990 he entered Harvard University as a physics major. He became a television writer four years later.

== Writing credits ==
=== The Simpsons episodes ===
- "Treehouse of Horror XIII" ("The Fright to Creep and Scare Harms") (Date November 3, 2002)
- "A Star Is Born Again" (Date March 2, 2003)
- "Margical History Tour" (Date February 8, 2004)
- "Lisa the Drama Queen" (Date January 25, 2009)
- "Postcards from the Wedge" (Date March 14, 2010)
- "Moms I'd Like to Forget" (Date January 9, 2011)
- "Treehouse of Horror XXIII" (With David Mandel) (Date October 7, 2012)
- "Homer Goes to Prep School" (Date January 6, 2013)
- "Specs and the City" (Date January 26, 2014)
- "Brick Like Me" (Date May 4, 2014)
- "The Princess Guide" (Date March 1, 2015)
- "The Marge-ian Chronicles" (Date March 13, 2016)
- "The Serfsons" (Date October 1, 2017)
- "Lisa Gets the Blues" (With David Silverman) (Date April 22, 2018)
- "101 Mitigations" (With Dan Vebber) (Date March 3, 2019)
- "Woo-Hoo Dunnit?" (Date May 5, 2019)
- "Livin' la Pura Vida" (Date November 17, 2019)
- "Wad Goals" (Date February 21, 2021)
- "The Longest Marge" (Date January 2, 2022)
- "The Very Hungry Caterpillars" (Date April 30, 2023)
- "Clan of the Cave Mom" (Date March 24, 2024)
- "Bart 'N' Frink" (Date November 9, 2025)
- "The Kosmic Kruiser" (Date November 8, 2026)

=== Futurama episodes ===
- "Love's Labours Lost in Space"

== Awards and nominations ==
Year	Nominated work	Episode	Award	Result	Ref.
2012	The Simpsons	"Treehouse of Horror XXIII" (Note: This episode was co-written by David Mandel, thus Kelley and Mandel shared the nomination.)	Writers Guild of America Award for Outstanding Writing in Animation	Nominated	
2014	The Simpsons	"Brick Like Me"	Writers Guild of America Award for Outstanding Writing in Animation	Won	
2017	The Simpsons	"The Serfsons"	Writers Guild of America Award for Outstanding Writing in Animation	Nominated	
2019	The Simpsons	"Livin La Pura Vida"	Writers Guild of America Award for Outstanding Writing in Animation	Nominated	
