= The Simpsons opening sequence =

Original version of The Simpsons title card with a three-eyed crow as of February 15, 2009

The Simpsons opening sequence is the title sequence of the American animated television series The Simpsons. It is accompanied by "The Simpsons Theme". The first episode to use this introduction was the series' second episode "Bart the Genius", released on January 14, 1990.

Each episode has the same basic sequence of events: the camera zooms through cumulus clouds, through the show's title towards the town of Springfield. The camera then follows the members of the Simpson family on their way home. Upon entering their house, the Simpsons settle down on their couch to watch television. One of the most distinctive aspects of the opening is that three of its elements change from episode to episode: Bart writes different phrases on the school chalkboard, Lisa plays different solos on her saxophone (or occasionally a different instrument), and different visual gags accompany the family as they enter their living room to sit on the couch.

The standard opening has had two major revisions. The first was at the start of the second season when the entire sequence was reanimated to improve the quality and certain shots were changed generally to add characters who had been established in the first season. The second was a brand-new opening sequence produced in high-definition for the show's transition to that format beginning with "Take My Life, Please" in season 20. The new opening generally followed the sequence of the original opening with improved graphics, even more characters, and new jokes.

== Sequence ==
=== Season 1 ===
This sequence opens with the show's title in yellow approaching the camera through misty cumulus clouds in a dark blue sky. The shot cuts through the counter in the letter "P" to an establishing shot of the town of Springfield.

The camera zooms in through the town, toward a lavender Springfield Elementary and then through a window to a lavender classroom, where Bart is writing lines on the chalkboard as a punishment, and three drawings are seen on the wall. When the school bell rings, Bart leaves in a hurry and skateboards out of the school doors.

The shot cuts to Homer working at the Springfield Nuclear Power Plant wearing a safety mask while handling a glowing green rod of uranium with a silver pair of tongs. An unknown co-worker in the background eats a sandwich with another pair of tongs. The end-of-shift whistle blows, and Homer immediately takes off his mask and drops his tongs to leave work. As he does so, the uranium rod bounces into the air and falls down the back of his radiation suit.

The next shot shows Marge and Maggie checking out at a supermarket. Maggie, who is sitting on the conveyor belt, is inadvertently scanned along with the groceries as Marge reads a magazine. Maggie is rung up at a price of US$847.63 (representing the monthly cost of raising a child at the time) and bagged. Marge frantically looks around for Maggie as the bag is dropped into her shopping cart which startles her and makes her turn around, then breathes a sigh of relief when Maggie pops up from the bag.

Lisa is shown next at band practice. The opening theme coordinates with this shot, and is orchestrated as if it were played by the school band. Mr. Largo stops the rest of the band to order Lisa out of the rehearsal for her unorthodox playing of her saxophone, which is light blue in this sequence, but gold in the episode. She continues to improvise on her way out of the room.

Shots of the family on their way home to 742 Evergreen Terrace are then shown. As Homer drives through Springfield, he fumbles behind his neck, pulls the uranium rod out of his shirt collar, and throws it out the car window. As it bounces off the curb near Moe's Tavern, Bart skateboards past, noticing a bank of televisions in a store window he passes showing Krusty the Clown; he then passes a bus stop and unwittingly steals its sign. The five unknown characters waiting at the stop then chase after a bus that fails to stop for them.

As soon as Bart crosses the road, a car drives past and Maggie is seen inside at the steering wheel. The camera alternates between close-ups of her jerking the wheel back and forth and the car veering wildly, it then zooms out to reveal that her wheel is only a toy. Marge is actually driving the car, and Maggie imitates her horn-honking. Lisa then rides her bicycle down the street, her books and saxophone case strapped into the front basket and the back of her seat, respectively; when she hits a bump, the books are briefly jolted upward but held down by the straps.

Lisa is the first to arrive at home as the garage door opens, jumping off her bike with her things (letting it roll into the garage) and running for the front door. Homer pulls into the driveway and parks, after which Bart bounces his skateboard off the car roof and follows Lisa toward the door. When Homer steps out of the car, he screams at the sight of Marge's car approaching and runs into the garage; the shot switches briefly to Marge's perspective as he escapes through a door into the house and she stops just short of crashing into the wall. The family members then enter the living room from different directions, creating a segue into the couch gag and finally the creator and developers' credits, shown on the television screen.

Notably in "Bart the Genius", the famous high-pitched scream of Homer's when he runs from Marge's car into the house is cut. The scream is added in the third episode, "Homer's Odyssey".

=== Seasons 2–20 ===
For the second season, the original opening was reanimated. Most shots were very closely copied, with some shots (such as Homer's first shot) appearing to be traced. The coloring was changed on most shots, and the characters and animation were cleaned up.

Some scenes were replaced or modified: in Bart's chalkboard gag, the school is now orange with purple accents instead of lavender, the classroom is now olive green instead of lavender, there are desks, a red wastebasket and a bookshelf in the background, and a photo of Homer as George Washington and a clock are seen on walls. In Homer's first shot at the power plant, Homer's tongs are now orange instead of silver, and Mr. Burns and Smithers study certain plans in the background, replacing the generic co-worker. When the end-of-shift whistle blows, Mr. Burns checks his wristwatch to see if it is working and then shakes it, suggesting that it has stopped.

When Bart skateboards down the sidewalk, the scenery is different, the bank of televisions is changed and shorter, and Bart no longer notices them. In addition, the bus stop and the unknown characters are replaced by multiple known secondary characters who crowd the sidewalk, with Moe's Tavern and other background scenery also added, earning the ire of Chief Wiggum. This is notably shorter and uses a different arrangement for the opening theme.

The close up of Lisa on her bike and her entering the house is cut, instead, upon Marge and Maggie honking their horns, there is a "whip-pan" across the town, featuring a significant number of secondary characters, towards the Simpsons' house. Homer reaches the house first instead of Lisa, and Bart bounces his skateboard off the car and rolls toward the front door. Homer leaves his car and dodges Lisa as she pedals up the driveway, following Bart without dismounting from her bike. The difference in the driveway scene is that Lisa's saxophone is no longer inside the saxophone case. Finally, the family television has been redesigned to give it less of a resemblance to the Tracy Ullman Shorts than in season 1. Since this season, there have been some episodes that had the opening sequence start from the chalkboard scene or the driveway scene.

Beginning with the second half of season 2, Homer yells "D'oh" as he dodges Lisa on her bike, this was previously silent.

Starting with season 3, a new, permanent arrangement of the opening theme is introduced, and Homer's time standing on the driveway is shorter, while the chalkboard is now in a consistent shade of black.

In season 8, parts of the opening theme are modified, such as on the on-screen logo.

=== Season 20–present ===
A digital collage comparing the original and high-definition versions of the opening sequence

A new, permanent opening sequence was animated for the show's transition to the high-definition format, premiering with the season 20 episode "Take My Life, Please". This sequence is similar to the previous one, but features many visual changes that take advantage of the wider format.

The sequence starts as usual with movement through cumulus clouds, while something random flies by. In some high-definition episodes such as "The Saga of Carl", the opening just shows the title and cuts through the counter in the "P" (similar to the past sequences). A few episodes also had additional text below the logo. Some episodes replace the show's title at the start with a different name. The camera then zooms past the nuclear power plant and into the town square where Jimbo and Kearney saw off the head of the statue of Jebediah Springfield (a callback to "The Telltale Head") which falls onto the head of Ralph, who is holding an ice cream cone. As it falls on him, he inadvertently tosses the cone into the statue's eye. Then, in selected episodes from "How the Test Was Won" to "Moe Letter Blues", he says a few words after the head falls on him. The camera then weaves through several buildings and structures, featuring a "billboard gag" towards Springfield Elementary and zooms through the familiar window where Bart writes lines as punishment on the chalkboard. In the background, the wastebasket is now dark green instead of red. Also, the picture on the wall is Homer as an astronaut instead of George Washington. When the bell rings and Bart skateboards out of the school doors, he plows through a pile of leaves raked up by Groundskeeper Willie; the impact exposes Barney Gumble lying under the leaves and causes him to belch or, in some episodes, say a greeting word to Bart.

Homer is shown at the power plant, and in the background, Lenny Leonard is standing on a ladder changing the number of "days without an accident" on the sign from 2 to 3. When the end-of-shift whistle blows, Lenny falls off the ladder onto Carl Carlson who is securing the bottom of the ladder. As in the first two opening sequences, the green uranium rod falls into Homer's clothing as he leaves. The scene cuts to Marge at the supermarket checkout with her older twin sisters, Patty and Selma. Among the products Marge is buying is Tomacco juice, Mr. Sparkle detergent and Krusty-O's cereal. Maggie is scanned, and the price doubles from US$243.26 to US$486.52, before she is put in the shopping cart. When Maggie pops her head out of the paper bag, Marge looks relatively calm and does not panic, unlike in the previous opening sequences. Maggie shakes her fist at Baby Gerald, who is beside her in another shopping cart, and Baby Gerald shakes his fist too. At band practice, Mr. Largo dismisses Lisa, who plays a solo as she leaves and then pokes her head back in the door to finish it. One notable difference from the previous opening sequences is Sherri and Terri, who are texting messages instead of playing their flutes. Another one is that Bart's classmates Martin and Wendell appear in the background. Also, Lisa's saxophone is now gold like in the actual show instead of light blue, and she is occasionally depicted playing a different instrument (trumpet, harp, etc.).

Homer is then shown driving home and discards the stuck uranium rod out the window; it lands in Otto's lap and he eats it. Bart skateboards past Otto before weaving through several townspeople: a machete-swinging Sideshow Bob, Helen Lovejoy, Apu and his octuplets, Moe, Comic Book Guy, Disco Stu, the Crazy Cat Lady, the Rich Texan and Chief Wiggum, who shakes his baton at Bart as Bart crosses the road. Hans Moleman pokes his head out from a manhole, which slams down on him when Marge drives over it in her car. Marge is now driving an orange station wagon instead of a red sedan, reflecting the change in the show. Maggie is shown in a booster seat in the middle while Grampa sleeps next to her. When Marge and Maggie honk their respective horns, Grampa is startled awake and his dentures fall out.

The camera then pans across Springfield and then cuts to the driveway scene. Unlike the other two opening sequences, Marge's car now hits Homer due to Marge looking at her cellphone as she was pulling in and carries him on the hood until it stops short, flinging him ahead to smash a Homer-shaped hole through the door. The couch gag is shown before the credits are displayed on a new, wall-mounted widescreen plasma television, which sometimes falls off and breaks or (in some episodes) the credits are presented in another way.

In the 500th episode, the opening sequence was a montage of all previous couch gags, pulling back into a photomosaic of the number "500", ending with Homer strangling Bart, both wearing tuxedos, saying his famous quote "Why you little!".

Some episodes since season 22 do not feature an opening sequence at all, instead it cuts from the clouds to the start of the episode.

Season 30 was the first season to not include shots of the family on their way home. Season 32 was the first season to only include chalkboard gags, the driveway scene and couch gags, and season 33 was the first season to exclude the chalkboard gags at the beginning of each episode. The full-length opening sequence returned in the season 34 finale episode, "Homer's Adventures Through the Windshield Glass".

== Development and variations ==
Creator Matt Groening developed a lengthy opening sequence for the first season of The Simpsons in order to cut down on the animation necessary for each episode; however, as compensation for the repeated material each week, Groening devised two intro gags. In the first of the original gags, the camera zooms in on Springfield Elementary School, where Bart can be seen writing a message on the chalkboard. This message, which changes from episode to episode, has become known as the "chalkboard gag". The other gag is known as the "couch gag", in which a twist of events occur when the family meets to sit on their couch and watch television. Groening, who had not paid much attention to television during his own childhood, was unaware that title sequences of such length were uncommon by that time. The episode "Bart the Genius" was the first to feature the series' full title sequence. The theme, which plays over the sequence, was composed by Danny Elfman in 1989, after Groening approached him requesting a retro-style theme. The piece, which took two days to create, has been noted by Elfman as the most popular of his career.

The season two episode "Bart Gets an 'F'" featured a revised opening sequence and a rearranged version of the theme, which was shortened by 15 seconds from its original length of roughly 90 seconds. The opening sequence for the first season showed Bart stealing a "Bus Stop" sign; whilst the new sequence featured him skateboarding past several characters who had been introduced during the previous season. Starting with this season, there were three versions of the opening: a full roughly 1.25-minute-long version, a 45-second-long version and a 25-second-long version. This gave the show's editors more leeway. The current arrangement of the theme by Alf Clausen was introduced in season 3.

"Take My Life, Please" was the first episode of The Simpsons to air in 720p high-definition television, though not the first time The Simpsons appeared in high-definition, as The Simpsons Movie was rendered in HD. This episode was the first to feature the new opening sequence. It was the first major permanent change to the show's introduction since the opening added in season two; previous changes have included variations in the duration of the intro, and special one-shot introductions for the Treehouse of Horror Halloween episodes, as well as a handful of others. This new intro also includes some 3D animation when the camera pans over Springfield. The Simpsons creator Matt Groening told the New York Post: "The clouds at the very beginning of the main title were always unsatisfying to me. My original direction to the animators was to make the clouds as realistic as possible, and as we go through the clouds we enter this cartoon universe of The Simpsons. Finally, after a couple of decades, they've gotten closer to what I had in my mind. Not perfect, but better."

The two original variations were further expanded to these variations:

- Something different flies past the show's logo in the clouds at the start of the intro (since 2009).
- The billboard in front of the elementary school changes (since 2009).
- Bart writes something different on the chalkboard in every episode.
- Lisa may play a different solo on her saxophone (or on a different instrument entirely).
- Homer's scream changes as he dodges Marge (first two seasons only).
- The Simpsons attempt to sit on the couch as something goes awry in an often surreal manner.
- In the 2009 intro, Ralph says something different when the head of Jebediah Springfield falls on him (selected episodes in season 20 and season 21).
- At the end of the sequence, the TV set sometimes comes loose from its wall mount and smashes on the floor (since 2009).

=== Billboard gag ===
The billboard gag is a running visual joke added to the opening sequence with the updated 2009 high-definition opening. In the gag, a billboard is seen on the roof of the building across the street from the elementary school as the camera pans through the town. The billboard changes every episode. The first episode with a billboard gag was "Take My Life, Please" where the billboard says "Krusty: Now Doing Funerals".

=== Chalkboard gag ===
The chalkboard gag is a running visual joke that occurs during the opening credits of many episodes. In this gag, Bart Simpson is writing lines on the chalkboard as a punishment; when the school bell rings, he immediately stops writing and runs out of the classroom. The phrase he writes on the chalkboard changes from episode to episode. Chalkboard messages may involve political humor such as "The First Amendment does not cover burping", pop culture references such as "I can't see dead people" (The Sixth Sense) and "I was not the sixth Beatle", and meta-references such as "I am not a 32-year-old woman" (in reference to Bart's voice actress Nancy Cartwright) and "Nobody reads these anymore". When possible, Bart is shown deliberately disobeying the line that he is writing on the chalkboard (e.g. squeaking chalk when asked to write "I will not squeak chalk", putting in ditto marks for "I will not cut corners", showing dis-coordination with "coffee is not for kids", or putting "I will finish what I sta" for a single line). In The Simpsons Movie, the gag, "I will not illegally download this movie", is a reference to piracy. In "MyPods and Boomsticks", the couch gag was the family finding Bart writing "I will not bring the chalkboard home" on a chalkboard in front of the couch.

The animators are able to produce the chalkboard gags quickly and in some cases have changed them to fit current events. For example, the chalkboard gag for "Homer the Heretic" reads, "I will not defame New Orleans." The gag had been written as an apology to the city for a controversial song in the previous week's episode, which called the city a "home of pirates, drunks and whores". Another such chalkboard line gave the creators' stance on the threats made towards another popular animated sitcom, South Park, by the group Revolution Muslim, following the controversies with the episodes "200" and "201" and the depictions of Muslim prophet Muhammad ("South Park- We'd stand beside you if we weren't so scared"). Many episodes do not feature a chalkboard gag because they are cut to make more room for story, plot development and advertisements. In "Four Regrettings and a Funeral" (season 25, 2013), Bart writes "We'll really miss you Mrs. K" only once, in tribute to the recent death of Marcia Wallace, the voice of Edna Krabappel. In the first episode to air after Donald Trump won the United States presidential election in 2016, Bart writes "Being right sucks", a reference to the 2000 episode "Bart to the Future" where Lisa succeeds Trump as Commander-in-Chief. In "The Incredible Lightness of Being a Baby", "School Online" is shown on the chalkboard as the school itself was being temporarily closed due to the COVID-19 pandemic.

=== Lisa's solo ===
During the opening sequence, Lisa is seen being dismissed from band rehearsal due to her non-conformist saxophone playing. She exits the room playing a saxophone solo. Ever since the current arrangement was introduced starting in Season 3, the resulting solo is changed similarly to the couch gag. Some of the solos have similarities with pieces by Donovan, Frank Zappa, James Brown, and Charlie Parker. The Simpsons composer Alf Clausen said that the session musicians who perform her solos do not try to play at the second grade level and instead "think of Lisa as a really good player". Lisa plays the baritone saxophone, but according to Matt Groening, "she doesn't always play a baritone sax because the animators don't know what it looks like, so it changes shape and color from show to show."

After the switch to HD production, Lisa has also occasionally performed her solo on an instrument other than the saxophone. As of season 20, she has played a trumpet, a violin, a fiddle, a tuba, a baritone horn, a clarinet, a theremin, and a harp. In this last instance, she drags the instrument with her and continues playing once Mr. Largo orders her out of the room. Whenever she plays a different instrument, she takes it with her while riding home on her bike.

=== Couch gag ===
The couch gag featured in the episode, "One Fish, Two Fish, Blowfish, Blue Fish"

The "couch gag" is a running visual joke near the end of the opening credits. The gag generally changes from episode to episode, and usually features the Simpson family's living room couch. A typical gag features the Simpson family running into the living room, only to find some abnormality with the couch, be it a bizarre and unexpected occupant, the replacement of the couch with something else, an odd placement of the couch, such as on the ceiling, or any number of other situations.

In the syndicated version for the episodes from seasons 1 to 5, the couch gag for the episode is usually replaced with the one from season five's "Rosebud" where The Simpsons find an exact double of themselves on the couch (though the syndicated versions of the later episodes retain their original couch gags).

The couch gag is frequently used to make the show longer or shorter, depending on the length of the episode itself. For example, longer couch gags have been used to fill time in shorter episodes, such as in "Lisa's First Word", "I Love Lisa", "The Front", "Cape Feare", "Fear of Flying", "Monty Can't Buy Me Love", "Simpson Safari" and "The Bart Wants What It Wants", where the family dances in a kickline with women resembling the Rockettes; or in "Homerazzi", "The Homer of Seville", and "Mona Leaves-a", where Homer goes from prehistory to modern history as he starts out as a unicellular being and evolves into many creatures until he finally reaches the modern day and evolves into the present Homer. An extended couch gag was also seen in the first episode to use the new opening sequence, "Take My Life, Please", where the family chases their couch on a tour across the world. Another long couch gag was in the show's 500th episode "At Long Last Leave", showing a montage of previous couch gags.

== Other versions ==
Some episodes feature an opening sequence with a different theme.

=== Variations ===
==== Live action ====
In 2006, the British television channel Sky One began advertising The Simpsons using a live-action recreation of the series' opening sequence directed by Chris Palmer. With the exception of the very first shot in which the logo appears out of the clouds, every piece of the opening is present in this version, with even multiple chalkboard and couch gags filmed. Attached to the end of this sequence is the message "Come home to The Simpsons on Sky One." The recreation was used instead of the regular opening sequence in the season 17 episode "Homer Simpson, This Is Your Wife", first broadcast on the Fox network on March 26, 2006. The live-action opening had also become an Internet hit before it was aired in front of "Homer Simpson, This Is Your Wife", and it was Groening's decision to use it. Al Jean commented in a press statement that he was "just amazed there are people who want to be known for looking like the Simpsons."

==== The Simpsons Movie callback ====
"He Loves to Fly and He D'ohs" was the first new episode to air following the release of The Simpsons Movie, and the episode's opening sequence is a callback to the film. Bart writes "I will not wait 20 years to make another movie" on the chalkboard and skateboards through Springfield, which is still recovering from the dome incident. Several movie characters reappear, including President Schwarzenegger, the Multi-Eyed Squirrel, Colin, Russ Cargill, and the Medicine Woman. Also seen is that the Simpsons' house is still under construction and the silo is strapped to Homer's car. Plopper the pig is also featured for the first time in the series, during the couch gag and Homer refers to him as "my summer love".

==== "Tik Tok" ====
A special opening sequence, featuring the cast lip dubbing to Kesha's single "Tik Tok", was animated for the season 21 episode "To Surveil with Love", which aired on May 2, 2010 to promote "Fox Rocks" week. This is the first canonical episode in the show's history that does not feature "The Simpsons Theme" in any capacity, apart from "Simpsons Roasting on an Open Fire". The sequence starts with Lisa waking up and then grabbing Milhouse's glasses. It then shows Groundskeeper Willie brushing his teeth with whiskey. He then gives it to Mrs. Krabappel who drinks some while they walk into school before Mrs. Krabappel grabs Willie and drags him into a classroom. In the hallway Sherri, Terri and Martin are having pedicures while Ralph is playing in the lost and found box. Principal Skinner and Superintendent Chalmers walk past. The three bullies stick their heads out a classroom and blow up a phone causing coins to explode out of it. Then it shows the music room, followed by the bus where Otto falls over. It then shows Nelson singing before showing inside Moe's bar where a group of people are fighting. Marge comes and drags Homer out of the bar and into her car where they drive home. It then pans over a few characters. Marge and Homer then come in where Lisa, Bart (dressed like a rapper) and Maggie are waiting. They all run into the living room and sit on the couch before a number of characters lift them up. The family then falls asleep.

==== Underwater ====
The season 29 episode "Singin' in the Lane", which aired on November 19, 2017, features underwater themed opening sequence, with all of the characters including the Simpson family depicted as sea animals.

This sequence begins with the title "The Shrimpsons" zooming through the bubbles while Blinky the three-eyed fish swims by. The scene zooms toward a hole in the sunken ship to an underwater classroom where a fish Bart is writing lines ("We do not live in our own pee") on the chalkboard as punishment. The bell rings, and Bart rides a sting ray out of another hole in the ship, scaring away the school of fish covering Barney's skeleton. Homer is shown at an underwater lab in a deep sea diving suit handling a green glowing fish, while Lenny changes the number of "days until global warming" on the sign from 3 to 2. The end-of-shift whistle that blows scares him and Carl away, and prompts Homer to get out of the diving suit. The scene then cuts to an underwater store, where Maggie is bagged and put in a shopping cart. Marge gets shocked, and Maggie pops her head out of the bag, reliving Marge. Maggie then shakes her fin at Baby Gerald in another shopping cart, and Baby Gerald shakes his fin too. At band practice, Lisa is dismissed by Mr. Largo and plays a solo on her saxophone while leaving, then she pokes her head through the seaweed to finish it.

An anglerfish Otto is seen chewing on his own light and Bart rides past him before weaving through other characters. Hans Moleman is seen under a seashell which is then closed under him when a sea turtle goes over it. Marge and Maggie steer with sea stars to make the turtle go different directions. The camera then quickly pans to Homer arriving at the coral reef, Bart jumps off him, and Homer dodges Lisa while she carries her saxophone, then the sea turtle carries Homer on its head and crashes him into the reef. The family then swims into their underwater living room, which is decorated with coral, underwater plants, and other decorations that are from the reef, and sits on the couch. A fishing hook then grabs the couch with the family in tow, and is raised to the surface of the ocean, where a human Ned Flanders grabs the couch and says, "Okily dokily!" as he places them inside a lobster cage. Once in it, Homer says, "Aw, our own home." A few lobsters are later seen crawling towards the family. The sequence then ends as usual with the opening credits on the underwater television.

==== Flanders ====
The Flanders-focused episode titled "Todd, Todd, Why Hast Thou Forsaken Me?" from season 31, which aired on December 1, 2019, begins with the title "The Flanderseseseses" and cuts through the counter in the letter "R" to Todd Flanders doing a chalkboard gag. The scene then cuts to Ned at the supermarket checkout. Among the products he buys is Bland-O-Lake butter, White Bread for the Soul, a Devout People Magazine and Mild Rice. Ned then walks out of the supermarket with his products, and starts a "Food Kitchen for the Homeless". Then, Homer is seen on a tractor feeling sad, while Ned parks his car in his garage, before he walks in through a door in it. Ned, Rod and Todd run into their living room where their couch would be, but Ned says to Rod and Todd, "No couch boys, I gave it to the poor," and they cheer.

=== Christmas variations ===
==== Original variation ====
A Christmas-themed version of the opening sequence was animated for the season 18 episode "Kill Gil, Volumes I & II", which aired on December 17, 2006, and later re-aired with the season 20 episode "The Burns and the Bees", which aired on December 7, 2008. It begins with two lines of instrumental "Jingle Bells" ("Kill Gil, Volumes I & II") and "O Christmas Tree" ("The Burns and the Bees") and then the normal theme music begins. This version is similar to the normal version, except for several key differences:

1. Everything outside is covered with snow
2. Bart's skateboard has been replaced with a snowboard
3. Everyone is wearing winter attire
4. Mr. Burns and Smithers have been replaced by a Scrooge-esque Burns and Ghost of Marley-esque Smithers, and there are several Christmas banners in the plant
5. Lisa's saxophone solo is a jazz version of "Deck the Halls"
6. Bleeding Gums Murphy, who is now deceased, has been replaced with Jasper in a Santa costume. Maude Flanders and Marvin Monroe, however, remain in the pan across Springfield
7. Marge and Maggie's supermarket and car sequences have been cut

In the end, the couch gag is that the family sits on the couch and the camera then pulls out to reveal that the family was reflected in a Christmas ornament, which rests on a Christmas tree.

==== High-definition variations ====
A Christmas version of the sequence in High-definition appeared in the season 25 episode "White Christmas Blues", which aired on December 15, 2013. The entire sequence is similar to the 2009 opening, but is a retelling of The Night Before Christmas with a Christmas-arranged opening theme. Key differences include:

1. Jimbo and Kearney saw off the star of the Christmas tree instead of the head of Jebediah Springfield and the star falls on Ralph who is licking a frozen pole
2. When Bart snowboards out the school doors, he plows into a pile of snow shoveled by Groundskeeper Willie, exposing Grandpa underneath as he holds a sign that says "Still warmer than nursing home"
3. The plant has been replaced with Santa's workshop, Homer paints a cane and Lenny changes the number of "days till March 28, actual birth of Christ" on the sign from 94 to 93 before falling off the ladder
4. Marge's supermarket has been replaced with a gift shop, Maggie is gifted, she stamps Baby Gerald as "defective", and two men take him away
5. At band practice, Sherri and Terri play bells instead of flutes, and snow falls on Lisa after she finishes her solo
6. Homer's car has been replaced with a snowmobile and Otto smokes on the cane when it lands on his lap
7. Marge's car has been replaced with a dog sled, two more sleds come to her until Mr. Burns and Smithers' sled scares the other mean sled away, and Maggie imitates Marge's rope throwing
8. When Marge's dog sled hits Homer and carries him on the front edge, he says "Merry Christmas" after being crashed into the back door

The first, second and eighth scenes of this sequence re-aired with the season 32 episode "Sorry Not Sorry", which aired on December 6, 2020.

The second HD Christmas version appeared in the season 26 episode "I Won't Be Home for Christmas", which aired on December 7, 2014. Unlike the first HD Christmas version, Jimbo and Kearney's Christmas tree scene has been cut, the other key differences are as follows:

1. When Bart snowboards out the school doors, he plows into the pile of snow shoveled by Groundskeeper Willie, who is being played by two polar bears
2. At Santa's Workshop, Lenny changes the number of "days until Greek Orthodox Christmas" on the sign from 31 to 30 before falling off the ladder
3. At Marge's gift shop, Maggie gives Baby Gerald a present to make him feel better
4. At band practice, everyone plays "Jingle Bells", and Lisa gets completely covered in snow after she finishes her solo
5. In Marge's dog sled scene, an abominable snowman is seen in the background, and three more sleds come to her until Mr. Burns and Smithers' sled scares the other two mean sled away
6. When Bart bounces off his snowboard on Homer's head, he says "D'oh!"

The couch gag, in the end, features a message that reads: "Now for obligatory Frozen reference", before cutting to a snow couch, where Lisa, appearing as Elsa, is sitting. Bart as Kristoff hits her with a snowball and she immediately creates a giant ice palace, with Bart stuck at the top. Homer appears as Olaf, and bites his own nose, disappointed to discover it is simply a carrot.

The third HD Christmas version appeared in the season 29 episode "Gone Boy", which aired on December 10, 2017, and later re-aired with the season 30 episode "'Tis the 30th Season", which aired on December 9, 2018. This time, it is a Santa's workshop-themed version. The following key differences are:

1. When Bart snowboards out the school doors, he crashes into Frosty the Snowman, who was built by Groundskeeper Willie
2. At Santa's Workshop, Lenny changes the number of "Bricks and Mortar stores remaining" on the sign from 24 to 23 before falling off the ladder
3. At band practice, everyone plays "Deck the Halls" ("'Tis the 30th Season" only)
4. In Marge's dog sled scene, an elf is seen in the background, and four more sleds come to her until Mr. Burns and Smithers' sled scares the other three mean sleds away ("Gone Boy" only)
5. In "'Tis the 30th Season", the shots of the family on their way back to 742 Evergreen Terrace have been cut

Each episode has a different Christmas-themed couch gag at the end. In "Gone Boy", the family pops into popcorn sitting on a hot couch, and are threaded onto a garland that is hung around the Christmas tree. "'Tis the 30th Season"'s couch gag is a spoof to Star Wars, where Bart cuts off Wampa Homer's hand while they and the rest of the family say "Merry Christmas!".

=== The Simpsons Movie ===
A completely different sequence was created for The Simpsons Movie and features an orchestrated version of "The Simpsons Theme" as adapted by Hans Zimmer. The cumulus clouds are displayed in 16:9 television aspect ratio, with black matte bars at either end of the screen. As "The Simpsons" logo appears out of the clouds, Professor Frink flies past in one of his inventions carrying a banner marked "MOVIE" and proclaims "Moo-vie! On the big screen!" (On the movie's DVD menu he says, "On the small screen!" when the menu appears, but then "On the big screen" during the actual opening sequence.) Frink bumps one of the matte bars out of view, and the other one recedes as the camera cuts through the counter in the "O" and zooms in on the town, with several major landmarks popping up. The scene changes to Mr. Burns, who collapses under the extra weight of the toothpaste on his toothbrush, which is dispensed by Smithers. The camera then zooms past Moe's Tavern into the Kwik-E-Mart where Apu is secretly changing the expiration date on a carton of milk from 2006 to 2008. The camera cuts to Springfield Elementary where Jimbo, Dolph and Kearney are hoisting Martin Prince up a flagpole by his underwear and saluting it as if it were a flag. The camera then zooms through a window of the school where Bart is doing the chalkboard gag which is "I will not illegally download this movie", a reference to piracy before quick-fading to the popular 90s band Green Day who are hosting a concert at Lake Springfield, playing their rendition of "The Simpsons Theme".

=== Others ===
==== Breaking Bad parody ====
An homage to the AMC drama Breaking Bad is used as an opening sequence for the season 24 episode "What Animated Women Want", which aired on April 14, 2013 and is set to the tune of "Crystal Blue Persuasion" by Tommy James and the Shondells. The song is also used during a montage in the Breaking Bad episode "Gliding Over All", in reference to the blue-colored methamphetamine produced by the show's central character Walter White.

The sequence opens with a parody of the Breaking Bad title card, with The Simpsons displayed across the screen with the symbols for Thorium (Th) and Silicon (Si) appearing at the beginning of each word. Marge, aping the downtrodden demeanor of Walter's wife Skyler, sits on the couch drinking coffee. She goes into the kitchen to begin baking cupcakes, using food coloring to turn the batter blue and adding frosting and sprinkles in other shades of this color. She places one batch in a silver briefcase, which she gives to Bart before he leaves the house. Homer, dressed in the dark hat and sunglasses Walter dons for his "Heisenberg" persona, sneaks a taste of the batter while Marge is baking and is later woken from a nap by the smell. The scene cuts to a church bake sale, where Marge sells a cupcake to Milhouse as Homer watches from a distance. Back at the Simpson house, Marge runs her earnings through a currency-counting machine, bundles the money, and adds it to a large pile on the dining table. The camera zooms out to reveal a live-action scene (taken from the episode "Hazard Pay") of Walter White and his partner Jesse Pinkman sitting on a couch drinking beer and watching the sequence on a TV.

==== Futurama parody ====
The crossover episode "Simpsorama" from season 26, which aired on November 9, 2014, begins with a parody of the Futurama title sequence, which includes the Futurama theme music and the text reading "A show out of ideas teams up with a show out of episodes." It ends with a couch gag with the Simpsons sitting on the couch, only to find out the couch is actually Hedonismbot.

==== Adventure Time parody ====
The season 28 episode "Monty Burns' Fleeing Circus", which aired on September 25, 2016, features a couch gag that is a parody of the Adventure Time opening, called "Simpsons Time", recreated with characters from The Simpsons. The song for this opening is sung by Pendleton Ward, who sung the theme song for Adventure Time, and also created the show.

==== "Bart Gets the Remote" ====
Used as an opening sequence for the season 28 episode "Dad Behavior", which aired on November 20, 2016. The sequence opens as usual, until Bart skateboards out of the school and lands on the pile of leaves. He wakes up Barney in the process, who then grabs his skateboard and breaks it in half, forcing him to walk home.

At work, when Homer drops his tongs, the glowing rod bounces into his mouth, causing him to swallow it, before collapsing. At school, when Largo dismisses Lisa, she hits the door with her saxophone and collapses; the saxophone then falls on her. Next, when Maggie is seen at the steering wheel, when the camera zooms out, it reveals that she is actually driving the car while Marge is sleeping in the backseat. She then wakes up, just when the car drives off a cliff and through a barn. In the process, a hen gets in the car, and is sitting next to Maggie, clucking, before she sticks her pacifier into its mouth, before driving them all into the lake, where the car sinks. Marge and the hen then surface, but Maggie does not. Finally, the couch is shown, and Bart walks into the room, alone, carrying his broken skateboard. After calling around for his family, but getting no notice, he takes their pictures and puts them on the couch as he sits there, remarking that he gets the remote.

== Guest-made versions ==
Some episodes have an opening sequence that was made by a special guest.

=== Banksy ===
British graffiti artist and political activist Banksy is credited with creating the opening titles and couch gag for the season 22 episode "MoneyBart", in what amounted to the first time that an artist has been invited to storyboard the show. Jean first took note of Banksy after seeing his 2010 film Exit Through the Gift Shop. According to Jean, "The concept in my mind was, 'What if this graffiti artist came in and tagged our main titles?'" Simpsons casting director Bonnie Pietila was able to contact the artist through the film's producers, and asked if he would be interested in writing a main title for the show. Jean said Banksy "sent back boards for pretty much what you saw." Series creator Matt Groening gave the idea his blessing, and helped try to make the sequence as close to Banksy's original storyboards as possible.

Approximately the first half minute of the opening sequence remains the same, with a few oddities: the word "BANKSY" is sprayed onto a number of walls and other public spaces. The chalkboard gag ("I must not write all over the walls") is written all over the classroom walls, clock, door, and floor. After the Simpsons arrive at home, the camera cuts to a shot of them on the couch, then zooms out to show this as a picture hanging on the wall of a fictional overseas Asian animation and merchandise sweatshop. The animation color quickly becomes drab and gray, and the music turns dramatic à la Schindler's List. A large group of tired and sickly artists draw animation cels for The Simpsons among piles of human bones and toxic waste, and a female artist hands a barefoot child employee an animation cel, which he washes in a vat of biohazardous fluid. Small kittens are thrown into a woodchipper-type machine to provide the filling for Bart Simpson plush dolls. The toys are then placed into a cart pulled by a sad panda which is driven by a man with a whip. A man shipping boxes with The Simpsons logo on the side uses the tongue from a severed dolphin head to fasten shut the packages. Another employee uses the horn of a sickly unicorn to smash the holes in the center of The Simpsons DVDs. It is then revealed that the sweatshop is contained within a grim version of the 20th Century Fox logo, surrounded by barbed wire, searchlights, and a watchtower.

The Simpsons is storyboarded at Film Roman, a company based in California. The storyboards, voice tracks and coloring instructions are then sent to AKOM, a company in Seoul, South Korea. According to Nelson Shin, the founder of AKOM, they received the storyboard for the sequence in August 2010. Believing the sequence to be "excessive and offending" he pushed for some of the darker jokes to be removed. He was successful, though "not nearly as much as he had pushed for." For example, in the storyboards, the workers were wearing conical Asian hats, but these were removed. Fox's standards and practices department also demanded a handful of changes, but, according to Jean, "95 percent of it is just the way [Banksy] wanted." Banksy told The Guardian that his opening sequence was influenced by The Simpsons long-running use of animation studios in Seoul, South Korea. The newspaper also reported that the creation of the sequence "is said to have been one of the most closely guarded secrets in US television – comparable to the concealment of Banksy's own identity." Although conceding to the fact that The Simpsons is largely animated in South Korea, Jean went on to state that the scenes shown in titles are "very fanciful, far-fetched. None of the things he depicts are true. That statement should be self-evident, but I will emphatically state it."

=== John Kricfalusi ===
After the positive response to the opening sequence by Banksy, creator Matt Groening and Jean came to Canadian animator and creator of The Ren & Stimpy Show, John Kricfalusi and asked him if he could do something similar for the season 23 episode "Bart Stops to Smell the Roosevelts". Originally, they only wanted him to do the storyboards and then let their regular crew animate it, but Kricfalusi insisted on doing the animation himself, explaining that "If we had done it that way, no one would even have known that I had anything to do with it because it would have ended up on model and all pose to pose". On The Simpsons, the animators draws key poses and then let tweeners interpolate between those poses. The interpolation however, is a straight A-to-B animation. That way the animation ends up having the characters just going from pose to pose. Kricfalusi explains that "On the Simpsons I wanted to try moving the characters in crazy fun ways, not just looking funny each time they come to a stop", and further elaborated "that the way things happened was even more important than what was happening in my work. You can’t write visual performance. You have to actually draw it."

He showed Groening and showrunner Al Jean his Adult Swim shorts and Groening responded by giving him a free hand to do the 35-second-long segment. Groening told him to break all The Simpsons rules, but Kricfalusi explains that he "tried not to break any rules in the characters’ personalities, just in the execution of the visuals. I didn't follow any models – not even my own". The more rules he broke, the more pleased Groening and Jean were with the result. Contrary to Banksy, who lives a life in secrecy, Kricfalusi was involved in every detail and even oversaw the dubbing of the final soundtrack. While Kricfalusi animated the 2D parts, he had John Kedzie to help him with the computer graphics and Sarah Harkey and Tommy Tanner to do the assistant animation.

The couch gag for the episode, which had Homer demand a beer and Marge getting it for him, was critically acclaimed by television critics. Amid Amidi of Cartoon Brew calls the opening revolutionary and explains that "in 35 short and sweet seconds, he liberates the animation of The Simpsons from years of graphic banality." He continued: "The visual look of the show, which has been so carefully controlled by its producers, becomes a giddy and unrestrained playground for graphic play, and the balance of creative authority is shifted from the writers’ room to the animators in one fell swoop." When comparing the segment to Banksy's, Amidi concluded that it is "in fact, far more subversive because he focuses almost exclusively on making a pictorial statement, relegating the show's dominant literary elements to the back seat." Similarly, Television Blend's Katey Rich wrote that she appreciates "The Simpsons always being willing to push the envelope in different ways", but admitted that "it's gonna take [her] some time to get the gangly-legged Marge Simpson and the leering Homer Simpson out of [her] brain."

Kricfalusi later animated the opening sequence for the season 27 episode "Treehouse of Horror XXVI", his second and so far only other opening for the show, where the Simpson children are trick-or-treating before being set upon by soul-hungry spirits with a monstrous Frank Grimes among them that skins Bart for his soul before Maggie saves him and Lisa. The spirits chase after the Simpson children to their home, and the Frank Grimes monster takes Homer's soul.

=== Bill Plympton ===
Bill Plympton has written and animated eight couch gags, one for the season 23 episode "Beware My Cheating Bart" where Homer falls in love with the couch, one for the season 24 episode "Black Eyed, Please" where Homer, Marge, Bart, and Lisa are in a 1930s-style gangster story armed with several weapons which are revealed to be gifts once Maggie turns the light on, one for the season 25 episode "Married to the Blob" where Maggie changes the family's surroundings every time she uses the TV remote, cycling through several backgrounds with increasing speed, one for the season 27 episode "Lisa the Veterinarian" where the television and couch imagine themselves frolicking together, one for the season 28 episode "22 for 30" where the family is crudely drawn on the couch and each family member is subsequently drawn by the next oldest, ending with Homer holding a spare pencil and a donut in his non-drawing hand, one for the season 29 episode "3 Scenes Plus a Tag from a Marriage" which is a reference to his 1987 film Your Face with Homer's face as a replacement, one for the season 32 episode "Manger Things" which depicts Homer's head turning into the family and the living room, and one for the season 34 episode "One Angry Lisa" where the rug becomes a vortex and eats the Simpson family.

=== Robot Chicken ===
The couch gag for the season 24 episode "The Fabulous Faker Boy", which aired on May 12, 2013, was stop-motion animated by Seth Green's Stoopid Buddy Stoodios, which also works on the television series Robot Chicken.

=== Guillermo del Toro ===
Guillermo del Toro directed the 3-minute opening sequence for the season 25 episode "Treehouse of Horror XXIV", aired on October 6, 2013, which contained numerous references to horror and science fiction, including his own films.

=== Sylvain Chomet ===
The couch gag for the season 25 episode "Diggs", which aired on March 9, 2014, was directed by Sylvain Chomet. It depicts the family running to the couch until the lights go off. Marge leaves to fix the fuse, and when the lights go up, the characters are drawn Triplets of Belleville-style and everything has a French aesthetic to it. Bart plays with a do-it-yourself foie gras kit, Lisa plays an accordion, Marge cries out, "Maggie? Où est Maggie?" and Homer gets up and eats a snail off the TV, oblivious that Maggie is stuck between his butt cheeks.

=== Michał Socha ===
The couch gag for the season 25 episode "What to Expect When Bart's Expecting", which aired on April 27, 2014, was directed by Michał Socha. It depicts the family taking a nightmarish trip through Homer's body, eventually settling on a couch formed from his brain.

=== Don Hertzfeldt ===
The couch gag for the season 26 episode "Clown in the Dumps", which aired on September 28, 2014, was animated by the Academy Award-nominated surrealist animator Don Hertzfeldt, who was recommended to the show by Mike B. Anderson. It depicts Homer using a time-traveling remote control to regress to his original 1987 character model from "The Tracey Ullman Show" then accidentally going into a distant future incarnation of the show called The Sampsans where he and his family have evolved into grotesque, mindless, catchphrase-spouting mutants, which also say to 'buy their merchandise'. Homer (now named 'Homar') sees a window, triggering memories of when the show was more pure and genuine, and where in one of the three flashbacks, Marge says 'Still love you Homar'. Homer feels sad when he returns to the bastardized world he lives in. Al Jean deemed it "crazier than we thought" and "the most insane one we've ever done".

=== Pixel art ===
The opening sequence for the season 26 episode "My Fare Lady", which aired on February 15, 2015, was done in a pixel art style, created by Australian animators Paul Robertson and Ivan Dixon. Jeremy Dower, an Australian musician, created a chiptune version of the main theme song, which was used in this version. It was first posted on YouTube as "simpsons pixels".

=== Rick and Morty ===
The couch gag for the season 26 episode "Mathlete's Feat", which aired on May 17, 2015, features Rick Sanchez and Morty Smith from the Adult Swim series Rick and Morty. The couch gag was written by Dan Harmon and Justin Roiland. The episode with George Bush was mentioned by them.

=== Steve Cutts ===
The couch gag for the season 27 episode "Teenage Mutant Milk-Caused Hurdles", which aired on January 10, 2016, features guest animator Steve Cutts' "LA-Z Rider" with over 14 million views on YouTube. Fox had anticipated low viewing figures due to the NFL overrun pushing the start of primetime to 8:20 p.m. Despite this, the episode was the highest viewed of season 27 with 8.3 million views.

=== Eric Goldberg ===
The couch gag for the season 27 episode "Fland Canyon", which aired on April 24, 2016, was created by veteran Disney animator Eric Goldberg. It depicts the family as different Disney characters with Maggie as 1920s-era Minnie Mouse, Lisa as Cinderella, Marge as Snow White, Homer as Baloo, and Bart as Sorcerer's apprentice Mickey Mouse.

=== Yarn ===
Stoopid Buddy Stoodios created their second couch gag for the season 34 episode "The Many Saints of Springfield", which aired on February 19, 2023. It depicts Homer finding a piece of thread sticking out of the couch, and when he pulls on the thread, he ends up falling through the couch, where he becomes a yarn version of himself. Homer meets an old Mickey Mantle rookie card in the couch, which Homer calls the greatest treasure of his youth. Homer then notices a Rubik's Cube and rips the Mickey Mantle card so he can go to the Rubik's Cube instead. After turning it once to try and solve it, Homer becomes frustrated at the Rubik's Cube. Homer then hears a voice and recognizes it as ALF, who is on the cover of a TV Guide. Homer tells ALF that he was cancelled too soon, but ALF says that he was cancelled at the right time.

In the outside world, Marge is looking for Homer. Homer hears her calling for him and tells ALF that he should go. Everyone tells Homer that he can't go as he's part of the couch now, and a lot of lost snacks also try and stop Homer from leaving. Marge finds the thread that Homer found and starts to pull it out. Homer jumps on a spring and jumps up to grab the thread as Marge pulls it out all the way. When Homer comes back into the outside world, he's still made of thread. Snowball II then attacks him.

== Parodies within the show ==
The opening sequence has been parodied within seven episodes of The Simpsons:

- A short parody as The Thompsons in the episode "Cape Feare", when the Simpsons go into a witness protection program to evade Sideshow Bob, changing their last name to 'Thompson' to do so.
- As The Hurricane in the episode "Hurricane Neddy". Gray clouds appear, and the words "The Hurricane" in red letters come out in the same manner as the real opening. Similar vocals sing "The Hurricane", and then the letters are blown away to show parts of Springfield being destroyed.
- In "Simpsons Bible Stories", Bart is writing a chalkboard punishment in hieroglyphics when he hears Moses/Milhouse's horn being blown and leaves the classroom.
- As Three weeks later in "The Heartbroke Kid". Instead of writing on a chalkboard, a now overweight Bart is seen buying and eating chocolate from a vending machine. He cracks the pavement when he leaves the school, bends a lamppost, runs over pedestrians, hits Marge's car, sending it spinning off-screen, and crushes the roof of Homer's car, before stumbling into the living room having a heart attack.
- In "Little Big Girl", Bart is awarded a driver's license. Bart is seen at the chalkboard writing "So long suckers". He bursts through the school doors in Homer's car, instead of on his skateboard, and speeds away. Instead of dodging all the obstacles seen in the standard opening sequence, he runs them over. As Homer pulls into the driveway and steps out to enter the house, the other car lands on him, and Bart walks into the house.
- As The Outlands in "At Long Last Leave". In place of the chalkboard, Bart uses spray paint to vandalize a wall before leaving in a motorcycle. The family return home in a variety of ramshackle vehicles, before settling down on the couch to watch a sleeping fox.
- In "The Burns Cage", while Mr. Burns and Smithers are about to skydive out of an airplane, they fly over some clouds containing the yellow text from the opening sequence. The choral singing of "The Simpsons" briefly starts but then fades out as the letters disappear from view.

== Reception ==
The opening sequence has been picked many times as one of the best title sequences of all time on TV. In a 2010 issue of TV Guide, The Simpsons opening title sequence ranked #1 on a list of TV's top 10 credits sequences, as selected by readers. In 2017, James Charisma of Paste ranked the opening sequence #1 on a list of The 75 Best TV Title Sequences of All Time.

== Bibliography ==
- Turner, Chris (2004). Planet Simpson: How a Cartoon Masterpiece Documented an Era and Defined a Generation. Foreword by Douglas Coupland. (1st ed.). Toronto: Random House Canada. ISBN 978-0-679-31318-2. OCLC 55682258.
