= List of awards and nominations received by The Simpsons =

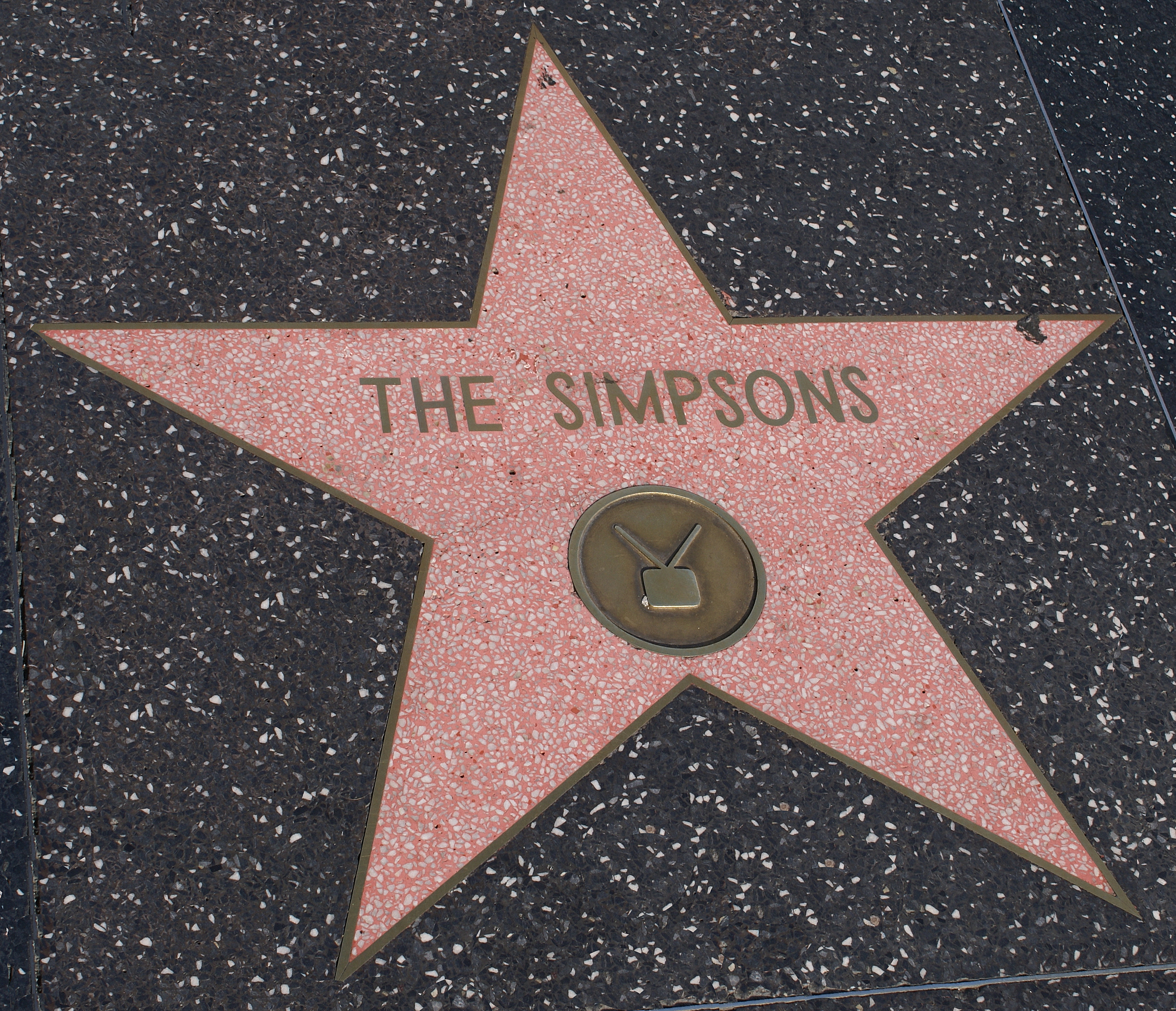
- The Simpsons were awarded a star on the Hollywood Walk of Fame.
The Simpsons
Award	Won
American Comedy Awards	1
Annie Awards	34
Australian Kids' Choice Awards	5
British Comedy Awards	3
Primetime Emmy Award	37
Environmental Media Awards	9
Genesis Awards	6
GLAAD Media Awards	1
Golden Reel Awards	1
Hollywood Walk of Fame	Awarded
International Monitor Awards	9
Kids' Choice Awards	2
Peabody Awards	2
People's Choice Awards	7
Satellite Awards	1
Saturn Awards	1
TCA Awards	2
Teen Choice Awards	5
UK Kids' Choice Awards	1
WGA Awards	13
Young Artist Awards	1
The Simpsons Movie
British Comedy Awards	1
Golden Trailer Awards	1
UK Kids' Choice Awards	1
National Movie Awards	1
- Total awards won
The Simpsons	120+
The Simpsons Movie	4
Guinness World Records	3
- Footnotes

The Simpsons is an American animated sitcom that debuted on December 17, 1989, on the Fox network. The show is the longest-running prime time scripted television series in the United States. It has won many different awards, including 36 Emmy awards, 34 Annie Awards, nine Environmental Media Awards, twelve Writers Guild of America Awards, six Genesis Awards, eight People's Choice Awards, three British Comedy Awards, among other awards. Episodes of the show have won 12 Emmys in the Primetime Emmy Award for Outstanding Animated Program (For Programming less than One Hour) category. However, The Simpsons has never been nominated for Outstanding Comedy Series, although the show was submitted in the category in 1993 and 1994. James L. Brooks, an executive producer on the show, won twelve Emmys for The Simpsons as well as ten for other shows and holds the record for most Primetime Emmys won by a single person, with 22, The Simpsons was the first animated series to be given a Peabody Award, won a second Peabody in 2020, and in 2000 the Simpson family was awarded a star on the Hollywood Walk of Fame. As of 2022, The Simpsons have received a total of 100 Emmy nominations.

The Simpsons Movie, released in 2007, was nominated for several major awards, including a Golden Globe Award, while The Longest Daycare, a short film released in 2012, became the franchise's first production to be nominated for an Academy Award.

The Simpsons also holds two world records from the Guinness World Records: Longest-Running Primetime Animated Television Series and Most Guest Stars Featured in a Television Series.

== Awards for The Simpsons ==
=== Annie Awards ===
First awarded in 1972, the Annie Awards are given exclusively to animated programs. The Simpsons has won 34 Annies, including 12 straight in the Best Animated Television Production category and winning in 2015 and 2016 for Best General Audience Animated TV/Broadcast Production.

Year	Category	Nominee	Result
1992	Best Animated Television Program		Won
1993	Best Animated Television Program		Won
1994	Best Animated Television Program		Won
1994	Best Individual Achievement for Creative Supervision in the Field of Animation	David Silverman	Nominated
1995	Best Animated Television Program		Won
1995	Voice Acting in the Field of Animation	Nancy Cartwright as Bart Simpson	Won
1996	Best Animated Television Program		Won
1997	Best Animated Television Program		Won
1997	Best Directing in a TV Production	Mike B. Anderson for "Homer's Phobia"	Won
1997	Best Music in a TV Production	Alf Clausen	Won
1997	Best Producing in a TV Production	Al Jean & Mike Reiss for "The Springfield Files"	Won
1997	Best Voice Acting by a Female Performer in a TV Production	Maggie Roswell for "Simpsoncalifragilisticexpiala(Annoyed Grunt)cious"	Nominated
1998	Outstanding Achievement in an Animated Primetime Program		Won
1998	Outstanding Music in an Animated Television Production	Alf Clausen & Ken Keeler for "You're Checkin' In" "The City of New York Vs. Homer Simpson"	Won
1998	Outstanding Directing in an Animated Television Production	Jim Reardon for "Trash of the Titans"	Won
1999	Outstanding Achievement in an Animated Television Program		Won
1999	Outstanding Writing in an Animated Television Production	Tim Long, Larry Doyle and Matt Selman for "Simpsons Bible Stories"	Won
2000	Outstanding Achievement in a Primetime Animated Television Program		Won
2000	Outstanding Music in an Animated Television Production	Alf Clausen for "Behind the Laughter"	Won
2001	Outstanding Achievement in a Primetime Animated Television Program		Won
2001	Outstanding Writing in an Animated Television Production	Al Jean for "HOMR"	Nominated
2002	Best Animated Television Production		Won
2003	Outstanding Achievement in an Animated Television Production		Won
2003	Best Directing in an Animated Television Production	Steven Dean Moore for "'Scuse Me While I Miss the Sky"	Won
2003	Best Music in an Animated Television Production	Alf Clausen, Ken Keeler and Ian Maxtone-Graham for "Dude, Where's My Ranch?"	Won
2003	Best Writing in an Animated Television Production	Matt Warburton for "Three Gays of the Condo"	Won
2006	Best Writing in an Animated Television Production	Ian Maxtone-Graham for "The Seemingly Never-Ending Story"	Won
2007	Best Music in an Animated Television Production	Alf Clausen & Michael Price for "Yokel Chords"	Won
2007	Best Writing in an Animated Television Production	Ian Maxtone-Graham & Billy Kimball for "24 Minutes"	Won
2008	Best Animated Television Production		Nominated
2008	Best Directing in an Animated Television Production	Bob Anderson for "Treehouse of Horror XIX"	Nominated
2008	Best Writing in an Animated Television Production	Joel H. Cohen for "The Debarted"	Nominated
2009	Best Animated Television Production		Nominated
2009	Best Writing in an Animated Television Production	Daniel Chun for "Treehouse of Horror XX"	Won
2009	Best Writing in an Animated Television Production	Valentina L. Garza for "Four Great Women and a Manicure"	Nominated
2009	Best Writing in an Animated Television Production	Ian Maxtone-Graham & Billy Kimball for "Gone Maggie Gone"	Nominated
2010	Best Animated Television Production		Nominated
2010	Directing in a Television Production	Bob Anderson	Nominated
2010	Music in a Television Production	Tim Long, Alf Clausen, Bret McKenzie and Jemaine Clement for "Elementary School Musical"	Nominated
2010	Writing in a Television Production	John Frink for "Stealing First Base"	Nominated
2011	Best General Audience Animated TV Production		Won
2011	Directing in a Television Production	Matthew Nastuk	Won
2011	Writing in a Television Production	Carolyn Omine for "Treehouse of Horror XXII"	Won
2012	Best Animated Short Subject	Bill Plympton Couch Gag in "Beware My Cheating Bart"	Nominated
2012	Music in an Animated Television or other Broadcast Venue Production	Alf Clausen for "Treehouse of Horror XXIII"	Nominated
2012	Production Design in an Animated Television or other Broadcast Venue Production	Lynna Blankenship, Sean Coons, Hugh Macdonald, Debbie Peterson, Charles Ragins, Lance Wilder, Darrel Bowen, John Krause, Kevin Moore, Brent M. Bowen, Brice Mallier, Steven Fahey, Dima; Malanitchev, Karen Bauer, Eli Balser and Anne Legge for "Moe Goes from Rags to Riches"	Nominated
2012	Writing in an Animated Television or other Broadcast Venue Production	Ian Maxtone-Graham and Billy Kimball for "How I Wet Your Mother"	Nominated
2012	Writing in an Animated Television or other Broadcast Venue Production	Stephanie Gillis for "A Tree Grows in Springfield"	Nominated
2013	Production Design in an Animated Television/Broadcast Production	Lynna Blankenship, Dima Malanitchev, Debbie Peterson, Charles Ragins, Jefferson R. Weekley for "Treehouse of Horror XXIV"	Nominated
2013	Storyboarding in an Animated Television/Broadcast Production	Guillermo del Toro, Guy Davis, Ralph Sosa for "Treehouse of Horror XXIV"	Nominated
2013	Writing in an Animated TV/Broadcast Production	Ian Maxtone-Graham & Billy Kimball	Nominated
2013	Writing in an Animated TV/Broadcast Production	Michael Price	Nominated
2014	Best Animated Short Subject	"Michal Socha Couch Gag" in "What to Expect When Bart's Expecting"	Nominated
2014	General Audience Animated Television/Broadcast Production		Won
2014	Directing in an Animated Television/Broadcast Production	Matthew Nastuk	Nominated
2014	Storyboarding in an Animated Television/Broadcast Production	Brad Ableson, Matthew Faughnan & Stephen Reis	Nominated
2014	Writing in an Animated Television/Broadcast Production	Tim Long for "Married to the Blob"	Nominated
2014	Writing in an Animated Television/Broadcast Production	Rob LaZebnik for "The War of Art"	Nominated
2015	Best General Audience Animated Television/Broadcast Production	"Halloween of Horror"	Won
2015	Writing in an Animated Television/Broadcast Production	Al Jean	Nominated
2016	Best General Audience Animated TV/Broadcast Production	"Barthood"	Nominated
2016	Writing in an Animated Television or other Broadcast Venue Production	Dan Greaney for "Barthood"	Nominated
2016	Writing in an Animated Television or other Broadcast Venue Production	Rob LaZebnik for "The Burns Cage"	Nominated
2017	Directing in an Animated Television/Broadcast Production	Timothy Bailey for "Treehouse of Horror XXVIII"	Nominated
2022	Best Mature Audience Animated Television/Broadcast Production	"Treehouse of Horror XXXIII"	Nominated
2024	Writing in an Animated Television/Broadcast Production	Jessica Conrad for "Bart's Birthday"	Nominated
2025	Character Animation in an Animated Television/Broadcast Production	Nik Ranieri for various episodes	Nominated

* denotes nominated works with awards pending presentation and announcement

=== British Comedy Awards ===
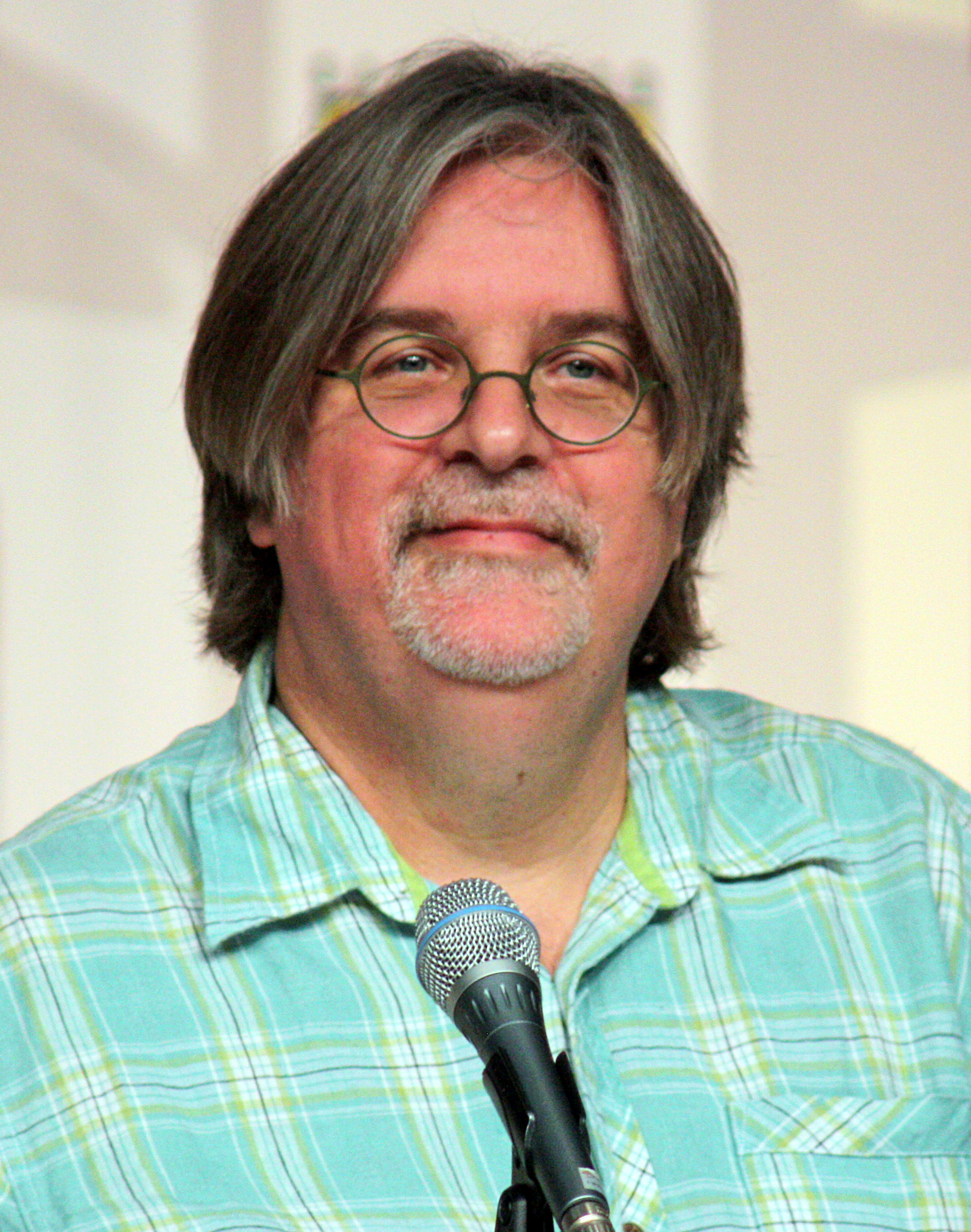
In 2004, Matt Groening won a Lifetime achievement British Comedy Award.

The Simpsons has won three British Comedy Awards. Matt Groening also won a special award for Outstanding Contribution to Comedy in 2004.

Year	Category	Result
2000	Best International Comedy Show	Won
2004	Best International Comedy Show	Won
2005	Best International Comedy Show	Won
2007	Best International Comedy	Nominated

=== Primetime Emmy Awards ===
The Simpsons has won 36 Primetime Emmy Awards in four categories, but has been nominated for 79 awards in nine different categories. Two of these nominations were for "Simpsons Roasting on an Open Fire", which was nominated in 1990 as a separate cartoon because officially it is considered a TV special and not a part of the series, however it is included in these statistics. The show's best year was 1992, when it won six Emmys, all for Outstanding Voice-Over Performance. Until 2009, the Outstanding Voice-Over Performance Emmy was awarded by a committee, so there were no nominations.

Prior to 1993, the series had only been allowed to compete in the animation category, but in early 1993 the rules were changed so that animated television shows would be able to submit nominations in the Outstanding Comedy Series category. The producers submitted "A Streetcar Named Marge" and "Mr. Plow" but the Emmy voters were hesitant to pit cartoons against live action programs, and The Simpsons did not receive a nomination. Several critics saw the show's failure to gain a nomination as one of the biggest snubs for that year. The Simpsons' crew again submitted episodes for "Outstanding Comedy Series" the next season, but these again were not nominated. Since then, the show has submitted episodes in the animation category.

==== Primetime Emmy Award for Outstanding Animated Program (For Programming less than One Hour) ====
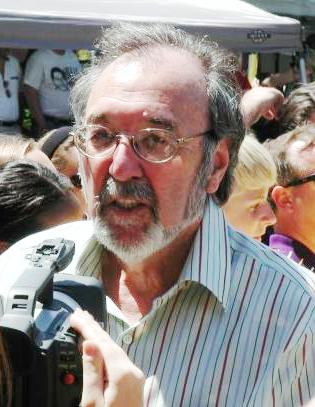
James L. Brooks has won twelve Emmys with The Simpsons.

The Simpsons won twelve out of thirty-three nominations, held the distinction as the highest wins and nominations of any animated series in the same category. It has been nominated for every year except 1993, 1994 and 2014; 1993 marked the first year that the producers of The Simpsons did not submit episodes for that category.

Year	Nominated episode	Result
1990	"Life on the Fast Lane"	Won
1990	"Simpsons Roasting on an Open Fire"	Nominated
1991	"Homer vs. Lisa and the 8th Commandment"	Won
1992	"Radio Bart"	Nominated
1995	"Lisa's Wedding"	Won
1996	"Treehouse of Horror VI"	Nominated
1997	"Homer's Phobia"	Won
1998	"Trash of the Titans"	Won
1999	"Viva Ned Flanders"	Nominated
2000	"Behind the Laughter"	Won
2001	"HOMR"	Won
2002	"She of Little Faith"	Nominated
2003	"Three Gays of the Condo"	Won
2004	"The Way We Weren't"	Nominated
2005	"Future-Drama"	Nominated
2006	"The Seemingly Never-Ending Story"	Won
2007	"The Haw-Hawed Couple"	Nominated
2008	"Eternal Moonshine of the Simpson Mind"	Won
2009	"Gone Maggie Gone"	Nominated
2010	"Once Upon a Time in Springfield"	Nominated
2011	"Angry Dad - The Movie"	Nominated
2012	"Holidays of Future Passed"	Nominated
2013	"Treehouse of Horror XXIII"	Nominated
2015	"Treehouse of Horror XXV"	Nominated
2016	"Halloween of Horror"	Nominated
2017	"The Town"	Nominated
2018	"Gone Boy"	Nominated
2019	"Mad About the Toy"	Won
2020	"Thanksgiving of Horror"	Nominated
2021	"The Dad-Feelings Limited"	Nominated
2022	"Pixelated and Afraid"	Nominated
2023	"Treehouse of Horror XXXIII"	Won
2024	"Night of the Living Wage"	Nominated
2025	"Bart's Birthday"	Nominated
2026	"Homer? A Cracker Bro?"	Nominated

==== Outstanding Voice-Over Performance ====
In 2014, the award was split into two different categories, Outstanding Character Voice-Over Performance and Outstanding Narrator. Nominations and wins in 2014 and after are in the Character Voice-Over category.

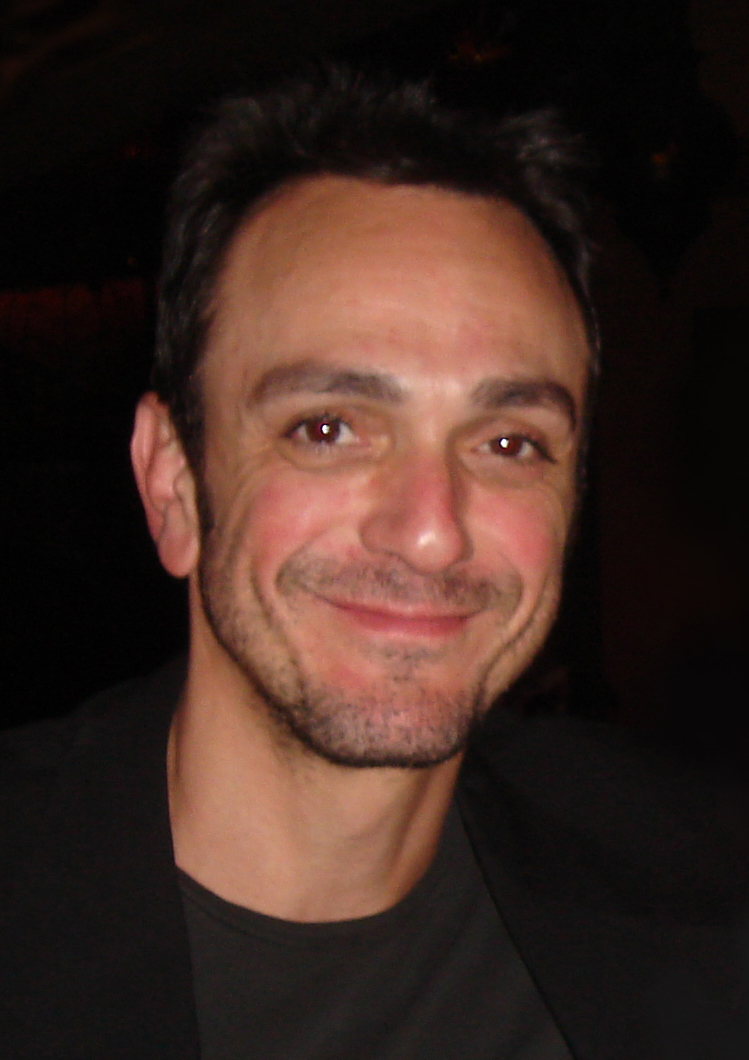
Hank Azaria has won four Emmy awards for Outstanding Voice-over Performance

Year	Winner	Character	Episode	Result
1992	Nancy Cartwright	Bart Simpson	"Separate Vocations"	Won
1992	Dan Castellaneta	Homer Simpson	"Lisa's Pony"	Won
1992	Julie Kavner	Marge Simpson	"I Married Marge"	Won
1992	Jackie Mason	Rabbi Hyman Krustofski	"Like Father, Like Clown"	Won
1992	Yeardley Smith	Lisa Simpson	"Lisa the Greek"	Won
1992	Marcia Wallace	Edna Krabappel	"Bart the Lover"	Won
1993	Dan Castellaneta	Homer Simpson	"Mr. Plow"	Won
1998	Hank Azaria	Apu Nahasapeemapetilon		Won
2001	Hank Azaria	Various Characters	"Worst Episode Ever"	Won
2003	Hank Azaria	Various Characters	"Moe Baby Blues"	Won
2004	Dan Castellaneta	Various Characters	"Today I am A Clown"	Won
2006	Kelsey Grammer	Sideshow Bob	"The Italian Bob"	Won
2009	Hank Azaria	Moe Szyslak	"Eeny Teeny Maya Moe"	Nominated
2009	Harry Shearer	Various	"The Burns and the Bees"	Nominated
2009	Dan Castellaneta	Homer Simpson	"Father Knows Worst"	Won
2010	Hank Azaria	Moe Szyslak; Apu Nahasapeemapetilon	"Moe Letter Blues"	Nominated
2010	Dan Castellaneta	Homer Simpson; Abraham Simpson	"Thursdays with Abie"	Nominated
2010	Anne Hathaway	Princess Penelope	"Once Upon a Time in Springfield"	Won
2011	Dan Castellaneta	Homer Simpson; Barney Gumble; Krusty the Clown; Louie	"Donnie Fatso"	Nominated
2012	Hank Azaria	Carl Carlson; Chief Wiggum; Comic Book Guy; Duffman; Mexican Duffman; Moe Szyslak	"Moe Goes from Rags to Riches"	Nominated
2014	Harry Shearer	Kent Brockman; Mr. Burns; Waylon Smithers	"Four Regrettings and a Funeral"	Won
2015	Hank Azaria	Moe Szyslak; Pedicab Driver	"The Princess Guide"	Won
2015	Dan Castellaneta	Homer Simpson	"Bart's New Friend"	Nominated
2015	Tress MacNeille	Laney Fontaine; Shauna; Mrs. Muntz	"My Fare Lady"	Nominated
2017	Nancy Cartwright	Bart Simpson	"Looking for Mr. Goodbart"	Nominated
2018	Dan Castellaneta	Homer Simpson; Krusty the Clown; Groundskeeper Willie; Sideshow Mel	"Fears of a Clown"	Nominated
2019	Hank Azaria	Moe Szyslak; Carl Carlson; Duffman; Kirk Van Houten	"From Russia Without Love"	Nominated
2020	Hank Azaria	Professor Frink; Moe; Chief Wiggum; Carl; Cletus; Kirk; Sea Captain	"Frinkcoin"	Nominated
2020	Nancy Cartwright	Bart Simpson; Nelson; Ralph; Todd	"Better Off Ned"	Nominated
2024	Hank Azaria	Moe Szyslak	"Cremains of the Day"	Nominated
2025	Hank Azaria	Moe Szyslak	"Abe League of Their Moe"	Nominated
2026	Hank Azaria	Superintendent Chalmers	"Keep Chalm and Gary On"	Nominated

==== Outstanding Music and Lyrics ====
Year	Song	Episode	Music by	Lyrics by	Result
1994	"Who Needs the Kwik-E-Mart?"	"Homer and Apu"	Alf Clausen	Greg Daniels	Nominated
1995	"We Do (The Stonecutters Song)"	"Homer the Great"	Alf Clausen	John Swartzwelder	Nominated
1996	"Señor Burns"	"Who Shot Mr. Burns? (Part Two)"	Alf Clausen	Bill Oakley & Josh Weinstein	Nominated
1997	"We Put the Spring in Springfield"	"Bart After Dark"	Alf Clausen	Ken Keeler	Won
1998	"You're Checkin' In"	"The City of New York vs. Homer Simpson"	Alf Clausen	Ken Keeler	Won
2002	"Ode to Branson"	"The Old Man and the Key"	Alf Clausen	Jon Vitti	Nominated
2003	"Everybody Hates Ned Flanders"	"Dude, Where's My Ranch?"	Alf Clausen	Ian Maxtone-Graham and Ken Keeler	Nominated
2004	"Vote for a Winner"	"The President Wore Pearls"	Alf Clausen	Dana Gould	Nominated
2005	"Always My Dad"	"A Star Is Torn"	Alf Clausen	Carolyn Omine	Nominated

==== Outstanding Music Composition for a Series (Dramatic Underscore) ====
Year	Episode	Composer	Result
1992	"Treehouse of Horror II"	Alf Clausen	Nominated
1993	"Treehouse of Horror III"	Alf Clausen	Nominated
1994	"Cape Feare"	Alf Clausen	Nominated
1995	"Treehouse of Horror V"	Alf Clausen	Nominated
1998	"Treehouse of Horror VIII"	Alf Clausen	Nominated
1999	"Treehouse of Horror IX"	Alf Clausen	Nominated
2001	"Simpson Safari"	Alf Clausen	Nominated
2004	"Treehouse of Horror XIV"	Alf Clausen	Nominated
2005	"Treehouse of Horror XV"	Alf Clausen	Nominated
2008	"Treehouse of Horror XVIII"	Alf Clausen	Nominated
2009	"Gone Maggie Gone"	Alf Clausen	Nominated
2011	"Treehouse of Horror XXI"	Alf Clausen	Nominated

==== Outstanding Music Direction ====
Year	Episode	Music director	Result
1997	"Simpsoncalifragilisticexpiala(Annoyed Grunt)cious"	Alf Clausen	Nominated
1998	"All Singing, All Dancing"	Alf Clausen	Nominated

==== Outstanding Main Title Theme Music ====
Year	Song	Composer	Result
1990	Main Title Theme	Danny Elfman	Nominated

==== Outstanding Sound Mixing for a Comedy Series or a Special ====
Year	Episode	Result
1990	"Call of the Simpsons"	Nominated
1991	"Homer vs. Lisa and the 8th Commandment"	Nominated
1992	"Treehouse of Horror II"	Nominated
1993	"Treehouse of Horror III"	Nominated
1995	"Bart vs. Australia"	Nominated
1997	"Brother from Another Series"	Nominated

==== Outstanding Sound Mixing for a Comedy or Drama Series (Half-Hour) and Animation ====
Year	Episode	Result
2014	"Married To The Blob"	Nominated
2015	"Simpsorama"	Nominated
2016	"Halloween of Horror"	Nominated

==== Outstanding Editing for a Miniseries or a Special ====
Year	Episode	Result
1990	"Simpsons Roasting on an Open Fire"	Nominated

==== Outstanding Individual Achievement in Animation ====
Year	Episode	Animator	Result
2010	"Postcards from the Wedge"	Charles Ragins	Won
2013	"Treehouse of Horror XXIII"	Paul Wee	Won
2014	"Treehouse of Horror XXIV"	Dmitry Malanitchev (Color Design Director)	Won
2014	"Treehouse of Horror XXIV"	Charles Ragins (Background Designer)	Won
2018	"Springfield Splendor"	Caroline Cruikshank (Character Animator)	Won
2021	"Wad Goals"	Nik Ranieri (Lead Character Layout Artist)	Won
2023	"Lisa the Boy Scout"	Nik Ranieri (Character Layout)	Won

==== Outstanding Short Form Animated Program ====
Year	Episode	Result
2021	The Force Awakens from Its Nap	Nominated
2022	When Billie Met Lisa	Nominated

=== Environmental Media Awards ===
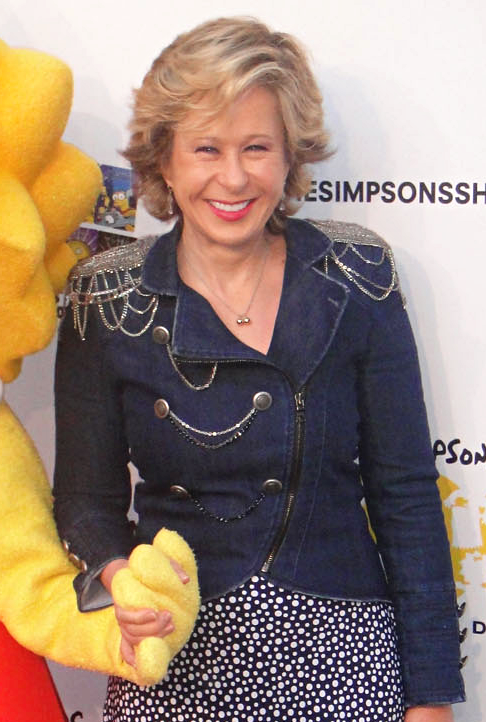
In 2001, Yeardley Smith's character Lisa Simpson won an EMA Award.

The Simpsons has won nine Environmental Media Awards. All of the wins and most of their nominations were in the Best Television Episodic Comedy category, including 2016 for "Teenage Mutant Milk-Caused Hurdles" but the series received a nomination for the Turner Award in 2005, which is given to "the scripted, primetime television episode that best deals with the issue of population growth and responsibility".

Year	Category	Episode/Character	Result
1991	Best Television Episodic Comedy	"Two Cars in Every Garage and Three Eyes on Every Fish"	Won
1992	Best Television Episodic Comedy	"Mr. Lisa Goes to Washington"	Nominated
1994	Best Television Episodic Comedy	"Bart Gets an Elephant"	Won
1996	Best Television Episodic Comedy	"Lisa the Vegetarian"	Won
1997	Best Television Episodic Comedy	"The Old Man and the Lisa"	Won
2001	board of directors Ongoing Commitment Award	Lisa Simpson	Won
2002	Best Television Episodic Comedy	"Brawl in the Family"	Nominated
2003	Best Television Episodic Comedy	"'Scuse Me While I Miss the Sky"	Nominated
2004	Best Television Episodic Comedy	"The Fat and the Furriest"	Won
2005	Best Television Episodic Comedy	"On a Clear Day I Can't See My Sister"	Nominated
2005	Turner Award	"Goo Goo Gai Pan"	Nominated
2006	Best Television Episodic Comedy	"Bonfire of the Manatees"	Won
2007	Best Television Episodic Comedy	"The Wife Aquatic"	Nominated
2009	Best Television Episodic Comedy	"The Burns and the Bees"	Nominated
2015	Best Television Episodic Comedy	"Opposites A-Frack"	Won

=== Genesis Awards ===
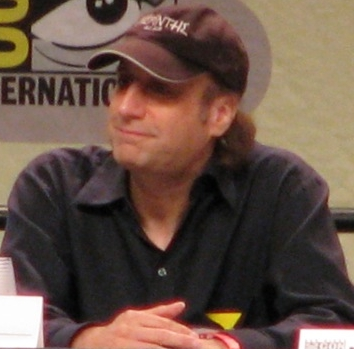
"Lisa the Vegetarian", an episode produced by David Mirkin, won a Genesis Award in 1996

The Genesis Awards are given out annually by the Humane Society of the United States "to the news and entertainment media for shining that spotlight into the darkest corners of animal abuse and exploitation."

Year	Category	Episode	Result
1993	Best Television Comedy Series		Won
1994	Best Television Prime Time Animated Series	"Whacking Day"	Won
1995	Best Television Comedy Series	"Bart Gets an Elephant"	Won
1996	Best Television Comedy Series, Ongoing Commitment	"Lisa the Vegetarian"	Won
2007	Sid Caesar Comedy Award	"Million Dollar Abie"	Won
2009	Sid Caesar Comedy Award	"Apocalypse Cow"	Won

=== Golden Reel Awards ===
The Golden Reel Awards are presented annually by the Motion Picture Sound Editors. The Simpsons has been nominated in the Best Sound Editing in Television Animation – Music category five times. In 1998, the show was nominated for Best Sound Editing – Television Animated Specials, and won.

Year	Nominees	Episode	Result
1998	Robert Mackston, Travis Powers; Norm MacLeod & Terry Greene	"Treehouse of Horror VIII"	Won
1999			Nominated
2000	Bob Beecher	"Treehouse of Horror X"	Nominated
2000	Chris Ledesma	"Wild Barts Can't Be Broken"	Nominated
2001	Bob Beecher	"Last Tap Dance in Springfield"	Nominated
2003	Chris Ledesma	"Large Marge"	Nominated

=== People's Choice Awards ===
Year	Category	Result
1991	Favorite New TV Comedy Series	Won
1992	Favorite Series Among Young People	Nominated
2006	Favorite TV Comedy Series	Nominated
2007	Favorite Animated Comedy	Won
2008	Favorite Animated Comedy	Won
2009	Favorite Animated Comedy	Won
2011	Favorite TV Family	Won
2012	Favorite Cartoon Show	Nominated
2013	Favorite Cartoon Show	Nominated
2015	Favorite Animated TV Show	Won
2016	Favorite Animated TV Show	Won
2017	Favorite Animated TV Show	Won

=== Writers Guild of America Awards ===
The Simpsons has won thirteen Writers Guild of America Awards. The Animation category was introduced in 2003, and although the Futurama episode "Godfellas" won it in 2003, The Simpsons began to dominate the category, winning the award from 2004 to 2010 and 2012 to 2015, receiving a total of 57 nominations in the category. In 2008, three of the series' writers received a nomination for Video game writing. In 2009, the writers received their first nomination in the comedy series category. In 2011, the show's writers received two nominations in the category, and lost the award to Futurama's "The Prisoner of Benda". In 2012 the show received four nominations, and Joel H. Cohen won his second WGA award for "Homer the Father". In 2013 the show received three nominations, and Jeff Westbrook won his third WGA award for "Ned 'n' Edna's Blend Agenda". In 2014 the show received three nominations and Joel H. Cohen won his third WGA award for "A Test Before Trying". In 2015 Brian Kelley won for "Brick Like Me". In 2019 Stephanie Gillis won for "Bart’s Not Dead". In 2020 Dan Vebber won for "Thanksgiving of Horror". In 2005 Don Payne won the Paul Selvin Award for "Fraudcast News".

In 2006, long time writers Al Jean and Mike Reiss were given the Animation Writers Caucus Animation Award which is given to writers that "advanced the literature of animation in film and/or television through the years and who has made outstanding contributions to the profession of the animation writer." In 2010 long-time writer Mike Scully received this award, and in 2012 series creator Matt Groening received the award. In 2013, series co-developer and long-time Executive Producer Sam Simon received this honor.

==== Animation ====
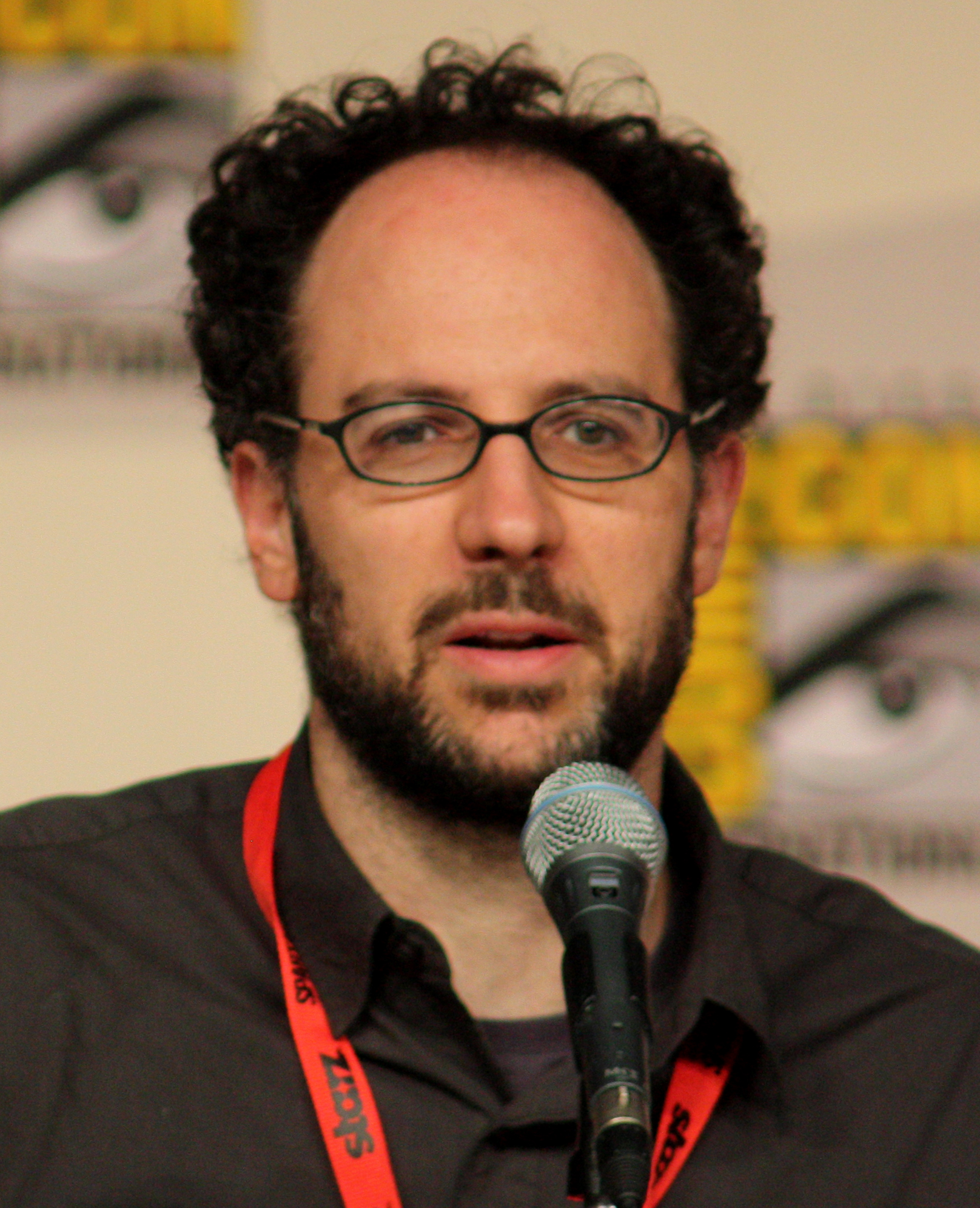
Matt Selman won a WGA Award in 2004.

Year	Episode	Writer(s)	Result
2003	"Blame It on Lisa"	Bob Bendetson	Nominated
2003	"The Bart Wants What It Wants"	John Frink & Don Payne	Nominated
2003	"Jaws Wired Shut"	Matt Selman	Nominated
2004	"The Dad Who Knew Too Little"	Matt Selman	Won
2004	"Moe Baby Blues"	J. Stewart Burns	Nominated
2004	"My Mother the Carjacker"	Michael Price	Nominated
2005	"Catch 'Em If You Can"	Ian Maxtone-Graham	Won
2005	"Fraudcast News"	Don Payne	Nominated
2005	"Milhouse Doesn't Live Here Anymore"	Julie Chambers & David Chambers	Nominated
2005	"Today I Am a Clown"	Joel H. Cohen	Nominated
2006	"Mommie Beerest"	Michael Price	Won
2006	"The Father, the Son, and the Holy Guest Star"	Matt Warburton	Nominated
2006	"The Girl Who Slept Too Little"	John Frink	Nominated
2006	"See Homer Run"	Stephanie Gillis	Nominated
2006	"Thank God It's Doomsday"	Don Payne	Nominated
2006	"There's Something About Marrying"	J. Stewart Burns	Nominated
2007	"The Italian Bob"	John Frink	Won
2007	"Girls Just Want to Have Sums"	Matt Selman	Nominated
2007	"Kiss Kiss, Bang Bangalore"	Dan Castellaneta & Deb Lacusta	Nominated
2007	"Simpsons Christmas Stories"	Don Payne	Nominated
2008	"Kill Gil: Vols. 1 & 2"	Jeff Westbrook	Won
2008	"The Haw-Hawed Couple"	Matt Selman	Nominated
2008	"The Homer of Seville"	Carolyn Omine	Nominated
2008	"Stop, or My Dog Will Shoot!"	John Frink	Nominated
2009	"Apocalypse Cow"	Jeff Westbrook	Won
2009	"The Debarted"	Joel H. Cohen	Nominated
2009	"E Pluribus Wiggum"	Michael Price	Nominated
2009	"Homer and Lisa Exchange Cross Words"	Tim Long	Nominated
2010	"Wedding for Disaster"	Joel H. Cohen	Won
2010	"The Burns and the Bees"	Stephanie Gillis	Nominated
2010	"Eeny Teeny Maya Moe"	John Frink	Nominated
2010	"Gone Maggie Gone"	Billy Kimball & Ian Maxtone-Graham	Nominated
2010	"Take My Life, Please"	Don Payne	Nominated
2011	"Moe Letter Blues"	Stephanie Gillis	Nominated
2011	"O Brother, Where Bart Thou?"	Matt Selman	Nominated
2012	"Homer the Father"	Joel H. Cohen	Won
2012	"Bart Stops to Smell the Roosevelts"	Tim Long	Nominated
2012	"The Blue and the Gray"	Rob LaZebnik	Nominated
2012	"Donnie Fatso"	Chris Cluess	Nominated
2013	"Ned 'N' Edna's Blend Agenda"	Jeff Westbrook	Won
2013	"Holidays of Future Passed"	J. Stewart Burns	Nominated
2013	"Treehouse of Horror XXIII"	David Mandel & Brian Kelley	Nominated
2014	"A Test Before Trying"	Joel H. Cohen	Won
2014	"Hardly Kirk-ing"	Tom Gammill and Max Pross	Nominated
2014	"YOLO"	Michael Nobori	Nominated
2015	"Brick Like Me"	Brian Kelley	Won
2015	"Covercraft"	Matt Selman	Nominated
2015	"Pay Pal"	David H. Steinberg	Nominated
2015	"Steal This Episode"	J. Stewart Burns	Nominated
2016	"Halloween of Horror"	Carolyn Omine	Nominated
2016	"Sky Police"	Matt Selman	Nominated
2016	"Walking Big & Tall"	Michael Price	Nominated
2017	"Barthood"	Dan Greaney	Nominated
2018	"A Father's Watch"	Simon Rich	Nominated
2018	"The Serfsons"	Brian Kelley	Nominated
2019	"Bart's Not Dead"	Stephanie Gillis	Won
2019	"Krusty the Clown"	Ryan Koh	Nominated
2020	"Thanksgiving of Horror"	Dan Vebber	Won
2020	"Go Big or Go Homer"	John Frink	Nominated
2020	"Livin La Pura Vida"	Brian Kelley	Nominated
2021	"Bart the Bad Guy"	Dan Vebber	Nominated
2021	"I, Carumbus"	Cesar Mazariegos	Nominated
2021	"Three Dreams Denied"	Danielle Weisberg	Nominated
2021	"A Springfield Summer Christmas for Christmas"	Jessica Conrad	Nominated
2022	"The Star of the Backstage"	Elisabeth Kiernan Averick	Nominated
2022	"Portrait of a Lackey on Fire"	Rob LaZebnik & Johnny LaZebnik	Nominated
2023	"Girls Just Shauna Have Fun"	Jeff Westbrook	Nominated
2023	"Pixelated and Afraid"	John Frink	Nominated
2023	"The Sound of Bleeding Gums"	Loni Steele Sosthand	Nominated
2024	"Carl Carlson Rides Again"	Loni Steele Sosthand	Won
2024	"A Mid-Childhood Night's Dream"	Carolyn Omine	Nominated
2024	"Homer's Adventures Through the Windshield Glass"	Tim Long	Nominated
2024	"Thirst Trap: A Corporate Love Story"	Rob LaZebnik	Nominated
2025	"Bottle Episode"	Rob LaZebnik & Johnny LaZebnik	Nominated
2025	"Cremains of the Day"	John Frink	Nominated
2025	"Night of the Living Wage"	Cesar Mazariegos	Nominated
2026	"Abe League of Their Moe"	Joel H. Cohen	Nominated
2026	"Parahormonal Activity"	Loni Steele Sosthand	Nominated

==== Comedy series ====
Year	Writer(s)	Result
2009	J. Stewart Burns, Daniel Chun, Joel H. Cohen, Kevin Curran, John Frink; Tom Gammill, Stephanie Gillis, Dan Greaney, Reid Harrison, Al Jean; Billy Kimball, Tim Long, Ian Maxtone-Graham, Bill Odenkirk, Carolyn Omine; Don Payne, Michael Price, Max Pross, Mike Reiss, Mike Scully; Matt Selman, Matt Warburton, Jeff Westbrook, Marc Wilmore and William Wright	Nominated

==== Paul Selvin award ====
Year	Episode	Writer(s)	Result
2005	"Fraudcast News"	Don Payne	Won

==== Video game writing ====
Year	Nominees	Game	Result
2008	Matt Selman, Tim Long, Matt Warburton and Jeff Poliquin	The Simpsons Game	Nominated

=== Other awards ===
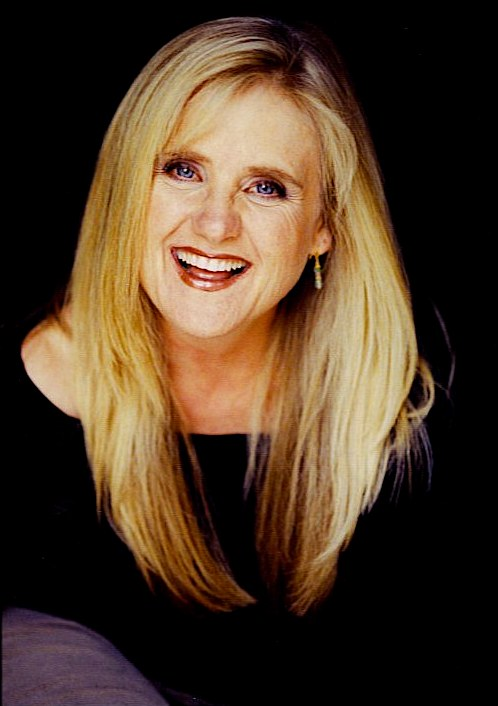
In 1991, Nancy Cartwright accepted a Kids' Choice Awards while wearing a Bart Simpson costume.

In 1997, The Simpsons became the first animated series to win a Peabody Award, and won it "for providing exceptional animation and stinging social satire, both commodities which are in extremely short supply in television today." In 2020 The Simpsons won a Peabody Institutional Award. In 2000, The Simpsons were given a star on the Hollywood Walk of Fame. This applies to The Simpsons in person, not the series. The star is located at 7021 Hollywood Blvd.

The Simpsons has never won a Golden Globe Award, but was nominated in 2002 in the Best Television Series – Musical or Comedy category, which it would lose to Curb Your Enthusiasm. In 1998, the series was nominated for a British Academy Television Awards in the Best International Programme Or Series category, but would lose to The Larry Sanders Show. In 1996, the "Homer³" segment of "Treehouse of Horror VI" was awarded the Ottawa International Animation Festival grand prize.

Year	Award	Category	Nominee	Result
2004	Australian Kids' Choice Awards	Fave Video Game	The Simpsons: Hit & Run	Won
2004	Australian Kids' Choice Awards	Fave TV show		Won
2005	Australian Kids' Choice Awards	Fave TV show		Won
2006	Australian Kids' Choice Awards	Fave Toon		Won
2007	Australian Kids' Choice Awards	Fave Toon		Won
2008	Australian Kids' Choice Awards	Fave Toon		Nominated
2009	Australian Kids' Choice Awards	Fave Toon		Nominated
2001	American Comedy Award	Funniest Animated Series		Won
1998	British Academy Television Award	Best International Programme or Series		Nominated
2000	CINE Golden Eagle Award		"Treehouse of Horror X"	Won
2013	Critics' Choice Television Awards	Best Animated Series		Nominated
2014	Critics' Choice Television Awards	Best Animated Series		Nominated
2015	Critics' Choice Television Awards	Best Animated Series		Nominated
2016	Critics' Choice Television Awards	Best Animated Series		Nominated
2016	Critics' Choice Television Awards	Best Animated Series		Nominated
2018	Critics' Choice Television Awards	Best Animated Series		Nominated
2019	Critics' Choice Television Awards	Best Animated Series		Nominated
2020	Critics' Choice Television Awards	Best Animated Series		Nominated
1997	GLAAD Media Award	Outstanding TV – Individual Episode	"Homer's Phobia"	Won
2002	Golden Globe Award	Best Television Series – Musical or Comedy		Nominated
2009	Image Awards	Outstanding Writing in a Comedy Series	Marc Wilmore "Mypods and Boomsticks"	Nominated
2010	Image Awards	Outstanding Writing in a Comedy Series	Marc Wilmore "The Good, the Sad and the Drugly"	Nominated
1996	Kids' Choice Awards	Favorite Cartoon		Nominated
1997	Kids' Choice Awards	Favorite Cartoon		Nominated
1998	Kids' Choice Awards	Favorite Cartoon		Nominated
1999	Kids' Choice Awards	Favorite Cartoon		Nominated
2000	Kids' Choice Awards	Favorite Cartoon		Nominated
2001	Kids' Choice Awards	Favorite Cartoon		Nominated
2002	Kids' Choice Awards	Favorite Cartoon		Won
2003	Kids' Choice Awards	Favorite Cartoon		Nominated
2004	Kids' Choice Awards	Favorite Cartoon		Nominated
2005	Kids' Choice Awards	Favorite Cartoon		Nominated
2006	Kids' Choice Awards	Favorite Cartoon		Nominated
2007	Kids' Choice Awards	Favorite Cartoon		Nominated
2008	Kids' Choice Awards	Favorite Cartoon		Nominated
2009	Kids' Choice Awards	Favorite Cartoon		Nominated
2010	Kids' Choice Awards	Favorite Cartoon		Nominated
2018	Kids' Choice Awards	Favorite Cartoon		Nominated
2020	Kids' Choice Awards	Favorite Animated Series		Nominated
2024	Kids' Choice Awards	Favorite Cartoon		Nominated
2025	Kids' Choice Awards	Favorite Cartoon		Nominated
1996	Peabody Award	Entertainment		Won
2019	Peabody Award	Institutional Award		Won
2012	Neox Fan Awards	Best Television Series		Nominated
2013	Neox Fan Awards	Best Television Series		Nominated
2013	Neox Fan Awards	Best Neox Character	Bart Simpson	Won
2015	Neox Fan Awards	Best Television Series		Nominated
2006	Satellite Award	Best DVD Release of a TV Show	"The Simpsons: The Complete Eighth Season" DVD boxset	Won
2008	Satellite Award	Best DVD Release of a TV Show	"The Simpsons: The Complete Eleventh Season" DVD boxset	Nominated
1993	Saturn Award	Best Television Series		Won
2017	Saturn Award	Best Animated Series or Film on Television		Nominated
2018	Saturn Award	Best Animated Series or Film on Television		Nominated
1990	TCA Award	Outstanding Achievement in Comedy		Won
2002	TCA Award	Heritage Award		Won
2006	Teen Choice Awards	Choice TV: Animated Show		Nominated
2007	Teen Choice Awards	Choice TV: Animated Show		Won
2008	Teen Choice Awards	Choice TV: Animated Show		Nominated
2009	Teen Choice Awards	Choice TV: Animated Show		Nominated
2011	Teen Choice Awards	Choice TV: Animated Show		Won
2012	Teen Choice Awards	Choice TV: Animated Show		Won
2013	Teen Choice Awards	Choice TV: Animated Show		Won
2014	Teen Choice Awards	Choice TV: Animated Show		Won
2007	UK Kids' Choice Awards	Best Cartoon		Won
2002	Young Artist Award	Best Family TV Comedy Series		Nominated
2004	Young Artist Award	Most Popular Mom & Dad in a TV Series	Julie Kavner & Dan Castellaneta	Won
2004	Young Artist Award	Best Family TV Comedy Series		Nominated

== Awards for The Simpsons Movie ==
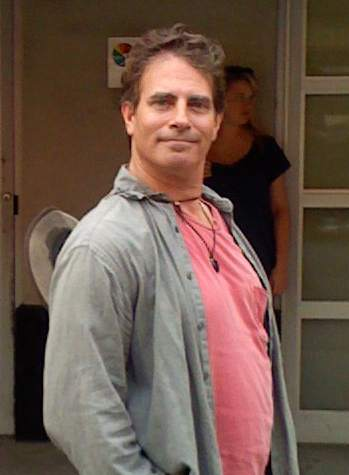
David Silverman, director of The Simpsons Movie.

The Simpsons Movie was released on July 27, 2007, and has been a financial success, grossing over $500,000,000 worldwide.

Year	Award	Category	Nominee(s)	Result
2007	Annie Awards	Best Animated Feature		Nominated
2007	Annie Awards	Best Directing in an Animated Feature	David Silverman	Nominated
2007	Annie Awards	Best Voice Acting in an Animated Feature	Julie Kavner for Marge Simpson	Nominated
2007	Annie Awards	Best Writing in an Animated Feature	James L. Brooks, Matt Groening, Al Jean, Ian Maxtone-Graham, George Meyer; David Mirkin, Mike Reiss, Mike Scully, Matt Selman, John Swartzwelder & Jon Vitti	Nominated
2008	BAFTA Awards	Best Animated Film	Matt Groening, James L. Brooks	Nominated
2007	British Comedy Awards	Best Comedy Film		Won
2007	Critics' Choice Awards	Best Animated Feature		Nominated
2007	CFCA Awards	Best Animated Feature		Nominated
2008	Environmental Media Awards	Best Feature Film		Nominated
2007	Golden Globe Award	Best Animated Feature		Nominated
2008	Golden Reel Awards	Best Sound Editing in Film: Animated		Nominated
2007	Golden Trailer Awards	Best Animated/Family Film Trailer		Won
2007	ITV National Movie Awards	Best Animation		Won
2008	Kids' Choice Awards	Favorite Animated Movie		Nominated
2007	MTV Movie Awards	Best Summer Movie You Haven't Seen Yet		Nominated
2007	Online Film Critics Society Awards	Best Animated Feature		Nominated
2008	People's Choice Awards	Favorite Movie Comedy		Nominated
2007	Producers Guild Awards	Animated Theatrical Motion Pictures	James L. Brooks, Matt Groening; Al Jean, Richard Sakai & Mike Scully	Nominated
2007	Satellite Awards	Best Motion Picture, Animated or Mixed Media		Nominated
2008	Saturn Awards	Best Animated Film		Nominated
2007	Teen Choice Awards	Choice Summer Movie – Comedy/Musical		Nominated
2007	UK Kids' Choice Awards	Best Movie		Won

== Awards for The Longest Daycare ==
The Longest Daycare is a 3D, short film starring Maggie Simpson, which was shown prior to screenings of Ice Age: Continental Drift, on July 13, 2012, in the United States.

Year	Award	Category	Nominee(s)	Result
2013	Annie Awards	Best Animated Short Subject		Nominated
2013	Academy Awards	Best Animated Short Film	David Silverman	Nominated
