= The Serfsons =

- The Simpsons episode
- Promotional poster
- Episode no.: Season 29; Episode 1
- Directed by: Rob Oliver
- Written by: Brian Kelley
- Production code: WABF17
- Original air date: October 1, 2017

Guest appearances
- Billy Boyd as singer of "The Perfect Tale" (parody of the song The Last Goodbye); Nikolaj Coster-Waldau as Markery

Episode chronology
← Previous "Dogtown"	Next → "Springfield Splendor"
- The Simpsons season 29

"The Serfsons" is the twenty-ninth season premiere of the American animated television series The Simpsons, and the 619th episode of the series overall. The episode was directed by Rob Oliver and written by Brian Kelley. It aired in the United States on Fox on October 1, 2017.

The episode places the citizens of Springfield in a medieval fantasy kingdom called Springfieldia, where the Simpson family are serfs known as the Serfsons. Billy Boyd and Nikolaj Coster-Waldau guest starred. The episode received mixed reviews.

This is the first Simpsons episode to be scored by composing team Bleeding Fingers Music since longtime composer Alf Clausen, who had scored the show since 1990, was dismissed from that position in August 2017. To date, this episode marks the final time that Apu is voiced by series cast member Hank Azaria before being recasted to Sunil Malhotra in 2026 and is the last dub of Homer's French-Canadian voice actor Hubert Gagnon following health issues, resulting in his death on June 7, 2020.

== Plot ==
In the kingdom of Springfieldia, the Serfsons visit Jacqueline Bouvier at The Webs at Giant Spider Acres, a retirement forest, where Marge discovers, to her shock, that Jacqueline is freezing over.

At Barber Hibbert's Surgery, Jacqueline is found with progressive frozen mortification after having been bitten by an ice walker, which converts the victim's flesh to ice in the span of a week. To save her, he proposes a treatment, buying an Amulet of Warmfyre. However the cost for it is too high, and Marge sends Homer to grab the necessary money. Azzlan appears trying to get the Serfsons to convert to Christianity only to be driven away by Marge.

At the Springfieldia Human Power Plant, Homer attempts, unsuccessfully, to ask Lord Montgomery for the money. Seeing her father's plight, Lisa solves the problem by magically converting lead into gold. However, Lisa cannot perform magic in public as then she would be taken by King Quimby and be forced to become one of his evil wizards.

At home, Marge gives the amulet to Jacqueline, who refuses at first, recognizing the futility of life, though she decides to wear it. At that moment, King Quimby's wizards appear and take Lisa away, charging her with witchcraft. To rescue her, Homer rallies the town's peasants into revolt. Upon scaling the castle, the peasants defeat King Quimby's wizards only to face a dragon. Jacqueline decides to remove the amulet, turning her into a human composed of ice, and sacrifice herself to defeat the dragon in which she succeeds. However, it is revealed that the dragon was the source of all magic in the kingdom including all magical creatures. Lisa suggests that the kingdom can now base their lives on science, to everyone's dismay. Homer decides to light coals in an attempt to revive the dragon. This succeeds only for the dragon to burn the village down.

== Production and cultural references ==
Executive producer Matt Selman described the episode as a love letter to the fantasy genre portrayed in different forms of media. In July 2017, Entertainment Weekly reported that Nikolaj Coster-Waldau would guest star in the episode as a character similar to Jaime Lannister, his character in the television series Game of Thrones. This episode marked the last time Hank Azaria voiced the character Apu following the controversy surrounding the character. Apu had remained silent for nine years until "Treehouse of Horror Presents: The Revengening", where he was recast with Sunil Malhotra.

Dissatisfied with composer Alf Clausen's work, executive producer James L. Brooks attempted to hire composer Hans Zimmer, who worked on the 2007 film The Simpsons Movie, before hiring composer collective Bleeding Fingers Music, which was founded by Zimmer, and the producers fired Clausen. He is credited as composer emeritus starting with this episode.

=== Supposed prediction ===
In May 2019, several media outlets reported that this episode predicted the plot of the penultimate episode of Game of Thrones. "The Serfsons" ends with the violent burning of the village, similar to how the aforementioned episode ends.

== Reception ==
=== Viewing figures ===
"The Serfsons" scored a 1.4 rating with a 5 score and was watched by 3.26 million people, making it Fox's second highest rated show of the night.

=== Critical response ===
Dennis Perkins of The A.V. Club gave the episode a B− stating, "’The Serfsons’ is, for what it is, a serviceable goof of an episode whose biggest flaw is its utter disposability, especially as a way to kick off the new season. The show has done a gimmick episode as a season premiere more than once, and they’re perhaps intended to snag viewers with a few unambitious pop culture references. Fair enough. ‘The Serfsons’, on its own, has a healthy handful of such things, as—dispensing with any framing device or rationale for the fanciful outing—The Simpson family is the downtrodden peasant Serfson family in sort of a 'Game of Thrones', 'Lord of the Rings', 'Dungeons & Dragons' mashup extravaganza."

Tony Sokol of Den of Geek gave the episode 4 out of 5 stars. He highlighted the pacing and jokes but said it was only a mild parody of Game of Thrones.

Jesse Schedeen of IGN gave the episode a 6.2 out of 10. He wondered how the episode would fare if it parodied a single franchise as opposed to a whole genre. He also felt the conflict between Marge and her mother was wasted on a fantasy episode.

=== Awards and nominations ===
Brian Kelley was nominated for a Writers Guild of America Award for Outstanding Writing in Animation at the 70th Writers Guild of America Awards for his script to this episode.
