= Homer Is Where the Art Isn't =

- The Simpsons episode
- Episode no.: Season 29; Episode 12
- Directed by: Timothy Bailey
- Written by: Kevin Curran
- Production code: XABF05
- Original air date: March 18, 2018

Guest appearances
- Bill Hader as Detective Manacek; Cecily Strong as Megan Matheson

Episode chronology
← Previous "Frink Gets Testy"	Next → "3 Scenes Plus a Tag from a Marriage"
- The Simpsons season 29

"Homer Is Where the Art Isn't" is the twelfth episode of the twenty-ninth season of the American animated television series The Simpsons, and the 630th episode overall. The episode was directed by Timothy Bailey and written by Kevin Curran. It aired in the United States on the Fox Network on March 18, 2018. In the episode, Manacek is hired to investigate the theft of a painting where Homer is one of the suspects. Bill Hader and Cecily Strong guest starred. The episode received several positive reviews.

It is the final episode of the series to be written by long time writer Kevin Curran, who died in 2016. The episode is dedicated to guest voice actor Stephen Hawking, who died four days before the episode's airing.

== Plot ==
At Gavelby's Auction House, Homer and Mr. Burns lose to tech mogul Megan Matheson at bidding for Joan Miró's painting The Poetess, with which Homer is obsessed and attempts to steal at the end of the auction. Once the crate with the painting arrives at her home, Megan finds it empty. Detective Manacek is called to solve the case. Manacek accuses Megan because she insured the painting for double the price she paid. She denies the accusation and sends Manacek to Burns' mansion. Although he cannot stand losing to a woman, he dismisses the accusation and sends Manacek to Homer, due to his obsession. Homer demonstrates how much he wants the painting but denies stealing it. In the evening, Marge appears at Manacek's apartment to convince him Homer is innocent. Manacek will only talk with her over dinner, so Marge invites him to dinner at her house.

After dinner, Homer panics as Manacek and Marge discuss his alleged crime. She and the children explain how Homer became obsessed with the painting at the Springfield Museum of Fine Arts while chaperoning a field trip. He could not stop thinking about it. Homer confided in Lisa about the painting, forming a common interest between them. They went to the museum, but found it closed after running out of funds and the painting shipped off to an auction house. Homer entered the auction in a bid to save the painting but failed. After the story, Homer escapes, but Manacek finds him at the museum where he assures Homer that he is innocent because he is too dumb to steal anything.

Manacek gathers all the suspects and reveals the events that led to the painting being stolen. Megan hired the identical twins of the security guards to rob their brothers so she could collect the insurance policy for her girlfriend. However, Burns already stole it from the vault after he built an identical auction house next to the original. Unbeknownst to Burns, the painting was already switched with a tote bag by Lisa, who stole it to prevent it from being taken to a mansion and hidden away from people who love it. Megan and Burns are arrested, and the painting is returned to the city. Mayor Quimby preserves it at the Springfield Arena Football Arena, built with the money from selling the public arts, where Homer and Lisa happily view the painting together.

== Production ==
This is the final episode written by Kevin Curran prior to his death in 2016. Curran pitched an idea for an episode based on municipalities that were selling public assets to settle debts. That idea was merged with another writer's affection for the 1970s television series Banacek to produce this episode. Executive producer Matt Selman stated that the episode is presented as if it was an episode of Manacek, a fictional detective television series that is a parody of Banacek.

Bill Hader was cast as Detective Manacek. He had previously guest-starred as another character in the twenty-fourth season episode "The Fabulous Faker Boy." Hader was able to find the character's voice based on his appearance and wardrobe. Selman stated that the character does not have jokes and that the humor comes from the voice and dialogue. Hader's former Saturday Night Live castmate Cecily Strong was cast as one of the suspects in the episode.

The episode was dedicated in memory of physicist Stephen Hawking. He appeared several times on the show starting with the tenth season episode "They Saved Lisa's Brain".

== Reception ==
=== Viewing figures ===
"Homer Is Where the Art Isn't" scored a 0.8 rating with a 3 share and was watched by 2.10 million people, making it Fox's second-highest-rated show of the night.

=== Critical response ===
Dennis Perkins of The A.V. Club gave this episode a B, stating, "At this point in its record-setting run, The Simpsons is entitled—encouraged, even—to muck about with its format all it wants. Here, the series' traditional linear sitcom storytelling style is upended, from the classic theme song right on through. Starting out with Homer, fancy duds and ping pong paddle at the ready, bidding millions of dollars for Joan Miró's abstract painting The Poetess, being outbid by first Mr. Burns and then 'billionaire tech mogul' Megan Matheson (Cecily Strong), and, enraged, being dragged out by security bellowing, 'Don't take that painting, I love it'—clearly, there's a mystery here. Both as to the hows and whys of Homer J. Simpson being involved in high-end art intrigue, and to what form this rejiggering of the Simpsons formula is taking. It's neat."

Tony Sokol of Den of Geek gave the episode 4 out of 5 stars. He stated that the episode was solid and that it worked because of the commitment to the source material. Retired Akron Beacon Journal writer Rich Heldenfels called the episode "a dead-on parody of Banacek."
