= Whistler's Father =

- The Simpsons episode
- Episode no.: Season 29; Episode 3
- Directed by: Matthew Faughnan
- Written by: Tom Gammill and Max Pross
- Production code: WABF16
- Original air date: October 15, 2017

Guest appearances
- Nick Fascitelli as Professor Whistler; Valerie Harper as Backstage Mom; Joe Mantegna as Fat Tony

Episode features
- Chalkboard gag: "It's unfair to judge a president on his first 300 days"
- Couch gag: The Simpson family is the furniture instead of the characters on the couch: Homer is the couch, Bart is the left lamp, Lisa is the right lamp, Maggie is the painting above the couch and Marge is the TV antenna. Couches come in to sit on Homer and painting-Maggie tilts herself once they're settled.

Episode chronology
← Previous "Springfield Splendor"	Next → "Treehouse of Horror XXVIII"
- The Simpsons season 29

"Whistler's Father" is the third episode of the twenty-ninth season of the American animated television series The Simpsons, and the 621st episode of the series overall. The episode was directed by Matthew Faughnan and written by Tom Gammill and Max Pross. It aired in the United States on Fox on October 15, 2017.

In this episode, Homer tries to gain fame with Maggie's whistling while Marge redecorates a building for Fat Tony. Nick Fascitelli and Valerie Harper guest starred. The episode received mixed reviews.

This is the final episode with a credit to longtime Simpsons score composer Alf Clausen, who was fired from his position shortly before the season began airing.

== Plot ==
Marge is out for the evening with Luann Van Houten, Bernice Hibbert and Helen Lovejoy, and asks Homer to take care of Maggie. The women, led by Helen, criticize Marge's taste in interior decorating. After thinking about her tastes, Marge resolves to decorate a late-pick-up room for Springfield Elementary like the set from The Wizard of Oz, but Lisa remembers there never was one. The Hibbert family changes their opinion on Marge's style, but Helen is not convinced yet while Fat Tony asks Marge to redecorate the Springfield Post Office. Marge buys decorations and tools for the job from the Get It and Regret It Hardware store, only to discover that Fat Tony turned the post office into a whorehouse.

Meanwhile, Homer discovers Maggie has a talent of being a whistling savant. He plans to use her talent to become famous with Grampa's encouragement, and they bring Maggie to the Springfield City Zoo to teach her new whistles, where Bart is disappointed he is the only son not to have talent.

The family, reunited to eat, is hiding secrets from each other, including Santa's Little Helper and Snowball II kissing each other. Homer brings Maggie to Channel 6, where the auditions for Hot Shot Tots are held. Upon learning how show business works, he tries to convince Maggie to stop. In front of the public, she is unable to whistle anymore due to a tooth growing in her mouth. When the women discover what happened to the post office, Marge convinces Fat Tony to close the whorehouse down.

Back at home, Homer says good night to Maggie, telling her to hide any other talent she has. When he is gone, she pulls out a beautiful black and white painting of Homer. In bed, Homer and Marge reveal the secrets they held from each other. Shortly after that, Homer is saddened to find out Marge is letting out his pants to make him think he is losing weight.

== Cultural references ==
Lisa mentions sharing the spotlight like on the television series South Park, but realizes Trey Parker does all the work.

== Reception ==
Dennis Perkins of The A.V. Club gave the episode a C stating, "There are weeks where evaluating a latter-day Simpsons is simply a numbers game. Absent an inherently interesting premise, guest star, plotline, or performance, watching an average Simpsons these days means totting up what fringe benefits you can find, subtracting things that either underwhelm or actively piss you off, and determining relative worth. ‘Whistler’s Father,’ being genuinely average across the board, seems to call for such a formulaic judgement."

Tony Sokol of Den of Geek gave the episode 3.5 out of 5 stars. He stated that the episode is filled with one-liners and sight gags but not a classic.

"Whistler's Father" scored a 1.3 rating with a 5 share and was watched by 2.91 million people, making it Fox's highest rated show of the night.
