= Grampy Can Ya Hear Me =

- The Simpsons episode
- Episode no.: Season 29; Episode 5
- Directed by: Bob Anderson
- Written by: Bill Odenkirk
- Production code: WABF19
- Original air date: November 5, 2017

Episode features
- Chalkboard gag: "Hooligan is not a profession". Later in the episode, Bart writes "I will not" five times using multiple chalks at once.
- Couch gag: A chronicle of the Simpson family from their immigration to America to the distant future.

Episode chronology
← Previous "Treehouse of Horror XXVIII"	Next → "The Old Blue Mayor She Ain't What She Used to Be"
- The Simpsons season 29

"Grampy Can Ya Hear Me" is the fifth episode of the twenty-ninth season of the American animated television series The Simpsons, and the 623rd episode of the series overall. The episode was directed by Bob Anderson and written by Bill Odenkirk. It aired in the United States on Fox on November 5, 2017.

In this episode, Grampa receives hearing aids but does not like what his family says about him while Principal Skinner learns his mother hid a college acceptance letter from him. The episode received mixed reviews.

== Plot ==
The Simpsons take Grampa to the Springfield Planetarium for his birthday. At the Planetarium show, the family watches a documentary on the Big Bang, but Grampa escapes after watching the explosion. Returning to the Springfield Retirement Castle, Grampa complains about the music being too low due to his hearing problem. At the home, his companions throw him a birthday party, asking him to make a wish. The Old Jewish Man gives him a hearing aid, a much appreciated gift as it gives him the hearing back.

At home, Grampa hears the dislike of the family for him being there, and says he is leaving the home forever and goes to Springfield Mall, where the shop attendants treat him like an old man, too. Soon, Grampa goes to the Veterans of Unpopular Wars bar, where he tells the bartender his problems. Homer receives a call from the bartender, who sends Grampa back home. Upon arriving at the Simpsons' house, Grampa hears the family missing him while reading the episode's script written by Lisa and Marge. Grampa realizes that his family finally cares about him, and the Simpsons join him in a big hug.

Meanwhile, Lisa asks Bart to help her break in to the school to change a homework paper she delivered with the wrong date for when the Big Bang happened. Bart and Lisa break into the school's basement, and change the date, but also discover that Principal Skinner is living in the storage. Skinner tells the story of how when he was young, he applied to Ohio State University to become part of the marching band; however his mother Agnes Skinner lied about him being accepted. Skinner goes to Ohio State University to tell them his story, but gets refused as it is too late. Skinner later confronts his mother for what she did, but his anger goes away when Agnes tearfully expresses remorse for her actions. He agrees to move back in with her on his conditions.

After Lisa has a nightmare of the future, becoming president, however being disqualified for cheating on the paper, she confesses to Miss Hoover her trick, but Miss Hoover already knows, and only wants her nicotine gum that Bart stole. It is revealed he gave it to the class pet who darts across the room with his wheel, energized by them and goes to torment Groundskeeper Willie.

== Production ==
The opening sequence was modified to show Maggie holding a bottle of Szechuan sauce while in the shopping cart. The change was a nod to the television series Rick and Morty. In the episode "The Rickshank Rickdemption," which aired earlier in the year, Rick mentioned his love for the sauce. The title characters previously appeared in the couch gag of the twenty-sixth season episode "Mathlete's Feat."

== Reception ==
Dennis Perkins of The A.V. Club gave the episode a B− stating, "So close, this one. ‘Grampy Can Ya Hear Me’ does a lot of little things well while frittering away the overall episode in about six different narrative directions. The script, credited to Bill Odenkirk, is packed with well-observed little character touches and clever side gags, while never settling on one storyline long enough to form the satisfying whole the episode is always on the verge of becoming. Unlike a run-of-the-mill B-minus episode of modern day Simpsons, ‘Grampy Can Ya Hear Me’ stings because of how, with a few adjustments, it could have been a genuinely solid one."

Tony Sokol of Den of Geek gave the episode 2.5 out of 5 stars. He stated that the episode ran out of air despite having three storylines and said the best part was the end tag.

"Grampy Can Ya Hear Me" scored a 1.3 rating with a 5 share and was watched by 2.86 million people, making it Fox's second highest rated show of the night.
