= No Good Read Goes Unpunished =

- The Simpsons episode
- Episode no.: Season 29; Episode 15
- Directed by: Mark Kirkland
- Written by: Jeff Westbrook
- Production code: XABF07
- Original air date: April 8, 2018

Guest appearances
- Daniel Radcliffe as himself; Jimmy O. Yang as Sun Tzu

Episode features
- Chalkboard gag: "April showers did not date the President"
- Couch gag: Someone (presumably Principal Skinner) does a connect the dots of the Simpson family, but Homer is drawn with three eyes and he says "D'oh!"

Episode chronology
← Previous "Fears of a Clown"	Next → "King Leer"
- The Simpsons season 29

"No Good Read Goes Unpunished" is the fifteenth episode of the twenty-ninth season of the American animated television series The Simpsons, and the 633rd episode of the series overall. The episode was directed by Mark Kirkland and written by Jeff Westbrook. It aired in the United States on Fox on April 8, 2018.

In this episode, Bart uses a book to manipulate Homer while Marge realizes her favorite childhood book is culturally insensitive. Daniel Radcliffe and Jimmy O. Yang guest starred. The episode received mixed reviews and drew criticism for attempting to address the character of Apu.

== Plot ==
The entire city of Springfield is ready to watch a nonstop marathon of every episode of The Itchy & Scratchy Show. After hours of watching the marathon, a frustrated Marge forces everyone in the family to give up their electronics for the day. After failed trips to the library and a modern book store, Marge takes the family to an old time book store. While at the book store, Bart tries to purchase tickets to a Tunnelcraft video game convention, but Homer refuses to allow Bart to purchase the tickets. This leads Bart to purchase The Art of War so that he can use the book to manipulate Homer into allowing him to go to the convention. At school, Bart tests the book's advice by stopping Nelson from beating him up for reading the book by irritating and distracting him. He takes his knowledge further by bribing Homer's friends to help him carry out his plan, which includes keeping Homer distracted and making him paranoid with items such as gongs and banners. After one incident where he nearly drowns in a lake of mud after eating a series of milk balls in a trap set by Bart, Homer relents and takes Bart and Milhouse to the video game convention.

At the convention, Homer runs into Daniel Radcliffe, and then blackmails Milhouse into revealing the reason behind Bart's manipulative behavior. He then reads the book to manipulate Bart by acting like and hanging out with Ned Flanders, including wearing a fake moustache to look like him. This climaxes with Homer, Bart and Ned going to see an old silent movie based on Silent Night. Bart pleads with his father to become normal again, which Homer agrees to on the condition that Bart provide him with the remainder of his Halloween candy. The two then reconcile after admitting they both read the book, and proceed to watch another silent movie in the theater with Ned.

Meanwhile, Marge purchases an old book called The Princess in the Garden that used to be her favorite while growing up. She hopes to read it to Lisa, but realizes it is actually culturally offensive in many different ways. In a dream sequence, Marge meets Rudyard Kipling, author of The Jungle Book, who tells her that it is okay to be racist. Also in the dream, she meets the author of The Princess in the Garden, Heloise Hodgeson Burwell, who gives her permission to rewrite the story to lessen the offensive stereotypes and clichés, but after Marge reads her edited version to Lisa, the two agree that it has lost meaning along with its "spirit and character". Lisa takes Marge to Springfield University, where she is told by modern scholars that the book is a subversive satire of conformity. However, Marge is not entirely convinced, and the scholars admit that they do not completely believe it either, but they are drinking heavily, and are therefore somewhat more inclined to ignore their feelings of scepticism.

== Production ==
Daniel Radcliffe guest starred as himself. He previously appeared as different characters in twenty-second season episode "Treehouse of Horror XXI" and the twenty-fifth season episode "Diggs." Jimmy O. Yang was cast as Sun Tzu.

== Cultural references ==
The silent movies Homer and Bart watch are similar to ones featuring Harold Lloyd.

== Reception ==
Although the episode received positive reception, Dennis Perkins of The A.V. Club gave this episode a D+, stating, "Irritating on several simultaneous levels, 'No Good Read Goes Unpunished' would be more bothersome if it were more memorable."

Tony Sokol of Den of Geek gave the episode 3.5 out of 5 stars. He stated that the episode handled the two stories well by spinning the racist book and having Homer skim The Art of War to outwit Bart.

"No Good Read Goes Unpunished" scored a 0.9 rating with a 4 share and was watched by 2.15 million people, making it Fox's highest rated show of the night.

== Allusion to The Problem with Apu ==
The episode alludes to the 2017 documentary The Problem with Apu written by and starring Hari Kondabolu, which addressed the issues surrounding racial stereotypes seen in Simpsons character Apu Nahasapeemapetilon. While a framed autographed photo of Apu sits in the foreground, Lisa says, "Something that started decades ago and was applauded and inoffensive is now politically incorrect. What can you do?" Marge replies, "Some things will be addressed at a later date." Lisa adds, "If at all."

Kondabolu was disappointed that the show reduced the film's "larger conversation about the representation of marginalized groups" into a specific complaint, vocalized by Lisa, that the character is "politically incorrect".

The allusion also drew criticism from several television critics. Jen Chaney of Vulture said the show was happy living in the past while not listening to others. Linda Holmes of NPR felt the message from the show was "we have hurt people, and we honestly don't care." Kelly Lawler of USA Today thought the allusion was "petty and remarkably regressive." Melanie McFarland of Salon.com called it an "example of a group of TV writers’ collective failure to acknowledge a significant flaw." Emily St. James of Vox said it was "a stupid way to respond to the controversy."

Later that week, Al Jean stated that he would attempt "to try to find an answer that is popular [and] more important right."
