= 3 Scenes Plus a Tag from a Marriage =

- The Simpsons episode
- Episode no.: Season 29; Episode 13
- Directed by: Matthew Nastuk
- Written by: Tom Gammill; Max Pross
- Production code: XABF06
- Original air date: March 25, 2018

Guest appearances
- John Baldessari as himself; Kevin Pollak as Ross, Bagel Man and Professor Thernstrom; J. K. Simmons as J.J. Gruff

Episode features
- Couch gag: An animated sequence by Bill Plympton based on his short film Your Face, sung by Homer and ending with the family on the couch.

Episode chronology
← Previous "Homer Is Where the Art Isn't"	Next → "Fears of a Clown"
- The Simpsons season 29

"3 Scenes Plus a Tag from a Marriage" is the thirteenth episode of the twenty-ninth season of the American animated television series The Simpsons, and the 631st episode of the series overall. The episode was directed by Matthew Nastuk and written by Tom Gammill and Max Pross. It aired in the United States on Fox on March 25, 2018. The title is a reference to the 1973 Swedish television miniseries Scenes from a Marriage.

In this episode, Homer and Marge tell the story of their early married life. Kevin Pollak and J. K. Simmons guest starred. Artist John Baldessari appeared as himself. The episode received mixed reviews.

== Plot ==
After watching a superhero movie and on Bart and Lisa's insistent request while staying after the credits for several middle and post-credit sequences, the Simpson family returns home from Capital City. Homer and Marge start narrating the story of how they lived there before getting married, and as soon as they observe their old apartment, the couple invite the kids to visit it.

They meet the new engaged owners of the accommodation, who give Marge their mail. They continue to tell their story to the owners, explaining how Marge was a photographer working for a news company led by J.J. Gruff while Homer worked at a new company called Flashmouth. They often went partying, watching movies and watching the starry sky on top of a car, but after Bart was born, their careers and lifestyles went downhill. Homer lost his job and Marge was threatened by J.J. Gruff to be replaced by Booberella if Marge didn't get a new nightlife story.

Marge interviewed John Baldessari for an article, but Homer and Bart entered the gallery after Bart drove the car on a ferry while Homer was sleeping, and he started making pranks. When Marge presented to J.J. Gruff the photos of it, she lost her job because the journal lost their art advertisers thanks to Bart.

After Bart got banned from kindergarten class, they brought their problems to the Church. The solution that Reverend Lovejoy proposed via showing them a video called "Problem Child," which suggests that the solution to rambunctious children was to have a second child. Thus, Lisa was born.

What they demonstrate to the couple is so terrible that the soon-to-be-wife leaves the house, but the family, forcing smiles to show they are happy, bring her back.

In the final scene, the family returns to Springfield, while Lisa starts asking more stories of their background. They stop at the Doughy Dozen Bagels to eat some bagels. Homer and Marge are alone, but are disturbed by the kids moving around in the car while Grampa watches them.

== Production ==
The couch gag is an adaptation of animator Bill Plympton's short film Your Face with Homer singing.

J.K. Simmons was cast as Marge's editor, and Kevin Pollak was cast to play several roles. Artist John Baldessari appeared as himself being interviewed by a young Marge.

== Reception ==
Dennis Perkins of The A.V. Club gave this episode a B−, stating, "'3 Scenes Plus A Tag From A Marriage' might only be one of a handful the pair are credited with writing, but they’ve been on board The Simpsons’ ship for a long, long time. That familiarity works to pepper this episode with more than a handful of decent gags that stand on their own, regardless of whatever quibbling is left to be done over the show's timeline at this point. But it also carries a whiff of self-referential self-amusement that makes the episode feel inessential. Watching two old pros punch a clock makes for some solid laughs, but it's still not the place for groundbreaking Simpsons comedy."

Tony Sokol of Den of Geek gave the episode 3.5 out of 5 stars. He called the episode subversive but not covering anything new.

"3 Scenes Plus a Tag from a Marriage" scored a 0.9 rating with a 4 share and was watched by 2.15 million people, making it Fox's highest rated show of the night.
