= Gone Boy =

- The Simpsons episode
- Episode no.: Season 29; Episode 9
- Directed by: Rob Oliver
- Written by: John Frink
- Production code: XABF02
- Original air date: December 10, 2017

Guest appearances
- Kelsey Grammer as Sideshow Bob; Valerie Harper as Nurse; John F. Kennedy as himself (archive footage); Shaquille O'Neal as himself

Episode features
- Chalkboard gag: "Snow angels are not frozen hobos"
- Couch gag: A Santa's workshop-themed version of the standard opening sequence. In the end, the family pops into popcorn sitting on a hot couch, and are threaded onto a garland that is hung around the Christmas tree.

Episode chronology
← Previous "Mr. Lisa's Opus"	Next → "Haw-Haw Land"
- The Simpsons season 29

"Gone Boy" is the ninth episode of the twenty-ninth season of the American animated television series The Simpsons, and the 627th episode of the series overall. The episode was directed by Rob Oliver and written by John Frink. It aired in the United States on Fox on December 10, 2017. The title is a spoof of the novel Gone Girl.

In this episode, the town searches for Bart when he goes missing, but after he is declared dead, Sideshow Bob refuses to believe it. Kelsey Grammer and Valerie Harper guest starred. Former basketball player Shaquille O'Neal appeared as himself. The episode received mixed reviews.

== Plot ==
Sideshow Bob is collecting trash for community service with other men. However, when they finish the work, the Simpson family runs it over with a rental car. After finishing up the rental time and fuel, Homer goes with Bart to play. However, Bart needs to pee and goes in the forest, falling down a manhole. Bart finds himself in a strange bunker, where he finds electronic equipment, which appears to be a military installation. Bart tries to escape, but the ladder gives in. Milhouse finds the entrance but fails to help him.

The family and the Springfield Police Department as well as Bob and the other detainees start searching the forest for Bart, but Chief Wiggum and his fellow police officers are unable to find him. The news states Bart is dead, but Milhouse decides to hide the fact that Bart is okay to garner Lisa's affection, and Bob struggles to accept he is dead. When Bart finds a phone in the bunker, he calls Marge to assure her he is alive.

When Milhouse leaves the house after getting more hugs from Lisa, Bob forces him to bring him to Bart with the family right behind. Bob shoves Milhouse down the manhole and then follows him immediately. Homer and Grampa are unable to find them once again while Bob ties them up to a Titan II missile and tries to launch it and kill them both. He soon has a change of heart and saves them at the advice of the injured prison therapist, as the missile crashes. Back in prison, Bob begins his prison therapy, vowing to do good when his life sentences are done.

Many years later, Bob is shown to have retired to a secluded lighthouse as a mailman delivers his mail.

== Production ==
In May 2017, Entertainment Weekly reported that basketball player Shaquille O'Neal would guest star as himself when Homer asks him for help. O'Neal was previously featured in the twenty-second season episode "Love Is a Many Strangled Thing" in a non-speaking appearance. Kelsey Grammer guest starred for the 21st time as Sideshow Bob.

== Cultural references ==
The episode title is a parody of the novel Gone Girl. Sideshow Bob sings a musical number from Gilbert and Sullivan's The Yeomen of the Guard. He later argues about the difference between the magazines The New Yorker and New York. Certain repeated animated sequence are in the style of the Film “Anatomy of a Murder” which starred James Stewart. The music from the movie “Cape Fear” is also featured at least on a couple of occasions such as the scene in the prison.

== Reception ==
=== Viewing figures ===
"Gone Boy" scored a 2.3 rating with an 8 share and was watched by 6.06 million people, making it Fox's highest rated show of the night.

=== Critical response ===
Dennis Perkins of The A.V. Club gave this episode a B+, stating, "A coherent narrative throughline—check. Carefully nurtured extended gags—check. Lines that actually made me laugh out loud—a handful of checks. Couple all that with a refreshing lack of atonal jokes that either violate the show’s spirit or pander glibly to pop cultural ephemera, and even a halfway decent repurposed Christmas couch gag, and I found that, by the end of ‘Gone Boy,’ I'd had a uniformly good time watching The Simpsons."

Tony Sokol of Den of Geek gave the episode 3/5 stars, saying, "The premise promised...by the title of The Simpsons season 29, episode 9, ‘Gone Boy,’ would have made for a far more original offering from the series. The book and film Gone Girl was about a missing wife, who lived such a duplicitous double life, no one wanted to believe the most obvious suspect, her husband, was indeed the killer, had only she died. Bart Simpson lives a duplicitous life and everyone would believe his mortal nemesis would have had no choice but to kill the boy. Sideshow Bob was indeed spotted near the crime scene, associating with known rakes, of the boy, Bart Simpson, he vowed to kill. Bart, of course, is a master prankster and we wouldn't have had that much sympathy for him until he turned up again."

=== Awards and nominations ===
This episode was nominated for the Primetime Emmy Award for Outstanding Animated Program at the 70th Primetime Creative Arts Emmy Awards.

== Notes ==
1. In some versions of this couch gag, the family is in their Christmas attire (elf costumes), but in others, they're just in their regular outfits.
