= Springfield Splendor =

- The Simpsons episode
- Episode no.: Season 29; Episode 2
- Directed by: Matthew Faughnan
- Written by: Tim Long; Miranda Thompson
- Production code: WABF22
- Original air date: October 8, 2017

Guest appearances
- Alison Bechdel as herself; Rachel Bloom as Annette; Roz Chast as herself; Dan Harmon as himself; Kipp Lennon sings "Collaboration"; Marjane Satrapi as herself; Martin Short as Guthrie Frenel

Episode chronology
← Previous "The Serfsons"	Next → "Whistler's Father"
- The Simpsons season 29

"Springfield Splendor" is the second episode of the twenty-ninth season of the American animated television series The Simpsons, and the 620th episode of the series overall. The episode was directed by Matthew Faughnan and written by Tim Long and Miranda Thompson. It aired in the United States on Fox on October 8, 2017.

In this episode, Marge makes drawings of Lisa's feelings, and they accidentally become a graphic novel which is credited to Lisa. Rachel Bloom and Martin Short guest starred. Cartoonists Alison Bechdel, Roz Chast, Marjane Satrapi, and writer Dan Harmon appeared as themselves. The episode received positive reviews. Animator Caroline Cruikshank won a Primetime Emmy Award for Outstanding Individual Achievement in Animation for character animation for this episode.

This episode is dedicated in memory of Tom Petty, who had a guest appearance in the fourteenth season episode "How I Spent My Strummer Vacation."

== Plot ==
After Lisa has a recurring dream involving the lockers at Springfield Elementary, Homer and Marge decide to seek a therapist. Due to Homer having used all their insurance-covered counseling sessions for a stupid reason, they take her to see a shrink-in-training at Springfield Community College.

There, a therapist student suggests that Lisa draw her typical day. Back home, Lisa is frustrated at her bad drawings, so Marge helps her drawing while she explains her feelings. Lisa takes the drawings to the college, but they fall out of her backpack on the steps that lead into the building. Comic Book Guy's unhappy wife Kumiko collects them and sells them at The Android's Dungeon and Baseball Card Shop as a graphic novel called Sad Girl. Lisa and Marge complain to Comic Book Guy and Kumiko; however, when they see that people are buying (and relating to) the books, Lisa is happy and stops Kumiko from burning them. Marge and Lisa get commissioned by Kumiko to do a sequel, and they bond.

At the Bi-Mon-Sci-Fi-Con, a panel is held by Roz Chast, with Alison Bechdel and Marjane Satrapi, but the public lauds Lisa and hurts Marge's feelings by not wanting to listen to her talk about her drawing work. When Marge tells Lisa she wants more credit, Lisa becomes defensive and they have an argument, which ends with them dissolving their partnership. Soon thereafter, they meet a theatrical director, Guthrie Frenel, who has come by the house and wants to make an avant-garde Broadway show of the books. When the play opens, it is revealed to focus on Marge's work and makes a point of giving Lisa/Sad Girl little mention. Lisa is upset and talks to the therapist about it, getting an analogy on parenting that's inspired by the therapist having just had a baby after an affair with her faculty advisor.

At the premiere of Frenel's play, Marge finally notices that the play is terrible and also insulting to Lisa. She draws Lisa's face on a spotlight and shines it on the stage, enraging Frenel, which causes a chain reaction that ruins the show.

During the end credits, Marge presents Maggie her comic "The Adventures of Sad Girl's Mom". Marge still thinks it's good, but Maggie is disappointed with it.

== Production ==
The episode was scheduled to be the season 29 premiere. However, "The Serfsons" took its place and the episode aired the week after. On October 12, Matt Selman tweeted a video of a cut opening scene from the episode. The scene sees a dream in Homer's head where he's on a show called "Dream Date". He has three women to choose from; the friendly stewardess who winked at him 23 years ago, She-Hulk or the sexy ketchup bottle from the commercial he likes. Homer chooses the ketchup bottle, but then She-Hulk smashes her apart. Homer and She-Hulk then go out on a date, using the broken bottle of ketchup to dip food in.

This is the first episode credited to co-writer Miranda Thompson, wife of co-writer Tim Long. Martin Short was cast as an eccentric theater director who turns a graphic novel written by Lisa and drawn by Marge into a musical. Rachel Bloom was cast as a student psychologist. Writer Dan Harmon appeared as himself. Cartoonists Alison Bechdel, Roz Chast, and Marjane Satrapi appeared as themselves. Bechdel recorded her lines on the Fox lot and was directed by Long. Thompson and Long also showed her the writers room.

== Cultural references ==
The episode title is a reference to the comic book series American Splendor. Lisa's graphic novel Sad Girl is a reference to Bechdel's book Fun Home. The disaster at the opening of Frenel's play refers to the issues of the play Spider-Man: Turn Off the Dark. Dan Harmon's story circle in the community college class is a reference to his community college based sitcom, Community, his firing and rehiring, and the show moving to Yahoo Screen, as well as his script writing method.

== Reception ==
=== Viewing figures ===
"Springfield Splendor" scored a 2.2 rating with an 8 share, and was watched by 5.25 million people, making it Fox's highest-rated show of the night.

=== Critical response ===
Dennis Perkins of The A.V. Club gave the episode a B+ stating, "'Springfield Splendor'’s journey has a lot along the way to perk up the eyes and ears of the jaded Simpsons viewer. The plot, about Lisa and Marge teaming up to tell Lisa’s American Splendor-esque miserablist life story in graphic novel form, allows for an arresting visual style in those scenes where Marge’s pencils are animated to illustrate their comic vision. Accompanied as the stylized images are by a melancholy jazz score (as any real Lisa narrative would be), these sequences have a life of their own that suggests how well the mother-daughter team has captured what’s going on in Lisa’s head every damned day in the yahoo-infested halls of Springfield Elementary. The sequences’ lovely and evocative mix of the internal and external are impressive without being flashy, less a gimmick than an expansion of the show’s capabilities. They’re super."

Tony Sokol of Den of Geek gave the episode 3.5 out of 5 stars. He called the episode a solid entry and highlighted the movements of Guthrie Frenel.

Michael Cavna of The Washington Post called the episode a perfect bookend to the thirteenth season episode "I Am Furious (Yellow)." He also said the episode reflects how comic readership has changed since the nineteenth season episode "Husbands and Knives," which also showcased three comic book artists.

=== Awards and nominations ===
Animator Caroline Cruikshank won a Primetime Emmy Award for Outstanding Individual Achievement in Animation for character animation at the 70th Primetime Creative Arts Emmy Awards for the episode.
