= Fears of a Clown =

- The Simpsons episode
- Episode no.: Season 29; Episode 14
- Directed by: Steven Dean Moore
- Written by: Michael Price
- Production code: XABF08
- Original air date: April 1, 2018

Guest appearances
- Andy Daly as Judge Dowd; Damian Kulash as himself; Jon Lovitz as Llewellyn Sinclair; Jackie Mason as Rabbi Hyman Krustofsky; Tim Nordwind as himself

Episode features
- Chalkboard gag: The blackboard reads "This is the last episode", but Bart flips it over to reveal the words "April Fool".
- Couch gag: The family runs into a museum of television and sits down at their couch marked with a record-setting 636 episodes. However, Lisa informs the family they are 4 episodes early, in which Homer says "D'oh!"

Episode chronology
| ← Previous "3 Scenes Plus a Tag from a Marriage" | Next → "No Good Read Goes Unpunished" |
- The Simpsons season 29

"Fears of a Clown" is the fourteenth episode of the twenty-ninth season of the American animated television series The Simpsons, and the 632nd episode of the series overall. The episode was directed by Steven Dean Moore and written by Michael Price. It aired in the United States on Fox on April 1, 2018.

In this episode, Bart glues clown masks to the teachers' faces, ruining Krusty's career, so he is sent to be rehabilitated. Andy Daly, Jon Lovitz, and Jackie Mason guest starred. Musicians Damian Kulash and Tim Nordwind appeared as themselves. The episode received mixed reviews.

== Plot ==
Principal Skinner tells Groundskeeper Willie that he plans to retire, with Martin discovering the secret and telling the entire school. During the final sendoff, Skinner chooses Bart for his final farewell, who attempts to shoot him in the head with a rock. However, it is revealed that the retirement was just a ruse so Skinner would finally blow the whistle on Bart after years of being pranked by him. Feeling embarrassed and angry, Bart chooses to pull off the ultimate prank to the entire staff by super-gluing the faces of Skinner and staff with plastic Krusty the Clown masks. Unfortunately, this causes people around Springfield to become terrified of clowns, and also causes Krusty to lose his comedic edge.

Lisa then convinces Krusty to turn into a serious actor, and he takes part in a parody play version of Death of a Salesman, called The Salesman's Bad Day, written by Llewellyn Sinclair (his second major appearance since "A Streetcar Named Marge"), which Krusty at first cannot do, until Sinclair motivates him, causing Krusty to become a serious actor until his clown self appears in his mind, telling him that he is still a clown and nothing else.

Meanwhile, Bart is in court and is about to be free with the "boys will be boys" saying, until Marge objects and tells Judge Dowd that what Bart did was terrible and he has a real problem with pranking and suggests that Dowd punish Bart, resulting in him going to a rehab center for almost a month. Although Marge thinks she did a good thing, she begins to question her actions. During a session as Bart places tacks on the doctor's chair, the doctor convinces Marge to come in and sit on his chair, causing Bart to stop the prank and completing one step of his treatment.

After being released, Bart goes to apologize to the people whom he pranked. However, with the encouragement of Willie, Bart plans to pull the ultimate prank, staging a fake apology announcement at the gymnasium where above the crowd is a net full of water balloons. But when he sees Marge in the crowd, he tries to tell people to run away but the weight of the water balloons breaks the net, causing the crowd to get drenched, with Marge finally realizing that the "boys will be boys" saying is real and that motherhood "sucks", followed by Homer saying the same saying and Marge walking into the boys restroom to get even with him.

On the night of the play, Krusty is still being haunted by his former clown self. During the play, as Krusty tries to quiet the voice inside his mind, he causes the audience to laugh. He realizes that he is not a serious actor, but a clown, and starts to do comedic antics.

In the final scene, the play that Krusty was in is later seen being witnessed by the ghosts of Krusty, Arthur Miller, Rabbi Hyman Krustofsky, and William Shakespeare.

== Production ==
Jon Lovitz reprised his role as Llewellyn Sinclair, the director of Krusty's play.

== Reception ==
=== Viewing figures ===
"Fears of a Clown" scored a 0.9 rating with a 4 share and was watched by 2.06 million people, making it Fox's highest rated show of the night.

=== Critical response ===
Dennis Perkins of The A.V. Club gave this episode a C−, stating, "Sometimes The Simpsons rolls out an episode that’s so pale an approximation of its best that sticking up for it becomes an exercise in hand-waving and deep, deep sighs. 'Fears Of A Clown' isn’t good. It’s also not bad. It is, instead, irrelevant in its hollow echoes of past, actually memorable, episodes. When the book on 'The Simpsons' is finally closed...and the inevitable all-time episode rankings are compiled, 'Fears Of A Clown' is one of those installments destined to elicit blank stares, even from die-hard fans. It barely exists."

Tony Sokol of Den of Geek gave the episode 4 out of 5 stars. He stated that the episode had a subversive happy ending since Krusty and Bart overcame the need to be better.

=== Awards and nominations ===
Actor Dan Castellaneta was nominated for the Primetime Emmy Award for Outstanding Character Voice-Over Performance at the 70th Primetime Creative Arts Emmy Awards for voicing Homer Simpson, Krusty the Clown, Groundskeeper Willie, and Sideshow Mel in this episode.
