= Treehouse of Horror XXVIII =

- The Simpsons episode
- Episode no.: Season 29; Episode 4
- Directed by: Timothy Bailey
- Written by: John Frink
- Production code: WABF18
- Original air date: October 22, 2017

Guest appearances
- Mario Batali as himself; Ben Daniels as a priest; William Friedkin as Dr. Kenneth Humphries; Neil Gaiman as Snowball

Episode chronology
← Previous "Whistler's Father"	Next → "Grampy Can Ya Hear Me"
- The Simpsons season 29

"Treehouse of Horror XXVIII" is the fourth episode of the twenty-ninth season of the American animated television series The Simpsons, the 28th episode in the Treehouse of Horror series of Halloween specials, and the 622nd episode of the series overall. The episode was directed by Timothy Bailey and written by John Frink. It aired in the United States on Fox on October 22, 2017.

In this episode, Maggie is possessed by a demon, Lisa finds an alternate reality where people have buttons for eyes, and Homer starts eating himself. Ben Daniels, William Friedkin, and Neil Gaiman guest starred. Chef Mario Batali appeared as himself. The episode received mixed reviews.

== Plot ==
=== Opening Sequence: The Sweets Hereafter ===
The Simpson family is in a bowl with other treats left for trick-or-treaters in front of a house on Halloween. When the Barterfinger bar fears being taken, the Marge bar comforts him by saying he is always the last taken, and the Oh Homer! bar adds that even a box of stale raisins gets taken before him. Nelson's Crunch and Kirkish Taffy are taken, and Apple Lisa complains about no one ever wanting the apples, as people are afraid of razor blades being inside them. The Marge bar tries to reassure her by saying apples are taken when dipped in caramel, to Apple Lisa's disgust. Shauna takes the Senior Mints, after the Oh Homer! bar moves aside to evade her grasp, and eats its contents.

The next day, the Simpsons are the only ones left, and they are placed on a shelf. Already on the shelf is a chocolate Easter Bunny that tells them they will be left there, forgotten. Seeing his discomfort as no one ever takes him, the Oh Homer! bar starts eating him. The Marge bar tries to stop him, but he tells her chocolate does not feel anything, and resumes eating it, with the rest of the family joining in when he eats the bunny's mouth to silence his objections. The camera pans to the wall, where "The Simpsons Easter Special" is written, but the chocolate from the bunny splatters all over it, covering the words, and dark chocolate resembling blood spells out the episode's title.

The animated segment was loosely inspired by Sausage Party.

=== The Exor-Sis ===
On a pre-Christian temple site in northern Iraq (a parody of the opening scene of The Exorcist), a Pazuzu statue is dug up and sent through Amazon to the Simpsons home due to Homer accidentally ordering it, thinking it said "pizza". After Homer sings a very disturbing lullaby, he leaves the statue by Maggie's bed. The demon within it possesses Maggie, and makes its presence known during the cocktail party that Homer and Marge are hosting downstairs. The demon kills a complaining Helen Lovejoy before locking everyone in and then killing Dr. Hibbert while revealing that he is cheating on his wife. Ned Flanders tells the Simpsons that Maggie needs an exorcism before being killed. An Irish priest arrives and performs the exorcism that purges the demon from Maggie, but the demon ends up possessing Bart. The demon fearfully regrets this, declaring that Bart has the most evil soul he has ever seen, calling it worse than working for David Schwimmer.

=== Coralisa ===
In a parody of Coraline, Maggie is recovering from Pazuzu when she violently vomits all over the dinner table, eventually flooding the kitchen. In Lisa's room, Snowball V (voiced by Neil Gaiman) takes her through a secret tunnel that brings her to another version of the family that have buttons in place of their eyes. While the alternate family seem perfect, Lisa runs back to the real world in terror when she learns they want to sew buttons over her eyes so she can remain with them forever. Lisa reconsiders the alternate family's offer after Homer kills a snake with her saxophone.

A few days later, the family realize Lisa is missing. Homer accepts this, saying Maggie gets Lisa's room and clothes, while Bart gets her homework. Upon hearing this, Bart escapes through the door and is accepted in the alternate reality. After Marge follows after her children, Homer follows suit and a meeting with the alternate family results with him inadvertently decapitating the alternate Bart while the alternate Homer injures himself on a pair of scissors trying to avenge the former. This infuriates the alternate Marge as she transforms into a spider-like monster to attack Homer, who decides to take advantage of the situation to benefit himself: bringing the surviving members of the alternate family back to the real world with his alternate counterpart attending parent-teacher meetings while the alternate Marge becomes their house's caretaker. Lisa accepts this outcome, claiming that it could have been much worse.

=== MMM… Homer ===
Lisa warns viewers about this segment's disgusting content, proclaiming that they may want to watch Game of Thrones afterwards to calm down. The segment, a parody of "Survivor Type", begins with Homer remaining home while the rest of the family go on vacation with Patty and Selma. Homer eats all his food supplies, ending up with only vegetables before finding a frozen hot dog. While trying to grill the frozen hot dog, he loses it to Santa's Little Helper, then accidentally cuts off his own finger. He cooks the finger and eats it. He discovers how tasty it is and starts cooking parts of his body before his family returns. They become suspicious as Homer constantly wears oven mitts to hide his severed fingers, is now 20 pounds lighter, and walks with a limp.

One night Marge discovers Homer's self-cannibalism when she walks in on him frying his own severed leg. She takes him to an addiction counselor for help, but Mario Batali, in search for new ingredients, convinces a despondent (and now missing the entire lower half of his body) Homer to cook his remaining body parts to be sold at Chez Homer and several other restaurants across Springfield. Carl mentions that they are also eating Barney Gumble, Comic Book Guy, and horse meat. In Heaven, Homer comments to Jesus how he now shares people eating his body with him, as the Springfield residents have turned into cannibals.

== Production ==
=== Development ===
With the first two segments parodying the films The Exorcist and Coraline, executive producer Al Jean wanted something scary and original for the final act. Producer Joel H. Cohen had pitched the idea of Homer eating Homer. Although the story is similar to Stephen King's short story "Survivor Type", Jean said it was not on their minds. Jean was worried the story would be too extreme but received approval from executive producer James L. Brooks and actor Dan Castellaneta. He also received no notes from Fox. The producers wanted Lisa to sing Leonard Cohen's song "Hallelujah" at the end of the segment but were unable to secure the rights. Instead, they created a parody of Handel's Hallelujah.

=== Casting ===
Ben Daniels appeared as a priest in the first segment, and starred on the Fox television series The Exorcist. He received an email from the casting director inviting him to voice someone in the Exorcist parody. The character had already been drawn, so he needed to lip-sync to the animation.

Author Neil Gaiman, who wrote the novel Coraline, was cast as the voice of Snowball in the second segment. Gaiman previously appeared the twenty-third season episode "The Book Job" as a different character.

Director William Friedkin, who directed the 1973 film The Exorcist, was cast as Dr. Kenneth Humphries in the third segment. Chef Mario Batali appeared as himself. Batali previously appeared in the twenty-third season episode "The Food Wife."

== Reception ==
=== Critical response ===
This episode received mostly mixed reviews. Dennis Perkins of The A.V. Club gave the episode a B− stating, "The 28th 'Treehouse Of Horror' carries on the venerable Simpsons institution by, as ever, tossing a whole lot of stuff at the screen and seeing what sticks. To that end, this year’s outing gives us: An 'Exorcist' parody, a 'Coraline' parody, Homer eating human flesh (just his own, but still), stop-motion segments, horror and fantasy-specific guest stars, a little light Fox standards-pushing (Homer does, as stated, eat human flesh), and the usual string of hit-or-miss gags. That last part isn’t really a criticism in itself. Freed up from the need to calibrate the heart-yucks equation, a 'Treehouse Of Horror' rises or falls on the strength of its jokes, although the annual Halloween anthology provides its own unique degree of difficulty."

Jesse Schedeen of IGN gave the episode an 8.6 out of 10 stating, "The 'Treehouse of Horror' specials are rarely among the more memorable episodes in any given season of The Simpsons. However, Season 29 is likely to be a major exception. All three segments in this year's special were strong. The series finally plugged two major holes in its huge collection of horror movie parodies while also reminding us that it can offend and disturb with the best of them. Perhaps there's still more mileage to be found in this long-running Simpsons trope."

Tony Sokol of Den of Geek gave the episode four out of five stars stating, "'Treehouse of Horror XXVIII' had chills and spills, which Marge, of course, has to clean, but the thrills were only middling. It was a very funny episode, yes. It took chances, like leaving a kid alone with a catholic [sic] priest, but ultimately doesn't reach the dizzying highs, terrifying lows nor the creamy middles of Halloweens past. It's better than a Butterfinger, but doesn't have a long-enough lasting aftertaste."

=== Viewing figures ===
"Treehouse of Horror XXVIII" scored a 1.6 rating with a 6 share and was watched by 3.66 million people, making it Fox's highest rated show of the night.

=== Awards and nominations ===
Director Timothy Bailey was nominated for the Annie Award for Outstanding Achievement for Directing in an Animated Television/Broadcast Production at the 45th Annie Awards for this episode.
