= Alf Clausen =

American film and television composer (1941–2025)

Background information
- Born: Alf Faye Heiberg Clausen; March 28, 1941; Minneapolis, Minnesota, U.S.
- Died: May 29, 2025 (aged 84) Los Angeles, California, U.S.
- Genres: Film and television scores
- Occupations: Composer; songwriter; producer
- Instruments: French horn; piano; bass
- Years active: 1967–2017
- Website: www.alfclausen.com

Alf Faye Heiberg Clausen (March 28, 1941 – May 29, 2025) was an American film and television composer. He is best known for his work scoring many episodes of The Simpsons, for which he was the sole composer between 1990 and 2017. Clausen scored or orchestrated music for more than 30 films and television shows, including Moonlighting, The Naked Gun, ALF and Ferris Bueller's Day Off. Clausen received an Honorary Doctorate of Music from Berklee College of Music in 1996.

== Early life, family and education ==
Clausen was born in Minneapolis, Minnesota, on March 28, 1941. He was raised in Jamestown, North Dakota. Clausen was interested in music from a young age. He counted composer Henry Mancini as one of his heroes; his book Sounds and Scores inspired him. He began playing the French horn in the seventh grade and also learned piano; and he sang in his high school choir. He continued playing and learned to play the bass guitar, stopping singing because the choir met at the same time as the band.

He studied mechanical engineering at North Dakota State University although, after being inspired by his pianist cousin, switched his major to music theory. While there, Clausen took a correspondence course at Boston's Berklee School of Music in jazz and big band writing. He went on to attend the University of Wisconsin–Madison to complete his master's degree, but he quit, as he disliked the place, especially what he felt was an "anti-jazz" attitude. He later attended Berklee and graduated with a diploma in arranging and composition in 1966. Clausen was the first French horn player to ever attend the college and took part in many ensembles; he is also featured on some Jazz in the Classroom albums.

== Career ==
After college, Clausen worked for a period as a musician. After earning his master's degree at Berklee, Clausen taught there for a year.

Clausen moved to Los Angeles, California, in 1967 in search of television work, wanting to become a full-time composer. For nine years he did some arrangement work for singers, ghostwriting and other composing jobs, such as commercial jingles, as well as working as a teacher, music copyist and a bassist. He worked as a copyist on "Come On Get Happy", the theme song to The Partridge Family. He eventually became a score writer and later the music director and conductor for Donny & Marie between 1976 and 1979. Initially, he was requested to write an emergency chart for the following day, but he was hired as a score writer and continued writing and conducting on the show, before replacing Tommy Oliver as music director. When the show moved to Utah, Clausen flew there each week from Los Angeles to record the score. He had the same role on The Mary Tyler Moore Hour in 1979. In 1981 he was nominated for the Primetime Emmy Award for Outstanding Achievement In Music Direction for Omnibus.

Clausen served as the composer for the series Moonlighting from 1985 to 1989, scoring 63 of the 65 episodes. His favorite episode to score was the episode "The Dream Sequence Always Rings Twice", which featured two lengthy black and white dream sequences; and he enjoyed the episode "Atomic Shakespeare", also a fantasy episode. He received an Emmy nomination for each episode in the category Outstanding Achievement In Music Composition For A Series (Dramatic Underscore) in 1986 and 1987, earning two more nominations over the next two years for the episodes "Here's Living with You, Kid" and "A Womb with a View". In 1988 and 1989 he also received nominations for the Emmy for Outstanding Achievement In Music Direction. He was also the composer on ALF from 1986 to 1990.

His other television compositions included Wizards and Warriors (1983), Fame (1984), Lime Street (1985), Christine Cromwell (1989), and My Life and Times (1991) as well as the television films Murder in Three Acts (1986), Double Agent (1987), Police Story: The Watch Commander (1988), My First Love (1988), She Knows Too Much (1989), and the feature film Number One with a Bullet (1987). He also conducted the orchestras and, for some, provided additional music for several films including The Beastmaster (1982), Airplane II: The Sequel (1982), Splash (1984), Weird Science (1985), Ferris Bueller's Day Off (1986), Dragnet (1987), and The Naked Gun (1988).

=== The Simpsons and other work ===
The show provides him the opportunity to score realistic drama, overblown comedy, gritty urban jazz, Broadway-worthy show tunes, and some of the most clever and loving parodies of cheap-o television news themes, '70s action music, and feature film scores ever done. Alf delivers in spades, always bringing his trademark stylistic verve and technical precision. He has proved beyond a doubt that television scoring is not the vast wasteland it is often purported to be and that an intelligent composer can take even the most demanding shows and elevate them to new heights.
— Doug Adams of Film Score Monthly about Clausen's work on The Simpsons

Following ALF's conclusion, Clausen was unemployed for seven months. Clausen's friend suggested him to a producer from the Fox animated series The Simpsons, who were looking for a new composer. Clausen "had no interest in doing animation" and "wanted to be a drama composer." However, the show's creator Matt Groening told him "we don't look upon this as being a cartoon, but a drama where the characters are drawn, and we would like it scored that way." Clausen took the job. Groening told Clausen that the "emotion [should be] scored first and the action scored second", unlike many other cartoons, and that "scoring the emotions of the characters" was the primary aim for The Simpsons. Clausen's first episode was "Treehouse of Horror", the third episode of season two, in 1990. It served as an audition and he was hired permanently after that. Thereafter, he scored almost all of the music and songs that appeared on the show, across a wide range of musical styles through the end of the 28th season.

He conducted a 35-piece orchestra for the music, a rarity for television shows, and recorded the score for an episode every week. Clausen wrote an episode's score during the week, recorded it on a Friday, with some variation if vocals are required. The limited timeframe proved the most challenging aspect of the job for Clausen; he was once required to write 57 musical cues in one week. For the show's original songs production is much longer; Clausen recorded the music to the writers' lyrics, over seven or eight months the scene is animated, and then Clausen could re-record the song with a full orchestra. The full orchestra allows easy transition between the wide range of musical styles required for the show. Clausen noted:

The greatest composing challenge has been to try to make some kind of musical sense out of the cues when I have only a few seconds to make a musical statement. We have a joke on the scoring stage that I can make you feel five ways in thirteen seconds. We say it in jest, but the reality of the situation is that I am required to do just that quite often.

Clausen intentionally opted against composing themes for each character, with some exceptions such as Mr. Burns, and instead "[gives] each story its own theme and thematic development...That approach helps to give each story its own special identification, more like individual mini-movies." He supplemented the orchestra with additional instruments, such as extra brass for the episode "Cape Feare", for which Clausen composed Sideshow Bob's theme, which continues to be played whenever Bob gets out of prison in subsequent episodes. It is based on the score of the movie Cape Fear, composed by Bernard Herrmann. The musical requests of the writers range from rerecording a specific piece of music to composing something based on a character's emotion in a scene.

Clausen received two Primetime Emmy Awards for his work on The Simpsons, winning the award for Outstanding Individual Achievement in Music and Lyrics two years in a row. The first was for "We Put The Spring In Springfield" from the 1996 episode "Bart After Dark", the second was for "You're Checkin' In" from the 1997 episode "The City of New York vs. Homer Simpson"; the lyrics of each song were written by Ken Keeler. He was nominated in the category a further seven times in 1994, 1995, 1996, 2002, 2003, 2004, and 2005. Clausen also received twelve nominations for Outstanding Individual Achievement in Music Composition for a Series (Dramatic Underscore) between 1992 and 2011 and was twice been nominated for Outstanding Music Direction, in 1997 and 1998. With 30 nominations, Clausen received more Emmy nominations to date than any other musician.

He won five Annie Awards for his work on The Simpsons. He won the 1997 award for Best Music in a TV Production, the award for Outstanding Music in an Animated Television Production in 1998, again for "You're Checkin' In", the same award in 2000 for the episode "Behind the Laughter", the award for Best Music in an Animated Television Production in 2003 for "Dude, Where's My Ranch?", and again in 2007 for "Yokel Chords".

His work on the show has been released as part of three albums produced by Clausen: Songs in the Key of Springfield (1997), Go Simpsonic with The Simpsons (1999), and The Simpsons: Testify (2007). Clausen was not asked to score the film adaptation of the show, with Hans Zimmer getting the job. He noted, "... sometimes you're the windshield, sometimes you're the bug".

Whilst working on The Simpsons, Clausen scored The Critic from 1994 to 1995 and Bette in 2000. He also scored the 1998 film Half Baked. He recorded the album Swing Can Really Hang You Up The Most in 2003, comprising the arrangements he made over his career, performed by his jazz orchestra, after self-financing it.

In 2011, Clausen was awarded the American Society of Composers, Authors and Publishers Golden Note Award. ASCAP President Paul Williams said his "decades of scores for The Simpsons and other TV programs and films are as endlessly inventive as the imaginations of the shows' writers and animators. It takes a lot of serious work and thought to compose, arrange and conduct such wonderfully happy music."

On August 30, 2017, after 27 years of scoring for The Simpsons, it was revealed that Clausen was dismissed from the show, with suggestions that the reasons behind the decision were largely financial. His last complete score was for "Dogtown". However, following the news of Clausen's departure, the producers of the show stated that he would "continue to have an ongoing role in the show." Beginning with Season 29, scoring was taken over by Bleeding Fingers Music, with Clausen credited as "Composer Emeritus." His last credit is for composing the music for the episode "Whistler's Father".

On August 5, 2019, Clausen announced he was suing the Fox Network for his removal from the show, saying that he was fired due to ageism and disability discrimination, though the producers claimed that Clausen was fired for an inability to work with more modern music styles. After a portion was dismissed in August 2020, Clausen dropped the suit entirely in January 2022.

== Personal life and death ==
In April 2020, Clausen revealed he had been diagnosed with Parkinson's disease, though it was subsequently reported that his illness was progressive supranuclear palsy, which is often initially misdiagnosed as Parkinson's. Clausen died at his home in Los Angeles, on May 29, 2025, at the age of 84.

== Discography ==
- Songs in the Key of Springfield
- Go Simpsonic with The Simpsons
- Testify
- Swing Can Really Hang You Up The Most – Alf Clausen Jazz Orchestra (ArtistShare)
- Orchestral arrangements on John Denver's Higher Ground
- "'Round Midnight" — Buddy Greco
- "The Misfit" — Erick Nelson and Michele Pillar
- "Pearls" — The John (Terry) Tirabasso Orchestra
- "Secret Fantasy" — Mike Campbell
