= The Ned-Liest Catch =

- The Simpsons episode
- Episode no.: Season 22; Episode 22
- Directed by: Chuck Sheetz
- Written by: Jeff Westbrook
- Production code: NABF15
- Original air date: May 22, 2011

Guest appearances
- Ken Burns as himself; Joey Kramer as himself; Marcia Wallace as Edna Krabappel

Episode chronology
← Previous "500 Keys"	Next → "The Falcon and the D'ohman"
- The Simpsons season 22

"The Ned-Liest Catch" is the twenty-second and final episode of the twenty-second season of the American animated television series The Simpsons. The episode was directed by Chuck Sheetz and written by Jeff Westbrook. It originally aired on the Fox network in the United States on May 22, 2011.

This is the second season finale to end on a cliffhanger, with the first being the first part of "Who Shot Mr. Burns?" from the sixth season. It is the third episode and the second one from season 22 (the other being "The Great Simpsina") to have no chalkboard gag, couch gag or opening credits on a television. (Note: The first one was "Sideshow Bob Roberts" from season 6, which aired 17 years earlier.) It was also the first episode to cut from the clouds to the start of the episode itself.

The episode sees Edna Krabappel and Ned Flanders begin dating, their relationship being left to the public vote. It has been followed by "The Falcon and the D'ohman," which revealed that they are still together, and "Ned 'n' Edna's Blend Agenda," which revealed that they have since married.

== Plot ==
Edna Krabappel is suspended from teaching by Superintendent Chalmers with full pay after Bart pulls a prank that leads Edna to slap him twice on the back of the head. Chalmers orders Edna to report to a rubber room where teachers spend agonizing days waiting until their fates are decided. Bart feels guilty about his behavior and helps Edna escape detention. When she uses a ladder outside the window to leave the building, it collapses but Ned Flanders winds up catching and saving her. Ned takes Edna out to lunch, and the two bond.

Ned and Edna start dating, and Edna is thrilled when Chalmers lets her return to teaching as long as she also does some weekend work as a prison guard. However, their relationship causes problems with Homer and Bart; Edna's constant visits to the Flanders home make it more difficult for Bart to ignore his homework, and Edna later chastises Homer over his rudeness to Ned and forces him to return everything he borrowed from Ned over the years.

Homer schemes with Bart to drive apart Ned and Edna, with Homer taking Ned to Moe's to convince him to remain single and Bart using the Cinderella fairy tale to scare Rod and Todd into believing Edna will become a "wicked stepmother". The plan fails as Rod and Todd reveal they already do the same household chores as Cinderella. At Moe's, Homer sees that Ned truly does love Edna and decides to support their relationship. Unfortunately, the other barflies then make references to Edna's extensive dating history, and Ned is surprised that she has been with many of Springfield's men, including Aerosmith drummer Joey Kramer. When he meets up with Edna, Ned runs away in horror from her, and angrily gives Homer the silent treatment.

At Marge's urging, Homer follows him and makes some points that make Ned think. Ned tells Edna he forgives her, but Edna is appalled by his statement and accuses him of judging her. She then tells him that, if they are going to stay together, her past must never get in their way. Ned says that the decision has to be left to a higher power.

The episode and the season ends on a cliffhanger with Homer and Marge giving a link to TheSimpsons.com and encouraging viewers to vote on whether Ned and Edna should stay together, with the results to be revealed at the end of the first episode of the 23rd season.

== Production ==
On The Simpsons, when characters become couples, they usually break up at the end of the episodes. Executive producer Al Jean said in an interview that the writers decided it would not be interesting for them to do another episode where a relationship ended, and they thought it would be interesting "to see what people think, [...] the Internet certainly has a lot of opinion on the show, might as well have them have their say." When asked why the writers thought Ned and Edna were the right characters for a cliffhanger like this, Jean said that "In life, unusual things happen. People couple together in ways you would not expect, and he's single and she's single. We thought it would be funny, the fact that they both have these connections to the Simpsons, but they never really met or if they have met it was minimal."

The fate of the "Nedna" relationship being left to a public vote made this the second cliffhanger episode of The Simpsons. (Note: The first being "Who Shot Mr. Burns?" 16 years earlier.) The cliffhanger was resolved midway through the 23rd season premiere "The Falcon and the D'ohman" by revealing Ned and Edna were still a couple, as the real-world poll overwhelmingly voted to keep them together.

Musician Joey Kramer of Aerosmith plays himself, having previously appeared as part of Aerosmith in the third season episode "Flaming Moe's."

== Reception ==
In its original American broadcast, "The Ned-Liest Catch" was viewed by an estimated 5.25 million households and received a 2.5 rating/7 share among adults between the ages of 18 and 49. (Note: This means that it was seen by 2.5% of all American 18- to 49-year-olds, and 7% of all 18- to 49-year-olds watching television at the time of the broadcast.) The episode stayed even with the ratings from the previous episode, "500 Keys."

Rowan Kaiser of The A.V. Club gave the episode a C. Kaiser liked Bart's misbehavior and the resultant commentary on the American education system but disliked Ned and Edna's pairing and the subsequent audience participation stunt.

Eric Hochberger of TV Fanatic gave the episode 3.8 out of 5 stars. He highlighted the scene of Ned seeing Edna's past lovers as he tries to kiss her, and he enjoyed Ned and Homer bonding.

== Reruns ==
Reruns feature an alternate version of the episode's credits, with Marge informing the audience that it is now too late to vote. Homer then insults the show's viewers, but Marge corrects him, saying there is plenty for the fans to check out on TheSimpsons.com, and advises them to watch the next episode in order to find out the results of the Ned and Edna relationship.

Following the October 2013 death of Marcia Wallace, Fox paid tribute to her with a re-broadcast of "The Ned-Liest Catch" preceding the premiere of "Four Regrettings and a Funeral"; the latter's chalkboard gag consisted of a single "We'll really miss you Mrs. K." Fox originally announced that the third season episode "Bart the Lover" would air as the tribute but was unable to obtain clearance to air the episode in time.

== Sequel ==
"The Ned-Liest Catch" was shortly followed by "Ned 'n' Edna's Blend Agenda" the twenty-first episode of the 23rd season.
