= Treehouse of Horror XX =

- The Simpsons episode
- Promotional Image
- Episode no.: Season 21; Episode 4
- Directed by: Mike B. Anderson; Matthew Schofield
- Written by: Daniel Chun
- Production code: LABF14
- Original air date: October 18, 2009

Guest appearance
- Marcia Wallace as Edna Krabappel

Episode chronology
← Previous "The Great Wife Hope"	Next → "The Devil Wears Nada"
- The Simpsons season 21

"Treehouse of Horror XX" is the fourth episode of the twenty-first season of the American animated television series The Simpsons. The episode was directed by Mike B. Anderson and Matthew Schofield and was written by Daniel Chun. It first aired on the Fox network in the United States on October 18, 2009.

This is the twentieth "Treehouse of Horror" installment, containing three self-contained stories: In "Dial 'M' for Murder or Press '#' to Return to Main Menu", Lisa is forced into a Hitchcock-esque murder scheme by Bart; in "Don't Have a Cow, Mankind", Springfield is once again overrun by zombies thanks to Krusty Burger's latest sandwich; and in the Sweeney Todd parody, "There's No Business Like Moe Business", Moe the Bartender bleeds Homer dry to create the perfect microbrewed beer. This is the first "Treehouse of Horror" episode for many things: airing in the month of October since "Treehouse of Horror X" a decade prior, being produced in high definition, and with opening production credits that are white rather than the customary green.

An estimated 8.59 million viewers tuned in to watch the episode.

== Plot ==
=== Opening ===
Traditional horror movie characters such as Frankenstein's Monster, the Mummy, the Wolf Man, and Dracula roam the streets of Springfield on Halloween night. After they are teased by Dolph, Jimbo, and Kearney, they get new, more modern costumes from a Halloween store. They then go to an adult Halloween party thrown by Homer and Marge and hook up with the single women there, but are soon confronted by their wives, who are angry that their husbands lied about going out to kill children tonight. Homer tries to intervene as the wives begin to assault their husbands, only to be decapitated, and his eyes are then replaced with two red x's, the title of the episode then appears onscreen.

=== Dial "M" for Murder or Press "#" to Return to Main Menu ===
In this black-and-white segment and a parody of Alfred Hitchcock's films, Lisa wants revenge after being sent to detention by Ms. Hoover for disrupting class as she claims another student topped her through a tutor. Bart, who also got sent to detention per usual, hatches a "criss-cross" plan and tells Lisa that if she pulls a "ding-dong ditch" on Mrs. Krabappel, he will do the same to Ms. Hoover. Lisa thinks this means ringing the bell at Mrs. Krabappel's apartment and leaving. However, Lisa soon learns that Bart meant for her to kill Mrs. Krabappel (and dump the corpse in a ditch), as he has killed Ms. Hoover and actually believes the words "prank" and "kill" to be synonymous. Bart attempts to coax Lisa into killing Mrs. Krabappel with a paper cutter, but she refuses. Eventually, Bart decides to blackmail her into it with help from Willie, who would frame Lisa for the decapitated Skinner to honor his side of the "criss-cross" in which Bart killed Skinner. Realizing that Bart would frame her for these incidents, Lisa tricks him into believing that she was submitting at his will only to get a knife from his hands and attempts to kill Bart in self-defense, beginning a chase sequence. Bart finally finds shelter at a crowded playground carousel, but is left at Lisa's mercy when the other children leave to get ice cream. Lisa, however, recognizing that she would not be better than Bart, says she will never be a murderer, and attempts to throw the knife away. The knife cycles out of control and ends up nailing Bart in the head, much to her shock just as Mrs. Krabappel appears, pleased at his death. Lisa later agrees that it is better this way and she and Krabappel walk away smiling.

=== Don't Have a Cow, Mankind ===
Krusty the Clown introduces a new version of his Krusty Burger, the Burger^{2}, made from cattle that have eaten other cattle in their feed. Upon eating a burger on live television, Kent Brockman begins to comment on the taste before turning gray, red-eyed, and cannibalistic, starting a chain reaction of people getting attacked and eaten. Twenty-eight days later, Springfield has become overrun by zombies called munchers. The Simpsons are established to be among the few survivors.

One day, Bart, tired of eating fruit, escapes from his family's barricaded house and eats one of the tainted burgers, but turns out to be immune to its effects. Over the phone, a besieged Dr. Hibbert tells them that Bart's immunity may be the key to developing a cure to the muncher epidemic and that they must bring Bart to a so-called "safe zone" being established in Shelbyville. The Simpsons are attacked after a failed attempt to sneak out but are saved by Apu, driving an armored off-road truck. Apu explains that he was never infected because, as a vegetarian, he did not eat any of the tainted beef, and as a convenience store owner, he is "armed to the teeth" (with a large arsenal of military-grade firearms).

The group tries to leave Springfield, but Apu crashes the truck on top of a pile of smashed cars at the edge of town. Apu goes to push the car off the pile, but the Simpsons drive away thinking Apu sacrificed himself, when he actually wanted the Simpsons to wait for him. After Apu is killed by the munchers, the Simpsons drive on but run out of gas in the middle of the highway, walking the remaining 20 miles to the safe zone. During their journey, Homer is bitten by Mr. Burns, thus turning him into a muncher himself. The family decide not to kill him in the hopes of finding a cure. They reach the safe zone, where Bart, being immune to the virus, is worshiped as the "chosen one". However, the people there believe that cannibalizing Bart will save them from the virus. The Simpsons think of another solution: vaccinating the remaining populace (except Homer who either refuses to get cured or Bart refused to cure him as payback for being abusive to him earlier) by having Bart bathe in their food before eating it.

=== There's No Business Like Moe Business ===
In a parody of Sweeney Todd: The Demon Barber of Fleet Street, presented as a stage musical, Moe is lonely and upset that he does not have a girlfriend and is envious when he sees Homer and Marge together. When Homer falls into the basement of the bar and is impaled by the microbrew pipes, his blood becomes the secret ingredient in Moe's new beer. Everyone loves this new beer, saying that it makes them feel warm, secure and cozy on the inside. Moe uses this to his advantage and woos Marge, tricking her into thinking that Homer came out of the closet as gay and left Marge, when in reality, Homer is slowly dying from losing blood. Homer emerges, alive, despite being impaled by Moe's microbrew machine, hurls Moe (represented as a dummy) across the room, and reunites with Marge.

=== Ending ===
The whole audience except for Kang and Kodos gathers onstage and conclude the episode by singing "Number XX". Kang and Kodos, are however, present in the audience with one shushing the people, and the other asleep who is then awakened by the former that the show is over.

== Cultural references ==
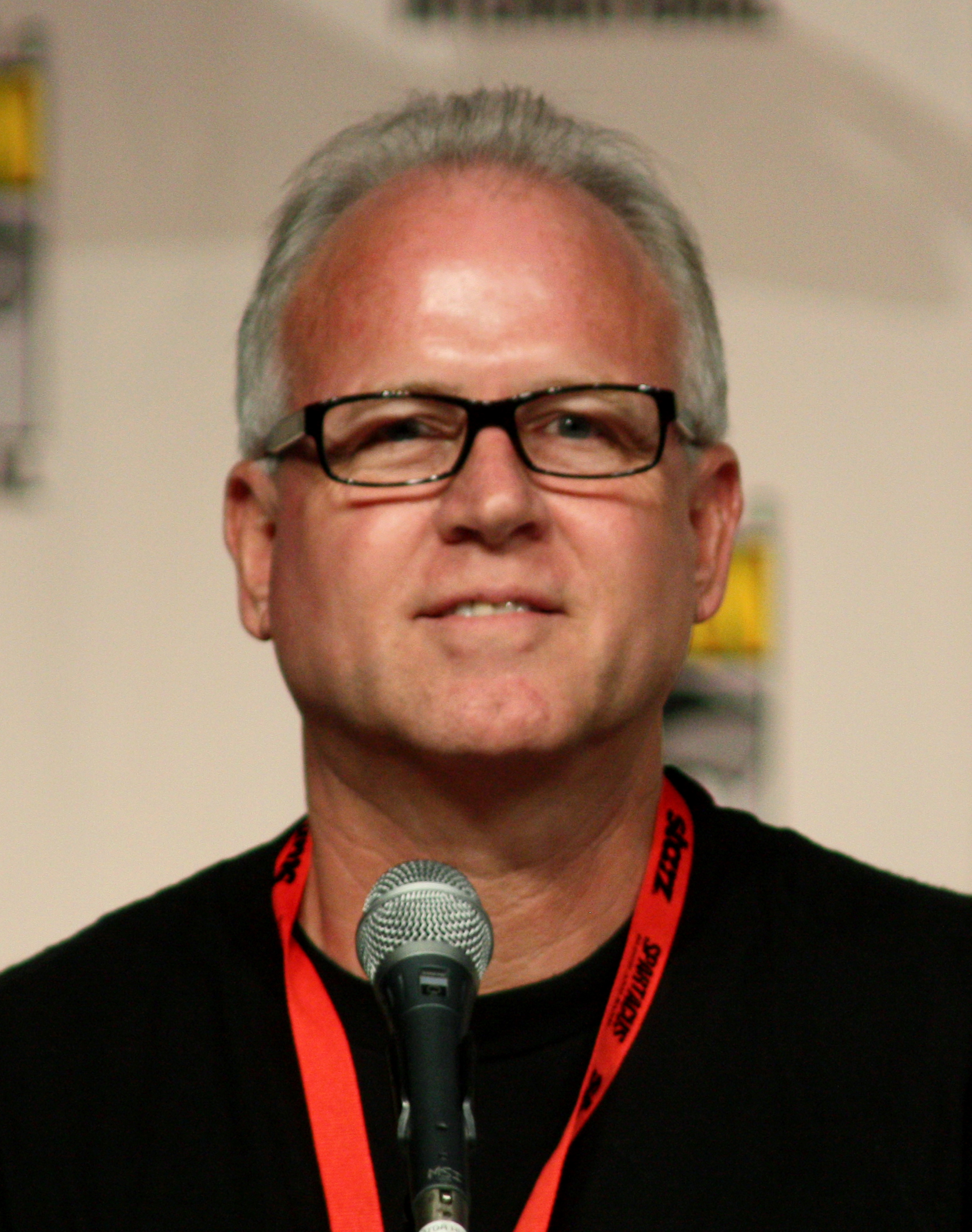
Mike B. Anderson directed the episode.

In the opening scene of the episode, the monsters respectively wear costumes of Iron Man, Harry Potter, SpongeBob SquarePants and Jack Sparrow.

The first segment includes numerous parodies of Alfred Hitchcock's films. The plot of the segment is a parody of Strangers on a Train, while Psycho, North by Northwest, Spellbound, and Vertigo are also referenced (in particular the Vertigo effect). The main theme from Psycho by Bernard Herrmann is used extensively during the first part. The title of the segment is a reference to Dial M for Murder.

The second segment is a parody of various post apocalyptic films, mainly 28 Days Later, Children of Men and I Am Legend. The title of the segment takes its name from Bart's catchphrase, Don't have a cow, man. This segment has no music until the zombie apocalypse ends.

The title of "There's No Business Like Moe Business" is a parody of the song "There's No Business Like Show Business" from Annie Get Your Gun. The plot of the segment is a parody of the musical Sweeney Todd: The Demon Barber of Fleet Street.

== Reception ==
=== Viewing figures ===
In its original American broadcast, "Treehouse of Horror XX" was watched by 8.59 million viewers and was the most watched of Fox's Animation Domination, ahead of American Dad! and The Cleveland Show. The show was the fourth most watched show of the week on Fox after House, The OT, and Family Guy in the 18/49 rating.

=== Critical response ===
Robert Canning of IGN praised the episode, saying "it was a fine addition to the series' Halloween specials". He enjoyed all of the stories, and said that the Sweeney Todd segment was "a nice treat". He also said that the airing of this Treehouse of Horror episode before Halloween, the first time that this had happened in ten years, "[had to] count for something".

Emily VanDerWerff of The A.V. Club gave the episode a B. She did not find the Hitchcock parody funny, but praised the animation. She found the zombie parody to be the funniest segment. She wanted the third segment to be more connected with Sweeney Todd.

Screen Rant called it the best episode of the 21st season.

=== Awards and nominations ===
The episode won the Annie Award for Outstanding Achievement for Writing in an Animated Television/Broadcast Production at the 37th Annie Awards.
