= The Great Wife Hope =

- The Simpsons episode
- Episode no.: Season 21; Episode 3
- Directed by: Matthew Faughnan
- Written by: Carolyn Omine
- Production code: LABF16
- Original air date: October 11, 2009

Guest appearances
- Chuck Liddell as himself; Marcia Wallace as Edna Krabappel

Episode features
- Chalkboard gag: "I am not allergic to long division"
- Couch gag: Repeat of the couch gag from "Take My Life, Please".
- Commentary: Al Jean: Carolyn Omine; Matt Groening

Episode chronology
← Previous "Bart Gets a 'Z'"	Next → "Treehouse of Horror XX"
- The Simpsons season 21

"The Great Wife Hope" is the third episode of the twenty-first season of the American animated television series The Simpsons. Originally broadcast on the Fox network in the United States on October 11, 2009, it sees the men of Springfield taking immense interest in a new combat sport called mixed martial arts (MMA). Marge is appalled by the violent sport and demands that the creator put a stop to it, but he agrees only if she will fight him in a match and win.

"The Great Wife Hope" was written by Carolyn Omine and directed by Matthew Faughnan. Former Ultimate Fighting Championship (UFC) champion Chuck Liddell guest starred in it as himself. The episode featured multiple cultural references to fighting moves and positions, along with a single reference to professional wrestling promotion owner Vince McMahon.

Since airing, the episode has received generally positive reviews from television critics, particularly towards the final scene. It received a 4.3/7 Nielsen rating with adults ages 18–49, behind all other programs aimed at that demographic in its timeslot.

== Plot ==
The men of Springfield become obsessed with a violent new string of mixed martial arts (MMA) competitions called "Ultimate Punch Kick and Choke Championships" (UPKCC). The kids soon begin to fight in small MMA matches of their own at the playground of Springfield Elementary School. While Bart and Nelson are fighting in one match, Marge sees them and is disgusted by the violent nature of the entire sport. She and a group of concerned women begin protesting the sport in front of the MMA stadium. Marge decides to go on stage before a match begins and demands that everyone cease the sport entirely. Chett Englebrit (patterned after actual fight promoter Roy Englebrecht), creator of the sport, agrees with Marge - but only if she can fight him and win.

Marge begins to train for the event, practicing rhythmic gymnastics. However, the family believes that her methods are unsuitable for the extreme task at hand and get her professional help. She learns boxing from Dredrick Tatum, wrestling from former Yale wrestler Mr. Burns, jujitsu and Judo from Akira, and bullying from Jimbo, Dolph and Kearney. Now fully trained, she enters the ring (after the announcer introduces her as one of his "Moms I'd Like to Fight") with Englebrit and is immediately knocked to the ground. Bart runs into the ring to defend his mother, but Englebrit brutally beats him to a pulp instead. Marge witnesses this and knocks Englebrit out with a roundhouse kick, winning their bet. Marge pulls down the ring's microphone and begins to give a speech, having had a change of heart about the demise of the violent sport upon having discovered her own dark side. She realizes, however, that everyone has already left the building to watch a drunken brawl in the parking lot.

As Marge and Homer leave to have some MMA-inspired sex, Bart and Lisa enter the empty ring and decide to settle their lifelong sibling feud then and there. As they approach each other to throw a punch, the closing credits begins before returning to the scene where Lisa easily knocks out Bart.

== Production and cultural references ==
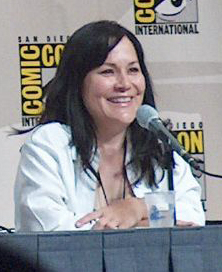
Carolyn Omine wrote the episode.

"The Great Wife Hope" was written by Carolyn Omine and directed by Matthew Faughnan. The writers of The Simpsons had a vast amount of knowledge and appreciation for mixed martial arts and included multiple references and themes of the sport throughout the episode. Former Ultimate Fighter champion Chuck Liddell guest starred as himself, signing photographs for fans, including Bart, at a cost of $25. Liddell commented that being a guest star was "very cool" and that the recording sessions were "easy".

The episode is a satire of the combat sport of mixed martial arts. Throughout the episode, characters perform multiple fighting moves and positions. For example, Bart puts Nelson in a triangle choke at the playground when the two are fighting, while Marge takes out Englebrit with a flying armbar. Marge explains in the beginning of the episode that she found out about a creative new sport called "Crazy Bowling" by typing in "girls having fun"—after ignoring several thousand pages of porn—into the search engine Google. Also, H.R. Pufnstuf is parodied as HufnStuf on Ice, because Englebrit's assistant claims the next day, Hufnstuf on Ice will need the space.

Marge claims that the word Ultimate makes everything worse, though Otto Mann protests that it does not affect the popular sport Ultimate Frisbee. Englebrit carries similar traits to the professional wrestling promoter Vince McMahon. Marge initially tries to train for the match by performing rhythmic gymnastics. She practices boxing with a character named Dredrick Tatum, who is a parody of renowned boxer Mike Tyson.

== Reception ==
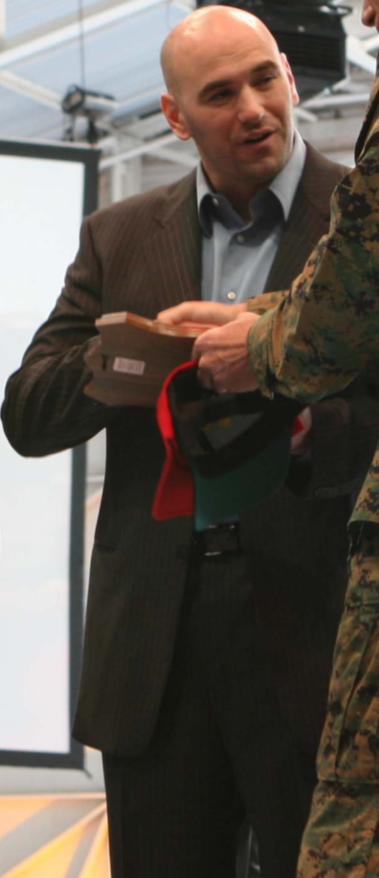
Dana White openly criticized the episode for its portrayal of MMA.

"The Great Wife Hope" originally aired in the United States on October 11, 2009, on the Fox network. In this initial broadcast, it received a Nielsen rating of 4.3/7, totaling 7.5 million viewers in the 18-19 demographic.

The episode received generally positive reviews from television critics. IGN reporter Robert Canning gave the episode a 7.7/10 rating ("Good"), commenting that "what really made me enjoy 'The Great Wife Hope' were the peripheral bits, characters and jokes outside the main storyline. There were many, and they were funny.

Emily VanDerWerff of The A.V. Club, giving the episode a "B", wrote that it had "some amusing detours along the way". She compared "The Great Wife Hope" positively to season two's "Itchy & Scratchy & Marge", writing that Marge's attempts to bring down the MMA sport is the parallel to her trying to bring The Itchy & Scratchy Show off the air due to its severe cartoon violence in the latter episode. The staff of the website MMAjunkie said the episode was a sign that MMA had "truly made it" and fans of the sport could appreciate the writer's knowledge on the topic.

Among more negative reviews include Jason Hughes of TV Squad, who commented that several jokes in the episode did not work, such as the reveal that Krusty the Clown has been sleeping with Sideshow Mel's wife for several years, though he did enjoy most of the other jokes and applauded the development of Nelson's character.

Dana White, president of Ultimate Fighting Championship (UFC), told reporters that he did not like the episode. He added, "People like the [mixed martial arts] media always try to tell me that we're mainstream. [...] Did you see that Simpsons episode? Chuck Liddell signs an autograph for somebody, and he says, 'That will be $45, please'. The sport isn't like that at all. Then the promoter of the show fights Marge Simpson in the octagon, sucker-punches her in the face, and then says, 'You're the only woman I've ever hit that I didn't love'. That's the way mainstream looks at us and thinks of us, and I know that."

The final scene in the episode, featuring Bart and Lisa fighting in the arena, has received overwhelmingly positive remarks from reviewers. Canning wrote that it was "a classic moment for the series [...] This almost felt like a moment that could have closed out the series." Hughes commented that it was "the best moment of the night" as it "would have been a typical ending" if it had not added the twist preceding the credits. Melissa and Randall Baker of TV Guide magazine said that the scene was a moment of Bart and Lisa knocks out without a punch.
