= Bart Gets a "Z" =

"Bart Gets a 'Z'"
- The Simpsons episode
- Episode no.: Season 21; Episode 2
- Directed by: Mark Kirkland
- Written by: Matt Selman
- Production code: LABF15
- Original air date: October 4, 2009

Guest appearance
- Marcia Wallace as Edna Krabappel

Episode features
- Chalkboard gag: "Chalkboarding is not torture"
- Couch gag: The Simpsons, wearing cowboy hats, exchange gunfire around the couch.
- Commentary: Mark Kirkland; Matt Groening; Al Jean; Pamela Hayden

Episode chronology
← Previous "Homer the Whopper"	Next → "The Great Wife Hope"
- The Simpsons season 21

"Bart Gets a 'Z'" is the second episode of the twenty-first season of the American animated television series The Simpsons. It originally aired on the Fox network in the United States on October 4, 2009. The episode was written by Matt Selman and directed by Mark Kirkland.

In the episode, the fourth grade students of Springfield Elementary School decide to spike Edna Krabappel's coffee in order to teach her a lesson after she takes away their cell phones. She is fired by Principal Skinner, who hires a new teacher named Zachary Vaughn. Although Vaughn is a hip young teacher who impresses the students, Bart is plagued by guilt and tries to get Edna hired back.

In its original airing, the episode had an estimated 9.32 million viewers and received a Nielsen rating of 5.1/8. The episode received mixed reviews.

== Plot ==
Edna Krabappel's already-limited optimism is fully crushed when she sees her students distracted by their cell phones, so she takes the devices away. This angers Bart and the other children, and Edna fails to reach them with analog teaching efforts. The kids decide Edna needs to "chill out" occasionally, and Bart sees that Homer is easy-going after having a few beers, so the students spike Edna's coffee with liquor they steal from their parents. The next day, once she has consumed a mug of spiked coffee, Edna becomes intoxicated. She sings loudly and off-key with her students, flirts with Dewey Largo, and disrupts an assembly.

Principal Skinner is forced to fire Edna and replaces her with recent graduate and first-time teacher Zachary Vaughn. The students are impressed with Zack as he returns their cell phones and instructs them to use their devices for classwork. Bart raves to his mother about how fun Zack is, but Marge worries about Edna's well-being, and Lisa doubts Zack's ability to teach. Bart visits Edna and feels guilty seeing her moping in front of the television and plots to get her rehired. He meets Milhouse at a bookstore where they buy a self-help book based on finding "The Answer". Edna is skeptical but reveals her dream to own a muffin shop, which she successfully opens. However, when Bart confesses he had the idea to spike her coffee and is responsible for getting her fired, Edna is furious, telling him that her real dream was to be a teacher and is now facing debt and competition from other muffin stores. Destroying the self-help book, Edna declares that Bart is "bad on the inside".

Bart, troubled by Edna's comment and not really consoled by Homer saying he's not bad on the inside but has surface levels of badness that reach almost to his core, sneaks into the school at night to spike Zack's energy drink and get Edna's job back but cannot go through with it. Instead, he tells Skinner the truth to face punishment. Skinner is pleased that Bart was honest and agrees to punish him but he cannot rehire Edna when Zack is doing a good job. They are disrupted by a drunk Zack who secretly mixes vodka in his own drink and mocks the schoolchildren. Groundskeeper Willie drags Zack away, and Edna is reinstated. Bart hopes that there are no hard feelings between Edna and himself. She responds by making every student in the class eat a stale muffin as payback.

== Production ==
The episode was written by Matt Selman, and directed by Mark Kirkland, marking the pair's writing and directorial debuts for the season. On Twitter, Selman said that the episode title was widely and wrongly assumed to be a simple play on words where the "Z" referred to Bart's new teacher being named Zachary; in fact, the title was devised during an early script where Zach's meltdown started with him giving all of the students "Z's" for their grades because he was staggeringly drunk, and even after it was decided to present Zach's meltdown differently everyone liked the title and kept it anyway.

== Cultural references ==
The episode name is a reference to the name of the Season 2 episode "Bart Gets an 'F'", which was also referenced in the same season episode "Bart's Dog Gets an "F"", and the Season 10 episode "Lisa Gets an 'A'". The novel Bart reads called "The Answer" is a parody of film and book, The Secret. The song heard with Edna in the morning is a Paul McCartney song titled "Another Day". The store Mrs. Krabappel opens is called "Edna's Edibles", a reference to the store that Mrs. Garrett owned on The Facts of Life. Another muffin store on the street is called "H.R. Muffin Stuff", a reference to the 1969 show H.R. Pufnstuf. The film Edna is watching when Bart comes by to see how she is doing both parodies and references the 1986 Rodney Dangerfield film Back to School.

== Reception ==
In its original airing, the episode had an estimated 9.32 million viewers and received a Nielsen rating of 5.1/8.

Robert Canning of IGN gave the episode a 6.9/10 and also stated the episode was "...neither hilarious nor incredibly terrible. It's middle of the road, but has just enough going for it that a fan will enjoy the episode."

Emily VanDerWerff of The A.V. Club gave the episode a C+ and also stated "So I liked the Krabappel and Bart stuff, but everything else was pretty bad."

After the death of Marcia Wallace in 2013, Entertainment Weekly named this episode as one of the best episodes featuring Edna Krabappel. It highlighted the reprimand Edna gives Bart where she calls him "bad on the inside."
