= The Falcon and the D'ohman =

- The Simpsons episode
- Homer and Wayne
- Episode no.: Season 23; Episode 1
- Directed by: Matthew Nastuk
- Written by: Justin Hurwitz
- Production code: NABF16
- Original air date: September 25, 2011

Guest appearances
- Tom Colicchio as himself; Kevin Michael Richardson as SendEx Courier; Kiefer Sutherland as Wayne; Marcia Wallace as Edna Krabappel

Episode chronology
← Previous "The Ned-Liest Catch"	Next → "Bart Stops to Smell the Roosevelts"
- The Simpsons season 23

"The Falcon and the D'ohman" is the twenty-third season premiere of the American animated television series The Simpsons. It originally aired on the Fox network in the United States on September 25, 2011. In the episode, the Springfield Nuclear Power Plant hires a new security guard named Wayne and Homer soon becomes friends with him. "The Falcon and the D'ohman" also reveals the fate of the relationship between the characters Ned Flanders and Edna Krabappel that was initiated in the previous episode of the series, "The Ned-Liest Catch", that aired in May 2011.

Actor Kiefer Sutherland guest starred in the episode as the voice of Wayne. This was the third time he appeared on The Simpsons. The episode also features a guest appearance by American chef and Top Chef judge Tom Colicchio as himself in a segment in which Marge dreams about being a contestant in a show similar to Top Chef. "The Falcon and the D'ohman" has received mixed reviews from television critics, with criticism directed at the plot and the cultural references featured. However, a reference in the episode to the animated re-enactments of news stories done by the Taiwan-based Next Media Animation has been particularly praised.

== Background ==
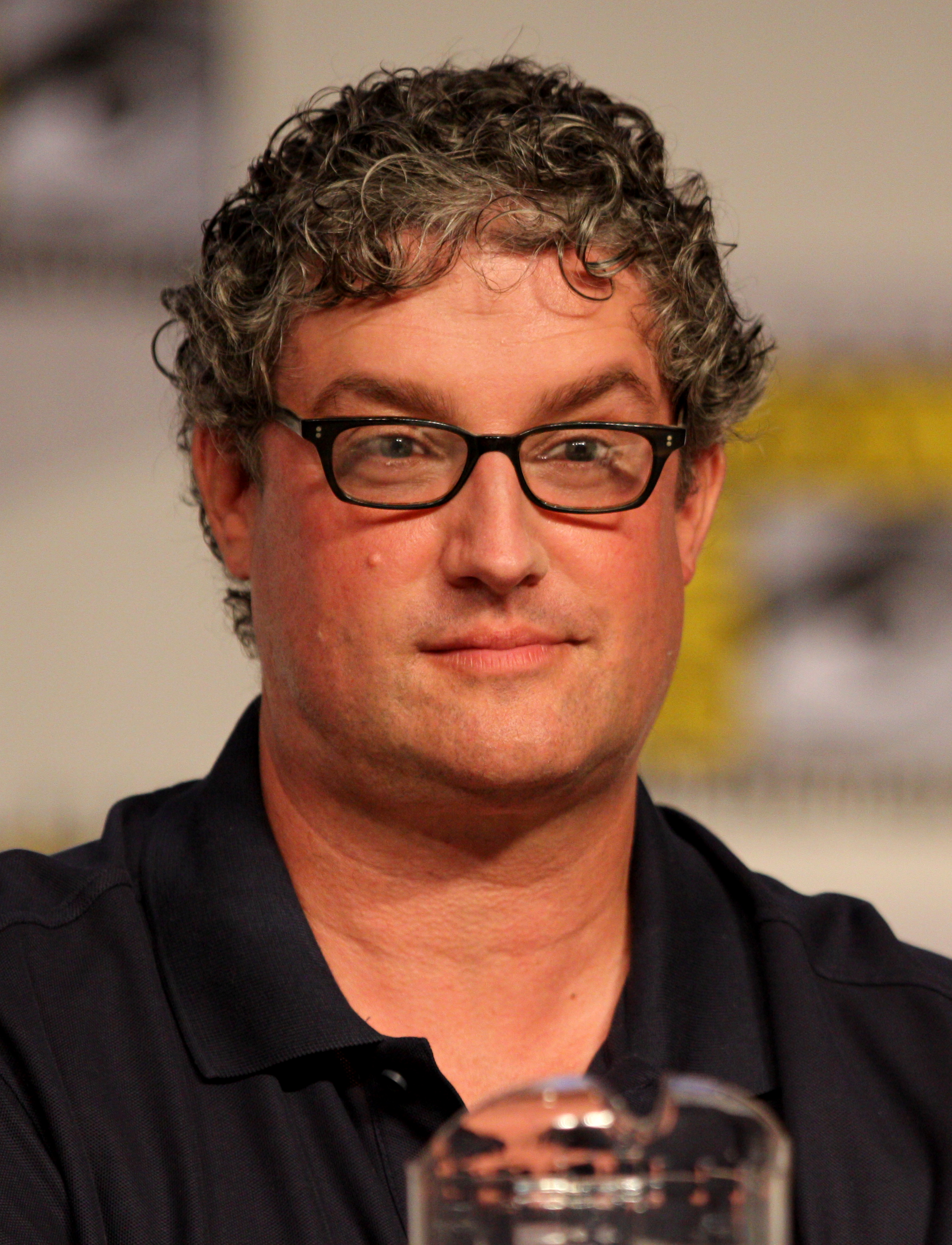
Al Jean, executive producer of The Simpsons

"The Falcon and the D'ohman" features a reference to the previous episode of the series, the twenty-second season finale "The Ned-Liest Catch" that aired on May 22, 2011. In that episode, the characters Ned Flanders and Edna Krabappel start dating. The episode ends with Homer and Marge Simpson giving viewers a link to the official The Simpsons website, TheSimpsons.com, and encouraging them to go on the website and vote over the 2011 summer on whether Ned and Edna should stay together. The result of the poll was revealed in "The Falcon and the D'ohman"—a majority had voted for the couple to remain in a relationship. According to executive producer Al Jean, the poll was "very strong in one direction". In an interview before the result was presented, Jean guaranteed that the poll was authentic and that the writers would not undo the viewers' decision, adding "What the fans have joined together, let no writer put asunder."

== Plot ==
Comic Book Guy opens the season premiere by telling the viewers that there will be hints in the episode as to the outcome of the poll regarding the romance between Ned and Edna.

Homer sneaks late into work at the Springfield Nuclear Power Plant, sings to the tune of The Police's "Walking on the Moon", and marks up his time card to make it seem like he was on time and had put in some overtime hours. Homer is surprised to find that a new security guard named Wayne has been hired, and repeatedly tries to befriend him, only to be rebuffed. One night, while Wayne is walking home in the rain and hail, he reluctantly agrees to let Homer drive him to Moe's Tavern for a drink, though insists they remain professional afterwards. While Wayne is in the bathroom, Snake dramatically crashes through the door on his motorcycle to rob everyone. As soon as Wayne comes out, he soundly beats up Snake. The story spreads quickly and a news segment that features an interview with Wayne by Kent Brockman and an animated Taiwanese dramatization of the incident soon airs on television. It is discovered that Wayne is a highly-trained former CIA black ops agent, who decided to go into hiding in Springfield. He is plagued by recurring flashbacks from his previous missions, which cause him to act or shout them out, as evidenced when he unintentionally attacks Mr. Burns, the boss of the power plant, which results in Wayne being fired.

Because Wayne can no longer afford his apartment, Homer lets Wayne sleep in Bart's treehouse. However, Wayne speaks loudly about past missions in his sleep, causing the couples in the nearby houses to lose sleep. Ned and Edna are one of these couples, and they are shown holding each other in bed as Edna winks at the camera (confirming that the Season 22 finale poll asking the audience if they should remain a couple came back as "Yes!"). News of what happened to Burns spreads to YouTube and is seen by one of Wayne's gangster enemies, Viktor, in Kyiv, Ukraine. Apparently, Wayne accidentally killed Viktor's wife with a stray bullet on a previous mission. Thus, the Ukrainian gangster and his henchmen kidnap and torture Homer as bait to lure Wayne. Wayne tracks Homer down through tracking devices he unknowingly ate, frees him and kills all of the Ukrainian gangsters, including Viktor, with help from Homer.

Afterwards, Wayne repays Homer for his help by giving him the fist pound he wanted when they first met, and considers leaving Springfield, but Marge suggests that Wayne get a job at the Springfield Department of Motor Vehicles instead. At the DMV, he has a flashback to the time he was a prisoner in North Korea and was forced to write Being Short is Not a Hindrance to Greatness, a ridiculous musical play paying tribute to Kim Jong Il.

During the closing credits, Ned and Edna thank the fans for voting for their relationship to continue. Seymour Skinner tries to protest, but Agnes, who approves of the outcome, rebukes him for waiting until the polls had closed to offer his opinion.

== Production ==
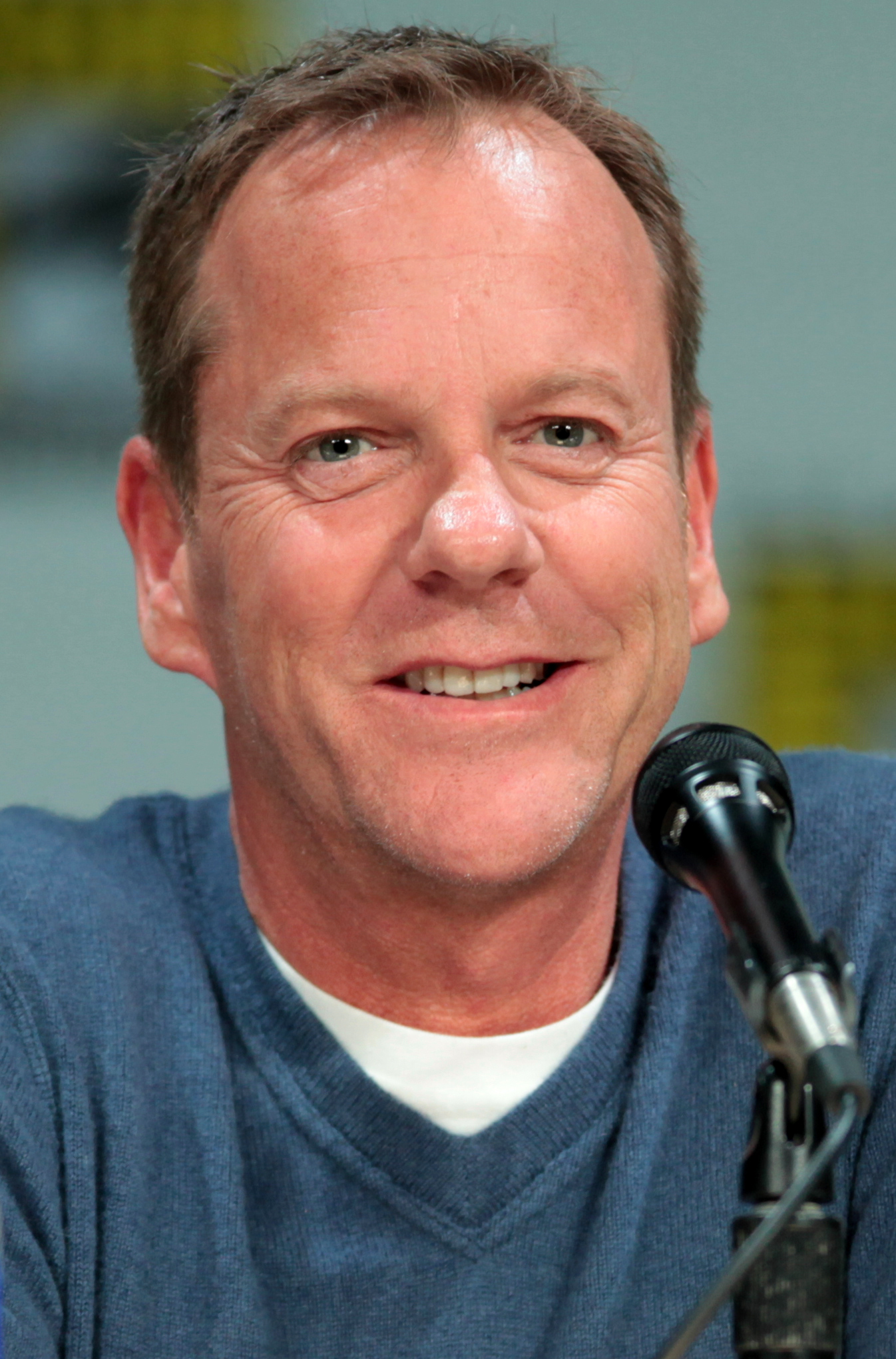
The episode marks the third guest appearance from actor Kiefer Sutherland on The Simpsons

"The Falcon and the D'ohman" was written by Justin Hurwitz and directed by Matthew Nastuk. The storyline of the episode resembles David Cronenberg's film A History of Violence. "The Falcon and the D'ohman" features several references to popular culture. For example, in a sequence at the beginning of the episode, Homer sings about working at the power plant to the melody of The Police's song "Walking on the Moon". According to Chris Ledesma, music editor on The Simpsons, the staff was "very fortunate to have obtained the original master tracks from The Police without vocals. This is a rare instance. When we need to do our own lyrics to an established hit song, [composer Alf Clausen] usually arranges and records a 'sound-alike' that tries to capture all the spirit and nuance of the original so that the audience immediately identifies the track, but allows us to add our own vocals." The episode also made frequent use of the sequence "Dance of the Knights" from the ballet Romeo and Juliet by Sergei Prokofiev. The sequence had to be licensed, as it was under copyright in most parts of the world. The title of the episode is a play on the movie The Falcon and the Snowman.

Another cultural reference appears in one of Wayne's flashbacks, in which he is seen receiving special training against enemies such as Chucky from the Child's Play film and basketball player Kobe Bryant. The Taiwanese dramatization of Wayne's fight with Snake at Moe's Tavern parodies the humorous computer animated re-enactments of news stories done by the Taiwan-based Next Media Animation. One YouTube clip that Viktor sees is a reference to The Gregory Brothers, the creators of the popular online Auto-Tune the News series, in that a news segment featuring a lady who has lost her cat has been autotuned into a song. Marge's dream of becoming a contestant in a cooking competition parodies the American reality competition series Top Chef. American chef Tom Colicchio, who is a judge on that show, guest starred in "The Falcon and the D'ohman" as himself.

Canadian actor Kiefer Sutherland guest starred in "The Falcon and the D'ohman" as the security guard Wayne. This was the third episode of The Simpsons that he appeared in, the first being the 2006 episode "G.I. (Annoyed Grunt)" (playing a colonel) and the second being the 2007 episode "24 Minutes" (playing his character Jack Bauer from the television series 24). As noted by Rick Porter of the website Zap2it, Sutherland's appearance in "The Falcon and the D'ohman" makes him "one of the relatively few Simpsons guest stars who've appeared more than once and voiced different characters rather than recurring residents of Springfield." Other guest stars to have done this are Albert Brooks, Jon Lovitz, and Phil Hartman, all of whom have played one-time characters and recurring parts. The character Wayne is partly based on Sutherland's 24 character Jack Bauer, who, according to Christopher Hooton of Metro, is also a "po-faced anti-terrorism agent constantly finding his loved ones kidnapped by megalomaniacs." After the episode had aired in the United States, the Ukrainian press reported that the mafioso Viktor bears a resemblance to the Ukrainian President Viktor Yanukovych.

== Release ==
The episode originally aired on the Fox network in the United States on September 25, 2011, as the premiere of the twenty-third season of The Simpsons. It was watched by approximately 8.08 million people during this broadcast. It received a 3.9 Nielsen rating in the demographic for adults aged 18–49 (up three percent from the last season's premiere), and a ten percent share. The Simpsons became the second highest-rated program in the 18–49 demographic in Fox's Animation Domination lineup that night, finishing with a higher rating than The Cleveland Show and American Dad! but a lower rating than Family Guy. The Simpsons was, however, the most-watched show in the lineup in terms of total viewers.

=== Critical reception ===
Since airing, "The Falcon and the D'ohman" has received mixed reviews from critics.

The plot of the episode has been criticized by some reviewers. Kyle Lemmon of Under the Radar gave the episode a three out of ten rating, concluding that "this new episode is rarely grounded in any kind of reality. The best examples of The Simpsons center the situational humor in somewhat plausible scenarios within the town. I guess after so many years, they've completely run out of ideas." Similarly, Television Blend's Jesse Carp wrote that the plot shows "essentially what is wrong with the show and why I stopped watching. Because of the endless amount of material needed to keep a series running for twenty three years, they have to resort to outlandish plots and endless cameos to stay interesting. The best episodes, ... definitely have some absurd elements but they're all firmly grounded in a fairly real world of Springfield, USA and its colorful cast of characters. I'd like to see more of that. I miss them."

The cultural references featured in the episode have attracted both criticism and praise. The parody of Next Media Animation has been commended by several reviewers. Hayden Childs of The A.V. Club commented that the episode "features a couple of quite funny sight gags, like the fresco on Moe's ceiling and the delightful Taiwanese dramatization of certain events", but further wrote that the "rest of the jokes and references clang away without being too funny or too insulting, and that is probably the best that any viewers can ask of The Simpsons in its advanced age." Television Blend's Steve West commented that the episode was the worst of the Animation Domination lineup that week and further elaborated that the cultural references "are always a year behind, and the smart writers who used classic American culture to bring wit to the series have been replaced by those who want to mimic South Park and Family Guy. They fail miserably, and it's gotten so bad that I now no longer care about the relationship between Marge and Homer."

Matt Roush of TV Guide wrote more positively about the episode, noting that "Fox's eternal The Simpsons kicks off a night of all-new animation, welcoming Kiefer Sutherland in a very clever guest role as a security guard trying without much success to escape his violent past. A nod to Taiwanese animation is just one of the highlights in this homage to 24-style mayhem." Similarly, Umika Pidaparthy of CNN's The Marquee Blog commented that "there were a lot of light laughs in this episode, like when Wayne walks through the Ukrainian part of Springfield (Tsarbucks, anyone?). Pop culture references like the Taiwanese animation of the robbery were hilarious. I was disappointed, though, to see that Marge's daydream about being on Top Chef didn't become a side story." Mike Hughes of the Lansing State Journal commented that the episode was "inconsistent, but [had] great moments", and that it was "much better than Fox's other season-openers" that premiered on the same day.
