= Grade School Confidential =

- The Simpsons episode
- Episode no.: Season 8 Episode 19
- Directed by: Susie Dietter
- Written by: Rachel Pulido
- Production code: 4F09
- Original air date: April 6, 1997

Episode features
- Couch gag: The Simpsons are clear blue bubbles that float to the couch and pop one by one.
- Commentary: Matt Groening; Bill Oakley; Josh Weinstein; Rachel Pulido; Susie Dietter

Episode chronology
← Previous "Homer vs. the Eighteenth Amendment"	Next → "The Canine Mutiny"
- The Simpsons season 8

"Grade School Confidential" is the nineteenth episode of the eighth season of the American animated television series The Simpsons. It originally aired on the Fox network in the United States on April 6, 1997. It was written by Rachel Pulido and directed by Susie Dietter. The episode establishes the long-term relationship between Seymour Skinner and Edna Krabappel. Bart witnesses a romantic moment between Principal Skinner and Mrs. Krabappel and acts as a go-between for them. However, they later embarrass him and he exposes their romance to the public.

== Plot ==
Martin Prince invites his classmates to his birthday party, but it ends badly after most of the partygoers get food poisoning and end up leaving by ambulance due to diseased oysters being served instead of cake (including Lisa, who feigns being ill just so she can leave). After the party, Bart, who fed his oysters to the Prince family cat, sees Principal Seymour Skinner and Edna Krabappel kissing in Martin's pink playhouse. After failing to provide Bart with a convincing cover story, Edna and Skinner, fearing that they will be fired if anyone discovers their romance, swear him to secrecy in exchange for putting Milhouse's name on his permanent record.

Edna and Skinner use Bart as their gofer. When Edna and Skinner accidentally run into Superintendent Chalmers while on a date at the cinema, Skinner fetches Bart, who had been sleeping, so that Edna and Skinner could claim that they were supervising a field trip. Bart is humiliated in front of his classmates after Skinner forces him to say "I love you, Edna Krabappel" aloud as if the message were his own, with Martin making further jibes. Fed up, Bart gathers the entire school in front of a janitor's closet and opens the door to reveal that Skinner and Edna are making out.

Word quickly spreads throughout Springfield, with the story the students tell growing more illicit and exaggerated. After hearing his son Ralph's risqué version involving the two "making babies", Chief Wiggum reports it to Chalmers, who gives Skinner an ultimatum: either he ends his relationship with Edna or they both will be fired. Skinner decides that love trumps his professional goals, so Chalmers fires them and demands they leave the building by day's end.

Feeling guilty for costing Edna and Skinner their jobs, Bart encourages them to stand up for themselves. With Bart's help, Skinner and Edna barricade themselves inside the school, contact the media and make their demands: they want their jobs back and the townspeople to stop interfering with their relationship. When several parents protest that their children saw them having sex in the janitor's closet, Skinner insists that is untrue because he is a 44-year-old virgin. The mob is left speechless at the revelation. Chalmers brusquely concedes that it must be true, because nobody in their right mind would lie about something so embarrassing. Realizing that they have overreacted, the residents leave peacefully.

Chalmers agrees to reinstate Skinner and Edna, but asks them to "keep the lewdness at a minimum" during school hours. They thank Bart for helping them, but tell him they are breaking up, fearing the entire town judging their relationship publicly. When a disappointed Bart leaves, they observe grade-school children will believe anything they are told before entering the janitor's closet for another sexual tryst .

== Production ==
The idea of Skinner and Krabappel becoming a couple had been around since the days when Mike Reiss and Al Jean were show runners. The episode's writer Rachel Pulido took some of the inspiration for this episode from "Bart the Lover", specifically Mrs. Krabappel's line to Bart about refusing to date Principal Skinner because, "his mommy won't let him out to play". The Mathmagician is based on Bill Gates. The cakes in Agnes Skinner's cake book were designed to accurately resemble the real life versions of them. Homer using his megaphone to talk to Marge and Lisa, who were standing next to him, was ad-libbed by Dan Castellaneta. A deleted scene featured an awkward moment at Martin's party, between Bart, Milhouse and Martin, when the latter introduces the two to his parents. This episode marks the only episode in Season 8 in which Marge has a minor role, and one of the four times Lisa has a minor role in a Season 8 episode, the others being "Bart After Dark", "Homer's Enemy", and "The Simpsons Spin-Off Showcase", although she has major or supporting roles in the season's other episodes.

== Cultural references ==
The title is a reference to High School Confidential! Mrs. Krabappel has a candle that resembles Charlie Brown, a character from the Peanuts comic strip by Charles M. Schulz. At the Aztec theater, a movie with actor Tom Berenger was played. It is implied by Superintendent Chalmers' comment "You think they actually filmed this in Atlanta?" and from the commentary that the movie is The Big Chill. In trying to force Edna and Seymour out of the school, the Springfield police attempts to flood the area with music. This is similar to a tactic that the US troops used during Operation Just Cause in an attempt to force Manuel Noriega out of the Vatican embassy in Panama City. However, in this case, romance-themed music was played, which was "Embraceable You" by George Gershwin and Ira Gershwin. Edna and Seymour's dance poses were taken from Orlando Baeza, who was the assistant director for this episode.

== Reception ==
In its original broadcast, "Grade School Confidential" finished 57th in ratings for the week of March 31 - April 6, 1997, with a Nielsen rating of 7.7, equivalent to approximately 7.5 million viewing households. It was the fifth highest-rated show on the Fox network that week, following The X-Files, Party of Five, Beverly Hills, 90210 and Melrose Place.

The authors of the book I Can't Believe It's a Bigger and Better Updated Unofficial Simpsons Guide, Gary Russell and Gareth Roberts, called it "A delightful episode that finally brings to fruition one of the series' longest running gags: Edna and Seymour's mutual attraction. What is doubly refreshing is that it remains a constant in the subsequent episodes." The scene in which Agnes Skinner shows Bart her cake book is one of Matt Groening's all-time favorite scenes.
