= Diary Queen =

- The Simpsons episode
- Episode no.: Season 32; Episode 12
- Directed by: Matthew Nastuk
- Written by: Jeff Westbrook
- Production code: QABF05
- Original air date: February 21, 2021

Guest appearances
- Joe Mantegna as Fat Tony; Marcia Wallace as Edna Krabappel (archive recordings); Mario Jose as Julio's singing voice

Episode features
- Chalkboard gag: "I will never be a teacher's pet" is seen before the closing credits.
- Couch gag: The couch is on Mars and gets crushed by a spaceship. Marge and Maggie come out of the spaceship, while the rest of the family come on foot, hover bike and skateboard. However, Homer doesn't have his space helmet on; Marge asks where it is, and Homer's head explodes.

Episode chronology
← Previous "The Dad-Feelings Limited"	Next → "Wad Goals"
- The Simpsons season 32

"Diary Queen" is the twelfth episode of the thirty-second season of the American animated television series The Simpsons and the 696th episode overall. It aired in the United States on Fox on February 21, 2021. The episode was directed by Matthew Nastuk and written by Jeff Westbrook.

In this episode, Bart finds his former teacher's diary and believes that she thought he was her most improved student. The episode received positive reviews.

== Plot ==
When Ned Flanders holds a yard sale, Bart and Milhouse buy several books as part of a scheme to record a stunt. When that backfires, the boys discover their late teacher Edna Krabappel's old diary among the books. They then escape Fat Tony and his mob and prank the school staff.

Despite Milhouse repeatedly urging him not to invade Edna's privacy, Bart heads to his treehouse and starts reading the diary, discovering a page where Edna had written that she thought Bart had potential in succeeding in school. Convinced that he is the most improved student, Bart starts doing well in school. After Bart passes a test, the family celebrates with a cake, but Marge and Lisa look around his room, suspecting him of cheating. With the help of Maggie, Lisa finds the diary at the treehouse and discovers that Edna was actually referring to her pet cat. Lisa hides this from Bart, which soon stresses her out. When Bart decides to enter the school spelling bee, Lisa reveals the truth, causing a depressed Bart to hide in his treehouse alone.

Later in the treehouse, Ned reveals to Bart that his family had considered leaving Springfield, but were stopped by Edna, who believed she needed to stay, as children like Bart needed her. Realizing that Edna truly did care for him, Bart returns the diary to Ned. At home, Ned reads the diary and is brought to tears over an entry where Edna says that being married to him made her dreams come true.

The episode ends with a montage of Edna's moments throughout the series.

== Production ==
=== Casting ===
The late Marcia Wallace guest-stars as Edna Krabappel through archive recordings. Her estate cleared her appearance and was compensated for it. The show did not give a farewell to Wallace's character at the time of her death because producers were not aware she was ill, so this episode was an attempt to memorialize her. The producers also decided not to reveal how Edna died.

This is the final episode in which actor Harry Shearer voices the black character of Dr. Hibbert. Beginning with the following episode "Wad Goals", he is voiced by Kevin Michael Richardson, who is African-American. In addition, Julio had his voice provided by Mario Jose in this episode.

Joe Mantegna appears as Fat Tony.

=== Release ===
The episode was scheduled to debut on January 10, 2021, but was rescheduled to February 14 due to being preempted by the NFL playoffs. Rain delays at the 2021 Daytona 500 further delayed all prime time shows scheduled for broadcast to February 21.

== Reception ==
=== Viewing figures ===
In the United States, the episode was watched live by 1.43 million viewers.

=== Critical response ===
Tony Sokol with Den of Geek, said "This is a different kind of arc for The Simpsons. 'Diary Queen' is on an uplifting trajectory until Lisa knocks it off course, and ends in a sudden life-affirming crash. Bart’s final warning to Marge, 'I'll go over the edge if you try to make me feel better,' is wonderfully skewered, but the final twist is a dose of treacle. The episode was originally slated to premiere on Valentine’s Day, and is a sweet sendoff." He also gave the episode four out of five stars.

Jesse Bereta of Bubbleblabber gave the episode a 7.5 out of 10. He thought the episode was a respectful way to honor Marcia Wallace. He stated that the closure that Bart receives was the most heartwarming part of the episode.
