= The Man Who Grew Too Much =

- The Simpsons episode
- Episode no.: Season 25; Episode 13
- Directed by: Matthew Schofield
- Written by: Jeff Westbrook
- Production code: SABF07
- Original air date: March 9, 2014

Guest appearances
- Kelsey Grammer as Sideshow Bob; Marcia Wallace as Edna Krabappel

Episode features
- Couch gag: Earth's single large land mass breaks apart into five Simpsons-shaped continents, only for a Moe-shaped asteroid to destroy the planet.

Episode chronology
| ← Previous "Diggs" | Next → "The Winter of His Content" |
- The Simpsons season 25

"The Man Who Grew Too Much" is the thirteenth episode of the twenty-fifth season of the American animated television series The Simpsons and the 543rd episode of the series. It premiered on the Fox network in the United States on March 9, 2014. It was written by Jeff Westbrook and directed by Matthew Schofield.

In the episode, Lisa discovers that Sideshow Bob has become the chief scientist of a massive chemical engineering company, but the two of them bond over their appreciation for high culture. Meanwhile, Marge ends up a church volunteer to help teenagers become abstinent. The episode serves as a stand-alone sequel to "The Bob Next Door". Kelsey Grammer and Marcia Wallace guest starred. The episode received positive reviews.

== Plot ==
As Ms. Hoover's class watches a film that Lisa feels does not fit in the lesson plan, they are interrupted by students stampeding in the hallways because it is Taco Tuesday. Homer and his co-workers sneak into the school to take advantage of this day. Lisa observes Bart eating his sixth taco and the lunch lady retaining the salad for another meal. After Lisa questions whether the vegetables will rot or not, the lunch lady tells her that the veggies are genetically modified, so they will last. After reading about the side effects of eating genetically modified foods, Lisa presents her argument at the parent-teacher meeting at school. After watching a confusing video, Lisa runs off to do more research and discovers genetically modified foods can actually be a good thing, much to the surprise of her audience. A corporation takes interest in Lisa's initiative to drive genetically modified foods home, and introduces Lisa and her family to their chief scientist, which turns out to be Sideshow Bob. Bob recounts how he, driven by insanity in prison, became a test subject so that the monkeys would not be injured too much. Lisa connects with Bob through their mutual love of Walt Whitman, and Bob notes that Lisa was always the best family member out of the Simpson clan. The two begin to do scientific food experiments together, and find they enjoy each other's company.

Meanwhile, Marge rushes to get to the church before the volunteer sign-up positions she wants are gone but it is too late, as Marge gets suckered by Ned into giving the sex talk to teenagers. It is no use when the teenagers mock her teaching, and she fails miserably to get her point across about sex, even with her attempt at finger puppets. At home, Homer tries to squeeze in some alone time with an angry Marge, who decides to use him as an example for her sex education class. Marge brings Homer to church to tell her class that she has abstained from sex with her partner for two days. The mere image of Homer and Marge touching each other gives the teenagers enough reason to pledge to wait until marriage for sex, though this results in them starting a riot in pent-up sexual frustration.

Despite having to carry his concrete ankle block from prison, Bob enjoys his time with Lisa at the museum. While passing through an exhibit, a heavy display model comes close to squashing Lisa, but Bob saves her. As Lisa wants to know how Bob had the strength to do so, Bob reveals to Lisa that with the success of genetically modified foods, he has been able to change his own DNA. Bob also tells Lisa that the real reason behind their trip to the museum is because of his plans on using the DNA of the geniuses in the exhibit to become the smartest of them all. When Bart comes to save Lisa, Bob warns he can be tempted into a murderous rage very easily. After a family bothers him for a minute, he does go into a rage and goes after Bart and Lisa with his new "grasshopper" thighs and "killer whale" sonar. He chases them to the edge of the Springfield Dam, but Marge, Homer and the teen-abstinence group come to stop him with Marge promising to release the teens from their pledge. When Lisa quotes Walt Whitman, Bob realizes he has become a monster and attempts suicide by drowning, but then remembers he gave himself gills.

In an epilogue (done as a tribute to Marcia Wallace), Ned recalls how much he loved Edna, as he and Nelson mourn her death.

== Production ==
This episode marked the final appearance of Marcia Wallace as Edna Krabappel. Executive producer Al Jean stated that there were only two lines recorded by Wallace remaining, and there was not enough material for a farewell episode. The character would be retired out of respect for Wallace.

== Cultural references ==
The Monsarno company is a parody of Monsanto.

== Reception ==
=== Viewing figures ===
The episode received a 1.6 rating and was watched by a total of 3.75 million people, making it the second most watched show on Animation Domination that night.

=== Critical response ===
The episode received positive reviews from critics. The A.V. Club gave the episode a B+ rating and praised Kelsey Grammer's voice-acting and the episode's "strong, straightforward narrative." They summed up,

"But the greatest reward of any Sideshow Bob episode is Kelsey Grammer who, some 24 years after his first appearance as the fright-wigged, intermittently homicidal, incongruously cultured Robert Underdunk [sic] Terwilliger, can make the character as vitally funny and menacing as ever. In a career of stunning highs and ignominious lows, Sideshow Bob lives on as a creation as indelible as Frasier Crane. Essentially, Bob’s machinations bump this episode up an entire grade."

Teresa Lopez of TV Fanatic gave a mixed-to-positive review. Although lauding Sideshow Bob and Lisa's bonding over their I.Qs and describing it as "heartwarming", Lopez criticized Bob's scheme as "mundane" and Bob's devolution "into an out of control genetic monster...was silly even for him." Praise was given, however, to the episode's B-story involving Marge trying to talk to the local teens about celibacy as "her uncomfortable speaking and inadvertently titillating finger puppets made for some great comic moments." The episode ultimately received a 3.6/5 star rating.

=== Monsanto response ===
After the episode aired, Monsanto released a statement saying, "We are glad Lisa did her homework and came to her own conclusions about the facts and benefits of GMOs."
