= Bringing In the Sheaves =

American Gospel song

Bringing in the Sheaves
- by Knowles Shaw
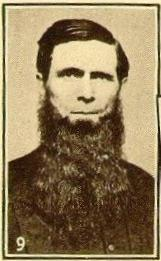
- Hymn writer Knowles Shaw
- Genre: Hymn
- Written: 1874
- Based on: Psalm 126:6
- Meter: 12.11.12.11 with refrain

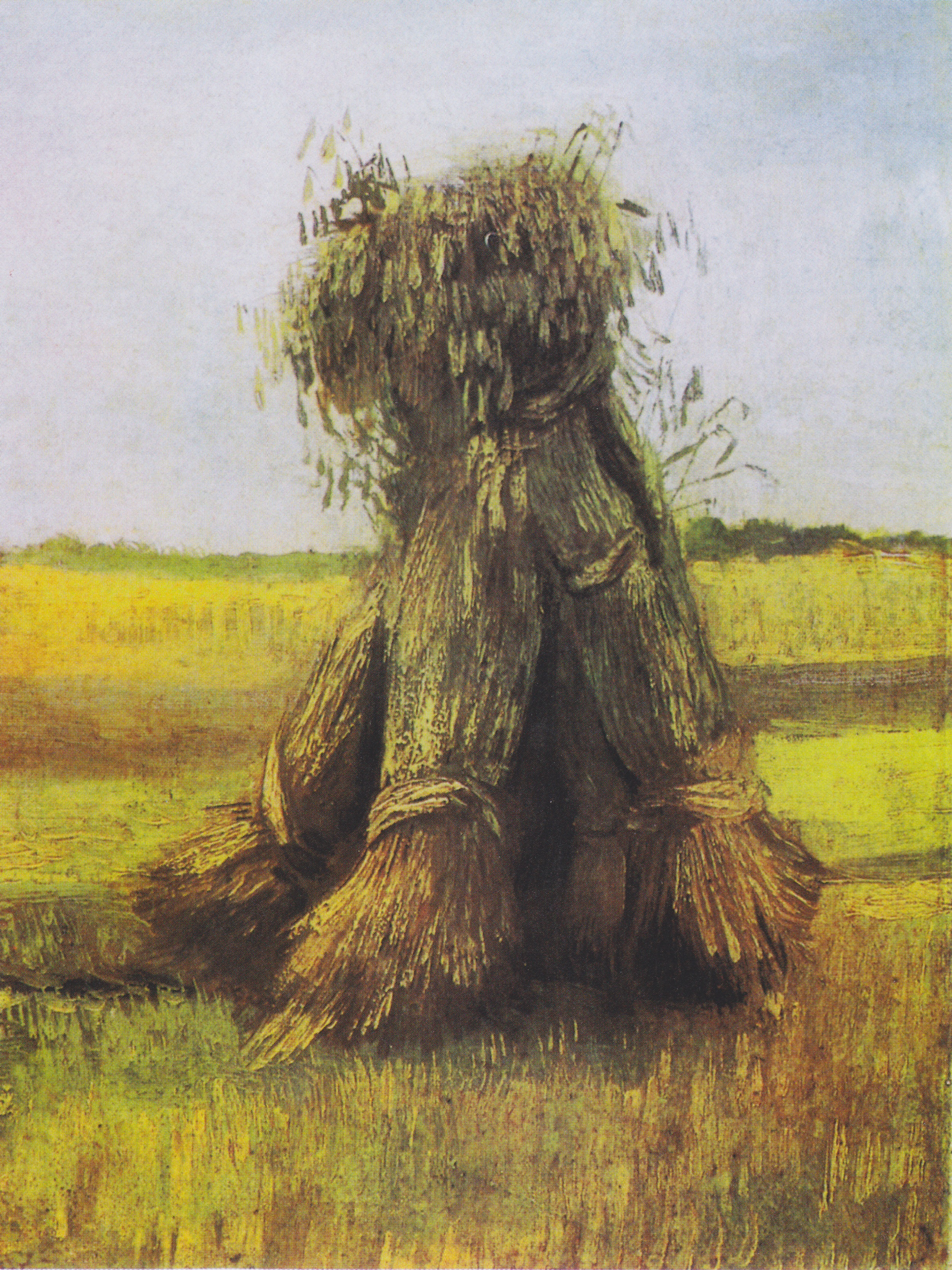
Wheatsheaves in a Field (1885) by Vincent van Gogh

"Bringing in the Sheaves" is a popular American Gospel song used almost exclusively by Protestant Christians (though the content is not specifically Protestant in nature). The lyrics were written in 1874 by Knowles Shaw, who was inspired by Psalm 126:6, "He that goeth forth and weepeth, bearing precious seed, shall doubtless come again with rejoicing, bringing his sheaves with him." Shaw also wrote music for these words, but they are now usually set to a tune by George Minor, written in 1880.

== Lyrics ==
Sowing in the morning, sowing seeds of kindness,
Sowing in the noontide and the dewy eve;
Waiting for the harvest, and the time of reaping,
We shall come rejoicing, bringing in the sheaves.

Refrain:
Bringing in the sheaves, bringing in the sheaves,
We shall come rejoicing, bringing in the sheaves,
Bringing in the sheaves, bringing in the sheaves,
We shall come rejoicing, bringing in the sheaves.

Sowing in the sunshine, sowing in the shadows,
Fearing neither clouds nor winter's chilling breeze;
By and by the harvest, and the labor ended,
We shall come rejoicing, bringing in the sheaves.

Refrain

Going forth with weeping, sowing for the Master,
Though the loss sustained our spirit often grieves;
When our weeping's over, He will bid us welcome,
We shall come rejoicing, bringing in the sheaves.

Refrain

== In popular culture ==
- The hymn's refrain was sung in the 1933 movie Tillie and Gus starring W.C. Fields.
- The hymn was sung in the 1938 movie Of Human Hearts starring Walter Huston.
- The hymn was sung in the 1941 movie Belle Starr (1941 film) starring Gene Tierney.
- The hymn was sung in the 1948 movie 3 Godfathers starring John Wayne.
- The hymn was sung in the 1952 movie Ma and Pa Kettle at the Fair.
- The hymn was sung in the 1955 movie The Night of the Hunter starring Robert Mitchum.
- The hymn's refrain was sung in the 1968 movie Bandolero! starring James Stewart.
- Charles Ives used fragments of this and other 19th-century American secular and spiritual songs in his 2nd Symphony.
- In the 1966 film Batman, this song is played by a marching band as Batman tries to dispose of a bomb.
- The hymn was sung in 23rd episode of the TV show The Girl From U.N.C.L.E (1967)
- The hymn's refrain was sung in several episodes of the TV show Little House on the Prairie.
- The hymn was sung in the 1986 movie The Texas Chainsaw Massacre 2 starring Dennis Hopper
- The hymn's refrain has been included in a number of episodes of The Simpsons:
  - It was sung by Rod and Todd Flanders in the 1992 episode Bart the Lover.
  - It was whistled by Ned Flanders in the 1994 episode Homer Loves Flanders, and partially sung in the 1995 episode The Springfield Connection.
  - It was also sung by Reverend Lovejoy in the 1994 episode Bart's Girlfriend.
  - The 2004 episode Sleeping with the Enemy had a song called “Planing Down the Thighs” set to the chorus.
- The hymn's refrain was sung in the first episode of the 2020 miniseries The Queen's Gambit.
- The hymn's refrain was sung at church in the 2014 episode of the TV show Two and a Half Men titled "Miss Pasternak"
- In the film Final Destination 5 the coroner John Bloodworth whistles the hymn's refrain
