= The War of Art (The Simpsons) =

- The Simpsons episode
- Episode no.: Season 25; Episode 15
- Directed by: Steven Dean Moore
- Written by: Rob LaZebnik
- Production code: SABF10
- Original air date: March 23, 2014

Guest appearance
- Max von Sydow as Klaus Ziegler

Episode chronology
← Previous "The Winter of His Content"	Next → "You Don't Have to Live Like a Referee"
- The Simpsons season 25

"The War of Art" is the fifteenth episode of the twenty-fifth season of the American animated television series The Simpsons and the 545th episode of the series. It first aired on the Fox network in the United States on March 23, 2014. It was written by Rob LaZebnik and directed by Steven Dean Moore.

In this episode, Marge buys a painting from the Van Houtens' yard sale, but when they learn it is valuable, the Simpsons and Van Houtens fight over ownership. Max von Sydow guest starred as Klaus Ziegler. The episode was met with generally positive reviews, and was met with much critical analysis over the episode's themes. Upon airing, the episode was watched by 3.98 million American viewers.

== Plot ==
After Lisa's new pet guinea pig destroys the Simpsons' living room art, Marge falls in love with a beautiful painting at the Van Houtens' yard sale, which Homer purchases for $20. Marge removes the frame and finds that the painting bears the signature of Johan Oldenveldt, an artist of some renown. An art appraiser estimates that it could bring between $80,000 and $100,000 at auction. Marge wants to share the sale proceeds with the Van Houtens, but Homer disagrees, saying that the Simpsons should look after their own financial security first and keep the sale a secret from them. Milhouse eavesdrops on the conversation from Bart's treehouse and tells his parents. The Van Houtens publicly shame the Simpsons for their secrecy, prompting a town-wide division of opinion.

As the auction begins, Dawn, a former lover of Kirk's, arrives and claims that he took the painting from her. The auction is suspended until its ownership can be established. Kirk tells Homer that he bought the painting on the island of Isla Verde, Puerto Rico, home to an artists' community. Homer and Lisa travel to the café at which Kirk made the purchase in order to corroborate Kirk's account and the legality of Homer's purchase. The café owner confirms that she sold the painting to Kirk, but as Homer starts to celebrate, one of the customers interrupts. This man is Klaus Ziegler, an art forger who created the painting; he has fooled art galleries around the world by flawlessly imitating other painters' techniques. Although Lisa objects to Ziegler's practices, he convinces her that his forgeries have brought pleasure to the people who see them. Homer pays him to create three new paintings: a family portrait for the Van Houtens, a new sailboat picture for the Simpsons' living room, and a garish picture of a jukebox for Homer.

The episode ends with a brief documentary (narrated by Ziegler) on the history of Strupo, a foul-smelling, hallucinogenic, highly addictive alcoholic beverage brewed on Isla Verde.

== Analysis ==
The episode centers around the theme of the intrinsic value of art and the issue of art forgeries. It also questions the notion of ownership over a "worthless" product that was bought off a friend, which is subsequently deemed worthy; is one required to split the money with the original owners? Tony Sokol of Den of Geek noted that the episode brings out the "beauty of forgery". The article pondered this: "What is ownership? What is commerce? What is art? Art is a mirror held up to reflect reality, and no mirror has been made large enough, so all art is forgery", and then referred to Homer's subjective conditions for great art: nudity, holograms and horrible things happening to Jesus. Another art-related quote from the episode that the article mentions is Homer's "Everyone can have their own opinion about why it sucks". The episode offers no easy answers and instead is open to interpretation and invites all opinions without force-feeding any one in particular. Teresa Lopez of TV Fanatic noted that "It's easy to see how the painting easily divides the entire town of Springfield. We can certainly understand both sides of the debate."

David Ng of the Los Angeles Times argued that the episode "echoed a number of real-life art stories, including the case of Wolfgang Beltracchi, the convicted German art forger who was recently profiled on "60 Minutes," as well as the case of a Pierre-Auguste Renoir landscape painting that was purchased at a flea market for $7". Dennis Perkins of The A.V. Club noted that "Homer doesn't need to understand the nature of art here. He needs to realize that being a selfish jerk is, well, selfish and jerky", though added that he does commission paintings to help save Luann and Kirk's marriage and to replace the Simpson boat painting. Den of Geek's Tony Sokol argued that the value of art is something that has a common thread throughout The Simpsons. Marge is a painter, and in one episode she paints a naked picture of Mr Burns, and he said "he knew what he hated in art and he didn’t hate what she created, in spite of the embarrassment it caused him". As her painting communicated emotions despite its ugliness, Sokol argued "it makes perfect sense that Marge would appreciate the artistry of the forgery and still appreciate the simple boat painting she might have gotten in a supermarket". It also refers to Lisa's love of the arts (including jazz and poetry), and says "even El Barto was a great graffiti artiste".

== Cultural references ==
=== Richard Branson space flight "prediction" ===
Following Richard Branson's 2021 Virgin Galactic space flight, it was noted that the episode depicted Branson flying in space seven years beforehand.

== Reception ==
=== Critical response ===
Dennis Perkins of The A.V. Club gave the episode a B, saying "The War Of Art’ is like early Simpsons on an off day—pleasantly forgettable. Except that if the old show had a bad week, it was a safe bet that the next episode would be better. Now there’s the disheartening sense that an episode of quiet competence without any major missteps will have to suffice." He added that despite one of a number of criticisms of recent Simpsons being "the cast’s perceived disinterest", in this episode it was clear Smith was giving 100% to Lisa in her obsession over the guinea pigs.

Tony Sokol of Den of Geek gave the episode 4 stars out of 5, and wrote "I’ve said before and will say again that The Simpsons towers over all current TV sitcoms. That the worst episode of The Simpsons will still have more laughs per minute than the best episode of, say Modern Family...The Simpsons usually pour on the jokes. This particular episode, while still crammed with bits, is more like A Night At The Opera than Monkey Business. They use less actual larfs, bits for an overall finer quality of comedy."

Teresa Lopez of TV Fanatic gave the episode two out of five stars, saying "Although The Simpsons Season 25 Episode 15 was a clearly focused and insightful look at the ways money can ruin relationships, it lacked the necessary humor to balance out the heavy-handed lessons."

=== Viewing figures ===
The episode received a 1.9 rating and was watched by a total of 3.98 million people, making it the second most watched show on Animation Domination that night.

=== Awards and nominations ===
Writer Rob LaZebnik was nominated for the Annie Award for Outstanding Achievement for Writing in an Animated Television/Broadcast Production at the 42nd Annie Awards for this episode.
