= A Case of Spring Fever =

- Full film
- Directed by: James Tyer; Frank Goldman
- Produced by: Jamison Handy
- Starring: Pinto Colvig; Edward J. Nugent
- Production company: Jam Handy Organization
- Release date: 1940
- Running time: 8:15
- Country: United States
- Language: English

A Case of Spring Fever is a 1940 American short industrial film produced by the Jam Handy Organization for Chevrolet. The black-and-white film is partially animated, partially live-action. It follows the story of Gilbert, a man whose wish that he never sees a spring again is granted by Coily the Spring Sprite, who makes springs vanish.

== Plot ==
Gilbert's wife phones his golfing buddies to tell them that he won't be able to join them today, as he is stuck at home repairing the springs in his couch. Frustrated, Gilbert fumes that he never wants to see another spring "as long as I live," prompting the appearance of Coily, a "spring sprite." Coily brusquely grants Gilbert's wish, and removes all springs from his life. Initially relieved at no longer having to fix the couch, Gilbert quickly finds that he is unable to use most of the devices in his home, including his pocket watch, window blinds, rotary phone, and even his car, all of which rely on springs for their functionality. Every time Gilbert attempts to use a spring-based device, Coily taunts him with the phrase, "No springs!" Gilbert begs Coily to let him retract his wish, which Coily does, on the condition that Gilbert never wish away springs again.

Gilbert joins his friends at the golf course, talking endlessly about the benefits of springs. He astutely explains the mechanics of a spring and provides various examples of devices, processes, and physical reactions for which springs are necessary. Gilbert's friends become bored, then irritated, at his pontificating. At length, Gilbert is forced to stop one of the men from making the same anti-spring wish that he once made, and Coily briefly reappears to laugh.

== Analysis ==
The English studies academic Donald Levin argues that, though a documentary, A Case of Spring Fever eschews some features typical of the genre, instead dramatizing its events and introducing a supernatural character. It also has a parodic or mockumentary character; Gilbert is a comic figure who is infantilized by his wife and subsequently bores his friends. Nonetheless, Gilbert's claims about springs are presented as factual. For Levin, "the film's use of the codes and conventions of the documentary work to increase our understanding about our shared social world, and at the same time critique and parody Gilbert's (and, by extension, its own) attempt to communicate that understanding".

== Legacy ==
A Case of Spring Fever was parodied in "Bart the Lover", a third season episode of The Simpsons, in which an educational film about zinc includes a supernatural being who makes all zinc disappear.

The short was parodied on season 3, episode 17 of Mystery Science Theater 3000, with the cast later reflecting that the reference would be unclear to most viewers. It was subjected to more sustained mockery in the penultimate episode of the original run of the show (season 10, episode 12) alongside the 1976 horror film Squirm. Chris Morgan called the short film "a worthy choice for the final short [featured on Mystery Science Theater 3000], a strange film with an even stranger premise". RiffTrax, a spiritual successor to Mystery Science Theater 3000, lampooned A Case of Spring Fever in 2014.

A Case of Spring Fever was also parodied as Zinc Oxide and You in The Kentucky Fried Movie. The skit features the successive disappearance of objects containing zinc oxide, with more and more disastrous results.
