= The Winter of His Content =

- The Simpsons episode
- Episode no.: Season 25; Episode 14
- Directed by: Chuck Sheetz
- Written by: Kevin Curran
- Production code: SABF09
- Original air date: March 16, 2014

Guest appearance
- Kevin Michael Richardson as S.A.T. Preppers Member

Episode features
- Chalkboard gag: "My dad's already drunk for St. Patrick's"
- Couch gag: Homer is the patient from the board game Operation with other characters as the pieces (Lisa is "Brainy" (the brain), and Moe is "Elbow Bender" (the elbow)). When "Pain in the Butt" Bart is removed, he grabs the forceps and sticks it on the side, which causes Homer to buzz and scream in pain.

Episode chronology
| ← Previous "The Man Who Grew Too Much" | Next → "The War of Art" |
- The Simpsons season 25

"The Winter of His Content" is the fourteenth episode of the twenty-fifth season of the American animated television series The Simpsons and the 544th episode of the series. It first aired on the Fox network in the United States on March 16, 2014. It was written by Kevin Curran and directed by Chuck Sheetz.

In the episode, when the Retirement Castle is closed for health violations, Marge invites Grampa and two other old people to live at the Simpsons' house, only to get frustrated with Homer embracing the "old person lifestyle". Meanwhile, Bart defends Nelson's decision to wear his mother's underwear, and ends up part of a bully gathering in an homage to the 1979 action film The Warriors. The episode received negative reviews.

== Plot ==
Marge and Homer arrive home from a date when Lisa tells them the Springfield Retirement Castle has been shut down for massive violations, and Grampa has nowhere to live. When Grampa is picked up by the family, Marge sees that Jasper and the Old Jewish Man have no one, so she invites them to stay with them.

With Grampa and his friends annoying Homer, Lisa says she and Bart are getting cues on how they will take care of Homer when he is older. She asks her dad to be nice to Grampa, whom she calls a "treasure". Homer's efforts to be nice leads to him surprisingly enjoying the senior citizen lifestyle, and they induct Homer into their club. Unfortunately, Homer's appreciation for all things elderly irritates Marge, and she tells Patty and Selma that while she did not mind when he got bald and fat, she never expected him to act older than her.

At school, Bart and his classmates undress for gym class. Nelson changes, but his classmates laugh at him when they see he is wearing his mother's underwear. Bart says he is wearing Homer's hand-me-down briefs. The class is moved by Bart's kind act. To thank him, Nelson, Dolph, Kearney, and Jimbo induct Bart into their ranks.

The group goes to a meeting at the Bully Summit held by Chester, the leader of all bullies. They are required to turn in their weapons, but Bart forgets to turn in his slingshot. When a more rebellious bully uses Bart's slingshot during Chester's speech, he blames Bart, who with Nelson, Dolph, Kearney, and Jimbo, try to return to Springfield without getting beaten or killed by all the enraged bullies. The five make it to the subway, but the Baseball Furries are waiting. Bart uses his slingshot to break the street light and distract them. One stays behind, and Nelson sacrifices himself to allow the others to escape.

As the sun is rising, the four make it back to the Springfield beach, where Homer and the old men are taking a stroll. Homer sees his son is in trouble and wants his friends to help, but they demur in cowardly fashion. Homer confronts the enemy bully and punches him. The bully begins crying and runs off with his allies while Bart, Homer, and their crews walk back home. That night, Homer returns to normal and has sex with Marge.

== Cultural references ==
The bully summit is a parody of the 1979 film The Warriors. The song "In the City" by Joe Walsh, which appears on the film's soundtrack, plays over the episode's end credits. The Itchy & Scratchy Show cartoon is a parody of Downton Abbey.

== Reception ==
Dennis Perkins of The A.V. Club gave the episode a C, stating "’The Winter Of His Content’ is the quintessential Simpsons episode for those seeking to argue the series’ late-run inconsequence. While there’s nothing less insightful than saying the show isn’t what it used to be, episodes like this are nothing but fuel for the argument—indifferent, lukewarm fuel."

Tony Sokol of Den of Geek gave the episode 2.5 out of 5 stars. He stated that although there were some laughs, the episode was a bit tired.

The episode received a 1.9 rating and was watched by a total of 4.02 million people, making it the second most watched show on Animation Domination that night.
