= Symphony No. 2 (Ives) =

Symphonic composition by Charles Ives

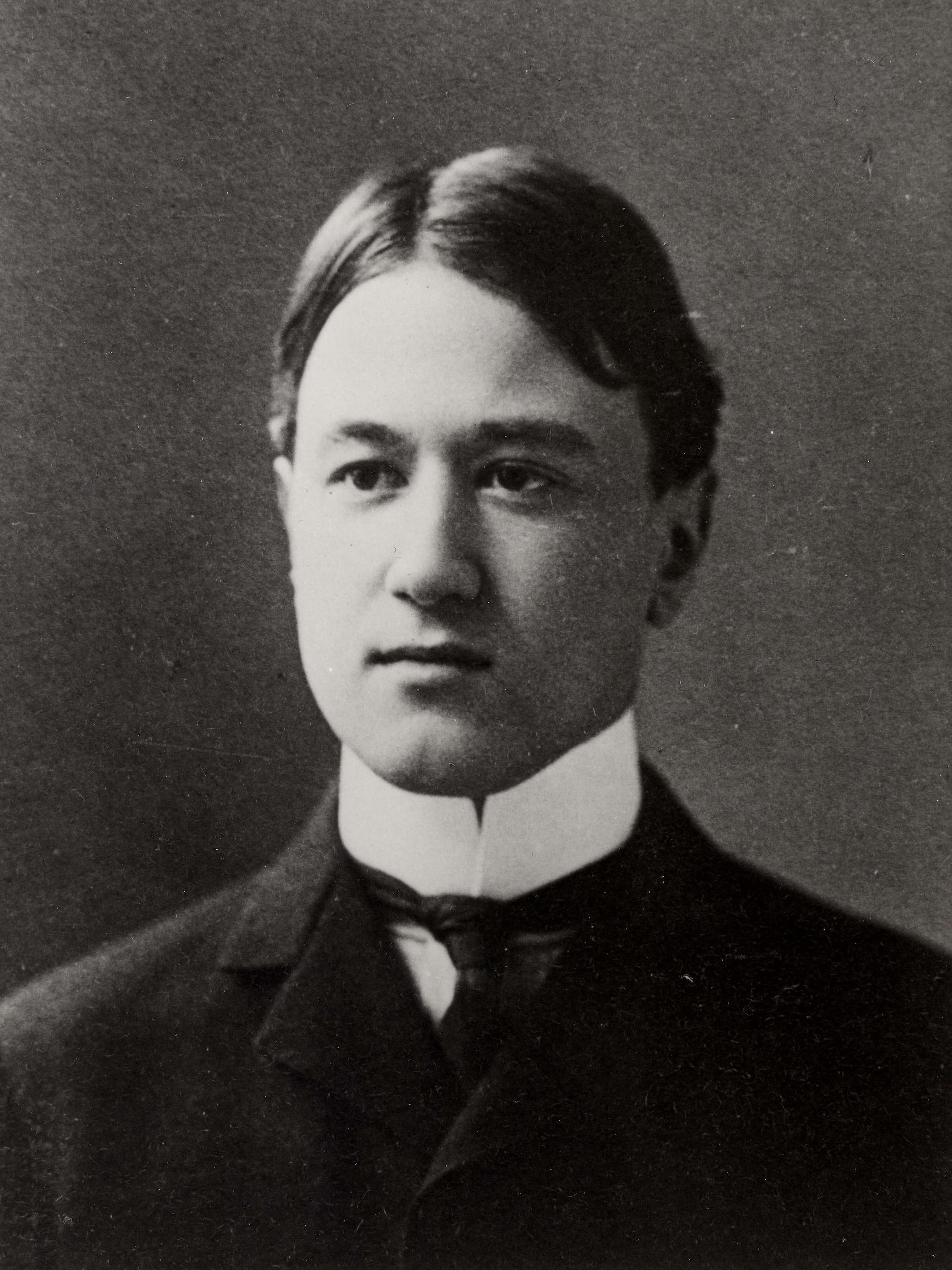
Charles Ives's graduation portrait from Yale University, c. June 1898

The Second Symphony was written by Charles Ives between 1897 and 1902. The symphony consists of five movements and lasts approximately 40 minutes.

== Music ==
The piece is scored for piccolo, two flutes, two oboes, two clarinets, two bassoons, contrabassoon, four horns, two trumpets, three trombones, tuba, timpani, triangle, snare drum, bass drum and strings.

The five movements are:

1. Andante moderato
2. Allegro
3. Adagio cantabile
4. Lento maestoso
5. Allegro molto vivace

The piece departs from the conventional four-movement symphonic structure by the insertion of a slow Lento maestoso movement as an introduction to the Allegro molto vivace.

== History and analysis ==
Although the work was composed during Ives's twenties, it was half a century before it was premiered, on February 22, 1951, in a New York Philharmonic concert conducted by Leonard Bernstein. The symphony was premiered to rapturous applause. Ives did not attend the concert in person, but listened to a radio rebroadcast on March 4 at a neighbor's house. When the broadcast ended, he left the room without comment, leaving those present uncertain whether he was too moved or too overwhelmed to speak. The public performance had been postponed for so long because Ives had been alienated from the American classical establishment. Ever since his training with Horatio Parker at Yale, this establishment had disapproved of Ives for the mischievous unorthodoxy with which he pushed the boundaries of European classical structures to create soundscapes that recalled the vernacular music-making of his New England upbringing.

Like Ives's other compositions that honor the European and American inheritances, the Second Symphony makes no complete quotation of popular American tunes, but tunes such as "Camptown Races", "Bringing In the Sheaves", "Long, Long Ago", "Turkey in the Straw" and "America the Beautiful", are alluded to and reshaped into original themes. The sole exception is "Columbia, the Gem of the Ocean", whose verse is heard complete and almost unaltered at the climax of the fifth movement as a counterpoint to Ives's original first theme. There are also a number of references to works from the Western canon of music, notably the first movement of Beethoven’s Symphony No. 5 (some rather subdued compared with the original) and a rescoring of part of Brahms’ Symphony No. 1, as well as a passage (in the first and last movements) from the F minor three-part invention of Johann Sebastian Bach. Ives also quotes the so-called Longing for Death motif from Wagner's opera Tristan und Isolde.

Bernstein's premiere and subsequent interpretations were later widely criticized for taking liberties with the score. The score used in 1951 contained about a thousand errors, but in addition Bernstein made a substantial cut to the finale, ignored some of Ives's tempo indications, changed instrumentation, and prolonged the terminating "Bronx cheer" discord from an eighth note to more than a half note. Many conductors and audiences, influenced by Bernstein's example, have considered the last of these practices one of the trademarks of the piece. In 2000, the Charles Ives Society prepared an official critical edition of the score and authorized a recording by Kenneth Schermerhorn and the Nashville Symphony Orchestra to adhere more closely to Ives's intentions.

== Recordings ==
Although the world premiere performance was later issued on CD, the first studio recording was made by F. Charles Adler with the Vienna Philharmonia Orchestra in February 1953. Leonard Bernstein and the New York Philharmonic recorded the work in stereo and mono versions for Columbia Records on October 6, 1958. Eugene Ormandy and the Philadelphia Orchestra recorded the symphony for RCA Victor on February 7, 1973, in a multi-channel version later issued on CD with Dolby Surround Sound encoding. Bernard Herrmann, another long-time champion of Ives's music, recorded the work with the London Symphony Orchestra in Decca/London's 'Phase 4 Stereo' on January 4, 1972. He had given the UK premiere of Ives's 2nd Symphony in a BBC radio broadcast with the same orchestra on April 25, 1956, a historic performance that has now been released on CD by Pristine Audio. Also of note is the 1998 recording Stephen Somary conducted with the Nürnberg Symphony Orchestra, released by Claves Records.
