= Knowles Shaw =

American author and composer (1834–1878)

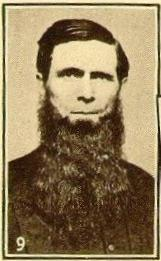
Knowles Shaw

Knowles Shaw (October 13, 1834 – June 7, 1878) was an American writer and composer of gospel hymns.

== Biography ==
Shaw was born in Butler County in southwestern Ohio. His family moved to Rushville, Indiana when he was just a few weeks old. He was a member of the churches of Christ, also known as the Christian Church or Disciples of Christ at the time.

His best known work is the popular gospel song "Bringing in the Sheaves" (words). He also wrote "Tarry with Me" and a tune used with "We Saw Thee Not" among many other works.

Shaw was a prolific evangelist, known for his wit, knowledge of the Bible, and ability to generate and maintain rapport with an audience. He baptized over eleven thousand people in his ministry.

== Death ==
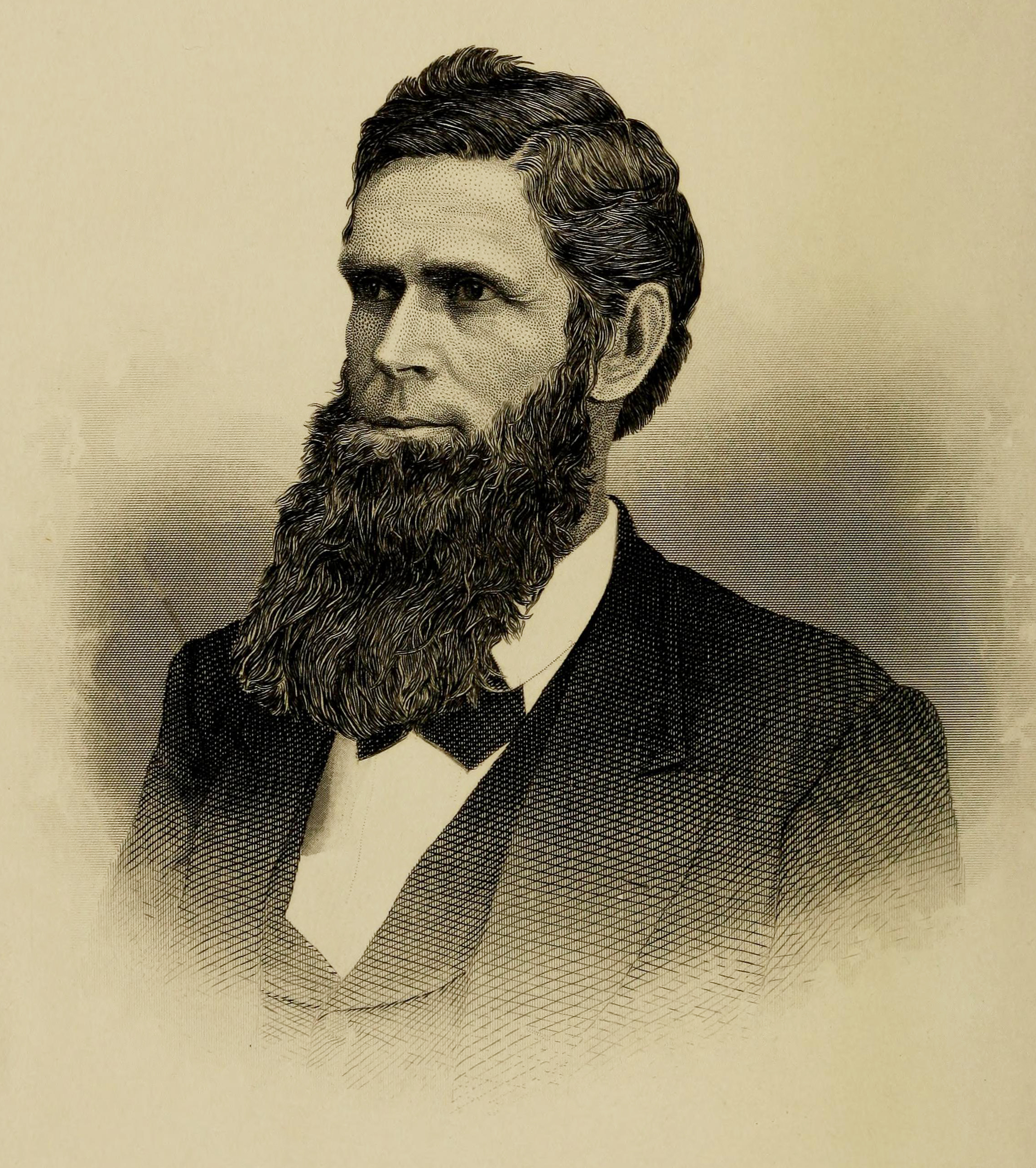
Shaw as depicted in The Life of Knowles Shaw, Singing Evangelist, 1879

Shaw died in a train wreck in McKinney, Texas, and a Methodist minister on board said that Shaw saved his life in the wreck. He was buried in East Hill Cemetery in Rushville, Indiana. His last words were: "It is a grand thing to rally people to the Cross of Christ."

== Shaw’s works ==
- Shining Pearls, 1868
- The Golden Gate, 1871
- Sparkling Jewels, 1871
- The Gospel Trumpet, 1878
- The Morning Star, 1878

== Lyrics ==
- "Bringing in the Sheaves"
- "The Handwriting on the Wall"

== Tunes ==
- "We Saw Thee Not"
- "I am the Vine and Ye are the Branches"
- "Tarry with Me"
