= George Minor =

American naval officer and composer (1845–1904)

George Minor (December 7, 1845, Richmond, Virginia – January 30, 1904, Richmond, Virginia) was an American composer and naval officer. Minor attended a military academy in Richmond, and served during the American Civil War in the Confederate States Navy (CSN). After the war, he went into the music field, teaching at singing schools and conducting at musical conventions. He helped found the Hume-Minor Company, which made pianos and organs. A member of the First Baptist Church of Richmond, Minor was the Sunday school superintendent there.

Commander Minor succeeded Captain Duncan Ingraham as the CSN's Chief of Ordnance and Hydrography in November 1861 and he was succeeded in turn by Commander John Brooke in March 1863.

== Works ==
His works include:

- Golden Light No. 1, 1879
- Golden Light No. 2
- Golden Light No. 3, 1884
- Standard Songs, 1896
- The Rosebud

Music:

- Bringing In the Sheaves

== Bibliography ==
- Luraghi, Raimondo (1996). A History of the Confederate Navy. Annapolis, Maryland: Naval Institute Press. ISBN 1-55750-527-6.
