= Swear jar =

Container used for storing money from informal fines for swearing

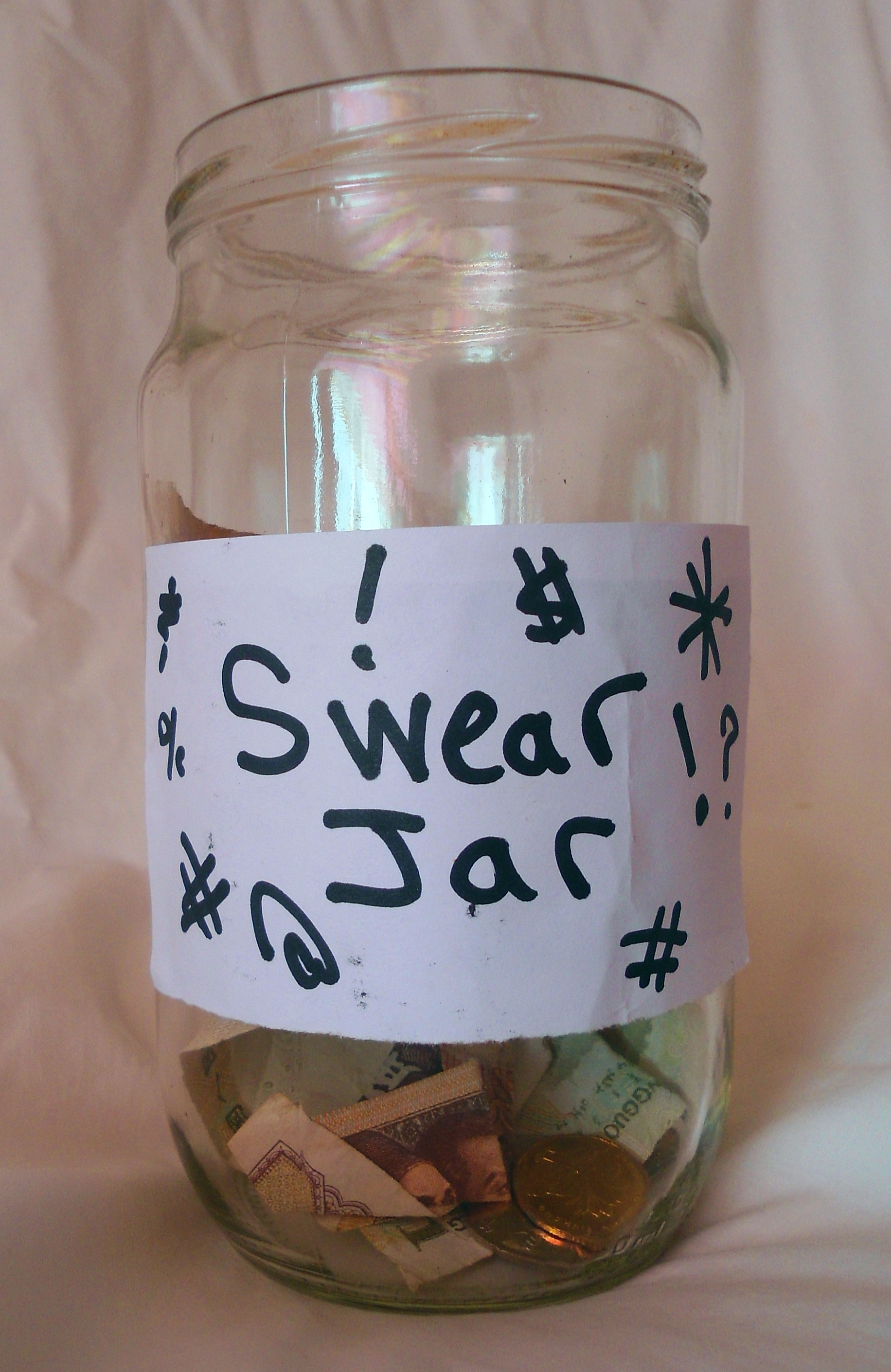
A swear jar in China containing renminbi

A swear jar (also known as a swearing jar, cuss jar, swear box or cuss bank) is a device intended to discourage people from using profanity. Every time someone uses profanity, others who witness it collect a fine, by requiring that the offender put some money into the container. The concept had existed since at least the 16th century and the modern concept appears to have originated in the 1890s.

== Description ==
A swear jar is intended to discourage people from using profanity. When a person is witnessed using profanity, the witness assesses a fine by insisting that the offender put some money into the jar or box. The container may be made of glass, porcelain, or metal, and may have a lid with a slot. A swear jar might not be a physical object; instead, a notional swear jar is referred to in order to indicate someone's use of profanity has been noted.

From time to time, the accumulated money may be used, often for some agreed-upon personal purpose or contributed to charity.

== History ==
Though not explicitly named a swear jar, the concept had existed since the 16th century:

"At Aberdeen in 1592 the attention of the council was specially engaged in repressing the swearing of "horrible and execrable oaths." They proceeded to put on foot a system of fines, and with a degree of confidence that is hardly commendable, they authorised the heads of families to keep a box in which to place the mulcts they were empowered to inflict in their households. Servants' wages were liable to be taxed at the will of their masters, and wives' pin-money at the instance of their lords."

The modern concept appears to have originated in the 1890s, under the name swear box, and to have gained popularity in the 1910s. The term swear jar appears to have been invented in the 1980s in the United States, and is not documented in Great Britain; an early mention of a swear jar is in the 1988 American movie Moving. The concept of swear box or jar became very popular in the 1980s.

== Commercial production ==
Most swear jars are homemade, but tins and boxes specifically designed for the purpose are marketed commercially, some of which have a "scale of charges" printed on them. Various materials are used to produce them. Earlier designs were commonly porcelain. Modern versions, often glass, are available online via eBay, other shopping websites, and even sites dedicated to selling only swear jars.

== See also ==
- Aversion therapy
- Behavior modification
