= Bart the Lover =

- The Simpsons episode
- Bart discovers how hurtful his prank against Edna is.
- Episode no.: Season 3 Episode 16
- Directed by: Carlos Baeza
- Written by: Jon Vitti
- Production code: 8F16
- Original air date: February 13, 1992

Guest appearance
- Marcia Wallace as Edna Krabappel

Episode features
- Couch gag: An octopus-like alien sits on the couch, and then disappears before the family arrives.
- Commentary: Matt Groening; Mike Reiss; Jon Vitti; David Silverman; Al Jean (Easter egg)

Episode chronology
← Previous "Homer Alone"	Next → "Homer at the Bat"
- The Simpsons season 3

"Bart the Lover" is the sixteenth episode of the third season of the American animated television series The Simpsons. It first aired on Fox in the United States on February 13, 1992. In the episode, Bart, playing a prank on his teacher Edna Krabappel, responds to her personal ad as a man named Woodrow, which goes off the rails. In the subplot, Ned Flanders asks Homer to curtail his swearing, so Homer starts using a swear jar.

The episode was written by Jon Vitti and directed by Carlos Baeza. Vitti had wanted an episode centered on Edna Krabappel that examined what it was like to have Bart as a student. It was the first episode of the show to feature her in a prominent role. The subplot where Homer tries to clean up his language was written partially in response to the complaints the writers had been getting about the amount of cursing on the show. Woodrow's voice (within Krabappel's imagination as she read each letter) was performed by Harry Shearer, who did an impression of Ricardo Montalbán. The picture Bart sends Edna is of NHL and WHA star Gordie Howe. The writers had originally wanted to use a picture of American football player Johnny Unitas, but were unable to get the rights to use his image.

== Plot ==
Springfield Elementary School teacher Edna Krabappel, feeling increasingly lonely and isolated due to the lack of a male presence in her life, places a personal ad in the newspaper. Meanwhile, a yo-yo craze hits the school after a troupe of performers demonstrates the potential of the toy. Bart breaks the classroom's fishtank with a yo-yo, landing him a month's worth of detention. During a detention session where Edna is not present, Bart rummages through her desk for his yo-yo and discovers her personal ad, ultimately deciding to respond to it as a prank.

Bart sends Edna a romantic letter using the alias "Woodrow" after seeing a portrait of Woodrow Wilson on the classroom wall. Using dialogue from old romance films as well as Homer's old love letters to Marge, Bart tells Edna what she wants to hear, increasing her romantic interest in Woodrow. When Edna asks to meet Woodrow for dinner so they can finally meet, Bart, intending to end the prank, responds by asking her to meet with him at the Gilded Truffle restaurant. Unwilling to keep the date, Bart goes to the movie theater next door to see a movie. On his way there, Bart sees Edna waiting for "Woodrow" and laughs. When the movie ends, Bart returns to the restaurant and feels regretful when he sees Edna crying at her table.

Bart feels worse after being unable to console Edna. Not knowing what to do, he finally tells his family about his prank letters. Lisa suggests "Woodrow" write her a goodbye letter. Together, the family collaborates on a romantic letter for Edna, with "Woodrow" announcing that he must leave but will never forget her. Edna feels better after reading it and invites Bart to spend his last day of detention outside the classroom.

Meanwhile, Marge notices that Santa's Little Helper needs a new dog house. Homer tries to save money by building one himself, but his attempts fail and he curses loudly enough for Todd Flanders to overhear and repeat the curses at dinner. Ned complains to Homer, who criticizes his mustache. Ned promises to shave it off if Homer stops swearing. Homer agrees to Marge's suggestion of putting twenty-five cents for each curse in a swear jar (as her father used the same technique to cure his swearing problem as well). Homer's constant swearing eventually puts enough money in the jar for Marge and Lisa to buy a dog house as well as a six-pack of beer for Homer for his attempts to cut back on swearing.

== Production ==
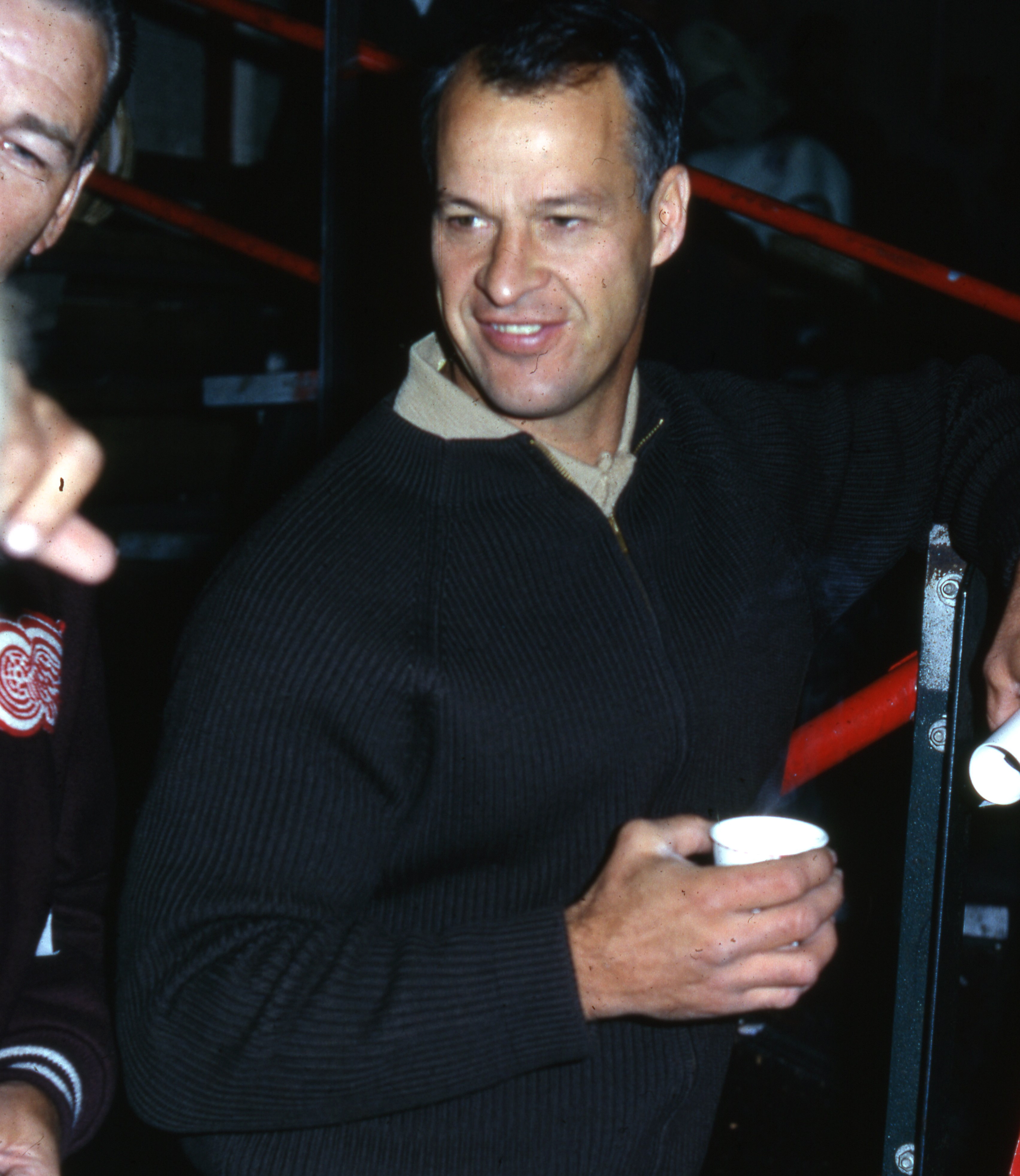
Hockey legend Gordie Howe's likeness is prominently featured in the episode

The script for "Bart the Lover" was written by Jon Vitti, who wanted an episode centered on Mrs. Krabappel that examined what it was like to have Bart as a student. Executive producer Mike Reiss pitched the idea of having Bart answer Mrs. Krabappel's personal ad. It was the first episode of the show to feature Mrs. Krabappel in a prominent role. The subplot where Homer tries to clean up his language was written partially in response to the many complaints the show had been getting about its language. Near the end of the episode, there is a montage where Homer has a series of bad experiences that cause him to curse, although the scene always cuts out before he can be heard swearing. While recording Homer's lines for that sequence, Dan Castellaneta was told to include the cursing. According to Mike Reiss, by coincidence, some eight-year-old children were allowed to visit the studio the day those lines were recorded. Reiss recalls that "their eyes were as big as saucers" after hearing Castellaneta curse. The ending of the episode was largely pitched by James L. Brooks, who wanted a scene where the entire family got together to write Woodrow's final letter to Edna.

The episode was directed by Carlos Baeza. In the background of the classroom, there are several portraits of past United States presidents. These were added for the scene where Bart tries to think of a name for his fictional letter writer, and sees a portrait of Woodrow Wilson. Woodrow's voice was performed by Harry Shearer, who did an impression of Ricardo Montalbán. The picture Bart sends Edna is of NHL and WHA star Gordie Howe. The writers had originally wanted to use a picture of American football player Johnny Unitas, but were unable to get the rights to use his image for free. Howe, their second choice, was suggested by Al Jean, who had been a Detroit Red Wings fan growing up. Howe's wife Colleen convinced him to allow the show to use his image. At the end of the episode, Howe's NHL and WHA statistics are shown because the writers decided to try something different in filling a slight time under-run.

During the opening sequence in which Bart's class watch a film about zinc, a character in the film tries to shoot himself in the head. The Fox censors objected to this, so the producers had to claim that the character was not aiming at his head. For the name of the yo-yo trick that Bart performs for Milhouse, the writers had wanted to use a term that was slang for masturbation. They proposed several names to the censors, and "Plucking the Pickle" was the term they deemed acceptable.

== Cultural references ==
The 1950s educational film at the beginning of the episode is a parody of the old science movies that were often shown in classes when the writers were in school; specifically it was a parody of the 1940s educational short A Case of Spring Fever (later featured on Mystery Science Theater 3000). The Twirl King yo-yo champions are based on groups that companies like Duncan sent to schools to perform tricks. King Crimson guitarist Adrian Belew's name appears on a paper Edna Krabappel is grading during detention. Bart sees the fictional movie Ernest Needs a Kidney, featuring Ernest P. Worrell. Mrs. Krabappel flips through an issue of Springfield Magazine, which features an interview with the reclusive J. D. Salinger. Her copy of Playdude features "Updike On the Martini." Rod and Todd Flanders sing "Bringing in the Sheaves", because the writers liked having them sing "obscure religious songs". Todd watches a show based on Gomer Pyle, U.S.M.C.. Ned asks "Is this all he watches?" Maude says "He used to watch Davey and Goliath, but he thought the idea of a talking dog was blasphemous."

== Reception ==
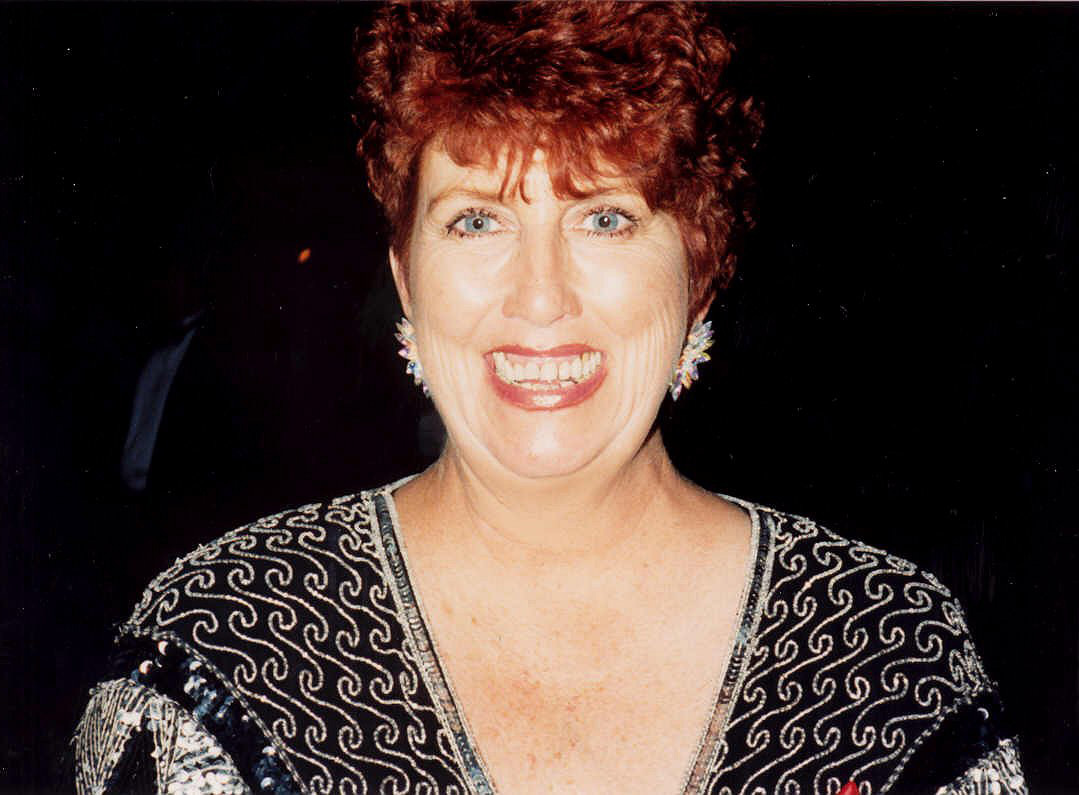
Marcia Wallace won an Emmy for Outstanding Voice-Over as Mrs. Krabappel.

In its original airing on Fox during February sweeps, the episode had a 12.9 Nielsen rating and was viewed in approximately 11.88 million homes. It finished the week of February 10–16, 1992 ranked 29th, up from the season's average rank of 39th. The Simpsons was the second highest rated show on Fox that week, after Married... with Children. Since airing, the episode has received positive reviews from television critics. It was named the eighth best episode of The Simpsons by Sarah Culp of The Quindecim.

Bill Gibron of DVD Verdict said "Bart the Lover" represents The Simpsons "at its apex as a well tuned talent machine grinding out the good stuff with surprising accuracy and skill". Gibron added that the episode shows that the made-up romance between Mrs. Krabappel and Woodrow "works because it's so painfully true. [...] How the kiss-off to Mrs. Krabappel is created and handled shows that The Simpsons has heart to add to its humor." Nate Meyers of Digitally Obsessed rated the episode a 5 (of 5). He thought the intertwining of the two plots in the episode "works very well, creating a fast paced story. Bart's alias, Woodrow, is a delight to hear in voice-overs and Homer's antics produce many laughs."

DVD Movie Guide's Colin Jacobson said "Bart the Lover" stands out as a "very strong episode" because it "steers clear of most potentially sappy material and offers a lively piece. [...] The 'B' story in which Homer tries not to swear also swings and creates some great moments." The authors of the book I Can't Believe It's a Bigger and Better Updated Unofficial Simpsons Guide, Gary Russell and Gareth Roberts, said they "loved" Homer's suggestion for the kiss-off letter from Woodrow: "Dear Baby. Welcome to Dumpsville, population: you. P.S. I am gay." In 2000, the staff of the Star Tribune listed their top ten episodes. "Bart the Lover" was listed at number four.

In the July 26, 2007 issue of Nature, the scientific journal's editorial staff listed an education film seen in the episode among "The Top Ten science moments in The Simpsons", writing: "'Thank goodness I still live in a world of telephones, car batteries, handguns and many things made of zinc,' says Jimmy, a character in an educational film. When confronted with a world without zinc he attempts suicide but fails, as his zinc-free gun cannot work." In 2002, Bill Brioux of The Canadian Press ranked the episode and its use of Gordie Howe as the top reference to Canada on the show. In 2004, ESPN released a list of the Top 100 Simpsons sport moments, ranking Gordie Howe's image in the episode at number 34. Nathan Rabin praised Marcia Wallace's performance: "Edna easily could have been a shrill caricature of a man-hungry shrew but Wallace gets us to care about a woman with precious few redeeming qualities beyond a desperate need to be loved." In 2013, a Wired article written in response to Wallace's death described "Bart the Lover" as "the best Krabappel (and arguably best Simpsons) episode".
