= Edna Krabappel =

Fictional character from The Simpsons franchise

Edna Krabappel-Flanders
- The Simpsons character
- First appearance: "Bart the Genius" (1990)
- Last appearance: "Diary Queen" (2021)
- Created by: Jay Kogen; Wallace Wolodarsky
- Designed by: Matt Groening
- Voiced by: Marcia Wallace

In-universe information
- Full name: Edna Krabappel-Flanders
- Gender: Female
- Occupation: Fourth grade teacher at Springfield Elementary School
- Spouses: Ken Krabappel (ex-husband); Ned Flanders (husband)
- Significant others: Seymour Skinner (ex-fiancé); Comic Book Guy (ex-fiancé) Moe Syzlack
- Relatives: Rod and Todd (stepsons); Nedward Flanders, Sr. (father-in-law); Mona Flanders (mother-in-law)

Edna Krabappel-Flanders (/krəˈbɑːpəl/ krə-BAH-pəl, Low German: [ˈɛtna ˈkʁapʔapl̩]; née Krabappel) is a fictional character from the American animated sitcom The Simpsons, voiced by Marcia Wallace. A 4th-grade teacher, she teaches Bart Simpson's class at Springfield Elementary School. In the twenty-third season, she marries Ned Flanders.

Following Marcia Wallace's death in 2013, the show's producers announced that her character would be retired. The epilogue of the season 25 episode "The Man Who Grew Too Much" marks Edna Krabappel's final original speaking role.

== Profile ==
Edna Krabappel holds a Master's from Bryn Mawr College. She is a surly, grumpy and jaded caricature of the American public school system. In "The Seemingly Never-Ending Story", it is revealed that she was once a very optimistic woman who genuinely wanted to help people in need. However, after years of frustration with the school, and her constant battles with Bart Simpson in particular, she eventually became a much more bitter person.

There is some inconsistency about Edna's origins. She is said to have come to Springfield to begin teaching in "The Seemingly Never-Ending Story". However, in a case of retconning, she can be seen in "Springfield Up" as a student running through the background at Springfield High School while a young Chief Wiggum is filmed carrying out his duties as a hall monitor as part of the documentary featured in that episode.

Edna smokes heavily, including during school hours. In the episode "Grade School Confidential", she and Principal Skinner have a romance after they are invited to Martin Prince's birthday party. They are witnessed kissing in Martin's playhouse by Bart. Principal Skinner then sends Bart to relay a message to Edna in front of his classmates who laugh at him, making him furious. He then shows them what they are doing and tells them not to tell anyone about their relationship, especially Superintendent Chalmers. Unknown to Bart they lose their jobs when Superintendent Chalmers finds out about their affair via Chief Wiggum and they lock themselves in the school with Bart until they are reinstated. They apologize to Bart for embarrassing him. After returning to their jobs, they resume their romance in a janitorial closet. In "Bart Gets a 'Z'", she is fired from teaching when she becomes drunk after drinking coffee that was spiked with alcohol by Bart. She later decides to open a muffin store. She is later rehired when the substitute teacher gets drunk. In "Moms I'd Like to Forget", she fights a fifth grade teacher, Mike, who talks badly about her students; this leads to a massive teacher brawl. In "The Ned-Liest Catch", she is suspended from teaching for slapping Bart and is placed in the Teacher Holding Facility. When Bart attempts to free her, she falls off a ladder but is saved by Ned Flanders.

== Love life ==
A recurring theme is Edna's desire for a romantic partner. She is divorced; in "Separate Vocations", she implies that her husband left her for their marriage counselor with whom he had an affair. In early episodes, she is shown as very sexually aggressive and promiscuous: in "Flaming Moe's", she is shown with her arms around two sailors in the parody of the famous Cheers theme, and tries to pick up Aerosmith drummer Joey Kramer and Homer Simpson, even after learning he is married and is Bart's father. In "Bart's Friend Falls in Love", while the children are watching an unseen explicit scene in Fuzzy Bunny's Guide to You-Know-What, a sex ed film, she says to the children in disgust, "She's faking it". In the same episode, Nelson Muntz asks why she does not live with "Mr. Krabappel"; she tells him that her ex-husband "chased something small and fluffy down the rabbit hole". In "One Fish, Two Fish, Blowfish, Blue Fish", she has a "hot encounter" with a local Japanese sushi chef in the backseat of her car.

The episode "Bart the Lover" was the first episode to give Edna a central role, and also to expand her character and personality. In the episode, she has a personal ad placed in the newspaper so she can find a man. The advertisement is answered by Bart – under the alias of "Woodrow", a seemingly perfect male lover named after former President Woodrow Wilson – as a prank. This results in a cycle of romantic letters between both Edna and "Woodrow". Intending to finish the prank, Bart invites Edna to the Gilded Truffle Restaurant so she can meet with Woodrow. Edna waits expectantly for Woodrow, but is heartbroken after he does not appear. With his family's help, Bart writes a goodbye letter to Edna as Woodrow, satisfying her.

Edna appears to be desired by many men (and in one case even women, when Patty Bouvier once had a sexual fantasy with Edna), as seen in Sideshow Bob's outrage (in "Brother from Another Series") wherein his romantic date with her is ruined by a spying Bart: "You only get one chance with Edna Krabappel!"

Another theme is her relationship with the school principal, Seymour Skinner. In the episode "Grade School Confidential", she develops a secret romance with Skinner, a relationship that almost leads to marriage. In the episode "Special Edna", Skinner proposes to Edna, to which she agrees. However, in the episode "My Big Fat Geek Wedding", Edna leaves Skinner at the altar after realizing that he doesn't want to marry her. Since then, Edna's attitudes to Skinner have vacillated between passion and disdain in various episodes. In The Simpsons Movie, she can be seen at the Green Day concert on top of Seymour's shoulders wearing a T-shirt saying "Not my boyfriend" with an arrow pointing down at Skinner.

In season 17 ("The Seemingly Never-Ending Story"), a flashback showed that Edna was in a serious relationship with Moe Szyslak when she first moved to Springfield, before meeting Skinner or even becoming a teacher. She was about to elope with him, but then changed her mind when she met Bart Simpson, a student she believed needed help. Consequently, Moe breaks up with her. At the end of the episode, Moe and Edna are a couple once again, much to Skinner's jealousy when he catches them making out on school property. In "Regarding Margie", she and Principal Skinner are seen making love on a golf course. Then he climbs off and she says, "Birthday is over, Seymour", and lights up a cigarette.

During the 22nd episode of the 22nd season, "The Ned-Liest Catch", Ned Flanders and Edna began dating (though the two have dated previously in the episode "Alone Again, Natura-Diddily"). The fate of the couple was left to a fan vote, to be revealed during the 23rd season opener. When "The Falcon and the D'ohman" debuted, it revealed that the fans voted in favor of the relationship. At the close of the episode, a disclaimer appeared on screen which stated – "What our fans have joined together, let no writer rip asunder". It is also revealed in "The Ned-Liest Catch" that she has "dated" in addition to Skinner, Moe Szyslak, Lenny, Carl, Comic Book Guy, Joey Kramer, Krusty the Clown, Cletus Spuckler, and several others.

It is revealed in the episode "Ned 'n' Edna's Blend Agenda" that Edna and Ned married in secret (although she continues to use her first married name, Krabappel, as a teacher), and the town throws them a proper reception. In the episode "Left Behind", Ned took a teaching job as a way to honor Edna's memory after she dies. In the 30th-season episode, "My Way or the Highway to Heaven", Edna is seen in heaven next to George Washington while Maude Flanders is seen next to Abraham Lincoln.

== Character ==
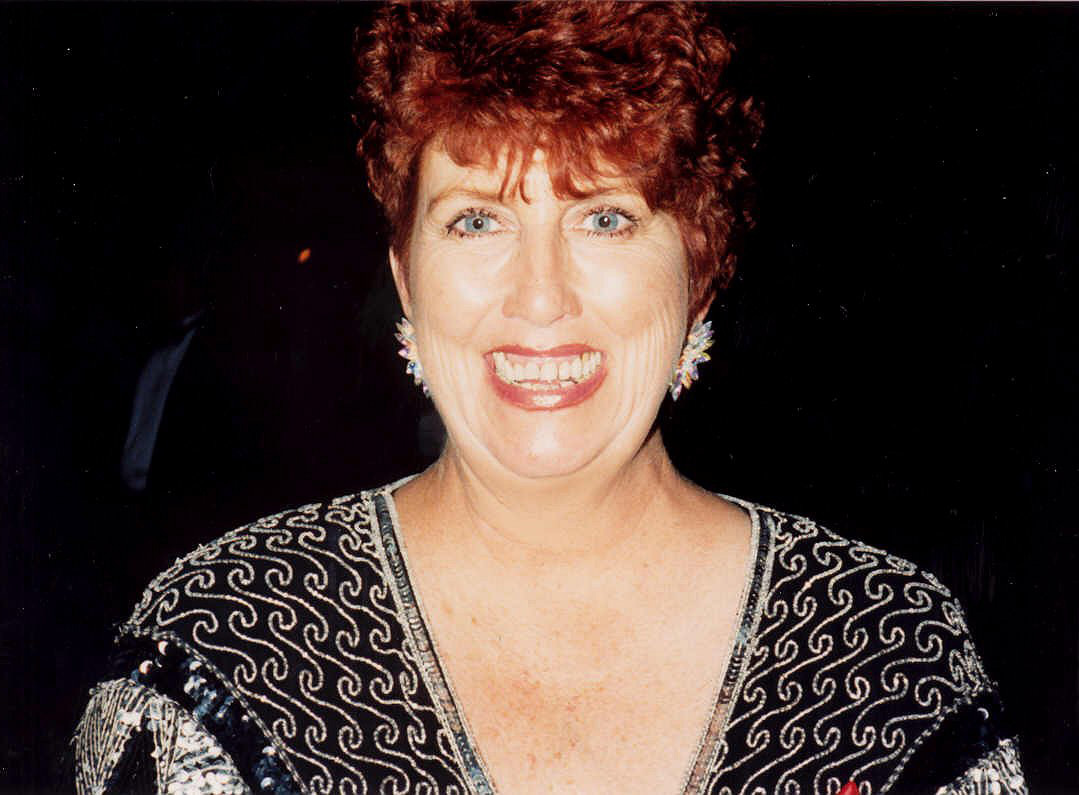
Marcia Wallace, the voice of Edna Krabappel

Krabappel's name was chosen by early Simpsons writers Wallace Wolodarsky and Jay Kogen as a play on the fruit "crabapple" and as a reference to the teacher Miss Crabtree from the 1930s Our Gang shorts. Also, there was an initial joke of everyone mispronouncing the character's last name as "Crabapple" until Milhouse uses it in a later episode, stunning the other children. The real Seymour Skinner also mispronounced her name. In one episode, Homer is horrified to learn that no one has corrected him for accidentally calling her "Crandall". Like many characters, Ms. Krabappel has a memorable catchphrase, used often in the series: her derisive laugh ("HA!").

=== Retirement ===
Marcia Wallace died on October 25, 2013; according to her son, the cause of death was related to pneumonia. Staff on The Simpsons had reportedly been aware of her illness. Showrunner Al Jean said, "I was tremendously saddened to learn this morning of the passing of the brilliant and gracious Marcia Wallace." Although Julie Kavner, the voice of Marge Simpson, was considered to replace Wallace, Jean announced that the show would retire her character. The series first acknowledged Wallace's passing in the episode "Four Regrettings and a Funeral", in which the chalkboard gag in the opening sequence was changed to read a single "We'll really miss you Mrs. K". The episode "The Man Who Grew Too Much" later showed Ned Flanders wearing a black armband and mourning Edna, whose portrait joined that of Maude, Ned's first wife.

=== Posthumous character appearances ===
In "Moho House" (season 28, episode 21), she appears as a ghost with Maude when Marge looks at everyone enjoying their spouses. She also appears as a ghost together with Maude in "Monty Burns' Fleeing Circus", while Ned is watching his sons perform a song on stage. In "Todd, Todd, Why Hast Thou Forsaken Me?" (season 31, episode 9), she accompanies Maude Flanders as they greet Ned and Homer into Heaven, and appears again at the end of the episode as a ghost hovering over Ned's bed, saying, "Ha!". In "Diary Queen" (season 32, episode 12), the episode is centred around her diary and she guest-stars through archive recordings.

== Cultural impact and reception ==
Marcia Wallace won an Emmy Award in 1992 for voicing Krabappel in the third-season episode "Bart the Lover". IGN called "Special Edna" the best episode of the fourteenth season of the show. Tilda Swinton modeled her hairdo in the film Burn After Reading on Krabappel's. The Guardian ranked Krabappel as the 8th-best teacher.
