= Marcia Wallace =

American actress and comedienne (1942–2013)

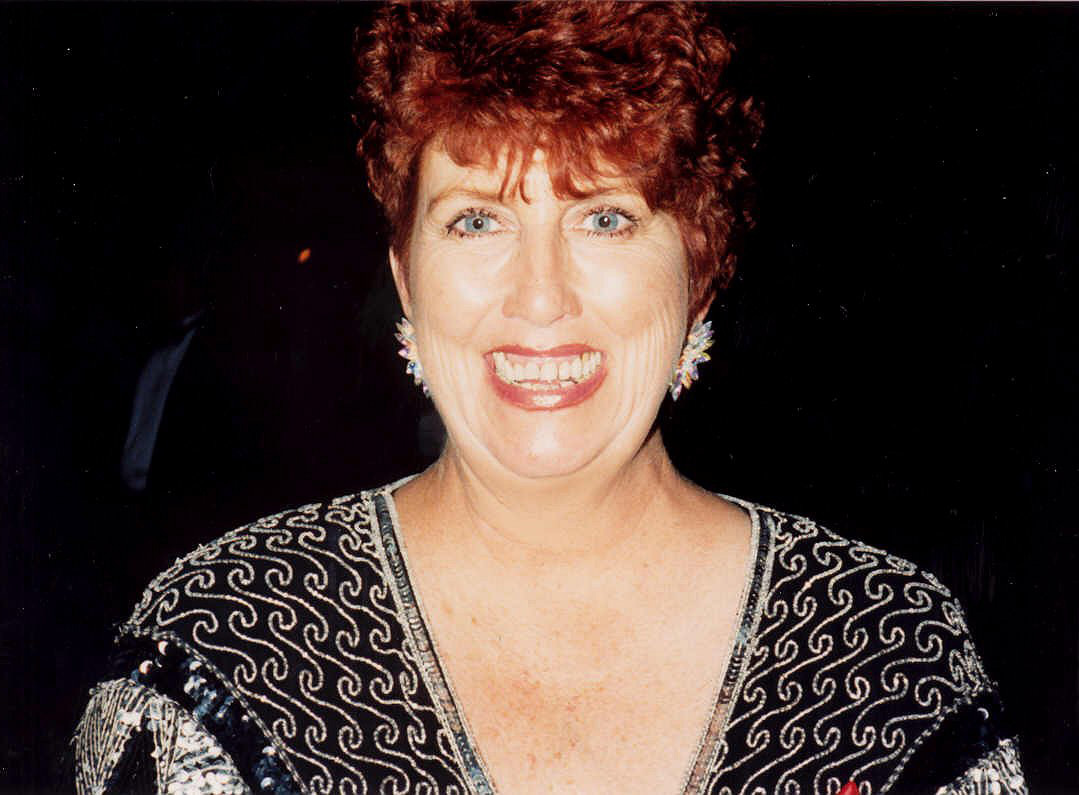
- Wallace in 1994
- Born: Marcia Karen Wallace; November 1, 1942; Creston, Iowa, U.S.
- Died: October 25, 2013 (aged 70); Los Angeles, California, U.S.
- Education: Parsons College
- Occupations: Actress; comedian
- Years active: 1967–2013
- Known for: The Bob Newhart Show; Full House; The Simpsons
- Spouse: Dennis Hawley (m. 1986; died 1992)
- Children: 1

Marcia Karen Wallace (November 1, 1942 – October 25, 2013) was an American actress and comedian, primarily known for her roles on sitcoms. She is best known for her role as receptionist Carol Kester on The Bob Newhart Show (1972–1978) and as the voice of elementary school teacher Edna Krabappel on the animated series The Simpsons, for which she won a Primetime Emmy Award for Outstanding Voice-Over Performance in 1992. The character was retired after her death but sporadically appears through archive recording.

Wallace was known for her tall frame, red hair, and distinctive laugh. She had a career spanning five decades on TV, film, and stage. She was a frequent guest on The Merv Griffin Show, which led to her receiving a personal request to appear on The Bob Newhart Show in a role created especially for her. Diagnosed with breast cancer in 1985, she became a cancer activist, and remained so until her death in 2013.

== Early life ==
Wallace was born in the small, rural town of Creston, Iowa, on November 1, 1942, the eldest of three children of Arthur "Poke" Wallace and Joann Wallace. Her father owned and operated Wallace Sundries, a general merchandise store, where Marcia, her sister Sharon, and brother Jim would often help. While Wallace attended Creston High School, a teacher encouraged her to consider a career in acting after she did well in a school play. Following her 1960 graduation from high school, Wallace attended Parsons College in Fairfield, Iowa, which had offered her a full scholarship. She was a member of the Delta Nu chapter of Delta Zeta sorority. Wallace was named the "Delta Zeta 2010 Woman of the Year" at their 2010 Biennial National Convention. At Parsons, she majored in English and Theater, graduating in 1964, and performing in several campus productions, including Brigadoon and The Music Man.

== Career ==
On the day she graduated from college at Parsons, Wallace moved from Iowa to New York with $148 in her pocket. To make ends meet, she typed scripts, performed in summer stock local theatre, did commercials, and worked as a substitute English teacher in The Bronx in the late 1960s. After performing for a year in a Greenwich Village nightclub, Wallace and four fellow entertainer friends formed an improvisational group called The Fourth Wall. In 1968, Wallace appeared for a year off-Broadway with the group. Afterwards, she made several other appearances in improvisational shows, appeared in a nude production of Dark of the Moon at the avant-garde Mercer Arts Center (now The Kitchen) in Greenwich Village.

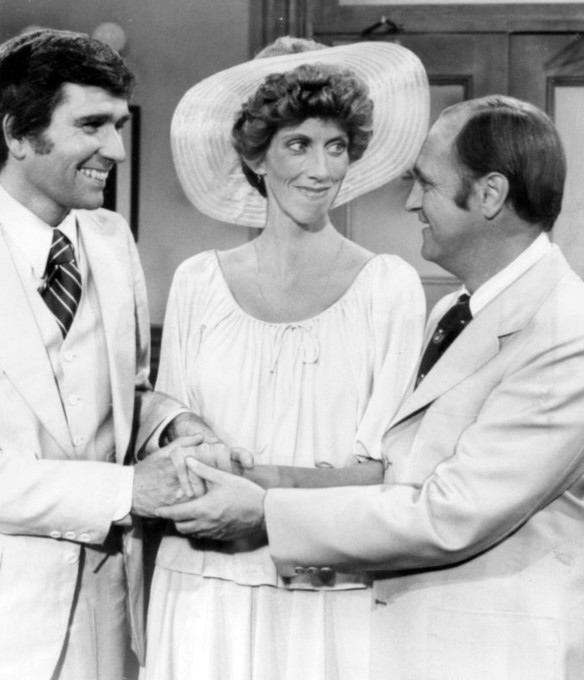
Marcia Wallace with Bob Newhart (right) and Will Mackenzie in a fourth-season episode of The Bob Newhart Show, "Carol's Wedding" (1975)

Wallace was a semiregular on The Merv Griffin Show, appearing over 75 times. When the show moved its production from New York to Los Angeles, Wallace moved with it at Merv Griffin's request. One of these appearances in March 1972 led to a phone call from TV producer Grant Tinker, who offered Wallace a supporting role on the new MTM Enterprises television production The Bob Newhart Show on the recommendation of William S. Paley, the CEO of CBS. The role of Carol Kester, the sarcastic and eccentric office receptionist to Dr. Robert Hartley, Bob Newhart's central character, was written specifically for her.

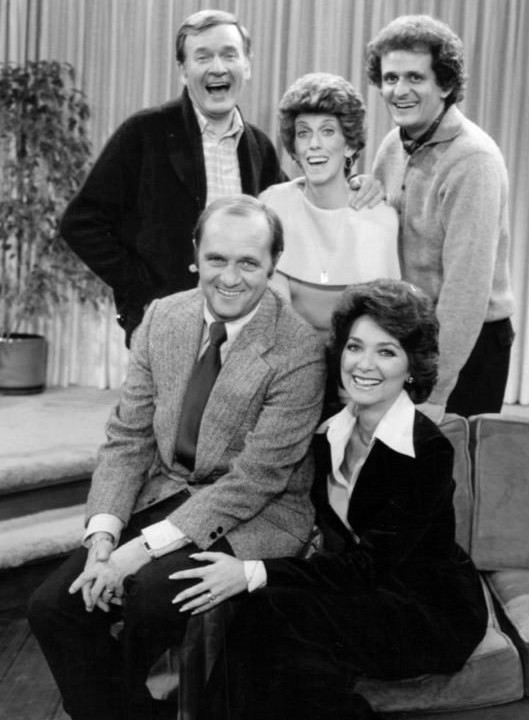
(L to R): Bill Daily, Bob Newhart, Wallace, Suzanne Pleshette, and Peter Bonerz in The Bob Newhart Show (1977)

Wallace frequently appeared on television game shows, including Match Game; Hollywood Squares; Password Plus and Super Password; Celebrity Whew!; Cross-Wits; Hot Potato; Body Language; Pyramid; Double Talk; Win, Lose or Draw; Tattletales; To Tell the Truth; Acting Crazy; Family Feud; and Card Sharks. In 2008, she appeared on the interactive show GSN Live on the Game Show Network.

Wallace played Darrin Stephens' secretary in a 1971 episode of Bewitched; appeared twice on The Brady Bunch (once as Marcia's teacher in "Getting Davy Jones" and once as a wig salesperson in "Will the Real Jan Brady Please Stand Up?"); played school principal Mrs. Lyman in two episodes of ALF; and as Mrs. Carruthers in four episodes of Full House. Wallace also had guest appearances on Charles in Charge; Murder, She Wrote; Magnum, P.I.; Columbo; and A Different World. On one of the last episodes of Taxi, she portrayed herself, chosen as the ideal date of Rev. Jim Ignatowski. In 1994, Wallace and Bob Newhart reprised their roles from The Bob Newhart Show on an episode of Murphy Brown. In the 2000s, Wallace played Maggie Hawley on That's My Bush!, and, in 2009, appeared on The Young and the Restless, playing Annie Wilkes, an inefficient assistant kidnapper.

After The Simpsons began in 1989, Wallace joined the voice acting cast as the voice of Edna Krabappel, whom she played until her death in 2013. In 1992, she received a Primetime Emmy Award for Outstanding Voice-Over Performance for the episode "Bart the Lover" on The Simpsons.

On film, Wallace appeared in such features as My Mom's a Werewolf, Teen Witch, and Ghoulies III: Ghoulies Go to College. In the 2008 film Tru Loved, she played a high school drama teacher who sponsors a gay–straight alliance.

Wallace's work onstage included An Almost Perfect Person in Los Angeles which she also produced; a tour of the female version of Neil Simon's The Odd Couple; Same Time, Next Year; Twigs; It Had to Be You; Supporting Cast; Prisoner of Second Avenue; and Plaza Suite. Wallace made her musical stage debut in the 1983 California Musical Theatre's Sacramento Music Circus production of Gypsy. She returned the following season in the musical Promises, Promises. Other stage productions included Born Yesterday; You're a Good Man, Charlie Brown; Steel Magnolias; and Last of the Red Hot Lovers, in which she played all three female roles at various times. She performed in The Vagina Monologues production in Los Angeles, New York, Chicago and San Diego. In 2013, shortly before her death, she voiced the character of the librarian in Monsters University, and in 2014 (posthumously) she portrayed herself in the movie Muffin Top: A Love Story.

== Personal life ==
Wallace married hotelier Dennis Hawley on May 18, 1986, in a Buddhist ceremony. The couple adopted an infant son, Michael Wallace "Mikey" Hawley. Dennis Hawley died from pancreatic cancer in June 1992.

Wallace was diagnosed with breast cancer in 1985, after which she became an activist and lecturer on the subject. In 2007, Wallace was awarded the Gilda Radner Courage Award by the Roswell Park Comprehensive Cancer Center in Buffalo, New York for helping educate Americans about the importance of early cancer detection and inspiring others through her 20 years as a breast cancer survivor.

Wallace's autobiography, titled Don't Look Back, We're Not Going That Way, was published in 2004. Besides describing her film and TV career, the book importantly recounts the early detection of her breast cancer, the early loss of her husband Dennis, her nervous breakdown, her single motherhood, and other personal experiences such as a private history of bulimia. She credited the title of the book to her father, who used the phrase often during her childhood.

She was noted on a list of "Famous Iowans" by her important state capital daily newspaper, the Des Moines Register, in November 2013.

== Death and legacy ==
Wallace died from pneumonia and sepsis on October 25, 2013, at age 70. Breast cancer was also listed as a significant condition on her death certificate. Wallace was cremated following a private funeral service.

Staff on The Simpsons had reportedly been aware of her ill health. Showrunner Al Jean said, "I was tremendously saddened to learn this morning of the passing of the brilliant and gracious Marcia Wallace." Jean said that producers planned to retire her "irreplaceable" character Edna Krabappel. Yeardley Smith, who voices Lisa Simpson, tweeted, "Heaven is now a much funnier place b/c of you, Marcia." Bob Newhart commented on his Facebook fan page, "Marcia's death came as quite a shock, she left us too early. She was a talented actress and dear friend".

The Simpsons episode "Four Regrettings and a Funeral" was shown on November 3, 2013, and dedicated to her, with the chalkboard gag showing Bart having written a single line "We'll really miss you Mrs. K", while looking sad. Wallace had recorded lines for several upcoming episodes, and her final episode, "The Man Who Grew Too Much", aired on March 9, 2014.

In February 2021, it was announced that archival recordings of Marcia Wallace's voice that she provided as Edna Krabappel would be making a final appearance on The Simpsons. The character is mentioned in a chalkboard gag and shown in flashback scenes in the show's 696th episode, entitled "Diary Queen". In an interview with Variety regarding the announcement, Al Jean remarked, "We never got the chance to give sort of a proper goodbye to her in the show, and this is a small attempt to do that."

== Filmography ==
=== Film ===
Year	Title	Role	Notes
1980	Pray TV	Alice Kidd	
1989	Teen Witch	Ms. Edith Malloy	
1989	My Mom's a Werewolf	Peggy	
1990	Ghoulies III: Ghoulies Go to College	Miss Boggs	Video
1998	The Christmas Path	Mrs. Claus	
2001	You Never Know		Short
2004	Forever for Now	Ellie	
2007	The Simpsons Movie	Mrs. Edna Krabappel	(voice, scenes deleted)
2007	Big Stan	Alma	
2008	Tru Loved	Mrs. Lewis	
2013	Monsters University	Additional Voices (voice)	
2014	Muffin Top: A Love Story	Marcia Wallace	Released posthumously in November 2014

=== Television ===
Year	Title	Role	Notes
1967	The Invaders	Courtroom Spectator (uncredited)	Season 2 Episode 6: "The Trial"
1971	Bewitched	Betty	Season 7 Episode 27: "Laugh, Clown, Laugh"
1971	The Brady Bunch	Saleswoman / Mrs. Robbins	2 episodes
1972	Columbo	Woman / Woman in Inquest (uncredited)	2 episodes
1972	Love, American Style	Bertha	Season 3 Episode 16: "segment: Love and the Topless Policy"
1972–1978	The Bob Newhart Show	Carol Kester Bondurant	Series regular
1978	Insight	Augusta	Season 1 Episode 417: "Second Chorus"
1978	The Love Boat	Mrs. O'Roarke	Season 1 Episode 23: "Musical Cabins"
1978	Flying High	Connie Martin	Season 1 Episode 0: "Flying High"
1979	The Castaways on Gilligan's Island	Myra Elliott	TV Movie
1979	Fantasy Island	Martha Meeks	Season 3 Episode 13: "The Inventor/On the Other Side"
1980	Gridlock	Boom Boom Shavelson	TV Movie
1980	Characters	Leila Flynn	TV Movie
1980	CHiPs	Marcia Wallace (uncredited)	Season 4 Episode 6: "The Great 5K Star Race and Boulder Wrap Party: Part 2"
1981	Magnum, P.I.	Barbara Terranova	Season 1 Episode 18: "Beauty Knows No Pain"
1982	Taxi	Marcia Wallace	Season 5 Episode 1: "Love Un-American Style"
1983	Gimme a Break!	Hilda	Season 2 Episode 20: "Glenlawn Street Blues"
1984	Finder of Lost Loves	Daisy and Cary's Friend	Season 1 Episode 1: "Maxwell Ltd: Finder of Lost Loves Pilot"
1985	Down to Earth	Grace	Season 4 Episode 17: "The Bag Lady"
1986	Murder, She Wrote	Polly Barth	Season 3 Episode 5: "Corned Beef and Carnage"
1987	ALF	Mrs. Lyman	2 episodes
1988	Night Court	Miss Phillips	Season 5 Episode 16: "Another Day in the Life"
1988	Mathnet	Mrs. Wynn	Season 2 Episode 4: "The View from the Rear Terrace"
1988	Small Wonder	Miss Cratchit	Season 4 Episode 12: "Tag, You're It"
1989–1990	Charles in Charge	Dodo	2 episodes
1990	What a Dummy		Season 1 Episode 10: "The Substitute"
1990–2014	The Simpsons	Edna Krabappel / Various others	Series regular, posthumous (Season 25), archival audio (everything after that)
1991	The Munsters Today	Dr. Susan Evans	Season 3 Episode 22: "Diary of a Mad Munsterwife"
1991–1992	Darkwing Duck	Clovis / Mrs. Cavanaugh (voice) / Didi Lovelost (voice)	4 episodes
1992	Hearts Are Wild	Agnes Biederbeck	Season 1 Episode 8: "Coming Home"
1992	Raw Toonage	Female Tourist (voice)	Season 1 Episode 8: "Dogzapoppin'/The Hairy Ape/A Fear of Kites"
1992	A Different World	Waitress	Season 6 Episode 13: "White Christmas"
1992	Camp Candy	(voice)	Season 3 Episode 6: "When It Rains... It Snows"
1992–1993	The Addams Family	Mrs. Blossom (voice)	21 episodes
1993	Batman: The Animated Series	'Dark Interlude' Actress (voice)	Season 2 Episode 3: "Mudslide"
1993	Captain Planet and the Planeteers	Mrs. Wheeler (voice)	Season 4 Episode 10: "Talkin' Trash"
1993–1995	Full House	Mrs. Carruthers	4 episodes
1994	Aladdin	Oopa (voice)	Season 2 Episode 37: "The Game"
1994–1998	Murphy Brown	Carol - Secretary #66 / Molly	2 episodes
1995	Kirk	Lamerle	Season 1 Episode 7: "The Crush"
1996	The Bold and the Beautiful	Librarian	Episode 2386: "Episode #1.2386"
1997	Teen Angel	Angela	Season 1 Episode 1: "Marty Buys the Farm"
1997	George and Leo	Marcia	Season 1 Episode 8: "The Cameo Episode"
1998	I Am Weasel	Woman - Old Woman (voice)	Season 3 Episode 9: "Driver's Sped"
1998	Cow and Chicken	Woman - Old Woman (voice)	Season 3 Episode 9: "The Day I Was Born/Factory Follies/I.M. Weasel: Driver's Sped"
1998	The Angry Beavers	Mrs. Beaver (voice)	Season 2 Episode 11: "If You Insisters/Alley Oops!"
1999	Maggie	Head Nurse	Season 1 Episode 22: "Uh-Oh Baby"
2001	That's My Bush!	Maggie Hawley	8 episodes
2002	Providence	Glenda	Season 4 Episode 21: "Smoke and Mirrors"
2002	Rugrats	Mrs. Rapple (voice)	Season 9 Episode 9: "They Came from the Backyard/Lil's Phil of Trash"
2003	7th Heaven	Nurse	3 episodes
2004	Triple Play	Waitress	TV Short
2009	The Young and the Restless	Annie Wilkes	14 episodes (Recurring role)
2010	Vampire Mob	Virginia Jones (2010)	

=== Video games ===
Year	Title	Voice role	Notes
1997	The Simpsons: Virtual Springfield	Edna Krabappel	(uncredited)
2001	The Simpsons: Road Rage	Edna Krabappel	
2007	The Simpsons Game	Edna Krabappel	

=== Music videos ===
Year	Title	Role
1990	Bart Simpson: Do the Bartman	Edna Krabappel (voice)
