= Reception of The Simpsons =

The Simpsons is an American animated sitcom created by Matt Groening for the Fox Broadcasting Company. Since its premiere on December 17, 1989, critical reception and commentary on the show has changed significantly over its run. The Simpsons' golden era is widely considered to be among the most influential media ever produced. Discussion of the show following the supposed "end of the golden era" has been related to the decline in quality, the causes of that change, and possible solutions.

Some of the show's creators and critics have denied this decline, and defended episodes and trends, while others have acknowledged that while the show is not as good as it used to be, having such a high bar for comparison is unfair and blinds the viewer to the quality of the more recent episodes. A silver or bronze age of the show, where it returned to its roots with content reminiscent of the 1990s episodes, (Note: The first episode of The Simpsons to air in the 1990s was season 1's "Bart the Genius", while the last was season 11's "Grift of the Magi".) has been identified as lasting from either the 2007 film The Simpsons Movie or the 20th season in 2008–2009 through to at least the 24th season in 2012–2013. The relevance of discussions about the quality of the show is debated.

== History ==
=== The Simpsons' golden era ===
Critics' reviews of early Simpsons episodes praised the show for its wit, realism, and intelligence. A writer for Indiewire said that throughout The Simpsons' golden era, it was "a show largely seen as one of the freshest, insightful and widely accessible pop culture achievement". Jim Schembri of The Sydney Morning Herald called the show "a cultural touchstone for at least two—possibly three—generations of couch potatoes". During the show's first season, Ken Tucker of Entertainment Weekly said, in response to a Fox press release saying the show "represent the American family at its wildest!", that "The Simpsons are the American family at its most complicated, drawn as simple cartoons. It's this neat paradox that makes millions of people turn away from the three big networks on Sunday nights to concentrate on The Simpsons".

During the show's fourth season, he said "in its constant acknowledgment of history, current events, and forms of art and entertainment other than television, The Simpsons is probably the most realistically surreal cartoon series ever; the show is always striving not only to be funnier but also tighter, more precise in its sarcasm, and (in its own brusquely unsentimental way) more moving." During the show's eighth season, he said "There is a constant sense of surprise — a wily exuberance — about [the show] that still hasn't abated after eight seasons: This is one of the sharpest, most purely pleasurable television series ever. What began [as filler sketches] has become one of [animation's] most dependable entertainments, a cartoon that transcended cartoonishness a long time ago. In the world of The Simpsons, everyone has a purpose; everything exists to make a point. In that sense, this cartoon is the most humanistic show on television.

Darren Franich of PopWatch explains that "The [19]90s-era Simpsons weren't funny because of the references — they were funny because the writing was snappy, the characters were fully-realized, and the individual episode plots were structured so well. There was wordplay, and farce, and topical satire. (There was also just outright silliness — see Sideshow Bob getting hit by all those rakes.) (Note: As seen in the season 5 episode "Cape Feare") The references were the icing, not the cake." Matt Zoller Seitz of Vulture says, "Together with Seinfeld and It's Garry Shandling's Show, The Simpsons refined a new TV template, the meta-sitcom — a half-hour comedy spiked with satire, pop-culture references, and postmodern riffs worthy of Ernie Kovacs and Monty Python."

Simpsons writer and producer Conan O'Brien commented on the quality of the writing during the show's golden era:

"You write an outline, then you revisit every single joke in front of everybody, and then you do a first draft, then you do a second draft, then you do another draft, and then there's a read with the actors, but then it goes off, then it comes back, and there's an animatic, but there's still time to fix the jokes and revisit them. By the time an episode came out, you had maybe heard the script read through like 20 times, and if for some reason the joke wasn't getting a laugh on the 21st time, you had to rework it. Obviously it's clearly a strength of The Simpsons that by the time you see it, things have been road-tested and thought about and so much work has gone into it."

John Swartzwelder, who wrote for the show until 2003, expressed a similar sentiment:

"This is the way we did it when I was there. A writer is assigned a story, often a story he originally came up with himself, though not always. Two days are spent in the writers' room, with everyone helping flesh out the story, adding jokes, and so on. Then the writer writes an outline. Then everybody gets back in the room and pitches more changes, additions, and jokes. The writer writes the first draft, and then it's back to the room for more rewriting. The script is rewritten again after the read-through and after the screening of the animatic, with additional possible rewrites at the recording session itself and after the finished animation comes back from Korea. There might be other rewrites I've forgotten. If a joke survives all that, it's probably pretty good."

Author L.B. Gale explained five ways The Simpsons utilised language for both humour and philosophical musings during the "golden years of the show (pretty much the entire 90s run)": advertising comedy, interrogating language, highfalutin vocabulary usage, neologisms, and random moments of stream of consciousness.

=== End of the golden era ===
The consensus is that the show has been on a downhill slide for years. How many? That depends. No one would bat an eye at 10 years. Twelve? Ever since that episode when Principal Skinner turned out not to be the real Principal Skinner? For the record, "The Principal And The Pauper" aired all the way back in 1997, a low point in the otherwise solid ninth season.

— Kyle Ryan, Summarize The Simpsons in 10 episodes? That's unpossible! (But we try anyway), The A.V. Club

There are many definitions over when the "golden era" of The Simpsons actually ended. This is seen as "the trap that ensnares every discussion of The Simpsons, where ostensible fans end up debating when the show 'started to suck'". The end of the golden era (a noticeable decline in quality) is not the same as when the show stopped being enjoyable to watch. The general consensus is that by season 10 or 11, The Simpsons had definitely started to "suffer", "lose its mojo and become less consistent from week-to-week". Some critics point to season 7, as the point at which a noticeable decline in quality is observed, while others name season 9, season 10, and still others say The Simpsons golden era lasted from season 1 to season 10. Others exclude season 1 or both season 1 and season 2, as they argue The Simpsons had not yet found its unique style and was therefore a mixed bag. Vulture described the first two seasons as "wobbly overall, and surprisingly slow and quiet compared to most other seasons", and "practically King of the Hill compared with later seasons" respectively.

Viewpoints during the golden era episodes' original run were generally harsher and identified a dip in quality much earlier that what contemporary critics assign. Of season 9's "The Principal and the Pauper", The A.V. Club said, "For years, The Simpsons had enjoyed an enviable hit-to-miss ratio [but the episode] heralded an era of more misses and established a precedent for dramatically changing characters' storylines". Vulture.com said, "most viewers consider [the first 14 seasons of The Simpsons] the essential canon". In its ranking of these seasons, it listed 11–14 as the worst and 3–8 as the best. Its reviews for seasons 11–14 included: "heavy on very broad sight gags and light on memorable character bits", "pretty hit-and-miss...growing increasingly shameless, doing anything for a laugh", "the show's eventual descent into random weirdness isn't quite complete, but it's getting there", and "[it] produc[ed] one good to great episode for every couple of so-so ones". WhatCulture said "for some [the decline in quality] is from season 17 onwards".

The Simpsons "greatest episode" lists by both fans and staff always tend to heavily favor the earlier seasons, often having little to no post-golden-era episodes listed at all. The latest season to be represented is usually seven, eight, nine, ten, or eleven. In an 11 Best Simpsons Episodes of the 2000s list, (Note: The first episode of The Simpsons to air in the 2000s was season 11's "Little Big Mom", while the last was season 21's "O Brother, Where Bart Thou?".) the author notes, "pretty much every single episode that's in the discussion for 'Best Simpsons Ever' happened last decade". He added that "The list is...VERY early-2000s heavy... the most recent episode is one from 2006 (Note: Referring to the season 17 episode "The Seemingly Never-Ending Story") and most come from 2000-2003". (Note: Referring to various season 11 through 15 episodes) The Guardian article The Simpsons at 500: your top 10 episodes found it "interesting" and "surprising" that their list based on an opinion poll from their readership resulted in episodes from the first decade, (Note: Specifically, from seasons 2 through 8) and "only a handful [of the votes] given to...21st century [episodes]". When compiling a list, ranking the 11 Simpsons Christmas episodes from worst to best, author Sam Greenspan pointed out, "YES, I notice too that these basically go from newest episodes to oldest episodes. Just kinda happened that way". When ranking the first 20 seasons of The Simpsons, Chris Morgan of Splitsider filled the top ten slots with the first ten seasons (though not in chronological order).

David Bennun of The Guardian wrote, "The running joke about how [the show is] not as good as it used to be [is] true...The show has now been substandard for nearly as long as it was impossibly great" (approximately 10 years). He added that this sentiment is mirrored in complaints by Simpsons fans. Todd Leopold of CNN, in a 2009 article looking at its perceived decline, stated "for many fans [...] the glory days are long past."

In an article entitled In Search of The Last Classic Simpsons Episode, author Brandon said season 10's "Homer to the Max" and "They Saved Lisa's Brain", season 12's "Trilogy of Error", season 13's "I Am Furious (Yellow)", and season 14's "How I Spent My Strummer Vacation" were contenders for the latest episode that made him feel like he was "watching The Simpsons in their heyday".

=== The Simpsons vs. "Zombie Simpsons" ===
The whole question of whether The Simpsons should go off the air doesn't excite me, because it's moot. The Simpsons, which is to say the classic, worldview-defining show that provided me a memorable quote for pretty much every occasion in life, already went off the air. It had a great run–eight or ten years, depending who's counting, which is far, far longer than even most great TV shows maintain their greatness. It was replaced by a second Simpsons, which began around the late '90s, give or take. This was not as great a show, it was less focused on the Simpsons as a family unit, and in some ways wasn't even really a sitcom, so much as an institution, like Saturday Night Live, which became known for its famous guest cameos and its parodies and takes on topical issues. It was a lesser show, but that was fine; the world also needs comedies that are just often pretty funny, and to me its existence took nothing away from the preceding seasons.

— James Poniewozik, TV Weekend: The Simpsons At 500, Time Entertainment

Golden-era Simpsons and post-golden-era Simpsons are sometimes counted as two different series. This is because many believe that the two series are nominally the same program, but significantly distinct qualitatively. David Bennun of The Guardian was relieved after watching the show's opening sequence that debuted in 2009, (Note: As seen in the season 20 episode "Take My Life, Please") as it was "a long overdue acknowledgment that The Simpsons is not the show it was". He argues that despite the characters and setting remaining the same, "the decline in quality [is] painfully evident".

In consequence, the term "Zombie Simpsons" has been used by some fans of the show and media commentators alike to refer to the latter period, regarded as mediocre, meandering and has-been. Two other similar terms, "Jerkass Homer" and "Flanderization" (coined by fan-run online encyclopedia TV Tropes), have also appeared to refer to the perceived aggravation of Homer Simpson and Ned Flanders' respective characters, the first one from a well-meant but flawed and bumbling working class family man to an "invincible and totally self confident [...] evil doppelganger of the Homer that had originally been on the show", and the second one from a friendly and good-hearted religious next-door neighbor which heavily contrasted with Homer's antics and incompetence to the one of a stereotypical, dogmatic, evangelical "bible-thumping" prude.

While Entertainment Weekly gave The Simpsons a rating of "A−" in 1990, an "A" in 1993 and an "A+" in 1997 (and also gave various golden era season DVDs "A"s including the first, second, and eighth), as of 2012, EW has given The Simpsons as a whole a rating of "B−". WhatCulture says, "They may never return to their past glory, but Matt Groening can end The Simpsons and still leave them with dignity...and with an IMDB rating higher than 8."

=== Silver or bronze era ===
While accepting that the show either plateaued or declined in quality for about a decade, many critics such as ScreenJunkies argue that "'The Simpsons' are still on the creative upswing sinc[e] The Simpsons Movie". (Note: Originally released between seasons 18 and 19) Others argue that the improvement happened after the show's move to HD in 2009. According to IMDb ratings, season 23 saw a spike in quality after a relative slump at around 7.0 since season 13. During season 23, James Poniewozik of Time described the latest few seasons of The Simpsons as the show's "Silver – or Bronze – Era", saying "it's become more family-focused again, and is still capable of world-class episodes like the recent 'Holidays of Future Passed'. The Simpsons movie too, if you count that, stands up with most of the show's first-decade greatness".

The season 23 episodes "Holidays of Future Passed" and "The Book Job" have been highly praised, sometimes being described as on par or reminiscent of the show's golden era. Of the former, The A.V. Club said the show "found a sweet spot that combined a barrage of non-stop jokes with a tenderness often lacking in latter-day Simpsons episodes", and gave it an "A". Of the latter, TV Fanatic said "Wow. That might not have felt like a classic Simpsons episode, but it didn't matter because "The Book Job" was still one the strongest in the series' 23-year history". A season 24 Indiwire review said, "'The Simpsons' is no longer in its prime (though this season has shown marked signs of improvement over some of the other recent years)". Kate Reilly of Geekenstein said that season 24's "Moonshine River" was "certainly one of the most heartfelt episodes in recent years, and it makes good use of its established characters as a source of humor instead of resorting to random gag writing the way Family Guy often does".

Alex Strachan of the Calgary Herald said, in his review of season 23's "Treehouse of Horror XXII", "Forget all that talk about The Simpsons being past its prime. Based on tonight's sharp-eyed, keen-witted Treehouse of Horror XXII - funnier, faster and more fright-worthy than last year's dud, (Note: Referring to season 22's "Treehouse of Horror XXI") thankfully - there's a lot of ink left in the old ink pot yet." Matt Zoller Seitz of Vulture praised season 23 as "the strongest [season] in years; I'd stack it up against season eleven, maybe ten." Rob H. Dawson of TV Equals said season 24's "Hardly Kirk-ing" was "what I want late-period The Simpsons to be. It keeps itself together, plays off the larger extended universe of Springfield without seeming like a parade of "hey, I recognize that guy," and is, most importantly, entertaining." The site adds that the episode "keeps everything pretty tight, in therms [sic] of plotting", something which the show has struggled with in the past.

20 years of anything would get a little stale after a while, and that's a complaint that has been railed against the series for a number of years now. But last year, after the series' switch to hi-def, The Simpsons seemed reenergized. Season 21 continued to move the series in an upward trajectory, perhaps with its anniversary celebration reigniting some passion and creativity. [Seth Rogen and Evan Goldberg,] life-long fans of The Simpsons gave us a solid, funny episode that took its cues from Season 8 era Simpsons. They delivered a familiar feeling episode, but not one that felt like a retread. Leave it to a couple of talented fans to remind viewers what the series is capable of.

The two best episodes of the year...came in the season's second half. "The Squirt and The Whale"...like the best Simpsons episodes...delivered loads of laughs, while still effectively tugging at the heartstrings. And making a triumphant return to the series this year was Sideshow Bob in "The Bob Next Door." The last few Bob episodes have been the weakest of Kelsey Grammer's guest appearances, so it was great to have this episode return Bob to his evil self and deliver a smart and hilarious episode all in one fantastic half hour.

The lackluster episodes may have felt tired, but even they could supply a genius bit here and there. And the improved consistency of memorable episodes this season over years past proved that, even after 20 years, The Simpsons can still entertain.

— Robert Canning, The Simpsons: Season 21 Review, IGN

James Bone said that The Simpsons Movie "boasts the same sly cultural references and flashes of brilliance that have earned the television series a following that ranges from tots to comparative literature PhDs". Patrick Kolan believed that the film was "easily the best stuff to come [from the Simpsons] since season 12 or 13". When comparing the film to the early episodes of the show, Stephen Rowley concluded that the film "has more going for it than the show in its later years, but added that it was still a long way short of what made The Simpsons so invigorating". Ben Moore of Screen Rant said, "I don't even think it would be a bad idea to continue making Simpsons movies. At least then the creators could focus all their energy on making quality, as opposed to dividing comedic and creative energy...between episodes and movies."

Rick Broida of CNET described the 2012 mobile game The Simpsons: Tapped Out (Note: Originally released during season 23) as "surprisingly deep [and] frequently hilarious", adding that "it's better than anything that's been on the actual TV show in years. The 2007 video game The Simpsons Game (Note: Originally released during season 19) was praised for its writing, which lampooned the gaming industry and the show itself. Both GameSpot and GameTrailers said that the game delivered more than enough laughs to make it worth playing through at least once. IGN said, "The funniest episode of The Simpsons in years turns out to be a videogame". Brady MacDonald of the Los Angeles Times said the 2008 attraction The Simpsons Ride (Note: The attraction originally opened during season 19) "truly delivers — with loads of in-jokes and satire for serious fanatics and tons of thrills and fun for casual fans." Jay Cridlin of the St. Petersburg Times wrote that "the ride is packed with more original, funny material than you'd expect to see in a sitcom, much less a theme park." The Boston Globe's Tom Russo thought the 2012 short film The Longest Daycare was "a welcome throwback to the days when The Simpsons had more sentiment at its core, and wasn't so much about the latest batch of newbie Ivy League writers taking their cues from Family Guy."

== Arguments for and against decline in quality ==
=== Arguments for decline in quality ===
==== Guest stars and characterization ====
Jim Schembri of The Sydney Morning Herald attributed the decline in quality to an abandonment of character-driven storylines in favor of and overuse of celebrity cameo appearances and references to popular culture. Schembri wrote: "The central tragedy of The Simpsons is that it has gone from commanding attention to merely being attention seeking. It began by proving that cartoon characters don't have to be caricatures; they can be invested with real emotions. Now the show has in essence fermented into a limp parody of itself. Memorable story arcs have been sacrificed for the sake of celebrity walk-ons and punchline-hungry dialogue." Chris Suellentrop of Slate says one theory for the show's dip is "the show's many celebrity guest stars, which have made the show resemble those old Scooby Doo episodes where Sandy Duncan, or Tim Conway and Don Knotts, would show up just for the heck of it." Charles Kenny of Animation Anomaly said, "The latter [seasons'] emphasis on guest stars as the center of attention only highlights how subdued guest stars were in the earlier seasons; Tom Jones (Note: As seen in the season 4 episode "Marge Gets a Job") was a plot device not the plot itself."

John Ortved quotes Planet Simpson author Chris Turner, who said, "The show began to rely on gags, not characters. For example, Mr. Burns would show up, make his antiquated references and say a couple of evil things, but there wasn't the same robustness to those characters". Chris Suellentrop of Slate argues that "the Simpsons themselves, and the rest of the Springfield populace, have become empty vessels for one-liners and sight gags, just like the characters who inhabit other sitcoms". WhatCulture stated, "One of the main reasons why The Simpsons was such a success were because of their side characters. What on Earth happened to Professor Frink, Lindsay Neagle, Crazy Cat Lady, Gil Gunderson and many more? Either the creators have accidentally forgotten them or are just focusing on trying to squeeze out as much money from the more famous characters. That's not to say they do not always appear, they do sometimes appear but these appearances are not as constant as they used to be, and with that the laughs that they provided are not as constant as a consequence."

Dan Castalleneta explained that although he loved the character of Database and said his scenes "used to kill me", "for some reason the writers hate [him]", arguably the reason why he has been used much less in recent seasons. Though there has been some criticism of out-of-characterness in the show, Nancy Cartwright explains that when she or Yeardley Smith are given a line that sounds like something each other's characters would say, they discuss it and when the lines get changed they "are usually right". George Meyer said that "Homer acting crazy is like crystal meth: a little is good; too much is deadly". He added that the writing team used to have discussions over how mean Homer was allowed to be. He explained, "An early episode where we probably crossed the line was [season 3's] "When Flanders Failed". Homer was relentlessly malicious towards Ned; one of the writers said he was 'acting like a mean retard'".

==== Obsolescence ====
A quarter-century into its run, The Simpsons rarely comes up with the kind of brilliantly loopy storylines that sustained it through the '90s. What bothers me even more, though, is that a show that once had so many smart and original things to say about American culture has long seemed behind the times, its criticism mild and stale.

— Judy Berman, 'The Simpsons' Hipster Episode Was Everything That's Wrong With 'The Simpsons' Now, Flavorwire

Drew Grant of Salon.com says that "for awhile in the [2000s], Matt Groening's beloved cartoon had lost its place in the cultural dialogue. While Family Guy and South Park took center stage with their pop-relevancy, The Simpsons seemed content to die a slow death". TV Fanatic notes that "The Simpsons lacks the ability to respond to current cultural phenomena in a timely fashion", and says that South Park has overtaken them in this regard. John Ortved says that shows like South Park and Family Guy, which once sought inspiration from the show, are now overshadowing it with their own brand of "hilarity, subversiveness, and relevant social commentary that The Simpsons once did". As an example, he cites the season 16 episode "There's Something About Marrying", while described as "relevant and edgy", was in his opinion "a long-winded and lame exploration of the topic".

While David Bennun of The Guardian described a typical 1990s episode as having "immaculate narrative structure, emotional depth or roundedness of character", he spoke lowly of 2000s episodes, saying that they "generally lack[ed] continuity" and imitated its once-imitators like Family Guy by being "loud, erratic and contrived, [making] one laugh so intermittently that it's scarcely worth sitting through". After compiling a list of the 11 best episodes of the 2000s, Sam Greenspan stated, "I'm one of the biggest 'Simpsons' fans out there... yet as I was researching this list, reading over summaries of some of this decade's episodes, I didn't even recognize them". During season 23, Matt Zoller Seitz of Vulture said, "[The show] hasn't been a major cultural force in a decade or more, unless you count 2007's splendid The Simpsons Movie".

Cracked.com noted that Homer's job at the nuclear power plant was in response to "the rampaging atomic scare still very much alive after the Chernobyl and Three Mile Island disaster", yet 20 years down the track, he hasn't switched his job to "more relevant fuck-up careers, like dot-com CEO or investment banker--he was stuck in the gag job of incompetent nuclear technician even as nuclear power became safer and more efficient", so in that respect the show is still stuck in the 1990s. Dani Alexis Ryskamp writing for The Atlantic noted that the high-school-educated Homer's ability to support a family of five on a single income while owning a house and car, core features of the show's premise, bore little resemblance to reality by 2020.

==== Tameness ====
The A.V. Club argues that the show had begun to attempt to draw humor from making references to topics currently within public consciousness, but without providing any semblance of satire or critique, noting "too often, this show puts the Simpsons into a situation that references a movie or TV show without any sort of parodic angle" Darren Franich of PopWatch said that the "key to good referential rumor [is] it has to be motivated by something more than just a need to make a nod to pop culture". Robert David Sullivan from The A.V. Club gave the season 24 episode "Moonshine River" a C−, commenting, "...I have three criteria that a new episode can meet to be deemed watchable: Is there a coherent story? Does the episode make good use of the town of Springfield, one of the greatest mythological communities in all of fiction? And does the episode offer a smart take on some current cultural or political fad? To be clear, a 'yes' to just one of these questions would make the 508th or 509th episode worthwhile. 'Moonshine River' doesn't qualify on any count."

Charlie Sweatpants says Zombie Simpsons has a "remarkable inability to parody things beyond changing around a few letters has been brought up around here before", citing Mapple, (Note: As seen in season 20's "MyPods and Boomsticks") and adding this "isn't so much a parody as it is an advertisement". He compares the "gentle fluffing [of the Swapper Jack's store in season 23] with the unlimited contempt poured into the Monstromart in season 5's 'Homer and Apu'", saying that while the former "was born out of someone wandering into their favorite Trader Joe's and taking notes, Monstromart is mean". His conclusion is, "Zombie Simpsons shops at trendy stores and hangs out with cool people. The Simpsons laughs at things like that." Of season 23's "Treehouse of Horror XXII", Hayden Childs of The A.V. Club wrote, "The writers seem unwilling to mock the more outrageous aspects of the movies they are sending up and settle for weakly batting at the obvious", while CraveOnline's Blair Marnell commented that "in all honesty, it's amazing how tame 'The Simpsons' has become over the years. This show used to be the 'South Park' of its day. Now it's just showing its age and it's no longer the cool TV rebel that it used to be."

==== Zaniness and lack of emotional depth ====
By 2000, some long-term fans had become disillusioned with the show and pointed to its shift from character-driven plots to what they perceived as an overemphasis on zany antics. Chris Suellentrop of Slate wrote that "under [Mike] Scully's tenure, (Note: Referring to seasons 9 through 12) The Simpsons became, well, a cartoon. [...] Episodes that once would have ended with Homer and Marge bicycling into the sunset (Note: As seen in the season 4 episode "Duffless") now end with Homer blowing a tranquilizer dart into Marge's neck. (Note: As seen in the season 11 episode "It's a Mad, Mad, Mad, Mad Marge") The show's still funny, but it hasn't been touching in years." Mclean writer Chris Selley commented on the evolution from the loveable oaf to "the mean-spirited jokes [and] gruesome violence [of] 'Jerkass Homer'" throughout this time. In 2004, cast member Harry Shearer criticized what he perceived as the show's declining quality: "I rate the last three seasons (Note: Referring to seasons 13 through 15) as among the worst, so season four looks very good to me now." In response, cast member Dan Castellaneta stated "I don't agree, [...] I think Harry's issue is that the show isn't as grounded as it was in the first three or four seasons, that it's gotten crazy or a little more madcap. I think it organically changes to stay fresh."

Robert David Sullivan of The A.V. Club reviewed season 24's "Treehouse of Horror XXIII" saying, "In the early years of The Simpsons, the annual 'Treehouse Of Horror' outing was a fun contrast to most of the show's episodes. There was no warmth, no subtlety, no lessons learned, and no attempt at a coherent story—just a lot of gross-out humor and a chance to see Springfield stretched even further past reality. Now that entire show has adopted these qualities, the Halloween tradition doesn't seem as special." WhatCulture says, "The problem now is that The Simpsons are mostly too childish and sometimes very adult. The creators seem to have forgotten the aim of the game and constantly switch between audiences, leaving us, the poor audience confused as to what The Simpsons actually are." George Meyer stated, "If there's no grounding in reality, most people won't be interested. You'll only attract the comedy fanatics". He adds, "In general, I prefer the leisurely episodes with simple and involving stories to the frenetic episodes that assault you with disconnected jokes".

==== Repetition and staleness ====
In the late 1990s, around the airing of season ten, the tone and emphasis of the show began to change, and some critics started calling the show "tired". WhatCulture says, "With a show going on for more than two decades, it will obviously be hard to come up with new attractive stories and intelligent jokes and as a result, the creators seem to have lost that edge that they had in the 1990′s and early 2000′s". The A.V. Club article Summarize The Simpsons in 10 episodes? That's unpossible! (But we try anyway) says that the show's longevity has resulted in plot repetition and arguably a creative bankruptcy, noting that The Simpsons returned to New York in season 24 having last gone there in season 9, in season 22 Moe re-did his bar for the umpteenth time, and in the same season an episode revolved around a film based on the Angry Dad web series Bart created in season 13. It adds that Lisa-Homer and Homer-Marge episodes have been overdone, "the series has flashed forward... a handful of times", and "there have been 12 episodes about Sideshow Bob". The article later points out that "The Simpsons are going to ____________!" episodes have "become a familiar trope on The Simpsons", and says while this was done best in the season 6 episode "Bart vs. Australia", the formula has been done over and over again, with The Simpsons' international travels including, "Japan (season 10), Tanzania (season 12), Brazil (season 13), England (season 15), Sweden (season 15), China (season 16), Italy (season 17), India (season 17), Peru (season 20), Ireland (season 20), and Israel (season 21)".

Entertainment Weekly said "Even an optimist has to admit that the show has fallen back on far too many tropes: Homer gets a crazy job; a celebrity guest-star voices a character who's only funny because they're voiced by a celebrity; "The Simpsons are going to Delaware!"". The site also said that "change-of-venue episodes are typically uninspired", but adds that season 9 premiere The City of New York vs. Homer Simpson is the exception. John Ortved argues that the episodic status quo and floating timeline nature of the show may have been a factor in this "repetition and stalenness". Around 2003, Ian Maxtone-Graham said to The Independent, "I think we should pack it in soon and I think we will—we're running out of ideas," and Meyer said to MSNBC.com, "We're starting to see some glimmers of the end. ... It's certainly getting harder to come up with stories, no question."

In response to questions over the staleness and creative bankruptcy of the show, the article Summarize The Simpsons in 10 episodes? That's unpossible! (But we try anyway) suggests that the show's "re-covering [of] the same ground" into its twilight years is arguably "a necessity of The Simpsons' unprecedented longevity" Stroup has stated, "The worst thing [The Simpsons] could ever be accused of is the occasional lack of inspiration, which happens when you have an order of twenty-two episodes a year with no desire to repeat your twenty-plus years of content that led to the new one's existence. If the amount of episodes per season were reduced to fifteen, it could still be the best comedy on television". He adds that "the only thing that's kept them from holding their throne is the dire need for productivity, with a show that should be in a more exhausted state than it's actually in."

==== Gimmicks and jumping the shark ====
Some comment that the use of gimmicks are desperate attempts to overcome the staleness, and lead them to question how much creativity the long-running series can still have. Of the couch gag contest of Season 24, Geekenstein writer Kate Reilly says, "While it's not a bad idea it does make me wonder just how out of ideas they are for these things after doing more than 500 of them". On the relationship between Ned and Edna (Nedna) in season 23's "Ned 'n Edna's Blend Agenda", The A.V. Club writer Rowan Kaiser said that by "turning [Nedna] into a finale/voting gimmick, the show made it look like a desperate cry for relevance", and adds that "[the] relationship [should have] been allowed to develop more organically, away from the [cringeworthy] extra-textual bells and whistles". Some episodes have included shorts at the beginning or end. On the ending to season 24's "To Cur with Love", five episodes after the "Homer Votes 2012" short was added to "Adventures in Baby-Getting" the same season following its release as a solo short on Fox's YouTube channel, Robert David Sullivan of The A.V. Club said, "The episode is padded with another politics-related short". On season 24's "A Tree Grows in Springfield", Teresa Lopez of TV Fanatic said, "Perhaps the only disappointing part of the episode was the 'Logomania' cartoon at the end. When episodes run a little too short, the writers will tack on an unrelated short. It feels like an afterthought, and it would have been better to think of something to add to the original cartoon instead."

Colin Jacobsson of DVD Movie Guide wrote that The Simpsons trilogy episodes "tend to be pretty spotty." Writing for 411Mania, Ron Martin describes the episodes as being "just a lazy way out for the writers." DVD Talk's Casey Burchby wrote that most trilogy episodes do not work, and argued that they are an excuse for the series' writers to not have to come up with new stories for the characters. "It's understandable that after eleven years, a show might have trouble continuing to come up with original material for the same five characters, but the anthology episodes come across as rather transparent attempts to avoid that challenge", he wrote. Trilogy episodes like season 19's "Love, Springfieldian Style", season 12's "Simpsons Tall Tales", and season 13's "Tales from the Public Domain", as well as anthology episodes like season 20's "Four Great Women and a Manicure" and season 23's "Moe Goes From Rags to Riches" generally receive mixed to negative reviews. The season 13 clip show "Gump Roast" received overwhelmingly negative reviews from critics.

James Greene, Jr., author of the article Ten Times The Simpsons Jumped The Shark, says "Most television shows are only on air long enough to experience one tragic shark jump into stupidity, blandness, contradiction, or self-parody. Double-decade survivors like The Simpsons, however, have all the more time to betray the principles on which they were built." He lists the following episodes: season 21's "To Surveil with Love" (for the gimmicky "Tik Tok" intro sequence), season 16's "Homer and Ned's Hail Mary Pass" (for giving Comic Book Guy an unremarkable name reveal), "Gump Roast" (for being their fifth "archaic penny-saving" clip show), season 19's "All About Lisa" (for being identical to season 5's "Bart Gets Famous"), season 9's "The Principal and the Pauper" (for "inform[ing] us that the Principal Skinner we had come to know and love was an imposter"), season 15's "Co-Dependent's Day" (for "Homer [acting like a douche by] purposely framing...Marge for a DUI that almost proved fatal", season 14's "How I Spent My Strummer Vacation" (for shoehorning "big-name celeb cameos" into the episode), season 18's "24 Minutes" (for "[stinking] of cross promotion"), season 13's "The Frying Game" (for having a "truly stupid cop-out" to a "great murder mystery"), and season 19's "That '90s Show" (for being an "unforgivable 2008 retcon of Marge and Homer's youthful romance"). Greene says that the show "has always managed enough good episodes to keep us from giving up on the show entirely", which means "we still feel bruised every time the show's writers forget Homer and the gang's core values".

The season 12 episode "Homer vs. Dignity" was also derided for a scene in which Homer is implicitly raped by a panda in a zoo, with Johnny Dee of The Guardian suggesting that fans believe that the phrase "jumped the shark" should be replaced with "raped by a panda" to imply the shows decline in quality.

==== Writing ====
Jaime J. Weinman wrote in the 2007 article "The life and times of Homer J.(Vol. IV)" that his least favourite line of the series was "Just because you're a lesbian doesn't make you less of a bein'", from season 16's "There's Something About Marrying", adding, "A note to the writers: bad puns are not, in fact, meta-ironic commentaries on bad puns. They're just unfunny." Charlie Sweatpants of Dead Homer Society says, "What The Simpsons knew, and Zombie Simpsons has all but forgotten, is that in the right circumstances outrageous things are funnier when they are alluded to rather than jammed in your face." Robyn, a graduate student in literature, said that "It is impossible to watch an episode of The Simpsons...without having at least one joke (or situation) explained for you. [The writers] want to make sure the highest number of gags work for the highest number of audience members [because they] are afraid [their jokes] might be lost on younger (or stupider) viewers". She adds that she has "always poo pooed these kind of jokes as an insult to [her] intelligence, as a damper on the actually funny jokes, and as a comedy crutch". She continues her analysis by saying, "I especially can't stand the explanations that make reference-based jokes funny for everyone" and "I felt like they were much more successful 'jokes' because of what was left unsaid".

Steve Heisler of The A.V. Club also comments on this "overexplanation of jokes", arguing that it is one of the negative factors of the season 20 episode "Take My Life, Please" that wasn't helping matters." Ben Moore of Screen Rant makes the point that "Randomness ≠ comedy...regardless of how many times said random joke is made." Nancy Cartwright explained the quality of joke writing in 2011, "Sometimes [the table read] is so funny, all the writers are sitting there and writing it down so they don't forget. I think they each have their own scale of how to rate [the quality of jokes]". Dan Castellaneta explained the quality of script revising (he has written various scripts over the years and has sat in at writer's meetings), "with our show you couldn't be too disgruntled [with things being changed] because by and large everything [stayed the same or] got better and it very rarely got worse".

==== Plotting ====
I doubt that there's supposed to be a meta meaning to the title of this Valentine's Day-themed episode, but "splintered" accurately describes The Simpsons of late. Nearly a decade ago, Family Guy was the odd man out on Fox's animation slate, stressing cutaway gags and celebrity impressions while The Simpsons and King Of The Hill mined more humor from characters interacting in recognizably human ways. Now, Bob's Burgers is the Sunday-night misfit—not so much because it's realistic but because it gets laughs from committing to a premise and escalating it in unexpected ways. Meanwhile, The Simpsons joins Family Guy in quickly wringing obvious jokes from pop-culture references as it half-asses its way through a story.

— Robert David Sullivan, "Love Is A Many Splintered Thing" S24 / E12, The A.V. Club

Robert David Sullivan of The A.V. Club said of the season 24 episode "The Changing of the Guardian", "[it] is three mini Simpsons episodes: a comic portrayal of a natural disaster, a well-worn sitcom story with cameos from lots of recurring characters, and a brief tale in which our favorite family is threatened by the Guest Voice Of The Week", and added that "everything is so rushed that none of this feels sad or tense or heartwarming or funny." Of the season 20 premiere "Take My Life, Please", The A.V. Club reviewer Steve Heisler said, "the episode could have easily been just one thing...but instead, The Simpsons tries to do...three, one for each commercial break. The show has been around for 20 years; I would imagine that there would be plenty to mine from digging deep into a simpler story line for 19 minutes". He adds that the episode "crushes under the weight of its bloated plot". WhatCulture says, "Senseless plots are created in which the eyes of Springfieldians pop out and Bart notices a scar years after he gets it, leading to a senseless flashback. These stories do not fit the purpose of the Simpsons nor do they have the depth that would bring good tasteful jokes."

==== Animation ====
Conan O'Brien explains that "[Groening] didn't want The Simpsons to be a cartoon where Homer can run off a ledge like Wile E. Coyote and keep running. He wanted respect for the laws of gravity, the physical properties of the basic elements. I would run up against that sometimes. For example, you can't have Bart shoot Homer in the face with a shotgun and make Homer's face all black, and then have Homer be fine in the next scene. You can do it in a Halloween episode—you just can't do it in a normal episode." However, cartoony elements were often sneaked into the show (such as getting Leonard Nimoy to beam out at the end of season 4's "Marge vs. the Monorail").

The cartoony over-the-top nature of the show, embodied in the work of 'go-to' guy David Silverman (who animated, among other things, the scene where Homer goes crazy in season 6's "Treehouse of Horror V") have often been lauded. Silverman retired from most of his animating duties after season 8. WhatCulture explains that while originally "the animations were not phenomenal but never needed to be [because they] were good enough to show emotion...with advancements in technology and more usage of computer generated imagery [in order to improve the animation], The Simpsons on screen became more gimmicky and computer generated". It says that "that same feeling that we got back from the older seasons is lost by the usage of high-tech computer generated imagery" and that "over recent years there has been a gradual decline towards a sort of a Microsoft Paint direction."

==== Voice acting ====
Many fans and critics have noticed that in recent years, the "characters' voices sound slightly different than usual". In 2012, between seasons 23 and 24, WhatCulture said that "The Simpsons has been running for over two decades now and of course the voice actors are getting older and this has had an effect on the voices of the characters...but the problem...is that they have completely changed". It said "If I only listen to an episode, I won't be able to differentiate with certain side characters such as Moe or Chief Wiggum, they may be voiced by the same person but there was a time when there was a difference." Harry Shearer explained that, as opposed to later seasons, at the time of season 3's "Stark Raving Dad", the cast "did an additional read through before [they] started recording".

Though some have argued that the voice actors have become tired with the show and therefore put less effort into it these days, in 2010, during season 22, Castellaneta spoke about the quality of the cast. He said Julie Kavner has "a great work ethic...and it's been a pleasure working with her all these years", and that it's always been very easy to play off of her. He said Cartwright is "very energetic and enthusiastic about this show and always has been", and found it admirable that she is still playing a ten year old boy despite having a family. He said Yeardley Smith is a "terrific actress that can make anything funny...and find the humanity in it". Regarding Hank Azaria, Castellaneta told the publication he was "a very funny guy and he loves to improvise and play". He also commented that Harry Shearer is "one of the most brilliant satirists in the country", and said that his take on various media personalities has "served the show well". In an interview for TVLEGENDS, Cartwright's interviewer suggested that because she "separates [her]self from Bart and the show and just enjoys it as a [fan]", as opposed to some of her other work where she'll remember the filming process, she can "keep the show fresh after 24 years and still enjoy doing it". Nancy responded that "the show is just so darn good too...and so well done".

==== Money ====
Some argue that the creativity of the show has been stifled as its incredible success means the team can put anything on the screen and still make money. In regard to Jim Brooks' worries about The Simpsons becoming stale going into its seventeenth season, Garth Ancier dumbfoundedly said, "he still cared so much about it, and cared how good it is...here's someone who's done arguably the most profitable show in the history of television and [who] is still concerned that the quality isn't quite at the top of its game". John Ortved said that "if The Simpsons is something more than a brand, if its goals are about more than making money, then its creators should have retired it, triumphantly, some time ago".

=== Arguments against decline in quality ===
==== As good as ever ====
Week after week [the writers] are managing to find satire and new ways of kind of lambasting American culture. And the fact that the jokes are coming through the mouths of little yellow people gives them a lot of license to just be totally absurd.

— Editor Stacey Wilson, Hollywood Reporter Senior (quoted by John Blackstone, "The Simpsons": 500 episodes, still going strong, CBS News)

The Simpsons has managed to maintain a large viewership and attract new fans. While the first season enjoyed an average of 13.4 million viewers per episode in the U.S., the twenty-first season had an average of 7.2 million viewers. In an April 2006 interview, during season 17, Matt Groening said, "I honestly don't see any end in sight. I think it's possible that the show will become too financially cumbersome... but right now, the show is creatively, I think, as good or better than it's ever been. The animation is incredibly detailed and imaginative, and the stories do things that we haven't done before. So creatively there's no reason to quit." Author Douglas Coupland described claims of declining quality in the series as "hogwash", saying "The Simpsons hasn't fumbled the ball in fourteen years, it's hardly likely to fumble it now."

In 2004, Al Jean said "A good episode from Season 14 can be switched with one from Season 4 pretty interchangeably". In 2011, between seasons 22 and 23, Nancy Cartwright said, when asked how ad libs affect the script, the final show becomes such a mix of the two that it's hard to remember where the elements originally came from, and adds, "I'll watch the show 8 or 9 months [after voice recording] [and] all I know is I'm lovin' it and it's funny still and we got a hit". In 2012, between seasons 23 and 24, Jay Kogen said, "The show is still amazing. Makes me consistently laugh. Shocking it's still so good." Entertainment Weekly said in 2012, between seasons 23 and 24, that "The Simpsons remains one of the most beloved shows in the history of TV. Like all comedy legends, The Simpsons should be remembered for its greatest moments, biggest laughs, and contributions to pop culture history." After naming the show as the greatest animated TV series, IGN said during season 20, "It can be argued that even with a dip in quality from the early seasons, The Simpsons remains an entertaining and relevant series, and after two decades stays accessible to both the original fans and a whole new generation of viewers."

The 2012 Vulture article Nine Latter-Day Simpsons Episodes That Match Up to the Early Classics listed episodes ranging from season 13 to 23. The author, Matt Zoller Seitz, says it "prove[s] that while The Simpsons can't reinvent TV forever, it can still make us laugh". In a list of 10 of "the most memorable episodes that have been drawn to life over the years", BBC News included season 17 episode "The Monkey Suit", the latest episode after 8th season episode "The Itchy & Scratchy & Poochie Show". It said the episode, about the issue of evolution being taught in schools, "shows the writers still have fire in their bellies". John Ortved's 2007 top ten list for funniest Simpsons episode included season 15's "The President Wore Pearls", of which he said "It may seem ludicrous to include anything later than Season 8 in this list, but this one is brilliant. The musical numbers are astoundingly good, and Lisa's comeuppance is so well constructed it harkens back to the golden years of the show". In Top 10: Simpsons Episodes by AskMen, the only honourable mention was to the season 14 episode "How I Spent My Strummer Vacation". In the context of the article, which aims to list the episodes which "best demonstrate why the Simpsons are television icons", this pick "showcas[ed] the series' ability to land A-list talent". The episode was also the most recent one in Entertainment Weekly's top 25 list The Family Dynamic, with the article saying "You've gotta admire a show that lands the greatest names in rock and then gives them as much respect as a brown M&M."

I love The Simpsons. I'm very grateful to have had The Simpsons a part of my entire conscious life so far, and with the great number of episodes, I can safely say that they will always be a huge part of my leisure time activities, a constant inspiration, and something to look foward [sic] to. This is why I still watch the show, but not the only reason. I still think it offers high quality, funny, and intelligent entertainment. It just flat-out knows more than the average show, and it somehow communicates that without being pretentious...The fact is: The Simpsons has always been a dense, intelligent, and surprising show, with a huge heart and the finest sense of humor around. The writers know this, and I'm convinced that this awareness drives their writing decisions. That doesn't mean it always works, but there's a steady attempt made. The show is story-oriented—which puts them at a disadvantage in this commercial-heavy, YouTube-centric country we live in—and I believe that their shrinking ratings is merely placing them at the niche spot they always meant to occupy.

— Jared Stroup, The Simpsons: Season 24, Part 1 of 3, The Man in The Movie Hat

An article in The Guardian over "10 reasons to celebrate the genius of The Simpsons" cited the chalkboard gag from season 12 episode "Hungry Hungry Homer", "Temptation Island was not a sleazy piece of crap", as an example of how the show has cheekily undermined the FOX network over the years through in jokes, plus other "Blackboard favourites" from season 11 and 12. When discussing the impact of The Simpsons guest stars, it mentions guest starring roles from season 15, 17, and 22. It adds that "this series has loved its cultural references over an interesting 23 years".

Many of the show's staff have argued that the very nature of the show gives it durability, meaning they can uphold quality indefinitely. In a 1999 interview for Pioneer Press anticipating the premiere of season 11, Matt Groening said that "It would be tough to pull off that kind of longevity in live-action...In animation, at least the characters don't grow old. Animation lends itself to novelty and surprise". George Meyer added, "It is a huge advantage. There are just so many areas that we can delve into...Cost is never a factor. If we want them to go to the Great Wall of China for a quick joke, we can do it and it won't cost $100,000". Meyer also commented on the unique status The Simpsons has in regard to interference from FOX, "The fact that the network doesn't give us notes is enormously liberating...We don't have to appease them. We get to get some really bizarre stories past the American network".

==== Fewer and farther between ====
Some argue that The Simpsons has always had golden era-quality episodes, but that nowadays they are now fewer and farther between mediocre ones. IGN says "The Simpsons may have peaked in the [19]90s, but that doesn't mean the eight years since haven't delivered their share of quality episodes", and cites season twelve's "Trilogy of Error" as an episode which is "very funny...packed tight with sight gags and pop culture jokes [which] are woven together". The article 11 Best Simpsons Episodes of the 2000s notes: "While this decade is clearly the post-golden age era of 'The Simpsons'... it's still managed to produce some absolute classics". Popwatch.com writer Aly Semigran said of the series, "Sure, the golden era of The Simpsons is long gone. But the [show] has still has its moments of being the funny, star-filled ([season 23] alone has featured guest stars like Lady Gaga, (Note: As seen in the season 23 episode "Lisa Goes Gaga") Bryan Cranston, (Note: As seen in the season 23 episode "The Spy Who Learned Me") and Kiefer Sutherland) (Note: As seen in the season 23 episode "The Falcon and the D'ohman") and unconventional (how about that Banksy opener?) (Note: Banksy guest animated the opening sequence's "couch gag" of the season 22 episode "MoneyBart".) show we've all loved — and quoted — for the past 23 years of our lives".

In a review of season 24's "Treehouse of Horror XXIII", Robert David Sullivan of The A.V. Club wrote that "like the couch gag at the start of each episode, 'Treehouse Of Horror' tempts us with the chance to see something that doesn't feel borrowed (and a bit dumbed down) from the show's glory years". He adds that the "'couch gags' that open The Simpsons are now consistently the most enjoyable part of the show. During [seasons 22 and 23], the extended opening scenes by guest animators Banksy and Bill Plympton (Note: At the time of Sullivan's review, Plympton guest animated the opening sequence "couch gag" of the season 23 episode "Beware My Cheating Bart".) were more talked-about than any episode itself". Robert Canning of IGN said that if The Simpsons managed to make it that far, he thinks that "even the 40th season would have a classic episode or two"

While acknowledging that by the end of the golden era, the great The Simpsons episodes became few and far between, the IGN article The Simpsons: 20 Seasons, 20 Episodes names the episodes "The City of New York vs. Homer Simpson", "Mayored to the Mob", "Missionary: Impossible", "Trilogy of Error", "Half-Decent Proposal", "Special Edna", "The Regina Monologues", "The Father, the Son, and the Holy Guest Star", "My Fair Laddy", "24 Minutes", "Eternal Moonshine of the Simpson Mind", and "How the Test Was Won" as the best of their respective seasons (seasons 9 through 20). It gives almost all of them high praise, saying things like: "though much of Season Eighteen was quite mediocre, "24 Minutes" ranks up there with the best of all time", "'My Fair Laddy'...serves as an example that even in its seventeenth season The Simpsons continues to produce high-quality episodes", and "With [season 16's "The Father, the Son, and the Holy Guest Star"'s] daring story, we can't help but remember back when The Simpsons was an edgy hip show that would frequently shed a light on cultural complexities. Please give us more episodes like this!".

Matt Zoller Seitz of Vulture notes, "After spending the last week watching most of seasons 15 through 23 — which aired after I'd lost interest and pretty much checked out — I must formally withdraw my "should've packed it in" verdict. The post-2000 seasons are uneven, often weak, but there are flashes of greatness, too." He says, "season nineteen's "Any Given Sundance", should be required viewing in film schools, season-sixteen episode "All's Fair in Oven War" has one of my favorite Bart-and-Milhouse subplots, and the annual Halloween "Treehouse of Horror" anthologies have been especially strong".

Adam Frucci of Splitsider explains that "March 2001, after a long hiatus, I sat down to watch The Simpsons. It was [season 12's] "Bye Bye Nerdie"...Compared to any random entry from Season Four or Five, no, it doesn't measure up. But being a former superfan, having signed off on the show and asserting it would never be the same, something clicked. I was laughing. Hard". This episode, which had "amazing gags from the A-story", rejuvenated his love for The Simpsons. He adds that while he has "been burned countless times since then...that episode made [him] look at the series in a brand new light [by allowing him to] accept...the fact that it's never going to be like how it was in '93, but what's left can still be pretty good". Stroup says that "every season has at least a couple weak episodes that somebody catches and decides their entire opinion of the state of the series", and explains that the opposite happens too. He does notice that there are more bad apples than classics, and has noticed a shift in quality. He says, "I'm not saying it's as good as it's always been—I'm completely in agreement that their best run was during the nineties—but it's far from bad and always watchable."

==== Stunt episodes ====
Many argue that the show can only be good through stunt episodes – those that mess with the narrative structure such as season 19's "Eternal Moonshine of the Simpson Mind" or season 17's "The Seemingly Neverending Story", in attempts to bypass the staleness of the series. The A.V. Club notes that "when these episodes miss the mark, it shows the strain of the writers grasping for something different. When they work, they seem like natural extensions of the Simpsons world". Season 23's "Holidays of Future Passed" took place in the future allowing for ingenuity and creativity. Season 12's "Trilogy of Error" had a unique storytelling style. Season 23's "The Book Job" was mostly a heist episode. Season 11's "Behind the Laughter" was a mockumentary, "completely shatter[ing] the normal formula of a Simpsons episode. Season 18's "24 Minutes" shows "the seamless integration of [the] Springfield residents into the recognizable 24 formula".

The A.V. Club describes how season 23's "How I Wet Your Mother" might have turned out if it did not follow a unique structure, thereby turning a "fun Inception parody" into a "typical latter-day Simpsons episode [which would have] proceed[ed] according to the standardized episodic rules: Homer wets the bed because he feels guilty about getting away with something while all of his co-workers were punished, but he refuses to apologize until he has a chance meeting with guest star Sarah Silverman, at which point his bedwetting stops. In the meantime, lots of random crap and a poignant B-plot featuring Disco Stu and Bumblebee Man". In an 11 Best Simpsons Episodes of the 2000s list, "The Seemingly Never Ending Story" was placed third, with the author commenting that it "just edged out "Trilogy of Error" as the cleverest unique gimmick episode of the decade". He notes that "as 'The Simpsons' seemed to run short on great stories to tell, the gimmicky episodes began to get stronger and stronger". DVD Movie Guide said both "the series usually pulls of [sic] the Halloween ones relatively well" and "even in the series' crummier seasons, the staff always seems to come up with a good Halloween episode".

==== Simpsons purists ====
When people nitpick and say, "That wasn't a very good season", I want to go, "No, it wasn't the best season. But it was still the best thing on TV that year." It's the only thing I'm a real nerd over. The greatest thing about The Simpsons is the warmth of the family. It's such a beautiful, dysfunctional family. I loved Bush saying: "We need families more like the Waltons, less like the Simpsons." Well, maybe you do, but it's not going to happen, and I'm not even sure that he's right about The Simpsons anyway. Whatever happens in all Homer's crazy schemes, his ignorance, all those things, they never compromise his absolute love for his family. It always comes back to that.

— Ricky Gervais

The notion of Simpsons purists is used as a defense against the negative response given to newer Simpsons episodes. The theory follows that purists are so caught up in the golden era of The Simpsons that they now consider all old episodes good and all new episodes bad, just because of when they were made. Despite giving the season 24 premiere "Moonshine River" a positive review by saying, "there was plenty in the episode that resembled shades of The Simpsons of old: there was Milhouse's unrelenting love for Lisa; smart pop culture reference, in-jokes and well-done guest spots", Hollywood.com reviewer Aly Semigran admitted to being an "obnoxious Simpsons purist", always seeing modern Simpsons as "less lovable [and] relatable" than its "timeless" cousins. She wrote, "I'm one of those fans of The Simpsons. You know the kind. Always crying about how the glory days of The Simpsons...are long gone, and that the newer episodes are a crude shell of a once great and brilliant show. I had to stop watching years ago when the characters and the overall feel of the show became not only unrecognizable, but borderline unlikable". She describes this as a "snobby early-era Simpsons stigma [she has] attached to the show and its newcomer fans". In a Popwatch.com article, Aly Semigran says "like so many other purist Simpsons nerds such as myself, we bid the series adieu — at least the obsessive, pick-up-on-every-small-detail aspect of it — a few years ago". This suggests that some purists may hold the view that new episodes are bad without having watched them.

Geekenstein writer Kate Reilly's musings of "Moonshine River" "got [her] thinking about how silly the whole 'When Did The Simpsons Become Shit OMG LOL' camp really is". She argues that "Sure, the series will probably never hit the same highs it did in the [19]90s, and we've certainly had some truly awful strings of episodes at times, but I think just drawing an arbitrary line in the sand and saying nothing beyond that point is worthwhile is really quite ignorant. Not every episode is a gem, but post-movie things have improved dramatically and there's still a solid half hour of entertainment to be found with America's favorite family". Stroup notes, "the show has been around so long that everybody has an opinion of it—be it rash or devoted—and it makes for some questionable opinions of what I regard as The Great American Satire". Matt Zoller Seitz of Vulture says you can't generalise about the quality of periods of the show's history because "the kaleidoscopic parade of The Simpsons will stomp it flat". He adds that "Early in the show's run we rated episodes. Now we rate seasons. In seven years, we'll be rating decades".

== Fairness of comparison ==
An incredible anxiety of influence hovers over Simpsons writers, who realize that they are judged not by the standards of network television, but by the standards of their own show's golden age. By the end of his tenure as executive producer, Scully was making nervous statements to the press like, "Basically, my goal is just not to wreck the show" and, "Yeah, we don't want to be the guys that, you know, sank the ship." Maybe The Simpsons is killing The Simpsons by setting expectations too high.

— Chris Suellentrop, The Simpsons: Who turned America's best TV show into a cartoon?, Slate

In 2003, during season 14, Chris Suellentrop of Slate wrote, "At some point during its 14-year run, The Simpsons turned into one of the best sitcoms on television", and yet says this is not a compliment because before then it was so much more, "America's best TV show". He says that "There's still greatness there, and you get to see a home run now and then, but mostly it's a halo of reflected glory." In 2007, Matt Groening said, "You always hear that the show isn't as good as it used to be ... But people always compare the new shown to the memories of their favourite episodes, back when the show surprised them. You've got to have an open mind, and for some people, it's impossible. Nostalgia clouds their thinking". When asked in 2007, during season 18, how the series' longevity is sustained, Scully joked, "Lower your quality standards. Once you've done that you can go on forever."

John Ortved points out that there has always been negative criticism of The Simpsons, even during the period that came to be regarded as the show's golden age. In season 5, a reviewer writing in the Los Angeles Times said, "Lately...there are no layers. What you immediately see and hear is everything you get. The show's bratty Bart and once bankable Homer humor are flatter, and gags often laboured and belaboured, and the characters inconsistant". The early seasons of The Simpsons, which were later reassessed and praised, were originally looked down upon by many media outlets. Former United States drug czar William Bennett, after "spying a Bart poster at a drug rehabilitation center", said "Your guys aren't watching 'The Simpsons', are you? That's not going to help you", despite having "never actually seen the show". Also, "a few humorless educators" objected Simpsons- (especially Bart-) related merchandise, due to their anti-establishment philosophy being seen as a bad influence, despite The Simpsons actually subverting negative ideas, like in an episode where Homer says "Being popular is the most important thing in the world", and where the episode's moral is "the opposite lesson".

In 2012, during season 23, Matt Zoller Seitz of Vulture wrote, "By now, the series has sunk its roots so deep into the popular imagination that we tend to forget it was once considered déclassé, maybe even dangerous." He adds that, "Twenty years ago, Evangelists and politicians denounced The Simpsons as a televised toxin that weakened parental authority and coarsened the culture. They blasted the clan as a disgusting, dysfunctional unit that was unfit to anchor a prime-time cartoon", noting the famous quote made by President George H. W. Bush during his 1992 reelection campaign: "a lot more like the Waltons and a lot less like the Simpsons". He adds that when he wrote an "unflattering story" about the show, "A reader who liked the later seasons argued that the problem wasn't The Simpsons but unrealistic expectations plus bottomless hunger for "the new and shiny."", citing a line Lisa says in "The Itchy & Scratchy & Poochie Show": "The thing is, there's not really anything wrong with the Itchy & Scratchy show. It's as good as ever. But after so many years, the characters just can't have the same impact they once had". John Ortved writes that this poignant foreshadow is now "a tongue-in-cheek rebuttal to everyone who claimed that the quality of The Simpsons had declined over the years". The show other scapegoat to evade questions of quality is the line Bart uses to answer Comic Book Guy when "he says he feels like the show owes him something for being a loyal viewer", which is "What? They've given you thousands of hours of entertainment for free! What could they possibly owe you? I mean, if anything, you owe them!", has also been used by the show as an answer to issues of lower quality.

The 11 Points article "11 Best Simpsons Episodes of the 2000s" notes that "even a past-its-prime 'Simpsons' is still better than 99 percent of the other stuff on TV". Seth MacFarlane mimics this view by saying, "it is still funnier than any live-action show that's on television right now". In a 2003 article, writers of Entertainment Weekly listed season 11's "Bart to the Future" as the worst Simpsons episode of all time. They elaborated that "Choosing the lamest Simpsons episode is like picking the crowning installment of Shasta McNasty — it's all relative. So while 'Bart to the Future' was likely better than anything else on TV the week it first aired, even Mojo the monkey could've banged out a more inventive script [...] Plus, the whole looking-into-the-future premise is merely reliving past glory, carried out far more successfully in [season 6's] 'Lisa's Wedding.'" Matt Zoller Seitz of Vulture says, "it's unfair to expect each and every season to match the show's glory years, which produced some of the best ... comedy ... ever." In 2010, during season 21, Martin Felipe of BoxOfficeProphets said that for a 21 year old show, "to be at the [quality] level it's still at is bordering on miraculous". He says that while 1990s Simpsons are in the A range [and among the best shows of all time], the more recent offerings still merit a B at worst".

== Relevance of program quality ==
Regardless of how the new episodes compare to the golden era, many people want the series to continue, or argue that the show will continue. The Marquee Blog likens The Simpsons to an old buddy from school: "You were once great friends (fans), but now you only occasionally keep in touch to talk about the old days, and will sometimes look for updates on Facebook. Nonetheless, it's a constant background presence that I can't imagine being without". While acknowledging a quality dip, Popwatch.com writer Aly Semigran says, "Me get through life without The Simpsons? That's unpossible!". Stroup says that for some, "the day [The Simpsons] ends will be a funeral for a dear friend". Stroup says "I acknowledge the show's relative lack of edge, and the stale aroma the occasional episode leaves, but, when it comes down to it, I just love watching these characters do anything. Anything new, anything familiar, anything uninspired, anything brilliant, the only thing I ever ask of the writers and animators is that I have a reason to revisit it [and] they've yet to let me down in that regard". He adds that "even the recycled stories don't deter [him] from a second or third screening, and [he] always find[s] something that eluded [him] the first time.

Charles Kenny of Animation Anomaly argues that The Simpsons' "ultimate demise will contribute to the collapse of the dominance of animation on FOX". He argues that this is due to 5 main reasons. Firstly, "without the weekly reminder [the brand recognition] market is sure to suffer a bit [and while] re-runs remind viewers of the show's existence, they tend to remind them of good times, not encourage them to buy new products". Secondly, "The Simpsons as a brand has phenomenal loyalty [and] once the series ends...that loyalty will begin to (slowly) disappear. People will remain loyal and devoted, but the majority of fans will move on to other shows, or their tastes will change as they get older. Before you know it, all that will be left is a smattering of hardcore fans who hold on to the glory days and maintain that nothing will ever top their faith in a show from the 90s."

Thirdly, there is an "Inability to replace it" - "Family Guy is perhaps the closest the network has come but since it returned from hiatus a few years ago, it is nowhere near what it used to be and currently attracts a far more narrow demographic than the Simpsons did at its height. The same goes for the other McFarlane children, they all share similar traits that prohibit them from ever reaching the largest audience possible." Fourthly, "The Simpsons remains a very well written show. Especially in light of all the other "sitcoms" and "comedies" that the various networks put out during the week". Fifthly, "The Simpsons could never be repeated because FOX as a network has changed. When the Simpsons were first broadcast, the creators were given a wide berth when it came to content and biting the hand that feeds them. Since then, FOX has become successful, and much more mainstream as a result. I can't foresee a show being given similar leeway."

WhatCulture argues that "Matt Groening should finally end The Simpsons, there's no reason to wait for one of the main actors to die first". Cartwright acknowledges that no matter how much entitlement she may feel to the characters she plays, they are copyrighted by FOX.

== Responses from staff members ==
Throughout the history of the show, the decline in quality has been associated with various members of The Simpsons team. As such, the showrunners Al Jean and Mike Scully, writers Ian Maxtone-Graham and Matt Selman, as well as series creator Matt Groening, often receive the brunt of the blame by both fans and critics for the show's supposed decrease in quality, while the departure of various others staff members are seen as the reason due to their importance to the style and tone of the show. Chris Suellentrop of Slate said "Some of the die-hard fans who populate the news group alt.tv.simpsons have settled on a "lone gunman" theory—that one man single-handedly brought down TV's Camelot."

Charlie Sweatpants notes that "As part of the original contract...The Simpsons had total immunity from network interference. The only people who were allowed to decide what happens in Springfield were the ones in the writers' room. That freedom allowed the show to become what it was, but it also concentrated enormous responsibility on the ever changing writing staff. Whatever they came up with was what got animated and ended up on screens all over the world. So while the protection from management interference gave the show unprecedented creative freedom, it also meant that any disruptions among the writing staff would have enormous effects on the quality of the show. For good and ill, The Simpsons was entirely its own creation". Describing where The Simpsons voice and humour comes from, Conan O'Brien said, "You've got Matt Groening; he's very much this countercultural voice. You have Sam Simon. You've got this Lampoon influence, whatever that means; I've never really understood what that means, but it's there. There is a strong lack of sentimentality on The Simpsons, but something that Sam and Jim [Brooks] and Matt stressed was: this is a family." Therefore, arguably the less these influences had to do the with the show, the less focused the show got.

=== Matt Groening ===
It is arguable how much influence Matt Groening has had in the creative process over the years. In general, while early Simpsons-related media give Groening most of the praise for the series, more recent reassessments have highlighted the work of others and have questioned what role he has played. For example, Ortved says the real talents and creative forces of the show are Sam Simon and James L. Brooks. According to some testimonies in the book The Simpsons: An Uncensored, Unauthorized History, he is essentially the creator and nothing more. In 2007, Groening said "I'm one of those people who gets more credit than I deserve ... So do I feel guilty? Yes. Do I admit it? Yes. And then I move on".

David Bennun of The Guardian has suggested as a reason for the dip on quality Groening diverting his attention to his other show Futurama. In 2012, Jay Kogen said, "Matt is a great great guy. Smart and funny. He helped shape the tone of the show and gave some of the details that gave the world its 'reality.' He and Sam Simon really tried to make the show smart and interesting and its own unique thing." In 2011, Nancy Cartwright explained that "Matt still comes to the table reads and has his input". In 1990, Entertainment Weekly said "As a cartoonist who's primarily a writer, Matt Groening is the reason the Fox network's The Simpsons...is such an enjoyable show. Groening has created a group of characters whose personalities and motives are more vivid and detailed than the vast majority of sitcoms featuring flesh-and-blood actors...It's because Groening has invested Bart — and all the other Simpsons, for that matter-with a sensitive, vulnerable side that most sitcoms with human beings lack."

=== Mike Scully ===
A television comedy, more often than not, arises from the collective, at times antagonistic labor of a bunch of writers in a room. It is easy enough to identify the graphic style and populist sensibilities of Matt Groening, and to intuit the sharp, fuzzy humanism of James L. Brooks. But over the years dozens of writers have passed through the bungalows on the Fox lot where "The Simpsons" is written. Many have stuck around, come back after grazing elsewhere or left traces of their influence behind. They are, as a group, responsible for the show's variety and its consistency, for its high points and its occasional doldrums.

— A. O. Scott, The Simpsons Movie (2007), The New York Times

Mike Scully, who was showrunner during seasons nine through twelve, has been the subject of criticism. His seasons have been described as "too silly" to "nefarious". Various 'low-points' of the series have occurred during his tenure, such as the death of Maude Flanders. Other changes in the tone of the show was an "elevation in cartoonish behavior", a stretched "rubber band reality", and a "heav[y reliance] on gags and cameos". Because of this, many consider him as the person who "ruin[ed] what was a lot of people's favorite show when he took over".

Jared Stroup of the Man in the Movie Hat, however argues that "his episodes are consistently among the funniest episodes The Simpsons ever produced, and, though there's often a reliance on laughs over competent storytelling, the episodes have aged well in many ways". Chris Suellentrop of Slate argues that "under Scully's tenure, The Simpsons became, well, a cartoon". He quotes what he views as a confession that Scully gave to The New York Times Magazine, "much of the humanity has leached out of the show over the years. ... It hurts to watch it, even if I helped do it." However, he added, "A show like The Simpsons is the product of so many creative individuals that it's difficult to blame one person—even Scully, the onetime executive producer—for anything."

=== Ian Maxtone-Graham ===
Chris Suellentrop of Slate argues that some fans target writer Ian Maxtone-Graham, saying that he and Scully, "both of whom joined the show after it had already been on the air for several seasons", are cited as evidence that "The Simpsons lost touch with what made it popular in the beginning—Matt Groening's and James L. Brooks' conception of an animated TV family that was more realistic than the live-action Huxtables and Keatons and Seavers who populated 1980s television". Suellentrop added, "It would be nice to finger Maxtone-Graham, who gave a jaw-dropping interview to London's Independent in 1998. In it, he admitted to hardly ever watching The Simpsons before he joined the staff in 1995, to brazenly flouting Groening's rules for the show (including saying he "loved" an episode that Groening had his name removed from), and to open disdain for fans, saying, "Go figure! That's why they're on the Internet and we're writing the show." But just because Maxtone-Graham is a jerk (or at the very least, shows colossally bad judgment in front of an interviewer) doesn't mean he's a bad writer."

=== Al Jean ===
Al Jean, showrunner from Season 13 to 32, has also been the subject of criticism, with many believing that the show continued to decline under his tenure. John Ortved wrote that the "lack of any new direction from [the current] showrunner", namely Al Jean (who has held the position from season 13 to 24), may have "ended up limiting the series' potential". He adds however that although Jean was showrunner "over the show's worst years", it is unfair to give him sole blame for the show's decline, as it is a dynamic show with many collaborators. He adds though that he must take some blame as he has remained showrunner for over ten years, whilst in the first decade of the show the showrunners change every two years to keep things fresh. In his defense, Jean has pointed out that he was co-showrunner with Mike Reiss from 1991 to 1993, consisting of some of the shows greatest seasons.

Jared Stroup of the Man in the Movie Hat says "no matter how classy Jean's run has been, nor how steadily he's sustained the show's intelligence and quality (at least attempted quality), the show has suffered the worst ratings and reviews during his tenure", and adds "In retrospect, he seemed to run out of gas around season eighteen, and should've promptly been replaced to freshen up the series". In a review for the first part of season 24, Stroup pointed out that Jean's position is "a big task—might be the biggest task on television, if you think about it—and Jean deserves to be appreciated more than he is." Stroup accredits Jean with turning "the "couch gag" into a work of art" and using an "impressive song selection to accompany scenes and moments in a near avant-garde way." He adds "You might disagree with him, but if there's one thing Al Jean knows, it's what The Simpsons is. He played an integral role in creating that definition after all." In a review for Penny-Wiseguys, Stroup said the episode is "a perfect example of the weird places the show has gone under the Jean tenure, but there's something simultaneously worrisome and exciting about how bizarre this episode is".

=== Matt Selman ===
Stroup says that "Jean's reign finally came to an end [in Season 23] when Matt Selman ran three episodes [The Food Wife, The Book Job and A Totally Fun Thing That Bart Will Never Do Again]", and analysed his contribution with, "And guess what? They were not only three of the best installments of the season, but they were among the best of the past decade". He added that Selman "showcased a freshness and youthful exuberance that hadn't been seen from Jean in years", and that "Selman is precisely the new life the show needs: he's "new TV", whereas Jean is very much "old TV"". He concludes by saying "Selman is precisely the new life the show needs...If he were to takeover, I guarantee you'll start hearing about how great The Simpsons is again".

=== Others ===
John Ortved explains that while in its early days, the show had a writing dream team (which had a very high standard, allowed them feed off each other, and was also in a very chilled environment), nowadays there are two separate writing rooms and writing is done in a more office-like environment. Chris Suellentrop of Slate suggests a too many cooks theory, citing George Meyer's interview with MSNBC.com: "We have more writers now. In the early days, I think, more of the show, more of the episode was already in the first draft of the script. Now there's more room-writing that goes on, and so I think there's been a kind of homogenization of the scripts...Certainly, the shows are more jokey than they used to be. But I think they also lack the individual flavor that they had in the early years." Stroup says, "no matter how many new writers join the staff, I always give the management the benefit of high standards and accept that they belong there", due to their work making him feel happy to revisit the world of The Simpsons. Jay Kogen said, ""I keep reading books about Star Trek where [creator] Gene Roddenberry was not the guy who was necessarily at the head of it, or the stuff about The Godfather, where it's Coppola and it's a bunch of other people. It turns out that what they say about TV and movies being a collaborative effort is really true. It's a large collaboration. But those are hard stories to tell for the press. They like to make stars out of people, so they pick one guy and say, 'This guy's the guy who did it.' And that's a pretty good story.""

Sweatpants says that the decline in writing occurred "because there was a quick departure of several important writers" after season 8, adding that "by Season 12, the writing staff was almost entirely newcomers with just a few die hards remaining". Fans either cite the departure of one writer as the moment the show worsened, or comment on the general notion of the show losing its collection of great writing talent. In 2003, Chris Suellentrop of Slate said that some "think the problem is the show's brain drain: Long-absent individuals include creators Groening and Brooks, actor Phil Hartman, and writers Al Jean and Mike Reiss (who both left briefly to do The Critic), Greg Daniels (still doing King of the Hill), and Conan O'Brien (who has been linked to the show's decline so many times that Groening once called the theory "one of the most annoying nut posts" on the Internet)".

A lot of the dream team was reassembled for the 2007 film, though according to some accounts, such as those in The Simpsons: An Uncensored, Unauthorized History, it was not the same as it once was, with returned writers having a different vision to those still working for The Simpsons. John Ortved said "even with The Simpsons' top dogs in the writing room, and all the time in the world, they could not approach the brilliance they had achieved two decades earlier", instead creating a 90 minute movie fill of "throwaway jokes, some forced and schmaltzy scenes...a plot that is more zany that captivating...[and] practically zero replay value". Ortved also argues that Simon and Brooks have no real involvement in The Simpsons anymore.

The Daily Raider argues that many think Conan "had a significant impact on The Simpsons and its comedic style", and adds that fans and reviewers have said things like "'oh, if only Conan wrote again...' or 'this isn't as good as the years of the Conan O'Brien era' or 'why doesn't The Simpsons have writers on the talent level of Conan anymore'. In 2012, Al Jean said "If I could add any one writer to [my] staff...I'd get back Conan O'Brien. His office is waiting." In a Moonshine River review, Stroup said, "though Tim Long's one of my favorite latter day writers, his recent output has mostly disappointed me." In a Treehouse of Horror 23 review, Stroup said, "this one felt lively, and made me hope David Mandel is officially on the staff." Joe Berkowitz of Splitsider notes that "After Phil Hartman's untimely death in May of 1998, the producers on The Simpsons wisely decided not to find a replacement for the characters of Troy McClure or Lionel Hutz. This move was both a display of respect to the actor, and an admission that he was impossible to replace. Perhaps Hartman was the secret weapon that kept The Simpsons together. [His appearance in an episode] guarantee[d] at least a couple bankable extra laughs in every other episode. That may not seem like a lot, but it adds up. Phil Hartman was undoubtedly part of the reason why seasons 2-9 of The Simpsons are roundly thought to be the show's best years." In 2011, Nancy Cartwright said, "We're lucky when we get Jim [to the table reads], and [he] will still contribute and I love that about our show because after all these years [he still has input]".

== See also ==
- History of The Simpsons
