= Principal Skinner =

Fictional character from The Simpsons franchise

- The Simpsons character
- First appearance: "Simpsons Roasting on an Open Fire" (1989)
- Created by: Matt Groening
- Designed by: Matt Groening
- Voiced by: Harry Shearer

In-universe information
- Full name: W. Seymour Skinner (formerly Armin Tamzarian)
- Gender: Male
- Occupation: Principal of Springfield Elementary School
- Affiliation: U.S. Army; Springfield Elementary School
- Significant other: Edna Krabappel (ex-fiancée)
- Relatives: Sheldon Skinner (father); Agnes Skinner (mother)

Principal W. Seymour Skinner is a recurring fictional character in the animated sitcom The Simpsons, who is voiced by Harry Shearer. He is the principal of Springfield Elementary School, which he struggles to control, and is constantly engaged in a battle against its inadequate resources, apathetic and bitter teachers, and often rowdy and unenthusiastic students, Bart Simpson being a standout example.

Skinner attempts to institute discipline at the school, with an uptight, militaristic attitude that stems from his years in the United States Army as a Green Beret including service in the Vietnam War, where he was captured and held as a prisoner of war. He is quick to take orders from his superiors, chiefly his mother Agnes and Superintendent Chalmers.

== Role in The Simpsons ==
Skinner's actions often involve ensuring the school has adequate funding. His constant, desperate, and usually ineffective attempts at maintaining discipline are an effort to receive good reviews in the frequent inspections of his very strict boss, Superintendent Chalmers, who makes no effort to hide his disapproval of Skinner. These inspections usually turn awry due to Bart Simpson's elaborate pranks, which play off Skinner's desperation for order. Over the years of pranks and inspections, though, Skinner has developed a love–hate relationship with Bart; when Skinner was fired and replaced by Ned Flanders, Bart found pranks less meaningful, due to Flanders' lax approach to discipline, while Skinner missed his constant battles with Bart. The two bonded during this time and Bart made an effort to get Skinner reinstated in the school.

One of Skinner's defining traits is that he has served as a Green Beret sergeant during the Vietnam War, where he was captured by the Viet Cong at the Battle of Khe Sanh and spent three years as a prisoner of war. Seeing his entire platoon devoured by an elephant was one of the many things that led to the development of his post-traumatic stress disorder. He is also quite bitter about the treatment that he and other Vietnam veterans have received upon returning from the war. Skinner is a highly skilled combatant, particularly hand-to-hand, and demonstrates his abilities in several episodes. Skinner often seems weak-willed and easily suppressed, but frequently uses his military command experience to get real respect and discipline. When he and the students are snowed-in at the school, he treats them like his squad to control the chaos temporarily, before they mutiny.

Although Skinner likes to maintain the image of a strict disciplinarian, he is often weak-willed and nervous and has a very unhealthy dependence on his mother, who still lives with him, constantly torments him and nicknames him "Spanky". Aside from a short-lived relationship with Patty Bouvier, most of Skinner's love life is focused on Edna Krabappel. He and Edna kiss in Martin's playhouse after they are invited to a birthday party, and they are witnessed by Bart. He loses his job along with Edna when Superintendent Chalmers is advised of their romance by Chief Wiggum, after which Skinner and Edna lock themselves in the school with Bart demanding their jobs back. After Skinner is reinstated, he and Edna date for several more years and become engaged, but later cancel the wedding. Edna has shown she does want to continue dating Skinner, but first wants him to commit to her—namely by not letting his mother, with whom he still lives, control him anymore.

The controversial season 9 episode "The Principal and the Pauper" heavily alters Skinner's backstory, revealing him as an impostor. Born as Armin Tamzarian, he has been a troubled orphan from Capital City, who is forced into the US Army during the Vietnam War. There, he serves as a Green Beret under Sgt. Seymour Skinner, whom he comes to idolize and befriend. When the sergeant is reported missing and presumed dead, Armin returns to Springfield to inform Skinner's mother, Agnes, but she deliberately mistakes him for Seymour, so he assumes his identity and follows Skinner's dream of becoming a school principal. The real Seymour Skinner (voiced by Martin Sheen) is alive after all, and briefly returns to Springfield to take his rightful place as Springfield Elementary School principal, but proves hopelessly unpopular and the Springfielders run him out of town on the railroad. Judge Snyder grants Tamzarian Skinner's "name, and his past, present, future, and mother", and decrees that no one will mention his true identity again "under penalty of torture" (although Lisa uses the real name in the episode "I, (Annoyed Grunt)-Bot"). A clip from the episode is used in season eleven's "Behind the Laughter" as an example of the show's increasingly "gimmicky and nonsensical plots". The continuity of the series appears to have been retconned to the original story of Seymour Skinner in the 2010 episode "Boy Meets Curl", as he is clearly shown to kick Agnes Skinner in utero, establishing him as Agnes' biological son after all. This is further declared in the Season 29 episode "Grampy Can Ya Hear Me" where a teenage Seymour is shown living with Agnes before going off to college.

Another part of Skinner's backstory is revealed in the season 21 episode "Pranks and Greens". When Bart plays numerous pranks on teachers at school, Skinner reveals to Bart that there was a student who was an even better prankster than him. Bart is eager to discover the prankster's identity. Later, Groundskeeper Willie tells him the story: years ago, the school had a swimming pool and team, with Willie as their coach. Skinner was a more easygoing principal, but it all changed when student Andy Hamilton filled the pool with worms and locked Skinner inside it for a long weekend (Monday being a teachers' holiday, Skinner was not rescued until Tuesday morning). This experience has caused him to become serious and almost merciless in his approach to rules, even going as far as to shut down the pool and demoting Willie, the swim teacher, to groundskeeper.

== Character ==
=== Creation ===
Principal Skinner first appeared in "Simpsons Roasting on an Open Fire", which was also the first Simpsons episode to air. The first drawing of Skinner was done by Matt Groening, who based him on "all the principals of [his] youth, rolled into one bland lump." Writer Jon Vitti named him after behavioral psychologist B. F. Skinner. An original idea for Skinner was that he would continually mispronounce words. He does this in the series premiere "Simpsons Roasting on an Open Fire", but the idea was later dropped. Skinner was originally supposed to wear a toupée, but it was dropped because the writers disliked "that type of joke". In later episodes, Skinner's behavior was based on teachers that Bill Oakley and Josh Weinstein had in high school.

=== Development ===
Superintendent Chalmers was introduced in the episode "Whacking Day" as a boss for Skinner. Harry Shearer and Hank Azaria, the voice of Chalmers, fell right into the characters and quite often ad-lib between them.

=== "The Principal and the Pauper" ===
In "The Principal and the Pauper", it is revealed that Skinner was not who he claimed to be and was really named Armin Tamzarian. The episode was pitched and written by Ken Keeler, who was inspired by the Tichborne case of 19th-century England. Producers Bill Oakley and Josh Weinstein were excited about the episode because Principal Skinner was one of their favorite characters. They "spent a month immersed in the mind of Seymour Skinner" to prepare that episode, and from that point forward, took every opportunity to "tinker with [Skinner's] personality and his backstory and his homelife."

They intended for the episode to be "an experiment" and that the ending was meant to allow viewers to reset to the point before Skinner was revealed to be an impostor. The revelation that Principal Skinner was not who the audience had long been led to believe (as well as the self-referential deus ex machina ending of the episode) was negatively received by many fans and critics, and is considered by some to be the point at which the series as a whole jumped the shark. Oakley considers "The Principal and the Pauper" the most controversial episode from his tenure as executive producer.

In April 2001, in an interview, Harry Shearer, the voice of Principal Skinner, recalled that after reading the script, he told the writers, "That's so wrong. You're taking something that an audience has built eight years or nine years of investment in and just tossed it in the trash can for no good reason, for a story we've done before with other characters. It's so arbitrary and gratuitous, and it's disrespectful to the audience."

The writers themselves have since mocked the inconsistencies created by the episode; in the season 15 episode "I, (Annoyed Grunt)-Bot", Lisa is seen talking to her new cat, Snowball V, saying "You're Snowball Five. But to save money on a new dish, we'll just call you Snowball Two and pretend this whole thing never happened", after losing three cats to death in the episode. Skinner walks by and asks, "That's really a cheat, isn't it?", to which Lisa pointedly replies, "I guess you're right, Principal Tamzarian." Skinner then quickly excuses himself to Lisa with "I'll just be moving along, Lisa. Snowball Two", and walks away.

Over time, "The Principal and the Pauper" came to be considered non-canon, showing the moment when Agnes was pregnant with him in "Boy Meets Curl", and in later episodes showing him through flashbacks growing up with Agnes, appearing as a child alongside her in "Walking Big & Tall", or his time at home before university in "Grampy Can Ya Hear Me".
