= The Principal and the Pauper =

- The Simpsons episode
- Principal Skinner confessing that he is an impostor. The episode garnered controversy from fans and the critics, with many citing it as the moment the series jumped the shark.
- Episode no.: Season 9 Episode 2
- Directed by: Steven Dean Moore
- Written by: Ken Keeler
- Production code: 4F23
- Original air date: September 28, 1997

Guest appearance
- Martin Sheen as the real Seymour Skinner

Episode features
- Couch gag: The Simpsons are dressed as astronauts and sit on the couch just as it blasts off into space.
- Commentary: Bill Oakley; Josh Weinstein; Ken Keeler; Steven Dean Moore

Episode chronology
← Previous "The City of New York vs. Homer Simpson"	Next → "Lisa's Sax"
- The Simpsons season 9

"The Principal and the Pauper" is the second episode of the ninth season of the American animated television series The Simpsons and the 180th episode overall. It first aired on Fox in the United States on September 28, 1997. In the episode, Seymour Skinner begins to celebrate his twentieth anniversary as principal of Springfield Elementary School, when a man arrives claiming that Skinner has assumed his identity. Principal Skinner admits that his real name is Armin Tamzarian, and that he had thought the true Seymour Skinner, a friend from the Army, had died in the Vietnam War. Armin leaves Springfield, but is later persuaded to return as principal.

"The Principal and the Pauper" was written by Ken Keeler and directed by Steven Dean Moore. It guest-starred Martin Sheen as the real Seymour Skinner. Although it aired during the show's ninth season, it was a holdover from season eight.

Since its initial airing, the episode is often regarded as one of the most controversial episodes of the entire series. Many fans and critics reacted negatively to the revelation that Principal Skinner, a recurring character since the first episode who had undergone much character development, was an impostor. The episode has been criticized by series creator Matt Groening, and by Skinner's own voice actor Harry Shearer, and many regard it as the episode that ended the show's "Golden Age".

== Plot ==
On the eve of his 20th anniversary as school principal, Seymour Skinner is lured by his mother to Springfield Elementary School for a surprise party. The celebration goes well until a strange man arrives, claiming to be the real Seymour Skinner. Principal Skinner admits that he is an impostor, and that his real name is Armin Tamzarian. Armin then tells the story of the events that led him to steal Seymour Skinner's identity.

Armin was once a troubled young man and an orphan from Capital City who enlisted in the Army in order to avoid a jail sentence for petty crimes. There, he met and befriended the real Sergeant Seymour Skinner, who became his mentor and helped him find meaning in his troubled life. Seymour told Armin that his dream was to become an elementary school principal in Springfield after the war. Later, Seymour was declared missing and presumed dead. Armin took the news of the apparent death to Seymour's mother, Agnes. Upon meeting him, however, Agnes mistook him for her son, and Armin could not bear to deliver the message. He instead allowed Agnes to call him Seymour, and took over Seymour's life. Meanwhile, the real Seymour Skinner spent five years in a POW camp, then worked in a Chinese sweatshop for two decades until it was shut down by the United Nations.

Following these revelations, the people of Springfield begin to distrust Armin, who decides that there is no longer any place for him in Springfield and leaves for Capital City, sadly breaking up with Edna Krabappel in the process. Having planned to resume his old persona as a no-good street thug, Armin still retains his mannerisms from when he was Skinner. The real Skinner is then offered the chance to realize his dream and take over as school principal. He takes the job, but finds himself isolated by the townspeople, who realize they prefer Armin to him. With the real Skinner refusing to take up Armin's old hobbies and leading a more independent life away from home, Agnes realizes she misses having Armin as a son.

The Simpson family heads to Capital City with Edna and Agnes (and Grampa and Jasper) to find Armin at his apartment. After Agnes orders Armin to return home, expressing that he is more of a real son to her than the real Skinner is, Homer persuades Mayor Quimby and all the other citizens to allow Armin to resume his assumed identity as Principal Skinner. The real Skinner is unhappy about this and refuses to give up his job and his dignity just because the people of Springfield prefer Armin to him. In response, the townspeople banish the real Skinner from town by tying him to a chair on a flatcar of a freight train (literally running him out of town on a rail). Judge Snyder declares that Armin will again be referred to as Seymour Skinner, that he will return to his job as school principal, and that no one shall ever again refer to Skinner or the fallout from his visit, under penalty of torture.

== Production ==
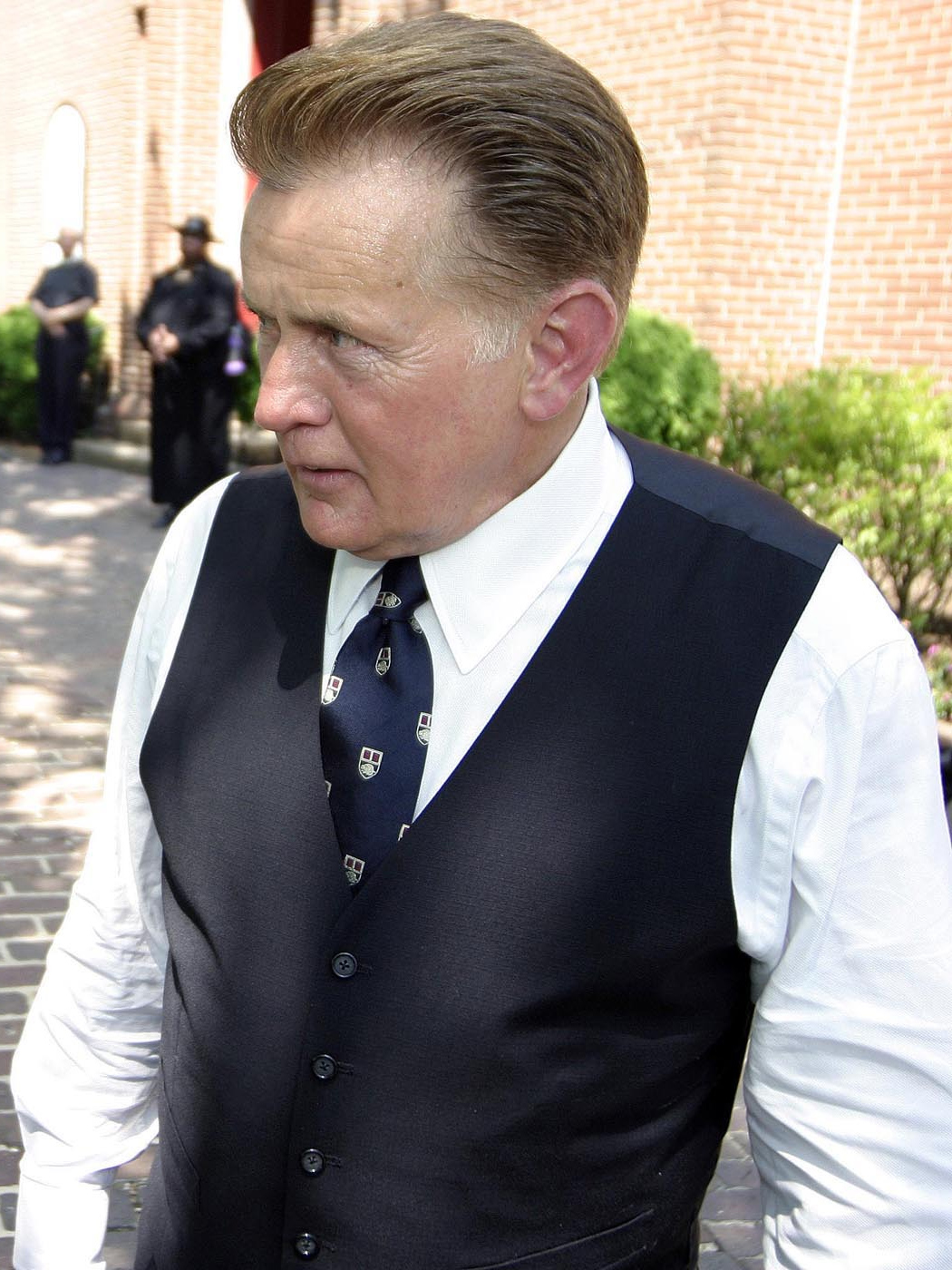
Martin Sheen provided the voice for the real Seymour Skinner.

"The Principal and the Pauper" was the last episode of The Simpsons written by Ken Keeler, who also pitched the original idea for the episode. Many fans believe the episode is based on the story of Martin Guerre or the 1993 film Sommersby. According to animation director Steve Moore, one of the working titles for the episode was "Skinnersby". However, Keeler has said he was inspired by the Tichborne Case of nineteenth-century England. The episode's official title is a reference to the book The Prince and the Pauper by Mark Twain.

Producers Bill Oakley and Josh Weinstein were excited about the episode because Principal Skinner was one of their favorite characters. The pair had already written the season five episode "Sweet Seymour Skinner's Baadasssss Song", which was an in-depth study of the character. Oakley said he and Weinstein "spent a month immersed in the mind of Seymour Skinner" to prepare that episode, and from that point forward, took every opportunity to "tinker with [Skinner's] personality and his backstory and his homelife".

Describing the real Seymour Skinner, Keeler remarked, "It would have been easy to make him a really horrible, nasty, dislikeable guy, but we didn't do that. We made him just not quite right, not quite Skinner, and a little bit off". Bill Oakley said the idea behind the character was that he "just lacked pizzazz". The producers selected Martin Sheen to voice the character because they admired his performance in the 1979 film Apocalypse Now and felt his voice would be appropriate for a Vietnam War veteran.

Keeler borrowed the name Armin Tamzarian from a claims adjuster who had assisted him after a car accident when he moved to Los Angeles. However, the real Armen Tamzarian (now a California Superior Court Judge) was unaware his name was being used until after the episode aired. Keeler said he later received a "curtly phrased" letter from Tamzarian, who wanted to know why his name appeared in the episode. Keeler feared he would face legal troubles, but afterwards, Tamzarian explained that he was simply curious and did not intend to scare anyone.

== Reception and legacy ==
"The Principal and the Pauper" finished 41st in the United States in the ratings for the week of September 22–28, 1997, with a Nielsen rating of 9.2. The episode was the Fox Broadcasting Company's second highest-rated broadcast that week, following King of the Hill. The network's ratings average for the week was 6.4.

The episode's revelation of Principal Skinner being an impostor, as well as the self-referential deus ex machina/reset button ending, was negatively received by many fans and critics, as Skinner had been a recurring character since the first season and, after years of character development, his backstory had suddenly been changed. Many saw the episode as being responsible for the series as a whole jumping the shark; additionally, it is advised by many Simpsons fans to disregard the episode in its entirety and thoroughly deny its existence. Bill Oakley considers "The Principal and the Pauper" the most controversial episode from his tenure as executive producer.

In his 2004 book Planet Simpson, Chris Turner described "The Principal and the Pauper" as the "broadcast that marked [the] abrupt plunge" from The Simpsons' "Golden Age", which he says began in the middle of the show's third season. He called the episode "[one of] the weakest episodes in Simpsons history", adding that "a blatant, continuity-scrambling plot twist of this sort might've been forgivable if the result had been as funny or sharply satirical as the classics of the Golden Age, but alas it's emphatically not." Turner also noted that the episode "still sports a couple of virtuoso gags," but says that such moments are limited.

In 2007, Ian Jones, writing for The Guardian, argued that the show "became stupid" in 1997, pointing to "The Principal and the Pauper" as the bellwether: "Come again? A major character in a long-running series gets unmasked as a fraud? It was cheap, idle storytelling." In 2006, Alan Sepinwall and Matt Zoller Seitz, writing for The Star-Ledger, cited the episode when asserting that the quality of The Simpsons "gets much spottier" in season nine. Alan Sepinwall observed in another Star-Ledger article, "[The episode] was so implausible that even the characters were disavowing it by the end of the episode." Jon Hein, who coined the term "jumping the shark" to refer to negative changes in television series, wrote in his book Jump the Shark: TV Edition, "We finally spotted a fin at the start of the ninth season when Principal Skinner's true identity was revealed as Armin Tamzarian." James Greene of Nerve.com ranked the episode fifth on his list of the "Ten Times The Simpsons Jumped the Shark", calling it a "nonsensical meta-comedy" and arguing that it "seemed to betray the reality of the show itself." In 2022, on the 25th anniversary of the episode's premiere, Fatherly looked back negatively at "The Principal and the Pauper", describing the plot twist as the moment the show stopped being perfect: "It wasn't funny, it was just mean, and the ending of the episode inadvertently made you complicit in its viciousness. Ultimately, the citizens of Springfield decide to force things back to normal by tying the real Skinner to a departing train and legally declaring that Tamzarian's theft of an entire life is fine. And, well, yeah, we as the viewers wanted things to go back to normal once the episode was over, but … this was just heartless."

Other figures associated with The Simpsons have publicly criticized the episode. In an April 2001 interview, Harry Shearer, the voice of Principal Skinner, recalled that after reading the script, he told the writers, "That's so wrong. You're taking something that an audience has built eight years or nine years of investment in and just tossed it in the trash can for no good reason, for a story we've done before with other characters. It's so arbitrary and gratuitous, and it's disrespectful to the audience." In a December 2006 interview, Shearer added, "Now, [the writers] refuse to talk about it. They realize it was a horrible mistake. They never mention it. It's like they're punishing [the audience] for paying attention." In the introduction to the ninth season DVD boxset, series creator Matt Groening described "The Principal and the Pauper" as "one of [his] least favorite episodes". He also called the episode "a mistake" in an interview with Rolling Stone.

In contrast, Warren Martyn and Adrian Wood, the authors of I Can't Believe It's a Bigger and Better Updated Unofficial Simpsons Guide, praised the episode, calling it "one of the series' all-time best episodes, mainly because it shows us a human side, not just of Principal Skinner, but of his hectorish [sic] Mom as well." They add that "Martin Sheen steals the show ... in a brief but important slice of Simpsons history." George Morrow of Comic Book Resources defends the episode, praising its execution, jokes, and writing, calling it a "overlooked gem and deserving of a reevaluation." Total Film's Nathan Ditum named Martin Sheen's performance in the episode the 20th best guest appearance on The Simpsons.

"This [episode] is about a community of people who like things just the way they are. Skinner's not really close to these people—you know, he's a minor character—but they get upset when someone comes in and says, 'This is not really the way things are', and they run the messenger out of town on the rail. When the episode aired, lo and behold, a community of people who like things just the way they are got mad. It never seems to have occurred to anyone that this episode is about the people who hate it."

— Ken Keeler

Ken Keeler, Bill Oakley, and Josh Weinstein all defend the episode in its DVD commentary. Keeler asserts, "I am very, very proud of the job I did on this episode. This is the best episode of television I feel I ever wrote." He describes the episode as a commentary on "people who like things just the way they are", and remarks, "It never seems to have occurred to anyone that this episode is about the people who hate it." However, Keeler says that some of the dialogue was changed from his original draft, making this point less obvious. Oakley and Weinstein explain that they wanted to push the boundaries of the series while working as show-runners, and advise viewers to treat "The Principal and the Pauper" as an "experiment". They surmise that the negative reception was partly due to the fact that it was not immediately apparent to viewers that this was such an episode (as opposed to, for example, "The Simpsons Spin-Off Showcase"). They also describe the ending of the episode as an attempt to reset the continuity and allow fans to consider the episode as non-canonical, divorced from the larger series.

Later episodes of The Simpsons contain references to "The Principal and the Pauper". A clip from the episode was used in season eleven's "Behind the Laughter" as an example of the show's increasingly "gimmicky and nonsensical plots". In the season fifteen episode "I, (Annoyed Grunt)-Bot", Lisa addresses Principal Skinner as "Principal Tamzarian" when Skinner chides her for naming her new cat Snowball II, after their cat of the same name that had died earlier in the episode.
