= Behind the Laughter =

- The Simpsons episode
- Episode no.: Season 11; Episode 22
- Directed by: Mark Kirkland
- Written by: Tim Long; George Meyer; Mike Scully; Matt Selman
- Production code: BABF19
- Original air date: May 21, 2000

Guest appearances
- Willie Nelson as himself; Jim Forbes as the narrator

Episode features
- Chalkboard gag: "I will not obey the voices in my head"
- Couch gag: (first) The Simpsons sit on the couch as normal. Bart puts a coin in a slot on the arm of the couch and the couch vibrates away, taking the family with them. / (second) In an "aborted" couch gag, the family (minus Bart) sits wearing Western outfits. The director cuts the scene as Bart is busy negotiating a film deal over the phone; the family briefly descends into arguing before Kang and Kodos show up, asking if they'll be needed on set.
- Commentary: Mike Scully; George Meyer; Ian Maxtone-Graham; Matt Selman; Tim Long; Mark Kirkland

Episode chronology
← Previous "It's a Mad, Mad, Mad, Mad Marge"	Next → "Treehouse of Horror XI"
- The Simpsons season 11

"Behind the Laughter" is the twenty-second and final episode of the eleventh season of the American animated television series The Simpsons. It first aired on the Fox network in the United States on May 21, 2000. In the episode, a parody of the VH1 series Behind the Music, the Simpsons are portrayed as actors on a sitcom, and their dramatic inner turmoil and struggles are detailed. Told in a mockumentary format, the episode presents a fictional version of how The Simpsons began.

The episode was directed by Mark Kirkland and written by Tim Long, George Meyer, Mike Scully and Matt Selman. The idea was pitched by Long, and the writers wrote the episode quickly without a draft. VH1 and the producers of Behind the Music allowed the crew to use the show's visual graphics package, and Behind the Music narrator Jim Forbes recorded narrations. In addition, country musician Willie Nelson guest stars as himself.

The episode received critical acclaim, with many reviewers noting it as a highlight of the season and the series itself, and won an Emmy Award for Outstanding Animated Program (For Programming less than One Hour) in 2000. In addition, composer Alf Clausen won an Annie Award for "Outstanding Individual Achievement for Music in an Animated Television Production".

In May 2004, the BBC chose it as the last Simpsons episode to be aired on BBC Two, having lost the UK terrestrial broadcasting rights in February 2002 to Channel 4, who later aired the series in November 2004.

== Plot ==
The episode is a parody of the VH1 biography series Behind the Music and shares its narrator, Jim Forbes. It begins with the Simpson family history and how they got into show business: believing that families depicted in the numerous TV shows they watch together bear no resemblance to their comparative dysfunctionalism, Homer writes and directs an inadequate video "pilot" that fails to attract the attention of the major networks except for Fox, as its president happens to be Marge's hairdresser. After much fine-tuning and on-set mishaps that result in the formulation of many of the show's running gags, The Simpsons' resounding ratings and merchandising success makes the family extraordinarily wealthy; having moved out of their house on Evergreen Terrace to live in MC Hammer's former mansion, "Hammertime" (renamed "Homertime"), they expand their scope by working with David Geffen on a series of Grammy-winning, "mega-platinum" novelty albums.

Problems begin to arise as the Simpsons' fame grows: they become reckless spendthrifts, alternating between buying their colleagues extravagant gifts and paying them to perform embarrassing acts for their amusement. When Homer is injured after plummeting into Springfield Gorge (as seen in "Bart the Daredevil"), he becomes addicted to prescription painkillers; Marge blows much of the family's fortune on licensing her likeness for use on diaphragms, and Bart goes into rehab after attacking flight attendants, with his role on the show being temporarily filled out by his friend Richie Rich. Following a tip from Apu, the IRS discovers that the Simpsons are evading tax payments and repossess Homertime. As tensions mount in the family, the show's writing and production team resort to gimmicky, nonsensical plots and shameless guest star appearances to maintain ratings. Finally, while performing with Jimmy Carter at the Iowa State Fair, the family gets into a big dispute and splits up.

Fox puts the show on hiatus since none of the Simpsons will talk to each other. The members pursue independent endeavors: Homer becomes a character actor in stage productions such as Rent II: Condo Fever; Bart replaces Lorenzo Lamas as the star of the syndicated action show Renegade; Marge creates a nightclub act performing Bob Marley's song "I Shot the Sheriff"; and Lisa writes Where Are My Residuals?, a tell-all book about her negative experiences from working on the show, such as Homer's spiking of her cereal with anti-growth hormones. Bringing the family back together seems impossible until Dr. Hibbert's old fraternity brother, country singer Willie Nelson, puts on a phony awards ceremony to reconcile the family. In an emotional reunion, they embrace and forgive their mistakes, and look forward to many more years of The Simpsons.

The episode ends with an epilogue, in which Forbes states that "the future looks brighter than ever for this northern Kentucky family". (Note: In keeping with the long-running joke of Springfield's unknown and unidentifiable location, the writers did not want to "pin [the location] down for the fans," and with knowledge that the episode would rerun twice, had Forbes record several alternate locations aside from the original version's "northern Kentucky" (such as "southern Illinois"), which were seen on Fox reruns. Each of the alternate locations, including "southern Missouri" and the unused "small island of Lanai," can be found as an easter egg on the eleventh season DVD set.) In an editing room, the Simpsons are shown viewing a scene from an upcoming episode from the next season, in which the family express enthusiasm about winning a trip to Delaware. (Note: This plot device, as well as the dialogue from this scene, would actually be used in the final episode of the next season, "Simpsons Tall Tales".) Seemingly in response to the stilted and unfunny quality of the proceedings, Homer quietly assures the editor that the next season will be the last. The final scene is a mock teaser for an "upcoming episode" of Behind the Laughter about Huckleberry Hound, in which he reveals that he is gay.

== Production ==
Gay Rosenthal, a friend of executive producer Mike Scully, was producing the VH1 series Behind the Music, which was very popular during the episode's production. Tim Long was the one to pitch the idea for the episode. The idea for the episode was a drastic departure for the series to try something so different. It took the writers a long time to conceptualize the show, as they were unsure whether to make Homer a filmmaker or make the characters unaware they were being filmed. Selman recalled that there was no draft for the episode, instead the writers just sat down and "pounded it out." He noted that one of the disadvantages for producing an animated show that takes up to a year in advance to create was that many other comedy shows, most notably Saturday Night Live with their "More cowbell" sketch, had already done Behind the Music parodies. Although the final episode only features one bleeped curse word for Marge (for comedic effect), Meyer recalled the writers spent many weeks just "pitching Marge filth."

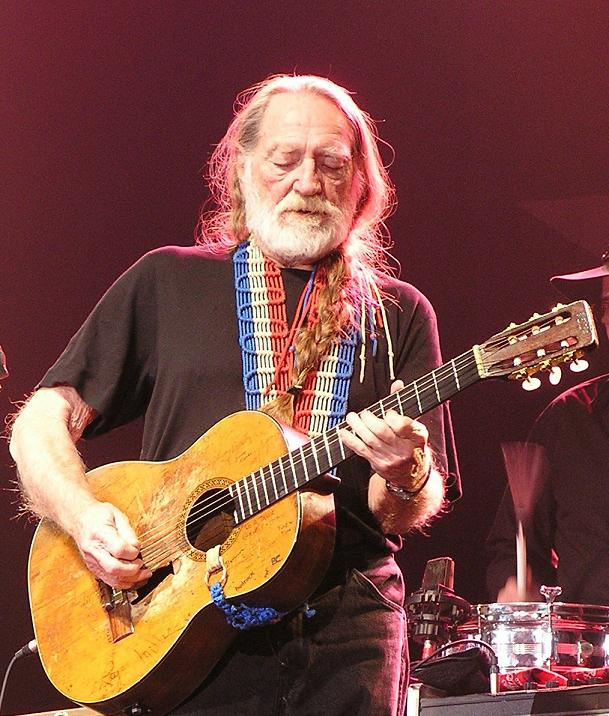
Willie Nelson guest stars as himself

The writers had particular fun writing over-the-top, melodramatic "tortured metaphors," many of which were penned by producer David Mirkin. Although not credited, Scully has noted writers Tom Gammill and Max Pross for making significant contributions to the episode. The crew used actual early Simpsons promotional posters in the episode. VH1 and Gay Rosenthal Productions were both "extremely cooperative" regarding the episode, letting the team use the entire graphics package. Larina Adamson drove over to the VH1 headquarters in order to compile most of the video graphics package. Part of the imitating of Behind the Music was using the "corny, stock interstitial footage to amp up the drama of the situation."

Ian Maxtone-Graham directed the voice actors during the recording sessions for the episode. Jim Forbes, narrator for Behind the Music, came in to the studio and did the narrations, which George Meyer called "fantastic". When Scully went to the studio to record Willie Nelson's guest appearance, he was running late and had to wait, as Nelson was recording a duet with B.B. King. Meyer recalled that Nelson said to the producers that he enjoyed The Simpsons, and watched it on his tour bus before he went to perform. Mark Kirkland called the episode one of the "oddest he'd ever worked on." He attended the table reading for the episode with knowledge he was to direct the episode, but was surprised to find that the story was "not a linear story […] it was all chopped up." In the direction aspect, the episode was deemed to be very challenging, but also easy because the animation team did not need to look for continuity errors as the episode "jumped around so much." The animators and Kirkland watched multiple episodes of Behind the Music in order to get the feel of it, as did the writers.

In an interview with Entertainment Weekly regarding the renewal of the show in season 23, showrunner Al Jean discusses what episodes that have previously aired might serve well as a series finale. He regards "Behind the Laughter" and "Eternal Moonshine of the Simpson Mind" as the strongest candidates, and further elaborates: "I don't think we're a serialized show and I don't think we're going to have a Lost finale where we reveal some truth about the world that nobody ever suspected. Whenever we do a last episode, we just hope that it would be sweet, true to the characters, funny, and give you a nice feeling for where the Simpsons would be headed."

== Cultural references ==
The episode contains many references and allusions to Behind the Music, and one line the staff thought was humorous was pulled straight from the actual series.

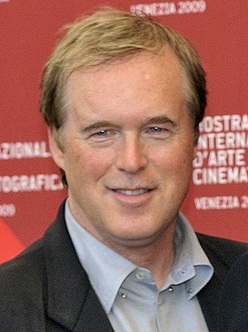
A statue of the title character from The Iron Giant is seen in the episode, an homage to its director Brad Bird, formerly of The Simpsons.

- During Comic Book Guy's interview, a statue of the Giant from The Iron Giant can be seen, as a nod to former Simpsons director and creative consultant Brad Bird, who left to direct the film.
- The teenage fans of Bart Simpson screaming to the song "Twist and Shout" is a Beatlemania reference.
- Bart and his parachute pants are allusions to MC Hammer, which was inspired by the Behind the Music episode based on his life that the staff watched during production.
- Bart, while getting pampered by assistants, agrees to take a role in Teen Wolf 3, a reference that Scully later considered to be dated.
- Richie Rich replaces Bart's role on the show while Bart is undergoing rehab; the animators colored his suit green to avoid copyright infringement.
- When The Simpsons is put on hiatus, the fictional Fox replaces it with Peepin' It Real!, which consists of hidden camera footage from Ann Taylor women's dressing rooms; Scully noted that the retailer was "not happy" about this joke.
- The episode is also knowingly self-referential. A series of T-shirts are shown sporting a number of Bart Simpson "catchphrases", such as "You bet your sweet bippy, man" and "Life begins at conception, man." These are parodies of both officially licensed and bootleg Simpsons-themed T-shirts in the early days of the series, usually revolving around Bart.
- The famous scene of Homer plummeting into Springfield Gorge on Bart's skateboard from the season two episode "Bart the Daredevil" is shown; the sequence in which Homer falls from the jagged cliffs was reanimated. "Behind the Laughter" then shows the "unfunny aftermath" of Homer going through physical rehabilitation and becoming addicted to painkillers.
- The episode states the series turned to "gimmicky premises and nonsensical plots" as ratings dipped, and uses a clip from the episode "The Principal and the Pauper" to get that point across, as it was a highly controversial episode that many fans and critics panned.

== Reception ==
The episode was ranked as the fourth best The Simpsons episode by AskMen. In 2012, Johnny Dee of The Guardian listed the episode as one of his five favorite episodes in the history of The Simpsons, noting The Simpsons is "good at self-parody". The Simpsons writing staff voted this in their list of Top 15 Simpsons episode becoming the newest episode in the list. Screen Rant called it the best episode of the 11th season.
