= The City of New York vs. Homer Simpson =

- The Simpsons episode
- One of the promotional cards for the episode, featuring the Simpsons atop the Empire State Building à la King Kong.
- Episode no.: Season 9 Episode 1
- Directed by: Jim Reardon
- Written by: Ian Maxtone-Graham
- Production code: 4F22
- Original air date: September 21, 1997

Guest appearances
- Michael Dees sings "Theme from New York, New York"; Joan Kenley as woman on the phone

Episode features
- Couch gag: The Simpsons are seen portraying the Harlem Globetrotters, showing off elaborate basketball skills to the tune of "Sweet Georgia Brown".
- Commentary: Commentary 1: Bill Oakley; Josh Weinstein; Jim Reardon; Commentary 2: Ian Maxtone-Graham; Dan Castellaneta

Episode chronology
← Previous "The Secret War of Lisa Simpson"	Next → "The Principal and the Pauper"
- The Simpsons season 9

"The City of New York vs. Homer Simpson" is the first episode of the ninth season of the American animated television series The Simpsons. It was originally broadcast on Fox in the United States on September 21, 1997, as the 179th episode of the series. The episode features the Simpson family traveling to Manhattan to recover the family car, which was taken by Barney Gumble and abandoned outside the World Trade Center, where it had been repeatedly issued with parking tickets and restrained with a wheel clamp.

Writer Ian Maxtone-Graham was interested in making an episode where the Simpson family travels to New York to retrieve their misplaced car. Executive producers Bill Oakley and Josh Weinstein suggested that the car be found in Austin J. Tobin Plaza at the World Trade Center, as they wanted a location that would be widely known. Great lengths were taken to make a detailed replication of the borough of Manhattan.

The episode received acclaim from fans and television critics and has since been on accolade lists of The Simpsons episodes, whereas the "You're Checkin' In" musical sequence won a pair of awards. Because of the World Trade Center's main role, the episode was taken off syndication in many areas following the September 11 attacks, but returned to syndication by 2006. The episode also features the first appearance of Duffman, who would become a recurring character in the series.

== Plot ==
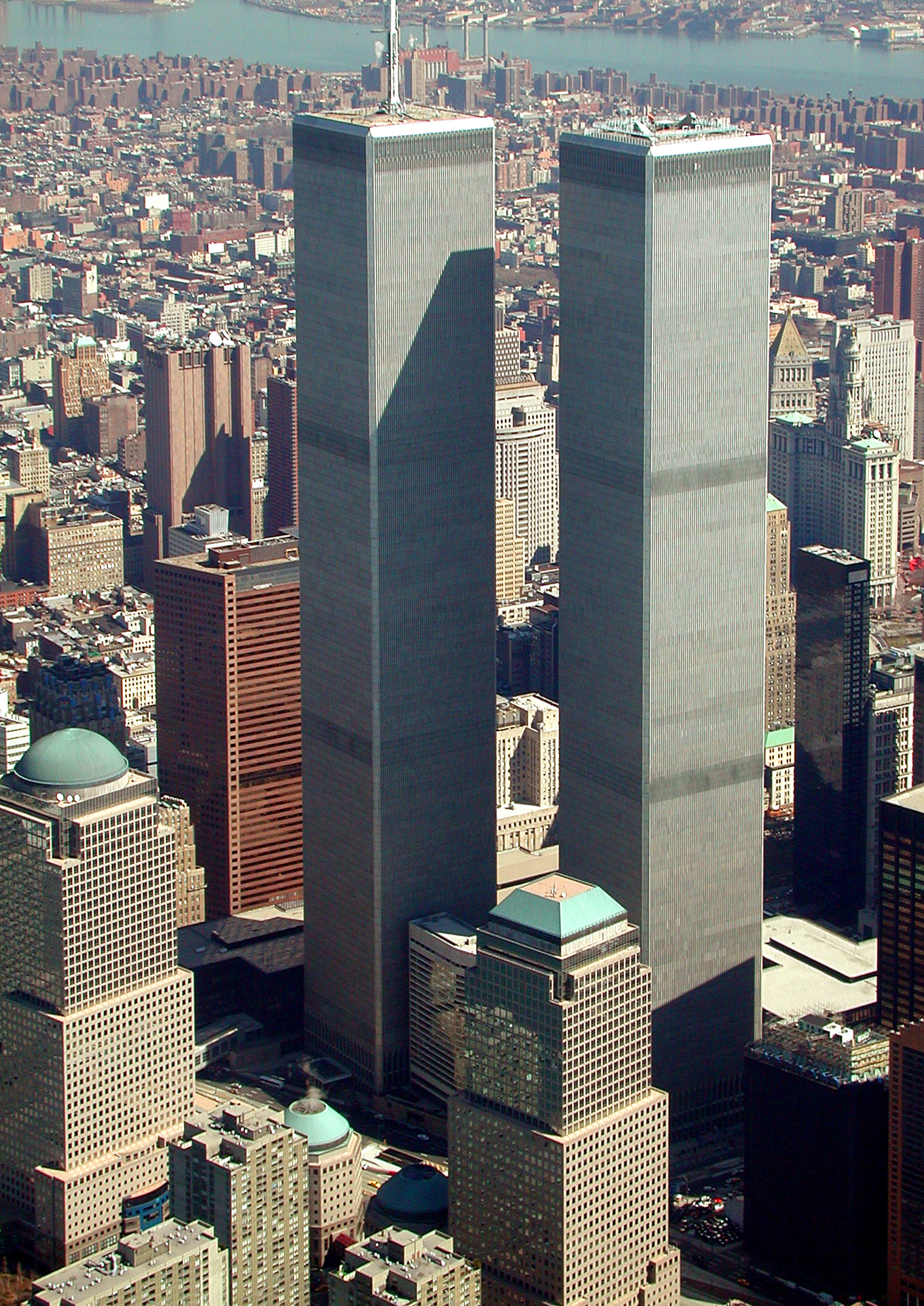
The World Trade Center, seen here in March 2001, was prominently featured in the episode.

At Moe's Tavern, Moe informs Homer and his friends that one of them must be a designated driver and Barney loses the choosing draw. After Barney drives the drunken men home in Homer's car, Homer allows him to use it to drive himself home, expecting Barney to return it the following morning. In his distressed state, Barney disappears with the car. Two months later, Barney returns to Moe's Tavern, unable to recall where he left the car. Homer later receives a letter from New York City's government, which informs him that his car has been found illegally parked at the Austin J. Tobin Plaza and will be thrown into the East River if it is not reclaimed in the next seventy-two hours. Homer reveals to the family that he had been to New York once before during his teenage years and had a horrible experience. Marge and the children persuade Homer to go retrieve the car and he reluctantly agrees.

When the Simpsons arrive in Manhattan, they decide to split up. Upon finding his car, Homer discovers that it has been issued a multitude of parking tickets and clamped. While waiting for a parking officer to come and remove the clamp, Homer buys khlav kalash (an unidentifiable kebab served on a stick) and several cans of crab juice (in order to wash away the taste) from a street vendor. Soon needing to urinate but afraid to leave the car alone, Homer rushes into one of the towers' restrooms. While in there, the officer arrives and issues another parking ticket due to him not being present. Meanwhile, the other Simpsons tour the city before they finally visit Central Park where they will meet up with Homer; Bart leaves the group at one point to visit the headquarters of Mad magazine and is in awe when he discovers that its characters exist.

Homer realizes that he needs to meet up with the others and escape from the city before nightfall. Disregarding the clamp, he drives away as it damages the car's left front fender. After driving for some distance with the clamp, he eventually uses a road construction crew's jackhammer to remove it, despite the car being damaged further in the process, before racing to Central Park and reuniting with the other Simpsons. While driving back to Springfield, the family reflects on their wonderful time, while Homer's hatred for New York remains.

== Production ==
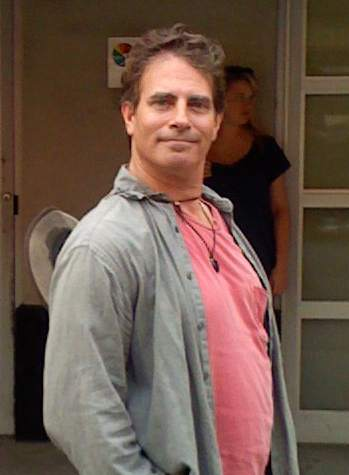
David Silverman was sent to Manhattan to take photographs of the area in order to make the episode more accurate.

Writer Ian Maxtone-Graham, a former resident of New York, had conceived the idea of having the family travel to the city to locate their missing car and believed it to be "a classic Manhattan problem". Bill Oakley, who had visited the World Trade Center when the construction of the towers was completed in 1973, suggested parking the car in the plaza of the buildings. Josh Weinstein observed that, "When we realized that there was a plaza between the two towers, we knew it was a perfect spot to have Homer's car."

The animators were told to make a detailed replica of the city. David Silverman was sent to Manhattan to take hundreds of pictures of the city and areas around the World Trade Center. When he returned, Lance Wilder and his team spent time creating new scenes and backgrounds, incorporating small details such as signs and hundreds of extras that would correctly illustrate the city. Oakley and Weinstein were pleased with the final results, and both noted that the buildings, streets, and even elevator cabins were detailed closely to their real life counterparts. In the final scene, as the family is seen driving away from New York on the George Washington Bridge, the credits roll with the "camera" gradually pulling back from a view of the car, to a view of the side, and then on to a panorama view of the city; as if the whole sequence was being shot from a helicopter. To achieve this effect, a computer model of the bridge pulling out was made and then printed out. With the print outs, photocopies were traced onto the animation cels. The process took a long time and was expensive, as the use of computer animation was not widespread when the episode was produced. Director Jim Reardon wanted to replicate films that ended in a similar way, and commented, "I remembered that every movie located in New York would pull back if you were leaving town on a bridge." Shortly before the episode aired, the production staff contacted Fox to make sure they would not run commercials during the credits.

Ken Keeler, who wrote the lyrics for the "You're Checkin' In" musical number, spent two hours in a room alone to write the song. Upon sharing the lyrics with the rest of the production staff, some revisions were made, although little was changed. Bill Oakley was unsatisfied with the part of the musical where the actor sings, "Hey, that's just my aspirin!", claiming that a better line could have been written.

Due to the prominence of the World Trade Center in the plot, the episode was removed from syndication after the September 11 attacks. By 2006, the episode had come back into syndication in some areas; however, parts of the episode were often edited out. One previously such edited item is a scene of two men arguing across Tower 1 and Tower 2, where a man from Tower 2 claims, "They stick all the jerks in Tower 1." Co-executive producer Bill Oakley commented in retrospect that the line was "regrettable". In 2019, a hand-drawn cel from the episode, depicting the two towers, was given to the National September 11 Memorial & Museum, in what the curator termed a "hilarious and tender" donation.

The "9" and the Twin Towers to the right of it have been described by some conspiracy theorists as foreshadowing the 9/11 attacks.

Some conspiracy theorists believe that a scene in the episode foreshadows the September 11 attacks: in it, Lisa holds a brochure for a $9 bus fare with the World Trade Center shown in the background. Showrunner Al Jean said in an interview with The New York Times in 2018, "There is a frame where there's a brochure that says New York at $9 a day, and behind the nine are the twin towers. So they look like an 11, and it looks like a 9/11. That one is a completely bizarre, strange thing." Bill Oakley, the episode's showrunner, reacted to a New York Observer article in 2010 via Twitter by saying, "$9 was picked as a comically cheap fare...To make an ad for it, the artist logically chose to include a silhouette of NYC. I signed off on the design. It's pretty self-explanatory. And I will grant that it's eerie given that it's on the only episode of any series ever that had an entire act of World Trade Center jokes."

== Cultural references ==
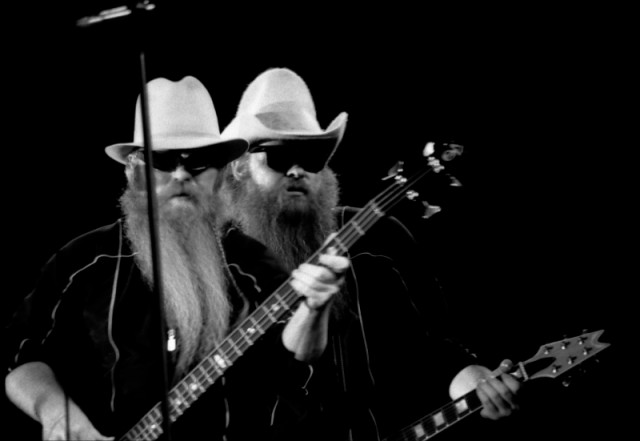
Bart mistakes a group of Hasidic Jews for ZZ Top.

The song used during Duffman's first and subsequent appearances is "Oh Yeah" by Yello, popularized in the film Ferris Bueller's Day Off. The Original Famous Ray's Pizza shop Homer sees is a parody of independently owned pizza stores that carry the name "Ray" in their name. Homer's taxi is registered to Calloway Cab Service, a reference to late jazz singer Cab Calloway. The musical sequence played during the Flushing Meadows segment is a stylistic parody of the piece "Flower Duet" from the opera Lakmé by Léo Delibes. When the traveling bus passes some Hasidic Jews, Bart mistakes them for ZZ Top and when he visits the headquarters of Mad magazine, he sees Alfred E. Neuman, the titular protagonists of Spy vs. Spy and cartoonist Dave Berg. The actor in the musical number "You're Checkin' In" was based on Robert Downey Jr., who was battling a cocaine addiction during the time of the episode's development, just as the character in the musical was. The sequence where Homer races alongside the carriage in Central Park was a reference to a similar scene from Ben-Hur. The final scene when the family is crossing the George Washington Bridge uses a version of the song "Theme from New York, New York", which continues to play throughout the credits.

Several cultural references are made during Homer's flashback to his previous visit to New York City. During the entire flashback, "The Entertainer", a piece made famous by the film The Sting, is played. Writer Ian Maxtone-Graham had brought the piece to the attention of director Jim Reardon and asked him to try to fit the piece into the flashback. Maxtone-Graham later commented, "It turned out that the music and the visual gags fit each other perfectly." In the beginning of the scene, Homer passes by a trio of pornographic film theaters, which are playing The Godfather's Parts, II; Jeremiah's Johnson; and Five Sleazy Pieces, plays on the names of The Godfather Part II, Jeremiah Johnson and Five Easy Pieces, respectively. A character resembling Woody Allen can be seen during the flashback, pouring trash out of his window onto Homer. When Homer falls into the sewer, he falls down to the underground world of mutants portrayed in C.H.U.D.

== Reception ==
"You're Checkin' In"
Sample of the musical "You're Checkin' In", which won awards for its music and lyrics

In its original broadcast, "The City of New York vs. Homer Simpson" finished 18th in ratings for the week of September 15–21, 1997, with a Nielsen rating of 10.7, equivalent to approximately 10.5 million viewing households. It was the highest-rated show on the Fox network that week, beating King of the Hill's season two opener "How to Fire a Rifle Without Really Trying".

The episode was well received by fans and television critics. The song "You're Checkin' In" won a 1998 Primetime Emmy Award for Outstanding Individual Achievement in Music and Lyrics, and an Annie Award for Outstanding Music in an Animated Television Production in the same year. In honor of The Simpsons' 300th episode milestone in 2003, Entertainment Weekly ranked the episode at number 13 on the list of their 25 favorite episodes, and AskMen ranked the episode at number seven on their top ten; in both cases it was the second-most-recent installment chosen to co-inhabit the lists. IGN named the episode the best of the ninth season, claiming "this is a very funny episode that started season 9 off on a strong note". Since the release of the season nine DVD box set, the episode has been highlighted by newspaper reviewers to show excellence of the season.

Ian Jones and Steve Williams, writers for British review website Off the Telly, claimed that the episode "ditched all pretence of a plot and went flat out for individual, unconnected sight gags and vignettes". The two noted that it was their least favorite debut episode for a season of The Simpsons. In a separate article in Off the Telly, Jones and Williams write that the episode "... wasn't shown for reasons of taste and has never appeared on terrestrial television in Britain", referring to a BBC Two schedule of the ninth season, which began in October 2001. Screen Rant called it the best episode of the ninth season.

== See also ==
- List of entertainment affected by the September 11 attacks
