= The Simpsons season 23 =

Season of television series

The Simpsons
- Season 23
- Digital purchase image featuring Ned Flanders
- Showrunners: Matt Selman (3 episodes); Al Jean
- No. of episodes: 22

Release
- Original network: Fox
- Original release: September 25, 2011 – May 20, 2012

Season chronology
- ← Previous; Season 22 Next → Season 24

The twenty-third season of the American animated sitcom The Simpsons aired on Fox between September 25, 2011, and May 20, 2012. The season was produced by Gracie Films and 20th Century Fox Television. The showrunner for the season was Al Jean, with three episodes ran with Matt Selman, one of those he also wrote himself. The show's 500th episode, "At Long Last Leave," aired February 19, 2012. On October 7, 2011, the series was renewed for a twenty-fourth and twenty-fifth season.

The season was nominated for two Primetime Emmy Awards, for three Writers Guild of America Awards, winning one, and for four Annie Awards, winning one.

== Voice cast & characters ==
=== Main cast ===
- Dan Castellaneta as Homer Simpson, Charlie, Barney Gumble, Grampa Simpson, Arnie Pye, Groundskeeper Willie, Krusty the Clown, Kodos, Itchy, Santa's Little Helper, Benjamin, Sideshow Mel, Mayor Quimby, Squeaky-Voiced Teen, Gil Gunderson, Hans Moleman, Rich Texan, Mr. Teeny, Blue-Haired Lawyer, Smitty, Snowball II and various others
- Julie Kavner as Marge Simpson, Patty Bouvier and Selma Bouvier
- Nancy Cartwright as Bart Simpson, Kearney Zzyzwicz, Nelson Muntz, Ralph Wiggum, Todd Flanders, Database and various others
- Yeardley Smith as Lisa Simpson
- Hank Azaria as Comic Book Guy, Carl Carlson, Moe Szyslak, Snake, Superintendent Chalmers, The Grumple, Sea Captain, State Comptroller Atkins, Chief Wiggum, Lou, Wiseguy, Cletus Spuckler, Old Jewish Man, Dr. Nick Riviera, Professor Frink, Doug, Kirk Van Houten, Bumblebee Man, Ron Rabinowitz, Apu Nahasapeemapetilon, Nash Castor, Duffman, Julio, Luigi Risotto, Disco Stu, Drederick Tatum, Chazz Busby and various others
- Harry Shearer as Lenny Leonard, Kent Brockman, Ned Flanders, Mr. Burns, Principal Skinner, Otto Mann, Dewey Largo, God, Kang, Scratchy, Jasper Beardly, Gary, Waylon Smithers, Reverend Lovejoy, Judge Synder, Dr. Hibbert, Nedward Flanders, Sr. and various others

=== Supporting cast ===
- Chris Edgerly as additional characters
- Pamela Hayden as Milhouse Van Houten, Jimbo Jones, Rod Flanders, Janey Powell, Capri Flanders and various others
- Tress MacNeille as Dolph Shapiro, Lunchlady Dora, Agnes Skinner, Mrs. Muntz, Miss Springfield, Crazy Cat Lady, Brandine Spuckler, Manjula Nahasapeemapetilon, Allison Taylor, Shauna Chalmers, Cookie Kwan, Lindsay Naegle, Bernice Hibbert and various others
- Maggie Roswell as Elizabeth Hoover, Maude Flanders, Luann Van Houten and Helen Lovejoy
- Russi Taylor as Martin Prince, Sherri and Terri

Guest stars for the season included Marcia Wallace, Kiefer Sutherland, mountaineer Aron Ralston, Jane Lynch, chefs Anthony Bourdain and Gordon Ramsay, author Neil Gaiman, Andy García, Joan Rivers, Armie Hammer, Jeremy Irons, Michael Cera, and artist Shepard Fairey.

== Episodes ==
No. overall	No. in season	Title	Directed by	Written by	Original release date	Prod. code	U.S. viewers (millions)
487	1	"The Falcon and the D'ohman"	Matthew Nastuk	Justin Hurwitz	September 25, 2011	NABF16	8.08
Homer befriends the nuclear plant's newest hire, a security guard who was a CIA agent. He is haunted by past missions and is fired after attacking Mr. Burns. A Ukrainian gang learns of the agent's location and kidnaps Homer to get to him. The agent rescues Homer, and kills them. To thank him, Marge gets him a new job at the DMV. Ned Flanders and Edna Krabappel are shown to still be dating each other. Guest stars: Tom Colicchio, Kevin Michael Richardson and Kiefer Sutherland
488	2	"Bart Stops to Smell the Roosevelts"	Steven Dean Moore	Tim Long	October 2, 2011	NABF17	6.19
Principal Skinner challenges Superintendent Chalmers to get Bart and his classmates to be excited about learning after Bart's latest pranks, and he finds it in the form of teaching Bart about the life and times of Theodore Roosevelt. During an unauthorized field trip, Nelson is injured, so Chalmers is fired. Bart and his classmates hold the school hostage and demand Chalmers be reinstated. In the standoff, the police accidentally shoot the state comptroller, and the lawsuit pays for Nelson's injury, resulting in Chalmers' return. Guest stars: John Kricfalusi (credited for animating this episode's couch gag, his first and only other couch gag until season 27's Treehouse of Horror XXVI) and Theodore Roosevelt (through archival footage and audio recordings)
489	3	"Treehouse of Horror XXII"	Matthew Faughnan	Carolyn Omine	October 30, 2011	NABF19	8.10
In this year's introduction, Homer is charged by Marge to dispose of the candies in a canyon, but he falls and finds that his arm is pinned under a boulder which stops him from grabbing the candies, so he makes a 911 call but when he hears that help will only arrive in 20 minutes, he chooses to bite his arm off to find that the candies have been replaced by vegetables. In "The Diving Bell and the Butterball," Homer finds himself paralyzed by a spider bite and discovers a new, smelly way to communicate. Next, Flanders gets a call from God to rid the world of sinners by murdering them in '"Dial D for Diddly." Finally, Bart and Milhouse must infiltrate an alien planet by posing as the natives in the Avatar parody, "In the Na'vi." Guest stars: Jackie Mason and Aron Ralston as the 911 operator.
490	4	"Replaceable You"	Mark Kirkland	Stephanie Gillis	November 6, 2011	NABF21	8.00
Homer gets a new assistant named Roz who takes his job by reporting on his behavior. Ned encountered Roz before and says she does not like physical contact. He manipulates Mr. Burns into hugging her, and she attacks him. She is fired and Homer gets his job back. Meanwhile, Bart and Martin create a robot seal that becomes a hit with the elderly crowd. When the funeral industry learns that the seals make them healthier, they tamper with the seals to make the elderly miserable. Bart and Martin have Professor Frink help them return the seals to their previous state. Guest star: Jane Lynch
491	5	"The Food Wife"	Timothy Bailey	Matt Selman	November 13, 2011	NABF20	7.50
Tired of doing "mom" things and being much less fun for the kids than Homer, Marge takes the kids out to an Ethiopian restaurant and enjoys the food so much that she starts a food blog with Bart and Lisa, which hurts Homer's feelings. They are invited to a new restaurant. Fearing Homer will be more popular if he comes, Marge sends him to the wrong address, which is a meth lab. Marge feels guilty and rescues Homer after he is caught in a shootout with the police. Guest stars: Gordon Ramsay, Mario Batali, Anthony Bourdain, Tim Heidecker and Eric Wareheim
492	6	"The Book Job"	Bob Anderson	Dan Vebber	November 20, 2011	NABF22	5.77
When Lisa discovers that her favorite book is ghost-written by a group of publishers with an actress as the "author," Homer and Bart are inspired to do the same by getting a group of people to write a fantasy novel about trolls in a prestigious academy. Lisa struggles to write her own book and agrees to be the fake author of Homer's group's book. When the publisher changes the subject from trolls to vampires, they try to stop them by infiltrating the printers. However, Lisa instead changes the subject back to trolls and allows the book to be published. Moreover, she unknowingly changes the author to someone else, leaving her without credit. Guest stars: Andy García and Neil Gaiman
493	7	"The Man in the Blue Flannel Pants"	Steven Dean Moore	Jeff Westbrook	November 27, 2011	PABF01	5.61
Homer becomes Mr. Burns' accountant executive after a successful launch party for Absolut Krusty. Robert Marlow, a seasoned account veteran, takes Homer under his wing and shows Homer what the high life is like in the corner office, but long hours at the office become the norm. When Marge forces him to go on a vacation with his family, he also takes his co-workers there as a company retreat. When he is discovered and is forced to choose, he chooses his family and is sent back to his old job. Guest stars: Kevin Michael Richardson, John Slattery and Matthew Weiner
494	8	"The Ten-Per-Cent Solution"	Mike Frank Polcino	Deb Lacusta & Dan Castellaneta	December 4, 2011	PABF02	9.00
Krusty the Clown's show gets canceled because of its dated references. Krusty reunites with his original agent and bitter former lover Annie Dubinsky. Krusty start performing a show for adults, and his success leads him to a show on cable television. Krusty's retro comedy show reboot is deemed a critical success, but executives tell Krusty to fire Annie for her behavior. He refuses and quits in solidarity. Guest stars: Kevin Dillon, Janeane Garofalo, Jackie Mason and Joan Rivers
495	9	"Holidays of Future Passed"	Rob Oliver	J. Stewart Burns	December 11, 2011	NABF18	6.43
The latest "look-into-the-future" episode sees Bart as a deadbeat dad living in Springfield Elementary (which is now an apartment complex instead of a school) and trying to be a good dad to the children he had with Jenda from "Future-Drama". Meanwhile, a pregnant, unwed Maggie (who is now a pop singing superstar) goes into labor while on her way to family dinner and Lisa tries to find a common bond with her rebellious teenage daughter, Zia.
496	10	"Politically Inept, with Homer Simpson"	Mark Kirkland	John Frink	January 8, 2012	PABF03	5.07
Video footage of Homer ranting about being harassed by TSA agents and forced to sit on a grounded plane for seven hours (due to airport incompetence) goes viral and lands Homer on cable television as a political pundit with his own show. But when he stirs up mixed emotions with his planned endorsement of the next GOP Presidential candidate, Marge and Lisa worry that Homer's opinion and influence might be more powerful than he realizes. Guest stars: Ted Nugent and Dana Gould
497	11	"The D'oh-cial Network"	Chris Clements	J. Stewart Burns	January 15, 2012	PABF04	11.48
Lisa wants to spend time with her schoolmates but they decline the offer. She wants more friends, so she starts her own social network website called SpringFace to gets more friends. The service turns everyone into an online addict, which causes destruction when they are distracted. The court forces her to shut it down, but she finds some kids who invite her to play with them. A short story follows, showing Bart and Milhouse covering the school in toilet paper and its consequences. Guest stars: Armie Hammer, David Letterman
498	12	"Moe Goes from Rags to Riches"	Bob Anderson	Tim Long	January 29, 2012	PABF05	5.03
Moe's bar rag tells the story of how it went from being part of a medieval tapestry to being Moe's most used prop. Meanwhile, Milhouse is upset with Bart after he compares Milhouse to Moe's bar rag. He asks for forgiveness. Bart has Drederick Tatum punch him as a sign of good faith, and Milhouse forgives him. Later, Moe's rag is stolen, but he finds that Marge has cleaned it for him. He sees that the Simpsons are his friends, and he gives the rag to Santa's Little Helper. Guest star: Jeremy Irons
499	13	"The Daughter Also Rises"	Chuck Sheetz	Rob LaZebnik	February 12, 2012	PABF06	4.26
Lisa falls in love with Nick, an intellectual romantic. Marge tells her not to spend too much time with him, but Grampa helps them be together. Marge goes after them, and they break up when they cannot commit to each other. Marge says that she will always love Lisa. Meanwhile, Bart and Milhouse team up with the gang from MythCrackers to debunk some urban schoolyard legends. However, when they get bored of the myths, they make up some new ones. Guest stars: Michael Cera, Jamie Hyneman and Adam Savage
500	14	"At Long Last Leave"	Matthew Nastuk	Michael Price	February 19, 2012	PABF07	5.77
After hiding in their basement, the Simpsons stumble upon a secret town meeting where everyone is voting to throw them out of Springfield. As a result, they find themselves in an off-the-grid community, and when Homer and Marge try to sneak back into Springfield, they are met with hostility from their former friends and neighbors and begin to appreciate their new and more accepting home. They leave after Marge reprimands them. Feeling guilty, the townspeople gradually move to the new community and eventually declare it the new Springfield. Guest stars: Julian Assange, Allison Krauss and Union Station, Kelsey Grammer and Jackie Mason: This is the show's 500th episode.
501	15	"Exit Through the Kwik-E-Mart"	Steven Dean Moore	Marc Wilmore	March 4, 2012	PABF09	5.09
After being forced to spend some time in a rabbit cage for a prank he didn't commit, Bart exacts revenge by spray painting unflattering caricatures of Homer all over town, which become a sensation with real-life graffiti artists Shepard Fairey, Ron English, Kenny Scharf, and Robbie Conal. They offer Bart his own art show. At the show, Bart is arrested because the artists were working undercover to identify Bart. He is punished by being put back in the rabbit cage. Meanwhile, Apu's Kwik-E-Mart is in danger of shutting down when it faces competition from a health-food supermarket. As it is about to shut down, it is saved when they learn that the supermarket was selling improper meat. Guest stars: Shepard Fairey, Ron English, Kenny Scharf and Robbie Conal
502	16	"How I Wet Your Mother"	Lance Kramer	Billy Kimball & Ian Maxtone-Graham	March 11, 2012	PABF08	4.97
In this Simpsonized parody of Inception, Homer develops a bed-wetting problem, which he thinks is karmic payback for getting everyone in trouble for stealing office supplies at work, but a trip through Homer's dreams reveals that Homer's embarrassing problem is connected with a childhood memory. As a child, Grampa took Homer fishing, but they returned home with no fish. Shortly after, Mona left them, and Homer believed that the lack of fish caused her to leave. A dream of Mona assures Homer that he is not to blame, and Homer stops his bed wetting. Guest stars: Glenn Close and David Byrne
503	17	"Them, Robot"	Mike Frank Polcino	Michael Price	March 18, 2012	PABF10	5.25
To get out of paying for employee drug tests, Mr. Burns fires all of his employees except for Homer, who is kept on as a scapegoat and replaces them with robot workers. Bored, Homer gives them personalities and learns that they must protect humans, including preventing Homer from drinking beer. As a result, Homer removes this impediment, which causes them to try to kill him. He asks Mr. Burns for help, but he is also put in danger. They are saved by the former plant employees, and Mr. Burns rehires them. Guest star: Brent Spiner
504	18	"Beware My Cheating Bart"	Mark Kirkland	Ben Joseph	April 15, 2012	PABF11	4.96
Bart is forced to stay with Jimbo's girlfriend, Shauna, as she watches a movie. They hang out afterwards, and after he helps her, she rewards him by showing him her breasts. They decide to have a secret relationship but Jimbo figures it out. Shauna chooses to break up with both of them, and Bart is punished by Jimbo. Meanwhile, Homer buys a state-of-the-art treadmill that gets wireless TV and uses the treadmill to binge-watch a "Lost"-style show rather than exercise. Annoyed with his theories about the show, Marge tells him all the answers, which angers Homer. She later makes it up to him. Guest star: Kevin Michael Richardson with a special couch gag done by Bill Plympton, his first one for the show.
505	19	"A Totally Fun Thing Bart Will Never Do Again"	Chris Clements	Matt Warburton	April 29, 2012	PABF12	5.00
To alleviate his boredom with life, Bart begs the family to go on a cruise trip, and the Simpsons sell their most prized possessions to pay for it. But when Bart realizes the trip only lasts a week and that his life will be nothing after that, he stages an announcement that a virus has spread on the mainland, and they must remain at sea. Conditions worsen as they are stranded until Marge and Lisa learn the truth. After telling the passengers, the Simpsons are abandoned in Antarctica. As they go to a research station for help, the family is angry at Bart, although he says their lives were better on the ship. They forgive him after they play on a slice made of ice. Guest star: Treat Williams and Steve Coogan
506	20	"The Spy Who Learned Me"	Bob Anderson	Marc Wilmore	May 6, 2012	PABF13	4.84
After a disastrous date night at the movies, Homer suffers a head injury the next day at work and, during his eight weeks off to recover, sees visions of a super-suave superspy named Stradivarius Cain. He gives Homer lessons on being the husband of Marge's dreams. When Marge learns that Homer has not been going to work, Homer tells her the truth, and Marge forgives him. Meanwhile, Nelson uses a cellular phone to take lunch money from students. Bart gets revenge on Nelson by giving him coupons for Krusty burgers, which make him fat. Lisa helps Nelson get back into better shape because she cares for him. Guest stars: Bryan Cranston and Eric Idle
507	21	"Ned 'n' Edna's Blend Agenda"	Chuck Sheetz	Jeff Westbrook	May 13, 2012	PABF15	4.07
Ned Flanders is injured as the town watches a play. Edna Krabappel wants to go with him to the hospital, and the town learns that they eloped after months of dating. Later, Edna sends Rod and Todd to public school because of their poor education at Christian school. Seeing Rod and Todd's personalities change and not trusting Edna's intentions, Ned stays with the Simpsons. He sees Homer and Marge fight and immediately make up. He sees that couples will always have disagreements and asks Edna for forgiveness.
508	22	"Lisa Goes Gaga"	Matthew Schofield	Tim Long	May 20, 2012	PABF14	4.82
Lisa is voted as the least popular student at school. She writes an anonymous blog to make herself popular. When Bart finds out, he outs her, which lowers her status even more. Lady Gaga is passing through Springfield and tries to cheer her up. Lisa ends up yelling at her, and she learns that she was holding in her anger. Lisa and Lady Gaga sing together, and they teach the townspeople to be true to themselves. Guest star: Lady Gaga

== Production ==
The season was ordered on November 11, 2010. Seven episodes were holdovers from the previous season. Al Jean continued his role as primary showrunner, a role he had since the thirteenth season. Starting this season, executive producer Matt Selman was also the showrunner for several episodes. This season featured the only episode written by Justin Hurwitz. It also featured the final episode written by Matt Warburton before leaving for the television series Community.

=== Viewer vote result ===
The season premiere episode "The Falcon and the D'ohman" features a reference to the previous episode of the series, the twenty-second season finale "The Ned-Liest Catch" that aired May 22, 2011. In that episode, the characters Ned Flanders and Edna Krabappel started dating. The episode ends with Homer and Marge Simpson giving the viewers a link to the official The Simpsons website, TheSimpsons.com, and encouraging them to go on the website and vote over the summer of 2011 on whether Ned and Edna should stay together. Executive producer Al Jean said in an interview that the writers decided it would not be interesting for them to do another episode where a relationship ended, and they thought it would be interesting "to see what people think, the Internet certainly has a lot of opinion on the show, might as well have them have their say". When asked why the writers thought Ned and Edna were the right characters for a cliffhanger like this, Jean said that "In life, unusual things happen. People couple together in ways you would not expect, and he's single and she's single. We thought it would be funny, the fact that they both have these connections to the Simpsons but they never really met or if they have met it was minimal." The result of the poll were revealed in "The Falcon and the D'ohman". According to Jean, the poll was "very strong in one direction". He assured in an interview before the result was presented that the poll was authentic and the writers would not undo the viewers' decision, and added that "What our fans have joined together, let no writer tear asunder."

=== Cancellation threat ===
20th Century Fox Television released a statement on October 4, 2011, saying that "23 seasons in, The Simpsons is as creatively vibrant as ever and beloved by millions around the world. We believe this brilliant series can and should continue, but we cannot produce future seasons under its current financial model. We are hopeful that we can reach an agreement with the voice cast that allows The Simpsons to go on entertaining audiences with original episodes for many years to come." One of the problems was that The Simpsons was possibly worth more cancelled than on the air. A 17-year-old syndication deal with local TV stations prohibits Fox from selling the show to cable networks. As long as The Simpsons still produces new episodes, Fox cannot break this deal. In the meantime, cable networks have grown to become just as big a market as the local TV stations. Another consideration was that Fox's parent company News Corporation was having meetings discussing the possibility of a cable channel that would only air The Simpsons episodes. Analysts consider a cancellation and subsequent second-run deal that includes cable networks to be worth $750 million. On this issue, Al Jean commented in an interview with TV Guide that "It's a big company, and there are definitely people whose interests would have been better served by ending it. Those interests were superseded because we're still valuable to the network in terms of our ratings."

For the negotiations, the studio requested that the cast members accept a 45% cut of their salaries so that more seasons could be produced after season 23, or else that season would be the series' last. The actors were willing to take a pay cut, but wanted a percentage of the back-end payments instead. At one point, Harry Shearer even offered a 70% pay cut in exchange for back-end percentages, but the studio was unwilling to make any deal involving back-end percentages. In the end, the studio and the actors reached a deal, in which the actors would take a pay cut of 30%, down to just over $300,000 per episode, renewing the show to its 25th season. As well as the voice actors, everybody involved in the show took a pay cut. This included the animators, writers, post-production crew and even Jean himself. The further use of digital animation also saved money, as the animation of the show became more efficient.

== Reception ==
=== Ratings ===
The season premiere episode "The Falcon and the D'ohman" originally aired on the Fox network in the United States on September 25, 2011. It was watched by approximately 8.08 million people during this broadcast. It received a 3.9 Nielsen rating in the demographic for adults aged 18–49, and a ten percent share. The ratings were up three percent compared to the last season's premiere. The Simpsons became the second highest-rated program in the 18–49 demographic in Fox's Animation Domination lineup that night, finishing before The Cleveland Show and American Dad! but after Family Guy. The Simpsons was, however, the most-watched show in the lineup in terms of total viewers.

For the 2011–2012 television season, the season earned a 3.3 rating in the 18-49 demographic, which was the 33rd best performing show. It averaged 6.95 million viewers, which was the 69th best performing show.

During the twenty-third season, the cost of a 30-second advertising spot would be $254,260 in an original broadcast. It is the fifth-most expensive show for advertisers on Fox, with only American Idol, The X Factor, Glee and Family Guy being more expensive.

=== Awards and nominations ===
At the 64th Primetime Creative Arts Emmy Awards, the season was nominated for Outstanding Animated Program for "Holidays of Future Passed," and Hank Azaria was nominated for Outstanding Voice-Over Performance for his work in "Moe Goes from Rags to Riches."

At the 65th Writers Guild of America Awards, writer Jeff Westbrook won the Writers Guild of America Award for Television: Animation for "Ned 'n' Edna's Blend Agenda." Writers Tim Long and J. Stewart Burns were also nominated for Writers Guild of America Awards for episodes written this season.

At the 39th Annie Awards, writer Carolyn Omine won for Outstanding Achievement for Writing for "Treehouse of Horror XXII." Annie Award nominations were also given to the animators for Production Design for "Moe Goes from Rags to Riches," to writers Billy Kimball and Ian Maxtone-Graham for Writing for "How I Wet Your Mother," and to the couch gag of "Beware My Cheating Bart" for Best Short Subject.

Writer Marc Wilmore won the NAACP Image Award for Outstanding Writing in a Comedy Series at the 44th NAACP Image Awards for "The Spy Who Learned Me."
