= The Spy Who Learned Me =

- The Simpsons episode
- Episode no.: Season 23; Episode 20
- Directed by: Bob Anderson
- Written by: Marc Wilmore
- Production code: PABF13
- Original air date: May 6, 2012

Guest appearances
- Bryan Cranston as Stradivarius Cain; Eric Idle as Declan Desmond

Episode features
- Couch gag: All the audience at the Springfield Stadium except Homer put pictures up to form a picture of a couch gag, then Homer puts his picture up.

Episode chronology
← Previous "A Totally Fun Thing Bart Will Never Do Again"	Next → "Ned 'n' Edna's Blend Agenda"
- The Simpsons season 23

"The Spy Who Learned Me" is the twentieth episode of the twenty-third season of the American animated television series The Simpsons. The episode was directed by Bob Anderson and written by Marc Wilmore. It originally aired on the Fox network in the United States on May 6, 2012.

In this episode, Homer, after a head injury, has visions of a spy who teaches him to be a better husband while Bart makes Nelson overweight as revenge for bullying him. Bryan Cranston and Eric Idle guest starred. The episode received mixed reviews. Writer Marc Wilmore won an NAACP Image Award for this episode.

== Plot ==
On their date night, Homer takes Marge to an action film featuring the legendary fictional spy character Stradivarius Cain, but Homer's endless series of humorous shout-outs during the film earn him as much contempt from Marge as they do kudos from Lenny and Carl. Marge makes it clear the next morning she is still angry at Homer, and he ends up feeling sad on the job—though he soon feels much worse after Mr. Burns accidentally drives into the ladder Homer was using to fix lights and Homer ends up getting a serious concussion. Mr. Burns reluctantly agrees with the concerns of Smithers (moral) and his lawyer (legal) and gives Homer eight weeks off with pay. When Homer goes home, however, Marge's disgust with him has been matched by the discontents Bart, Lisa, and Grandpa feel about other things, so Homer decides to keep his paid leave a secret. He pretends to go to work every day and initially has a lot of fun, but soon returns to melancholy over the poor state of affairs with Marge. He is then stunned to see Cain appear to him as an imaginary friend, who will tutor Homer on how to be irresistible to Marge, starting with a lesson in confidence at a local restaurant that ends with Homer winning over the lovely wife of an angry drug lord who swears revenge. Marge learns from Lenny that Homer was out on leave, and becomes enraged at him, only for Homer to completely defuse her anger by taking Cain's advice and telling Marge the truth (that he lied about going to work, and used the time to learn to be a better husband). When they head out for a night of dancing, Montana spots them and plans to kill Homer, but Homer uses a line about lovely eyes that leads to him being forgiven. Marge then asks Homer seductively how much more leave time he has, but Homer chuckles that his paid vacation ended last week, and they just have to wait for the call from Human Resources.

Meanwhile, a new smartphone-scanning policy at Springfield Elementary brings Nelson's lunch-money shakedown to a new level and leads Bart to plan revenge. When he watches Declan Desmond's muckraking documentary Do You Want LIES With That? about the Krusty Burger's shady dealings and unethical food practices, he realizes eating nothing but Krusty's fast food will be quite bad for Nelson, and gives the bully a free coupon book that leads to Nelson becoming horrifically out of shape and unhealthy. Lisa then takes Nelson to show his terrible fate at Krusty's, so Krusty offers Nelson free time with his personal trainer. Nelson ends up in great shape and ready to beat up more nerds than ever, but Lisa notes "he is tough on nerds, but easy on the eyes" as Bart stares at her in disbelief.

== Production ==
In August 2011, Entertainment Weekly reported that Bryan Cranston would guest star as Stradivarius Cain, a spy that Homer sees after a head injury. In April 2012, a first look was shown of Cain with Homer.

== Cultural references ==
Stradivarius Cain is a take on James Bond. The subplot's documentary is a parody of Morgan Spurlock’s 2004 film, Super Size Me.

== Reception ==
=== Viewing figures ===
The episode earned a 2.2 rating with a 6 share and 4.84 million viewers, which was the second-most watched show on Fox that night.

=== Critical response ===
Rowan Kaiser of The A.V. Club gave the episode a B+ grade, stating, "'The Spy Who Learned Me' works, and works well. The way Homer annoys Marge—by making horrible jokes during a terrible movie while being egged on by Lenny and Carl—is good fun. It allows the show to do two of the things it's always been best at: horrible puns and movie parodies."

Teresa Lopez of TV Fanatic gave the episode 3.5 out of 5 stars. She did not enjoy the primary plot of Homer's concussion and hallucinations. However, she thought the subplot with the Super Size Me parody was hilarious.

=== Awards and nominations ===
Writer Marc Wilmore won the NAACP Image Award for Outstanding Writing in a Comedy Series at the 44th NAACP Image Awards for this episode.
