= Beware My Cheating Bart =

- The Simpsons episode
- Episode no.: Season 23; Episode 18
- Directed by: Mark Kirkland
- Written by: Ben Joseph
- Production code: PABF11
- Original air date: April 15, 2012

Guest appearance
- Kevin Michael Richardson as the Mall Cop

Episode features
- Chalkboard gag: "The true location of Springfield is in any state but yours"
- Couch gag: In Bill Plympton's first couch gag for the show, Homer falls in love with the couch, then leaves it when he falls for Marge, followed by the couch's descent into stripping and prostitution in order to support itself and its baby couch. When the couch tries to commit suicide by throwing itself into a garbage truck, Homer saves it and takes it home to the family; the baby couch becomes Maggie's play chair.

Episode chronology
← Previous "Them, Robot"	Next → "A Totally Fun Thing Bart Will Never Do Again"
- The Simpsons season 23

"Beware My Cheating Bart" is the eighteenth episode of the twenty-third season of the American animated television series The Simpsons. The episode was directed by Mark Kirkland and written by Ben Joseph. It originally aired on the Fox network in the United States on April 15, 2012. The title refers to the song "Be Still My Beating Heart" by Sting.

In this episode, Bart starts a secret relationship with Shauna Chalmers while Homer starts developing theories while watching an old mystery television series. The episode received mixed reviews.

== Plot ==
During a day out in the mall, Homer chooses to drop Milhouse and Bart at a children's movie so he can eat at the food court. The boys run into the bullies (who are there to see a gory Hong Kong horror film remake called "Crawlspace") and Bart is forced to chaperone Jimbo Jones' girlfriend Shauna while she sees a Jennifer Aniston movie. Both of them leave shortly after seeing the only part of the movie that appeals to Shauna (the man's ass) and they hang out in the mall. Bart covers for Shauna when she shoplifts and when they escape from an incompetent mall cop, Shauna says that Bart is pretty cool and shows her appreciation by flashing her breasts in front of him, leaving him both traumatized and smitten with her. Both decide to enter a romantic relationship behind Jimbo's back, but he figures out what's going on soon afterwards. Both attempt to hide from a vengeful Jimbo at Comic Book Guy's store, while the bully decides to stake out Bart's home with help from an oblivious Marge, leaving Bart to come home and face Jimbo's wrath. Shauna breaks up with both of them after some good advice from Lisa, and Bart receives his punishment (being held upside down from his treehouse to have the "fear of God put into him") from Jimbo.

Meanwhile, Homer is persuaded to buy a state-of-the-art treadmill from a crafty salesman. When Lisa shows Homer that he can access television shows wirelessly, he takes advantage of the machine and develops an obsession with watching an old television show called Stranded, instead of working out. Eventually Marge, in a fit of rage, returns the treadmill leading Homer to catch up on the latest episodes physically, gives away all the spoilers of the episodes Homer has not watched yet. He is initially furious at Marge and hints at their marriage failing, but a romantic evening planned by her resolves matters.

== Production ==
The original U.S. broadcast version contained a title card with "Now Entering Oregon" under the title followed by the chalkboard gag saying "The true location of Springfield is in any state but yours." It was a response to reactions to a Matt Groening interview in which he revealed that the name of Springfield was inspired by Springfield, Oregon, which was widely misinterpreted as Groening revealing that The Simpsons' Springfield was located in Oregon. Executive producer Al Jean stated that it was misinterpretation of something Groening had said for decades in that parts of the show were inspired by his childhood in Oregon. Prior to the episode's airing, he also joked that they would address it in this episode.

The couch gag was created by animator Bill Plympton. Jean described the gag as "sweet" where it shows Homer having a previous romantic relationship with the couch. Plympton was the third person to guest-direct a couch gag for the show, after Banksy's opening for Season 22's "MoneyBart" and John Kricfalusi's first opening for Season 23's "Bart Stops to Smell the Roosevelts".

== Cultural references ==
The television show Stranded that Homer watches is a parody of the television series Lost. Bart and Shauna's dating montage has scenes that parody the films The Graduate and Midnight Cowboy.

== Reception ==
=== Viewing figures ===
The episode originally aired on the Fox network in the United States on April 15, 2012. It was watched by approximately 4.864 million people during this broadcast.

=== Critical response ===
Rowan Kaiser of The A.V. Club gave the episode a C+, praising the couch gag "in an episode that was anything but memorable otherwise."

Teresa Lopez of TV Fanatic gave the episode 3.5 out of 5 stars. She found the idea of Shauna showing her breast to Bart to be disturbing and that the courtship was not believable. She highlighted the subplot of Homer watching a parody of Lost.

=== Awards and nominations ===
The couch gag was nominated for Best Animated Short Subject at the 40th Annie Awards.
