= Exit Through the Kwik-E-Mart =

- The Simpsons episode
- Episode no.: Season 23; Episode 15
- Directed by: Steven Dean Moore
- Written by: Marc Wilmore
- Production code: PABF09
- Original air date: March 4, 2012

Guest appearances
- Shepard Fairey, Ron English, Kenny Scharf, Robbie Conal as themselves; Nicholas McKaig performs over the closing credits

Episode features
- Couch gag: A spoof of the Game of Thrones opening sequence.

Episode chronology
| ← Previous "At Long Last Leave" | Next → "How I Wet Your Mother" |
- The Simpsons season 23

"Exit Through the Kwik-E-Mart" is the fifteenth episode of the twenty-third season of the American animated television series The Simpsons, and the 501st episode overall. It originally aired on the Fox network in the United States on March 4, 2012. In the episode, Bart is punished by Homer after letting a rabbit loose in the house. He gets revenge on his father by spray-painting images of him with the word "dope" all over Springfield. Street artist Shepard Fairey encounters Bart one night and offers him a gallery show of Bart's artworks. However, Chief Wiggum suddenly appears during the show and arrests Bart for covering the town in graffiti. It turns out that Fairey is an undercover officer working for Wiggum.

The episode references the 2010 street art documentary Exit Through the Gift Shop by graffiti artist Banksy, and features guest appearances from street artists Ron English, Kenny Scharf, and Robbie Conal as themselves. Fairey, who is a long-time fan of The Simpsons, also guest starred in the episode as himself.

Around 5.09 million Americans tuned in to watch "Exit Through the Kwik-E-Mart" during its original broadcast.

Since then, the episode has received praise from television critics for its opening sequence, which parodies the opening sequence of the medieval fantasy television series Game of Thrones.

== Plot ==
As a birthday gift for Marge, Homer buys a blender designed by television chef Paula Paul. He goes to a health food store called Swapper Jack's, where Paula is giving away autographs, to have Paula sign it. Homer is impressed by the store and says he will not be shopping at the Kwik-E-Mart anymore. Apu, who is there to spy, overhears Homer and the two engage in a fight until the security guards grab hold of Apu and take him away. At the signing, Homer tells Paula that Marge is a big fan of hers. Paula decides that she will call Marge live during her upcoming show to wish her a happy birthday. Meanwhile, Bart gets his mother a rabbit for her birthday. The rabbit chews through the phone lines in the Simpsons' home, causing Marge to miss Paula's call. Paula becomes furious at Marge for not answering the phone as she embarrassed herself on her show. Homer punishes Bart by locking him up in the rabbit's cage.

To get revenge on Homer, Bart goes around Springfield spray-painting graffiti of Homer's face and the word "dope". When his work appears on the television news, it encourages Bart to create even more graffiti in the town. Street artists Shepard Fairey, Ron English, Kenny Scharf, and Robbie Conal encounter Bart one night when he is making some graffiti. The four tell Bart that they are impressed by his work and would like to showcase his art in a gallery show. At first Bart is unsure, but Bart remembers how Homer treated him, and then agrees. Meanwhile, the Kwik-E-Mart suffers because of the competition from Swapper Jack's. Apu ends up attempting to rob Swapper Jack's in a desperate measure, but the cashier (Snake Jailbird) convinces him to hand over the gun. Later, Apu is about to shut down the Kwik-E-Mart when his wife Manjula tells him that Swapper Jack's is closing because it was discovered they were selling monkey meat imported from Brazil as chicken.

Homer initially refuses to attend Bart's show because he discovers the artwork is an insult to him, but changes his mind after Bart apologizes and writes "I'm sorry" on the hood of Homer's car, instantly increasing its value. At the show, Chief Wiggum and the Springfield Police Department suddenly appear to arrest Bart for making graffiti throughout the town. It is revealed that the gallery show is a sham and that Fairey is an undercover officer who helped the police identify Bart as the graffiti artist that had been spray-painting Springfield. Since Bart is just a boy, he is not sent to jail. Instead, he is punished by once again being locked up in the rabbit cage. When Bart tells Wiggum that he has to go to the bathroom, Wiggum covers the cage with the blanket and finds Bart gone when he removes the blanket from the cage, upon which Bart has left an insulting graffito.

== Production ==
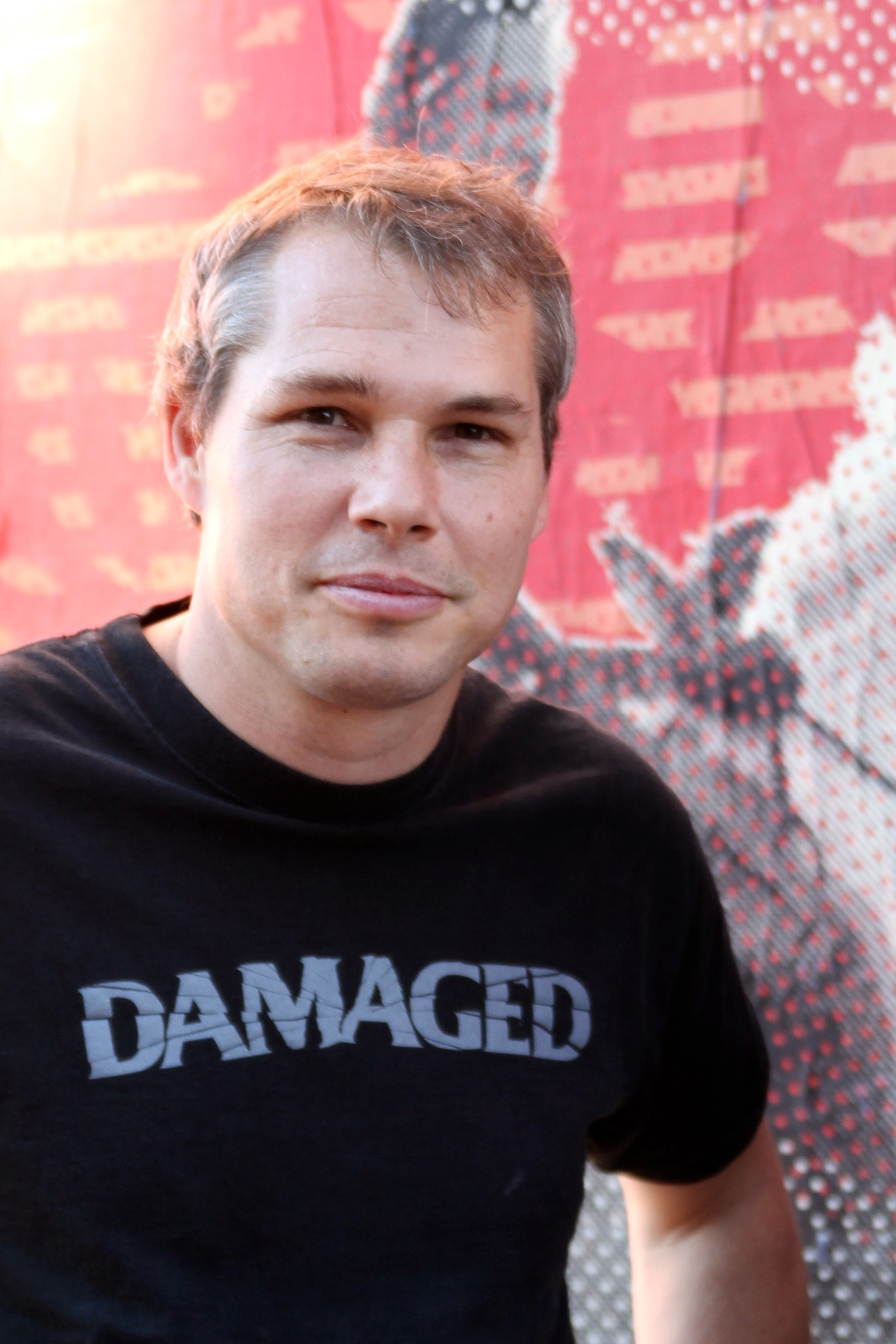
Artist Shepard Fairey, a fan of The Simpsons, starred in the episode as himself.

"Exit Through the Kwik-E-Mart" was written by Marc Wilmore and directed by Steven Dean Moore as part of the twenty-third season of The Simpsons (2011–12). It spoofs the debated status of street art as a true form of art. The title is a reference to Exit Through the Gift Shop, a 2010 street art documentary by graffiti artist Banksy who produced the opening sequence of an earlier Simpsons episode titled "MoneyBart" (2010). The Richard Hawley song "Tonight The Streets Are Ours", which is the theme song of Exit Through the Gift Shop, is included in the episode during a montage of Bart painting graffiti in Springfield. Hayden Childs of The A.V. Club noted in his review of "Exit Through the Kwik-E-Mart" that the "reveal that the art show was a police sting gives the show a moment to joke about the anti-art market theme from Exit Through The Gift Shop. Wiggum asks who would be stupid enough to pay for work that an amateur puts up for free in public, and the answer is, as in Banksy’s movie, the very wealthy, here represented by Mr. Burns."

American street artist Fairey guest starred in "Exit Through the Kwik-E-Mart" as himself. The graffiti art featuring Homer's face and the word "dope" that Bart creates in the episode is a reference to Fairey's Barack Obama "Hope" poster and his OBEY Giant image. Fairey has said that The Simpsons has been one of his favorite television shows since the early 1990s because of its "blend of humor and social commentary", and he felt "deeply honored" to be included in an episode. Fairey wrote on his website that "Part of being on The Simpsons, is you’re being honored as a reference point in culture." He described the plot of the episode as "great", adding that the staff members of the show "were kind enough to indulge a couple of my dialogue suggestions designed to make the social commentary more pointed (even though I had to make fun of myself to do so)." This was Fairey's first acting performance. Street artists English, Scharf, and Conal also guest starred in the episode as themselves.

The traditional Simpsons opening sequence was replaced in this episode with a redesigned version that spoofed the opening sequence of the HBO medieval fantasy series Game of Thrones. The Game of Thrones opening shows the various locations featured in the series on a three-dimensional map of the fictional continent Westeros. In the Simpsons opening, these locations were substituted with places in Springfield, and The Wall was replaced with the Simpson family's couch. The theme song featured in the Game of Thrones opening sequence was arranged by The Simpsons composer Alf Clausen and used in the Simpsons opening as well. Nicholas McKaig, known for uploading a cappella covers of famous songs on YouTube, performed the Simpsons theme song over the closing credits of "Exit Through the Kwik-E-Mart". He was recruited after a staff member of the show saw his cover of the Simpsons theme on YouTube.

== Release ==
"Exit Through the Kwik-E-Mart" was originally broadcast on the Fox network in the United States on March 4, 2012. It was watched by approximately 5.09 million people during this broadcast, and in the demographic for adults aged 18–49, the episode received a 2.5 Nielsen rating and a seven percent share.

The episode became the second highest-rated broadcast in Fox's Animation Domination lineup for the night in terms of both total viewers and in the 18–49 demographic. "Exit Through the Kwik-E-Mart" placed 25th in the ratings among all prime-time broadcasts in the 18–49 demographic, and seventh among all Fox prime-time broadcasts.

Writing for The A.V. Club, television reviewer Hayden Childs gave the episode a B, commenting that "Exit Through the Kwik-E-Mart" was "somewhat amusing and far more coherent than many recent episodes, but the satire is relatively mild. The episode curdles a bit while looking for a sweet ending, but it is otherwise solid enough."

Critics have praised the opening sequence that parodies Game of Thrones. Tim Surette of TV.com called it "one minute of genius", and MTV's Brandon Freeberg wrote: "Congratulations are in order for Matt Groening and his staff for really knocking this one out of the park." Jenna Busch of Zap2it and Kelly West of Cinema Blend, both fans of Game of Thrones, named the opening the best in the history of the show. IGN's Eric Goldman commented: "Ah, The Simpsons. Always there for us with clever/loving parody of something we all love. Such was the case last night, when the animated series opened with an epic opening credit sequence that gave us the Springfield-inspired version of the terrific Game of Thrones credits."
