= A Totally Fun Thing Bart Will Never Do Again =

- The Simpsons episode
- Episode no.: Season 23; Episode 19
- Directed by: Chris Clements
- Written by: Matt Warburton
- Production code: PABF12
- Original air date: April 29, 2012

Guest appearances
- Steve Coogan as Rowan Priddis; Treat Williams as himself and film character William Sullivan

Episode features
- Couch gag: Everyone and everything is represented as a word cloud.

Episode chronology
← Previous "Beware My Cheating Bart"	Next → "The Spy Who Learned Me"
- The Simpsons season 23

"A Totally Fun Thing Bart Will Never Do Again" is the nineteenth episode of the twenty-third season of the American animated television series The Simpsons. It originally aired on the Fox network in the United States on April 29, 2012. In the episode, the Simpson family goes on a cruise after being convinced by a bored Bart. He enjoys himself on the vacation until Rowan Priddis, the director of the cruise, performs a song called "Enjoy It While You Can" that makes him realize the cruise is soon to be over and he has to return to his boring life. Bart decides to trick the crew and the passengers on the ship that the world is coming to an end back on land because of a pandemic and that the ship therefore has to stay out at sea. He manages to do this with the help of a large television screen, on which he displays a scene from the film The Pandora Strain that features a general named William Sullivan warning humanity about a deadly virus.

Treat Williams guest starred in the episode as film character William Sullivan, while Steve Coogan made a guest appearance as the cruise director Rowan Priddis. "Enjoy It While You Can" was produced for the episode by Broadway composer Robert Lopez, who also co-wrote the song with the writers of The Simpsons. Other songs played in the episode include "Boy from School" by Hot Chip and "Winter's Love" by Animal Collective.

Since airing, "A Totally Fun Thing Bart Will Never Do Again" has received generally positive reviews from television critics, being praised for showing an emotional side of Bart. Around five million viewers tuned in to watch the episode during its original US broadcast.

== Plot ==
After another boring week in his life, Bart sees a commercial on television for a fun cruise and begs Homer and Marge for a family vacation. They tell him that the family is low on cash, so Bart chooses to sell everything he owns to fund the vacation himself. He comes up well short of the needed amount, so Marge and Lisa help by selling one valuable item apiece. Together the three have enough money to book the family into an economy cabin; once the cruise starts, though, a series of free upgrades places them in a deluxe cabin. They enjoy the wide range of activities on board, but Bart's spirits sink when he hears the cruise director, Rowan Priddis, sing a song to the passengers telling them to enjoy the rest of the cruise while they can before they go back to their normal lives. Bart fears that the remainder of his life will be painfully boring and decides to make the vacation last forever.

Later, a huge onboard television screen displays an emergency message from a military officer, warning the crew and passengers about a deadly virus that has started to spread on the mainland. He says that all ships must remain at sea to ensure that humanity survives. The message is actually taken from a movie in the Simpson cabin's DVD library, set up by Bart to broadcast all over the ship. He also disables communications with the mainland by pouring hot fudge on a control panel. As the ship stays at sea over the next twelve days, it falls into disrepair. Conditions deteriorate and the food supply starts to run out. Eventually, the cruise turns into something similar to a post-apocalyptic civilization with gladiator arenas, marauders, capital punishment, and Priddis claiming kingship over the passengers.

Marge and Lisa discover Bart's deception and inform the passengers that the virus is a hoax. As punishment, the furious passengers maroon the Simpsons in Antarctica and head home. While hiking toward a research station for help, the family is furious at Bart and throw snowballs at him. Lisa tells Bart that what he did was "the most selfish thing he's done", only to be reminded that Lisa had friends and Homer and Marge were happier as a couple. They notice a group of penguins and Lisa is fascinated by the chance to see them up close, but Bart thinks that their lives are boring and says that the ice slide they are riding down is just one isolated moment of fun. Lisa tells him that aside from all the things that happen throughout your life, capturing and enjoying the best moments of it can make it fun and Bart realizes she is right after Homer pushes him down the ice slide with the whole family joining in. The final scene is a flash-forward to an elderly Bart in a retirement home, fondly looking back at various photos of fun moments throughout his life.

== Production ==
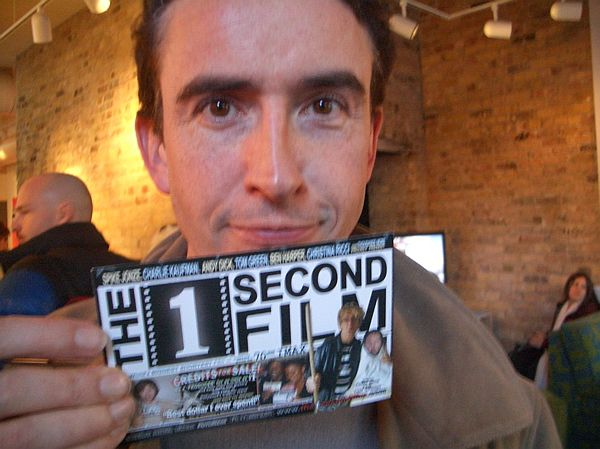
Steve Coogan voices Rowan Priddis in this episode.

"A Totally Fun Thing Bart Will Never Do Again" was written by Matt Warburton and directed by Chris Clements as part of the 23rd season of The Simpsons (2011–12). The title and parts of the plot are a reference to the 1997 essay "A Supposedly Fun Thing I'll Never Do Again" by American writer David Foster Wallace that describes his experiences on a cruise. In one scene, a character appears in the background that supposedly resembles Foster Wallace. American actor Treat Williams guest starred in the episode as himself playing William Sullivan, the character in the film The Pandora Strain that Bart uses to trick everyone into believing a deadly virus has actually spread.

A guest appearance by English actor and comedian Steve Coogan as Rowan Priddis, the director of the cruise, is also featured. In the episode, when the Simpsons are having dinner at the restaurant on the ship, the character makes a stage performance of a song called "Enjoy It While You Can" that prompts Bart to make sure the cruise lasts forever. This song was a contribution by Tony Award-winning Broadway composer and lyricist Robert Lopez, who produced it in New York City in 2011 for the episode. Coogan recorded the song in New York as well. The writers of the show provided Lopez their suggestion for the song's lyrics, which "he then tweaked", according to William Keck of TV Guide. Lopez told Keck that he and the Simpsons staff decided to create something "cheesy that actually could be performed on a cruise ship. We went in a Carnival Cruise, 'Feelin' Hot Hot Hot' direction." According to The Simpsons music editor Chris Ledesma, Lopez produced "Enjoy It While You Can" with a "synthesizer band" and The Simpsons composer Alf Clausen "added a Vegas-style house orchestra arrangement for the final version."

The episode features two songs in addition to "Enjoy It While You Can". "Boy from School" by English electronic music band Hot Chip is played at the start of the episode during a montage that shows a boring week in the life of Bart, including his time at school. When the Simpsons go down the penguins' ice slide at the end of the episode, "Winter's Love" by American neo-psychedelia band Animal Collective is heard. "A Totally Fun Thing Bart Will Never Do Again" also includes two classical music pieces. Warburton decided to use French composer François-Adrien Boieldieu's "Concerto for Harp and Strings" for the first shot of the cruise ship in the episode. As described by Ledesma on his blog, this piece reappeared in a "more dire and dark treatment" later in the episode during a shot of the rundown ship. Russian composer Mikhail Glinka's overture from his Ruslan and Lyudmila opera is played over a montage that shows Bart taking part in the fun activities on the cruise.

== Release ==
The episode originally aired on the Fox network in the United States on April 29, 2012. It was watched by approximately five million people during this broadcast, and in the demographic for adults aged 18–49, the episode received a 2.3 Nielsen rating and a seven percent share. The episode became the second highest-rated broadcast in Fox's Animation Domination lineup that night in terms of both total viewers and in the 18–49 demographic. For the week of April 23–29, 2012, "A Totally Fun Thing Bart Will Never Do Again" placed 17th in the ratings among all prime-time broadcasts in the 18–49 demographic, and sixth among all Fox prime-time broadcasts.

Reception of the episode by television critics has been generally positive. Rowan Kaiser of The A.V. Club praised the episode, giving it an A− and commented that it is "good to see 'The Simpsons' try an ambitious episode, and great to see those ambitions largely fulfilled." He added that episodes that "give Bart extra depth ('Bart Sells His Soul' especially) are among my favorite 'Simpsons' half-hours," and noted that this episode features "a side of Bart that we rarely see: someone living outside the moment. Imagining himself on his deathbed and thinking of how his whole life outside of the cruise was wasted is the sort of device typically reserved for the Simpson women, particularly Lisa."

Alan Sepinwall of HitFix wrote that in the episode there "are elements that will be familiar – it's another episode where a Simpson family vacation verges on disaster – but the main emotional storyline involving Bart is one 'The Simpsons' hasn't touched on before, as a fantastic luxury cruise makes him uneasy about the state of the rest of his life." Sepinwall concluded that he is "always a fan of single-story Simpsons episodes, as well as ones built around an emotional issue facing a member of the family, and this has both – in addition to being funny and sweet and clever in its depiction of the Best Cruise Ever."
