= At Long Last Leave =

- The Simpsons episode
- Episode no.: Season 23; Episode 14
- Directed by: Matthew Nastuk
- Written by: Michael Price
- Production code: PABF07
- Original air date: February 19, 2012

Guest appearances
- Julian Assange as himself; Kelsey Grammer as Sideshow Bob; Jackie Mason as Rabbi Krustofski; Alison Krauss and Union Station (performing the Simpsons theme song)

Episode features
- Chalkboard gag: "Bart's earned a day off" (written by Milhouse) / "I (heart symbol) the breakdown of society (graffitied, in-episode)
- Couch gag: A frame-by-frame montage of couch gags from previous episodes pulls back into a photomosaic of the number "500", then ends with Homer strangling Bart, saying his famous quote "Why you little!"; both are wearing tuxedos.

Episode chronology
← Previous "The Daughter Also Rises"	Next → "Exit Through the Kwik-E-Mart"
- The Simpsons season 23

"At Long Last Leave" is the fourteenth episode of the twenty-third season of the American animated television series The Simpsons, and the 500th episode overall of the series, first broadcast on February 19, 2012. In this episode, the Simpsons discover that the inhabitants of Springfield have grown tired of them and have secretly decided to throw them out of the city. After being evicted from Springfield, the family members end up in a rugged place without rules and regulations called the Outlands. There, they briefly come across their neighbor Julian Assange, who created WikiLeaks. Assange guest-starred in the episode as himself and recorded his lines over the phone while under house arrest in Britain, while waiting for the results of Assange v Swedish Prosecution Authority.

Michael Price wrote the episode without the intention of it becoming the 500th episode and felt honored when it was selected for the milestone. Television critics have given the episode generally positive reviews, particularly praising it for a montage of the series' couch gags that was included in the opening sequence. The storyline of "At Long Last Leave" has, however, received criticism for being similar to the main story structure previously done in The Simpsons Movie.

During its original airing on the Fox network in the United States on February 19, 2012, the episode was watched by about 5.77 million people and received a 2.6 Nielsen rating in the demographic for adults aged 18–49.

Before this broadcast, Fox promoted the 500th episode milestone by arranging an attempt to break the Guinness World Record for longest continuous television viewing. A hundred fans of The Simpsons were invited to watch a marathon of the series' episodes, starting on February 8, 2012. The record was broken 86 hours and 37 minutes later on February 12, 2012, with only two fans left watching the marathon.

== Plot ==
The Simpson family is advised of a citywide nuclear safety drill and all the inhabitants of Springfield are told to stay in their basements for three hours. The family members quickly become bored in the basement and decide to leave the house and go see the empty city. As they walk through Springfield, they see an unusual number of cars parked by the City Hall. The Simpsons go in and discover that everyone in town has gathered for a secret town meeting and have voted unanimously to kick them out of Springfield forever. Mayor Quimby reveals that the city has gone bankrupt due to the constant cleaning up of the family's shenanigans over the years, ranging from Homer's drunken antics, Bart's various pranks, and Lisa's environmental concerns. Marge delivers a heart-felt plea to the residents to let the Simpsons live in the one place they call home, but they refuse, with Quimby declaring her the "worst Simpson" for always trying to see the family in a positive light. Ned attempts to defend the Simpsons by claiming no one should be quick to judge without being judged themselves. Quimby, having anticipated this, decides to throw him out of the meeting in response.

A big celebration is held by the city's population as the Simpsons are officially evicted from Springfield, which Ned and his family refuses to attend after withdrawing their objection. When the family drives out into the middle of nowhere at night with no place to stay, they come across a man who takes them to a county called the Outlands, which is a dirty, run-down place where there are no rules and regulations. The Simpsons settle in the Outlands and meet Julian Assange—their unfriendly next-door neighbor who operates the WikiLeaks Headquarters there.

While the rest of the family gets used to their new home and are much happier, Marge struggles with her new life. When they confront her about it, the family realize that Marge is just homesick for Springfield and misses their former neighbors. Despite Bart's warning to stay away from Springfield, Homer sneaks her back there one night under the disguise of Mr. Burns and Smithers, and they spend the night getting drunk and subsequently having drunken sex in their old abandoned home. However, Chief Wiggum sees through their disguises, and rallies the people of Springfield to the Simpson home to capture Homer and Marge. Homer is extremely angered by this and furiously insults the residents for being jerks to them in not allowing them to see their former town. The citizens are offended by his crude nature and order for the police to shoot him in response to him insulting their town, but Marge stuns the citizens by saying to not bother doing so because she has something she would like to tell the town before she and Homer leave. Shocked by her newfound assertive personality, Wiggum, Eddie and Lou immediately lower their guns. Marge reprimands the townsfolk in Springfield for their behavior in hating her family for being who they are and exploring their interests, stating that she and Homer came back to visit their old home here because she was homesick, only to see just how disillusioned and judgmental the residents of Springfield are in not allowing her family any decency to be themselves. She announces that the residents exiling her family out of town is the best thing that happened to them, and she'd rather return to the Outlands with her loving family because they found a place to live in. She also claims the Outlands' townsfolk are much better as a community then the residents in Springfield because they encourage the Simpsons to be themselves and to explore their interest without worry of hate, judgment and resentment from others. As Marge and Homer march through the visibly disillusioned crowd and return to the Outlands, the citizens regret exiling the Simpsons and realize they must do something to win them back.

Back in the Simpsons' new home, Marge is settling in well and happily plants her new garden. Bart and Maggie discover Lenny and Carl sneaking in and attack them. Homer appears on his ATV and demands to know why they here. Lenny and Carl admit they've felt terrible in helping the townsfolk banish the Simpsons from Springfield and how worse it was since then. They tell the family they long to start a new life in the Outlands after hearing Marge point out the flaws of each resident. Soon, Moe appears and opens Moe's Cavern, which Homer, Lenny and Carl patronize. Mayor Quimby, and many other Springfield residents show up, wishing to abandon their lives in Springfield and start over in the Outlands. Soon, all of Springfield moves there to start new lives with the Simpsons, and they begin rebuilding a new city which Quimby names Springfield. This is against Marge's wishes, admitting she has always disliked the corruption there and the man who befriended the Simpsons leaves. Principal Skinner is left alone in the old Springfield until Bart picks him up via a helicopter.

== Production ==
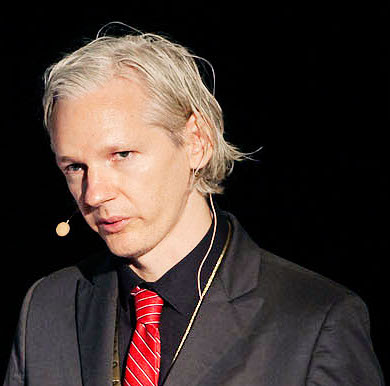
Julian Assange, the founder of website WikiLeaks, appeared in the episode.

"At Long Last Leave", which is the 500th episode of The Simpsons, was written by Michael Price. The Simpsons' showrunner Al Jean has described it as "a tribute to people who love the show." Being a fan of musical theater, Price titled the episode in reference to the Cole Porter song "At Long Last Love". Price did not write "At Long Last Leave" with the intention of it becoming the 500th episode; that decision was made afterwards when the staff members realized the story offered an opportunity for a look-back at the history of the Simpson family. He said in an interview with the magazine Channel Guide that he was "deeply honored" when his episode was selected for the milestone. As acknowledged by Price in that interview, the plot of the episode features similarities to the 2007 film The Simpsons Movie, in which the Simpsons are forced to flee to Alaska after Homer angers the townspeople in Springfield by polluting a lake. However, Price commented that "I think it's different from the movie in that it sort of does reference back the entire history of the show, the collective experience of Springfield vis-a-vis the Simpsons, whereas the movie they were forced to run away due to that very specific thing". He further noted that despite the similarities "we [the staff] liked it enough to go with it anyway." The plot was first announced to the press at San Diego Comic-Con on July 23, 2011, during a panel with the cast and crew of The Simpsons.

The episode features several guest appearances, with Kelsey Grammer and Jackie Mason returning as Sideshow Bob and Rabbi Krustofski, respectively. American musician Alison Krauss and her band Union Station recorded a bluegrass version of the Simpsons theme song that is played in the episode and over the closing credits.

Australian activist Julian Assange—the founder of WikiLeaks—appeared as himself. Many of his lines were written by Australian author Kathy Lette, who is one of Assange's friends. According to Lette, "Julian and The Simpsons producers asked me to rewrite his scene and dialogue. I guess they just wanted me to add a little Aussie irony to the script. Julian does not suffer from an irony deficiency! I used to write a sitcom for Columbia Pictures, the long-running series The Facts of Life, so the producers knew I could fire off a quip or two." In 2010, Swedish authorities issued a European Arrest Warrant to extradite Assange from Britain to Sweden for questioning in relation to sexual assault allegations made against him there. Assange was arrested in England, before being freed on conditional bail until a decision would be made as to whether or not he should be extradited to Sweden. Assange recorded his lines over the phone while under house arrest in England. Jean, who directed Assange's performance from Los Angeles, only acquired a phone number to call and received no information about the whereabouts of the activist. According to Jean in an interview with Entertainment Weekly, The Simpsons creator Matt Groening had found out through a rumor that Assange wanted to appear on the show. Casting director Bonnie Pietila was therefore given the task to contact Assange and make sure the guest appearance could happen. The episode features no reference to Assange's legal situation at the time of his recording. Jean commented that he is "a controversial figure, and there's a good reason he's controversial. There was discussion internally whether or not to have him on the show, but ultimately we went ahead and did it." Groening has said in an interview that "We [the staff] dare ourselves to do things and Julian Assange was a dare."

== Promotion ==
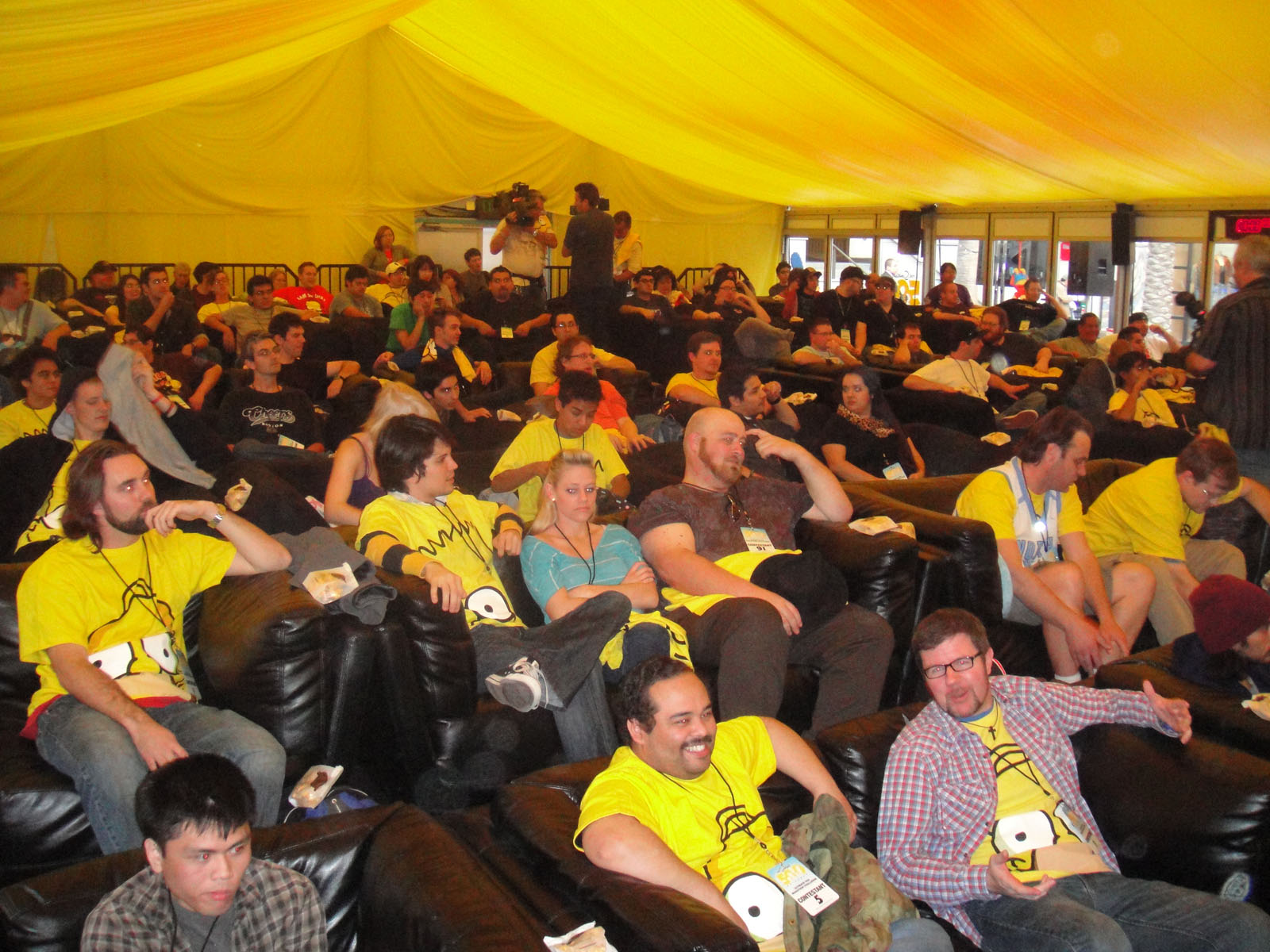
Fans of The Simpsons were invited to watch a marathon of the series' episodes at Hollywood & Highland.

To promote the 500th episode milestone, the Fox network, which airs The Simpsons, attempted to break the Guinness World Record for longest continuous television viewing by arranging a marathon screening of the show's episodes at Hollywood & Highland. The record of 86 hours, six minutes, and 41 seconds was set in 2010 when three people watched all episodes of the Fox show 24. One hundred fans were selected to participate in the Simpsons marathon, which was also a contest to determine which fan could last the longest into the marathon. The screening started on February 8, 2012, with "Simpsons Roasting on an Open Fire", the first episode of the series, and ended on February 12 of that same year with "Faith Off", the eleventh episode of the eleventh season. At that point, 86 hours and 37 minutes had passed, which meant the record was broken. The two remaining viewers—Jeremiah Franco and Carin Shreve—were crowned joint winners of the contest and each won US$10,500. They also got to attend the 500th Episode Celebration party held on February 13, 2012, for the cast and crew of The Simpsons.

== Reception ==
The episode was originally broadcast on the Fox network in the United States on February 19, 2012. It was watched by approximately 5.77 million people during this broadcast, and in the demographic for adults aged 18–49, it received a 2.6 Nielsen rating and a seven percent share. The rating was a thirty percent increase from the previous episode, "The Daughter Also Rises". "At Long Last Leave" became the most-watched broadcast in Fox's Animation Domination lineup for the night in terms of total viewers. It also became the second highest-rated broadcast among adults aged 18–49.

"At Long Last Leave" has received generally positive reviews from television critics, particularly for its couch gag in the Simpsons opening sequence. This couch gag features a frame-by-frame montage of previous couch gags that pulls back into a photomosaic of the number "500".

The A.V. Club critic Hayden Childs wrote that the "best thing about the 500th Simpsons episode is the opening couch montage, which hits the nostalgia bullseye almost perfectly."

HitFix's Alan Sepinwall praised the couch gag as being "marvelous", noting that it "actually made me choke up a bit." Sepinwall commended "At Long Last Leave", commenting that "like many latter-day Simpsons outings, [it] features a story we've seen variations on several times before (including in The Simpsons Movie), but also features many funny jokes that affirm my belief that I'm happier to live in a world that keeps giving us new Simpsons episodes ... than I will be in the one where that inevitably stops."

Tim Goodman of The Hollywood Reporter wrote: "I got a few laughs and that's all I ever look for in The Simpsons these days. I just like knowing it's still there. ... It doesn't have the spring in the legs quite like it used to. It's not going to dazzle at the same spectacular rate. But even after 500 episodes, it still has a little something left." Goodman described the couch gag as "lovely".

Matt Roush of TV Guide wrote favorably about "At Long Last Leave", describing it as a "keeper" and highlighting the "dazzling opening sequence". He concluded that The Simpsons "once again delivers the goods, proving itself to be a classic for our age and for the ages."

Childs was less positive, writing that the episode is "nothing special" as "all of the elements seem drawn from earlier stories" and "only a few of the jokes rise to the lowered bar of latter-day Simpsons humor." He added, however, that "nothing in the episode goes outrageously wrong, either. There is little Family Guy-style stupidity and randomness, the satire is gently pointed inward, and the guest star, while splashy for his controversiality, does not hijack the plot—instead appearing for a single joke before vanishing."

Time critic James Poniewozik commented that "At Long Last Leave" was an "all right" episode, noting that certain gags felt "forced by the writers' room". He added however that "a few moments made me bark out loud and realize why I loved the show in the first place."
