= Them, Robot =

- The Simpsons episode
- Episode no.: Season 23; Episode 17
- Directed by: Mike Frank Polcino
- Written by: Michael Price
- Production code: PABF10
- Original air date: March 18, 2012

Guest appearance
- Brent Spiner as the Robots

Episode features
- Couch gag: The Simpsons sit on the couch in 1989 with a banner above it that reads "America: Most Powerful Country in the World." 23 years pass and the banner now reads, "Too Big to Fail — We Hope!" with Maggie clutching a miniature Chinese flag.

Episode chronology
← Previous "How I Wet Your Mother"	Next → "Beware My Cheating Bart"
- The Simpsons season 23

"Them, Robot" is the seventeenth episode of the twenty-third season of the American animated television series The Simpsons. The episode was directed by Mike Frank Polcino and written by Michael Price. It originally aired on the Fox network in the United States on March 18, 2012.

In this episode, Mr. Burns replaces the power plant workers with robots except for Homer, who gives them personalities, resulting in disaster. Brent Spiner guest stars as the voice of the robots. The episode received mixed reviews.

The episode title refers to the 2004 film I, Robot.

== Plot ==
After Mr. Burns' lawyer tells him that drug tests for the plant workers are costing him money, Smithers proposes to replace the employees with robots in order to cut costs. Mr. Burns fires all of his employees, but Smithers insists that Burns retain one human worker to perform maintenance and to serve as a possible scapegoat. Homer becomes the lucky employee, after bursting into Burns' office to thank him for years of service and to criticize him for being cruel to his fellow man. With everyone else at the plant out of work (including Smithers), the town suffers from a 99% unemployment rate.

Homer tries to socialize with the robots, only to be electrically shocked by one who does not understand his "Working hard or hardly working?" joke. Homer steals Mr. Burns' robot manual to change the robot workers' personalities and give them human emotions, and to program them to play baseball with him and Bart. During the baseball game, one robot hits the ball out of bounds. Homer runs backwards into the street to catch it, not noticing that there is a truck approaching. A robot saves his life by walking in front of the truck, then several more robots walk onto the road in front of oncoming cars and trucks. At the robot funeral, Homer tries to propose a toast. But one robot states that the Three Laws of Robotics demands that robots must protect humans; because alcohol is bad for human health, the robot takes away Homer's beer. Annoyed by this, Homer borrows Flanders' drill and gives them "robot lobotomies," but this reprograms the robots to "eliminate all impediments to the plant" by killing Homer.

Homer runs to Mr. Burns' mansion for help, but Mr. Burns makes things worse by releasing his hounds on the robots. One robot easily flings one of the hounds a great distance. The other hounds retreat in fear. When Mr. Burns insults them, the slighted hounds become angry and join the robots. They chase Burns and Homer, who hide inside Mr. Burns' greenhouse. The robots burst in, but Homer and Mr. Burns are saved by the unemployed citizens of Springfield. Burns rehires his former employees as temps. Homer rebuilds one of the robots and takes it on a fishing trip, but the robot becomes annoyed by Homer and self-destructs.

== Production ==
Guest star Brent Spiner provides the voice of all the robots. Spiner knew episode writer Michael Price, and he offered the role to Spiner. He thought voice acting was easy and compared it to "stealing money." "Robot Parade" from No! by They Might Be Giants is played at the end.

== Reception ==
The episode originally aired on the Fox network in the United States on March 18, 2012. It was watched by approximately 5.24 million people during this broadcast, and in the demographic for adults aged 18–49, it received a 2.4 Nielsen rating and a seven percent share. "Them, Robot" became the second highest-rated broadcast in Fox's Animation Domination lineup for the night in terms of both total viewers and adults aged 18–49.

Hayden Childs of The A.V. Club gave the episode a B, saying that while "there are a number of good jokes in this installment, the satire is far too gentle, if not feeble, for its subject matter, and the episode is far too willing to bury the satire to further the plot," but that "the episode offers enough good-natured humor to keep itself afloat."

Teresa Lopez of TV Fanatic gave the episode 3.5 out of 5 stars. Lopez felt the plot relied heavily on Homer's stupidity. She highlighted the robots' lines during the baseball scene.

John Schwarz of Bubbleblabber gave the episode a 9 out of 10 and thought that the episode was a "sterling effort." He highlighted several sight gags and the joke that the baseball rules of American League are worse than those of the National League.

Steven Keslowitz referred to this episode as an example of popular culture warning of the dangers of automation.
