= The D'oh-cial Network =

- The Simpsons episode
- Episode no.: Season 23; Episode 11
- Directed by: Chris Clements
- Written by: J. Stewart Burns
- Production code: PABF04
- Original air date: January 15, 2012

Guest appearances
- Armie Hammer as the Winklevoss twins; David Letterman as himself

Episode features
- Chalkboard gag: "We do need no education"
- Couch gag: The Simpson family arrives in New York City to be guests on Late Show with David Letterman.

Episode chronology
← Previous "Politically Inept, with Homer Simpson"	Next → "Moe Goes from Rags to Riches"
- The Simpsons season 23

"The D'oh-cial Network" is the eleventh episode of the twenty-third season of the American animated television series The Simpsons. It originally aired on the Fox network in the United States on January 15, 2012. In the episode, Lisa is sad that she has no real friends. She discovers that it is easier to make friends on the Internet and therefore creates a social networking website called SpringFace. It becomes incredibly popular in Springfield and Lisa gets many online friends. However, they still ignore her in real life, and the website starts to cause trouble in the town when people use it while driving and cause accidents. Lisa is put on trial and the court orders her to close down SpringFace.

The episode is a satire of the social networking website Facebook and parodies the film The Social Network, which tells the story of how Facebook was founded. The Winklevoss twins, who sued Facebook founder Mark Zuckerberg for stealing their idea, are featured in the episode. Actor Armie Hammer portrayed the twins in both The Social Network and "The D'oh-cial Network". This episode also features a guest appearance by talk show host David Letterman as himself, appearing in the Simpsons opening sequence. Since airing, "The D'oh-cial Network" has received generally mixed response from television reviewers, with criticism directed at its satire. Around 11.48 million Americans tuned in to watch the episode during its original broadcast.

== Plot ==
The episode starts in a courtroom where Lisa is on trial. The Blue-Haired Lawyer is accusing her of bringing devastation upon Springfield because of her selfish desire to be accepted by others. Lisa starts telling everyone in the courtroom about her side of the story. A few months ago, she and her family went to the new mall in town. There, she encountered her schoolmates Sherri and Terri and asked them if she could spend some time with them at the mall. The two twins said no to Lisa, which made her realize that she has no real friends. Later, Lisa went on Homer's computer and discovered that it is easier to make friends online than in real life, and thus she started a social networking website called SpringFace to get friends. The site became instantly popular among all the citizens of Springfield and Lisa made over a thousand friends in a short period of time. However, Lisa soon noticed that these friends only talked to her on SpringFace and not in real life. She also discovered that the website grew too big to control, with people becoming so addicted to it that they even used it while driving their cars. This caused chaos in the town after numerous car crashes and deaths.

In the present time, the court orders Lisa to shut down SpringFace, and Lisa agrees to do this. The people of Springfield throw away their smartphones and computers soon after the website is closed. When Lisa looks outside her window, she sees Sherri and Terri and a bunch of their friends playing Marco Polo, and they invite Lisa to join them. Patty and Selma are then seen competing in a rowing race against the Winklevoss twins at the London 2012 Olympics, with Patty and Selma winning. This is followed by a short entitled "A Simpsons 'Show's Too Short' Story", animated in the dark, grim style of American artist Edward Gorey. It tells the story of how Bart was a troublemaker from the day he was born, and shows him and Milhouse wrapping Springfield Elementary School in toilet paper.

== Production ==
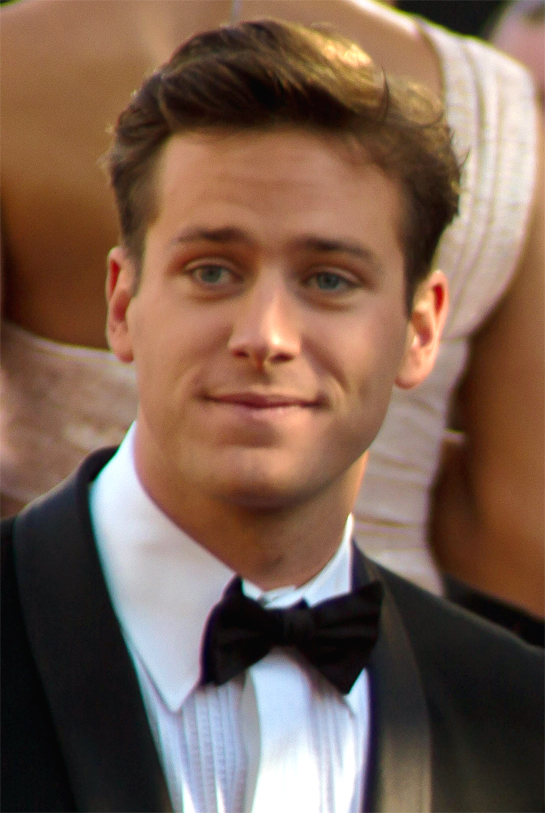
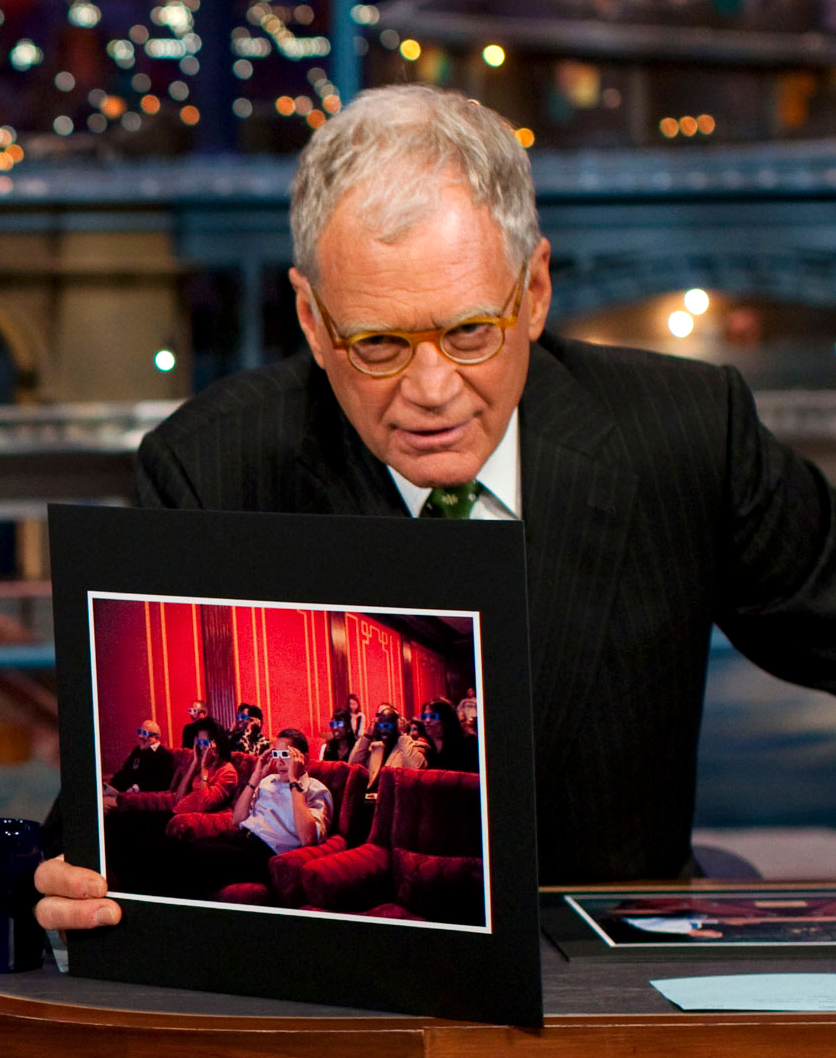
Armie Hammer (left) guest starred in the episode as the Winklevoss twins, a role he played in The Social Network. David Letterman (right) appeared as himself in the opening sequence.

"The D'oh-cial Network" was written by J. Stewart Burns and directed by Chris Clements as part of the twenty-third season of The Simpsons (2011–2012). It was the second episode written by Burns that season, the first being "Holidays of Future Passed". According to Hayden Childs of The A.V. Club, the episode satirizes the phenomenon of the social networking website Facebook. He commented that "the thrust of the satire can be summed up with the age-old cry of parents to their offspring to put that damn thing down and go outside already." Childs added that the episode points out "the most blatant of the many faults of Facebook—namely, its hypnotic ability to distract people in a semi-narcissistic haze [...]".

"The D'oh-cial Network" also parodies the 2010 drama film The Social Network, which portrays the founding of Facebook by Mark Zuckerberg and the subsequent lawsuit by American rowers Cameron Winklevoss and Tyler Winklevoss who claimed Zuckerberg stole their idea. The Social Network, like the episode, features a scene in which the Winklevoss twins are seen rowing; both scenes are soundtracked by different renditions of Edvard Grieg's "In the Hall of the Mountain King". In July 2011, it was announced in Entertainment Weekly that American actor Armie Hammer would make a guest appearance in "The D'oh-cial Network", playing the Winklevoss twins. Hammer previously attained that role in The Social Network. According to The Simpsons showrunner Al Jean, the staff of the show decided not to ask the Winklevoss twins to guest star in the episode as themselves because "We [the staff] were like, 'Wait, [Hammer] played them, that's who people think they are, we should just get him.'" Hammer met with the producers of the series in May 2011 to record his lines.

American talk show host David Letterman also guest starred in "The D'oh-cial Network", appearing as himself in the couch gag in the Simpsons opening sequence at the beginning of the episode. The couch gag sees the Simpson family arriving in New York City to the tune of "Rhapsody in Blue" to be guests on Late Show with David Letterman. The Simpsons music editor Chris Ledesma wrote on his blog that there was originally a discussion among the staff of the show about how the sequence would be scored. According to Ledesma, Jean "wanted something hustly-bustly that represented New York City. Thoughts immediately turned to the music of George Gershwin. Woody Allen had used 'Rhapsody in Blue' to great effect in Manhattan and probably connected forever in people’s minds the black & white images of New York with the melodies of that piece." Ledesma wrote that acquiring the license to use the musical piece was expensive, but Jean thought "it would be the perfect piece to use for the couch gag." The dark cabaret band Tiger Lillies performed their version of the Simpsons theme over the closing credits of the episode. The Simpsons creator Matt Groening, a fan of the band, was responsible for recruiting its members to the show.

== Release ==
The episode originally aired on the Fox network in the United States on January 15, 2012. It was watched by approximately 11.48 million people during this broadcast, and in the demographic for adults aged 18–49, the episode received a 5.4 Nielsen rating and a thirteen percent share. This was a large increase over the previous episode of the series, "Politically Inept, with Homer Simpson", which received a 2.3 rating. However, "The D'oh-cial Network" was preceded by a popular National Football League playoffs game that helped improve its rating. The episode became the highest-rated broadcast in Fox's Animation Domination lineup that night in terms of both total viewers and in the 18–49 demographic, finishing ahead of new episodes of Family Guy and Napoleon Dynamite. For the week of January 9–15, 2012, "The D'oh-cial Network" placed third in the ratings among all prime-time broadcasts in the 18–49 demographic, being beaten only by two football games. This meant The Simpsons was the top scripted show among adults aged 18–49 that week.

The reception of "The D'oh-cial Network" by television critics has been generally mixed. The Guardian reviewer Sam Wollaston called the episode "lovely", arguing that while "The Simpsons perhaps doesn't deliver as often as it once did," this episode proved "it still can, after all this time." The Evening Herald's Pat Stacey wrote that it has "been a while since The Simpsons delivered a gold medal-standard performance, yet at least there were satisfying flashes of silver [in this episode]." She added that she "liked the moment when Hans Moleman is hit by Homer's car and frantically hammers the 'Dislike' button as he sails through the air."

Hayden Childs of The A.V. Club thought the episode was less successful at satirizing Facebook compared to the episode "Holidays of Future Passed". He explained that there is "a moment in 'Holidays' when Lisa steps into the future version of the Internet and is immediately besieged by a mountain of friend requests. That was a small yet sharp parody of Facebook’s ubiquity, but ['The D'oh-cial Network'] lays into the same topic with a less deft touch." Childs added that the episode "has a few good jokes to keep the proceedings moving along, but not enough to rescue [it] from mediocrity." He concluded that he thought the story ended too fast with Lisa shutting down her website and the citizens of Springfield returning to their everyday technology-lacking life: "That’s a bit too quick a turn, [...] slapping a moralistic tone onto all of the preceding satire." David Crawford of Radio Times commented that "The D'oh-cial Network" features "a rather thin attempt to parody The Social Network". Yahoo! TV's Brian Davis criticized the episode for being too "straightforward in terms of the satire" as it was "generally obvious [...] what each reference and joke was referring to."
