= Treehouse of Horror XXII =

- The Simpsons episode
- Promotional image for the episode
- Episode no.: Season 23; Episode 3
- Directed by: Matthew Faughnan
- Written by: Carolyn Omine
- Production code: NABF19
- Original air date: October 30, 2011

Guest appearances
- Aron Ralston as the 911 Dispatcher; Jackie Mason as Rabbi Hyman Krustofsky

Episode chronology
| ← Previous "Bart Stops to Smell the Roosevelts" | Next → "Replaceable You" |
- The Simpsons season 23

"Treehouse of Horror XXII" is the third episode of the twenty-third season and the twenty-second Halloween episode of the American animated television series The Simpsons. It originally aired on the Fox network in the United States on October 30, 2011. The episode is part of the Treehouse of Horror series, which is an episode divided into three separate stories and an opening that is a parody of scary or Halloween themed stories. This episode's stories were primarily spoofs of the French film The Diving Bell and the Butterfly, the television series Dexter, and the American film Avatar. The opening was a parody of the autobiographical film 127 Hours, in which the subject Aron Ralston loses an arm.

The episode was written by Carolyn Omine, directed by Matthew Faughnan, and featured guest voices from Aron Ralston and Jackie Mason. In its original American broadcast, it was viewed by approximately 8.1 million people. The critical reception was very diverse, ranging from a plea to end the show to a statement that the show is on top of its game and should not be cancelled. The episode featured a reference to the Broadway musical Spider-Man: Turn Off the Dark. After watching the show, the producers of the musical released a press statement in which they told how flattered they were when their show was mentioned on The Simpsons.

== Plot ==
=== Opening ===
When Bart, Lisa and Maggie come home with their Halloween candy hauls, Marge confiscates all of it to donate to the army. Homer instead runs off with the bag to eat its contents in privacy at a canyon cliff, but slips and falls into a canyon. One arm is pinned under a boulder, leaving him unable to reach the candy. Rather than wait 20 minutes for rescue after calling 9-1-1, in a parody of 127 Hours, he decides to gnaw off his arm, but mistakenly gnaws off his unpinned arm and one leg first. After freeing himself and sticking his other arm back on, he discovers that the children have switched the candy for vegetables. He screams in rage as they gorge themselves at home, and Bart opens his mouth to show the episode title spelled in chewed-up candy.

=== The Diving Bell and the Butterball ===
In a parody of The Diving Bell and the Butterfly and Spider-Man, Homer begins to decorate the house for Halloween and is reaching for a decoration in a box. Unfortunately, there is a real black widow spider in the box and when Homer grabs what he thinks is a plastic spider, he is bitten by it. The bite leaves Homer paralyzed and unable to speak. When Lisa reads for him, she discovers that he can communicate through farting. The Simpson family is amazed at the result and Lisa helps Homer tell Marge how he feels about her. When he is again bitten by another spider (a radioactive one this time), he gains the ability to shoot spider webs out of his rear end and have the same abilities as Spider-Man, though he is still unable to move or talk.

=== Dial D for Diddily ===
In a parody of Dexter, after hearing a voice that he thinks is God telling him to murder people, Ned Flanders becomes a serial killing vigilante, targeting characters who are Homer's enemies. When Ned discovers that Homer is the one who has been duping him into committing murder (by way of a Bible-shaped receiver), Homer argues that God does not exist and starts burning Ned's bible, only to be stopped and strangled to death by God Himself. Marge begs God to reverse everything that has happened, but God tells her that Satan is the one who is running the world, and Satan demands a cup of coffee from God. When Ned thinks that this scenario cannot get any worse, it is revealed that Satan is sleeping with Ned's deceased wife, Maude.

=== In the Na'vi ===
In a parody of Avatar, taking place in the future, Krusty the Clown sends the military force to the planet Rigel 7 to find the sacred extract Hilarrium, so he can easily entertain his Nazi audience. The military recruits Bart and Milhouse to befriend the alien race in avatar bodies. They succeed in this and Bart ends up getting Kang's daughter pregnant after falling in love with her. They go to the queen, whose extract used to reduce the mood swings of pregnant women is the Hilarrium they're looking for. Milhouse then contacts the military of their location, which then attacks the natives. In the battle, the natives are helped by all the animals of the planet, which eventually defeats the military. Kang and Kodos then admit that they would have just given the Hilarrium to the humans if they just asked.

=== Ending ===
At the end, Carol of the Bells is played as all of the characters that appeared say various things about Christmas, such as Marge saying that making a sweater causes 27 people to lose their jobs. At the very end, Grampa shows up in a black tutu, asking when the Black Swan comes up, leaving everyone unsure what to tell him.

== Production ==
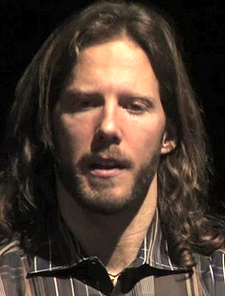
Aron Ralston guest starred in the opening segment, which was a parody of his biographical film 127 Hours.

"Treehouse of Horror XXII" was written by Carolyn Omine and directed by Matthew Faughnan. The episode is part of the Treehouse of Horror series, which since the second season, has been a tradition for The Simpsons to air a new Halloween special each year. Treehouse of Horror episodes typically consist of four parts: an opening and Halloween-themed version of the credits, followed by three segments. These segments usually have a horror, science fiction or fantasy theme and quite often are parodies of films, novels, plays, television shows, Twilight Zone episodes, or old issues of EC Comics. The episode featured guest appearances from Jackie Mason and Aron Ralston, who was the subject of the film 127 Hours. Mason has a recurring role on The Simpsons as Rabbi Hyman Krustofski, who is the father of Krusty the Clown. As it is tradition with most Treehouse of Horror episodes, this episode featured the use of "scary" names in the credits, which is to write alternate names for cast and crew in a "scary" fashion. Ralston came up with his own scary name for the credits, which was Aron "I gave my right arm to be on 'The Simpsons'" Ralstump.

The episode marks the first time of all the Treehouse of Horror episodes that an actual theremin was used for music cues. Previously, the show had trouble locating a theremin player, who could work under the time constraints of the show. Instead, the show used a synthesizer keyboard to play a theremin sample - much to creator Matt Groening's displeasure. The situation turned when a scene in "Homer Scissorhands" was written to feature Milhouse playing the theremin. Now the crew had to find a suitable theremin player and Charles Richard Lester was hired for that episode as well as "Treehouse of Horror XXII".

The opening segment had many parodies and references to films. When the segment opens, the Simpson family is dressed up for Halloween. Here Maggie pops out of Bart's astronaut suit, dressed as a baby alien, which is a reference to the 1979 film Alien. Homer is dressed as Doctor Manhattan from the 2009 superhero film Watchmen. During the middle, there is a spoof of the 1960 film Psycho, as the same music and similar scenes are used (E.G: Reverend Lovejoy eyeing Homer in his car. In the end of the segment, it turns into a spoof of the 2010 film 127 Hours, in which Ralston loses his arm after being trapped under a rock. Ralston voiced the 911 dispatcher Homer calls when he is trapped.

"The Diving Bell and the Butterball" was a satire of the 2007 French film The Diving Bell and the Butterfly, in which a paralyzed man learns to communicate through moving his eyelids. Instead of moving his eyelids, Homer communicated through flatulence. The segment took off in different direction when Homer was bitten by another spider and turned into a paralyzed Spider-Man with reversed colors, swinging around Springfield and fighting crime. The last part references the Spider-Man musical, Spider-Man: Turn Off the Dark that was plagued by stage malfunctions and sometimes left its performers to dangle in mid-air. The many accidents caused five people to become injured while working on the musical.

The last two segments were also parodies of popular culture. "Dial D for Diddily" featured various references to the television series, Dexter, the titular character whom Ned Flanders is supposed to represent when he goes on a killing spree. The music in the segment is the original music from the main title theme of Dexter by Rolfe Kent, although the title references Dial M for Murder. Two of the targets, Patty and Selma Bouvier, were killed in a similar fashion to the style of Wile E. Coyote. "In the Na'vi" was a parody of the 2009 film Avatar. In the end, Kang and Kodos mentions that "there is no word for ‘yours’ or ‘mine.’", which is why they do not enjoy the 1968 film Yours, Mine and Ours (or the 2005 remake).

== Release ==
=== Broadcast ===
"Treehouse of Horror XXII" originally aired on the Fox network in the United States on October 30, 2011, the night before Halloween. The release date was unusual for a Treehouse of Horror episode, because ever since Fox got the rights to the Major League Baseball playoffs, most of the Halloween specials aired in the first week of November. This only marks the second time Fox has aired a Treehouse of Horror episode in October since 1999 – in 2009 it aired nearly two weeks before Halloween. Major League Baseball decided to move the 2011 World Series earlier than the previous season so that no games would be played in November, leaving October 30 free for Fox to air "Treehouse of Horror XXII" on that date. When The Wrap asked show runner Al Jean if he was satisfied with the airing the night before Halloween, Jean said: "Yes, and the perfect thing is, Halloween is actually a bad day to air it, because nobody watches TV that night. Especially if they have kids. So October 30th, it is our Halloween. People can watch it and then still go out the next night." Since then, every Treehouse of Horror episode following "Treehouse of Horror XXII" has aired during the month of October.

The episode was watched by approximately 8.10 million people during the first broadcast. The show received a 4.0 Nielsen rating in the demographic for adults aged 18–49 and a ten percent share of the audience, which was a 33 percent increase from the previous episode "Bart Stops to Smell the Roosevelts". The Simpsons became the highest-rated program in Fox's Animation Domination lineup that night both in terms of viewers and in the 18–49 demographic. It finished before Family Guy, The Cleveland Show and the series premiere of Allen Gregory. Besides a broadcast of an NFL Football game between the Dallas Cowboys and the Philadelphia Eagles on NBC, The Simpsons was the most watched program of the night in the 18–49 demographic. In comparison, the episode increased eight percent over the previous year's "Treehouse of Horror XXI", which had a 3.7 Nielsen rating and a nine percent share of the audience in the 18–49 demographic. For the week of October 24–30, 2011, The Simpsons finished 14th in the 18–49 demographic, fourth in the 18–34 demographic, and third among teenagers.

=== Critical reception ===
Since airing, "Treehouse of Horror XXII" has received mixed to negative reviews from critics, who widely consider it among the worst "Treehouse of Horror" episodes to date. Josh Harrison of Ology was positive and gave the episode a rating of seven out of ten, but commented that he preferred "episodes that feature longer, more involved storylines more than the spoof collections." At The A.V. Club, Hayden Childs gave the episode a C+ grade, saying, "The writers seem unwilling to mock the more outrageous aspects of the movies they are sending up and settle for weakly batting at the obvious. Some of the jokes land, but none land too solidly." Meredith Woerner of io9 thought that "[t]he whole thing never quite achieved the same level of brilliance as some previous years — even though the Avatar bit was funny, we've seen so many Avatar spoofs by now that, well, it's tired. However we did get a lot of joy out of seeing Homer dressed up as Doctor Manhattan and Maggie as a wee-little chest burster." Even more critical was CraveOnline's Blair Marnell who gave the episode a rating of three out of ten. He commented that "there is no stronger argument for ending 'The Simpsons' than the latest Halloween installment of 'Treehouse of Horror'" and further said that "in all honesty, it's amazing how tame 'The Simpsons' has become over the years. This show used to be the 'South Park' of its day. Now it's just showing its age and it's no longer the cool TV rebel that it used to be." Alex Strachan had the opposite reaction in a review in Calgary Herald and concluded that we should "[f]orget all that talk about The Simpsons being past its prime. Based on tonight's sharp-eyed, keen-witted Treehouse of Horror XXII - funnier, faster and more fright-worthy than last year's dud, thankfully - there's a lot of ink left in the old ink pot yet."

The first segment, "The Diving Bell and the Butterball", was met with mixed reactions. Marnell called the parody "wildly unfunny", while Childs was critical of Homer turning into a paralyzed Spider-Man and stated that it was "simply not very funny." Tim Surette of TV.com was more ambivalent and said: "I found this sketch to be simultaneously awesome and terrible because I have the maturity of a 6-year old and the intelligence of an average man." The reference to the Broadway musical Spider-Man: Turn Off the Dark was noticed by the producers of the musical. They reacted by issuing a statement the following day: "Everyone at 'Spider-Man: Turn Off the Dark' was extremely flattered by last night’s tribute on 'The Simpsons.' 'The Simpsons' is an iconic American institution, and being part of last night's episode was an honor and dream come true." Coincidentally, the previous aired episode of South Park, "Broadway Bro Down", also had a reference to the musical, but the spokesperson for the Broadway show did not want to comment on that episode. Vulture ranked it the worst "Treehouse of Horror" segment ever, stating, "From stale parodies to uncalled-for fart jokes (Homer can only communicate through flatulence; he also shoots spider webs out of his butt), 'Diving Bell' is the worst Treehouse yet."

The response for "Dial D for Diddly" was that it started well, but then gradually declined. In Marnell's opinion, "[t]he best segment of the entire episode comes when Ned makes his normal routine look sinister and yet when he finally closes his hands to pray, he's actually holding a pair of severed hands", but as for the rest of the segment, he is disappointed: "[W]hen it seems like the short is heading for some darkly hilarious territory, the voice of God turns out to be Homer urging Ned to murder his enemies." Other reviewers agreed with his assessment. Surette concluded that the episode "[s]tarted off good, but got boring very quick." Likewise, Childs commented that the "segment had a lot of promise for the funny, but it started to sag fast and then sank altogether."

Much of the criticism towards the Avatar spoof "In the Na'Vi" goes towards the timing of the episode. Surette thought that it was "[a]n Avatar spoof that came about two years too late. This sketch had no redeeming qualities and should be erased from the minds of all Simpsons fans immediately." Similarly, Marnell commented that in the episode "The Simpsons' finally gets around to parodying 'Avatar' — a movie picked to death by 'South Park' and other series a year or two ago" and further elaborated that "[i]t's almost a straight forward retelling of 'Avatar' without the biting satire that made the film parodies of previous years so much fun." In general, Treehouse of Horror episodes take about a year to complete for the staff. This is because they have to do many original designs, such as characters and backgrounds. Prior to the airing of the episode, Jean revealed that the staff was already working on "Treehouse of Horror XXIII".

At the 39th Annual Annie Awards, Omine won the "Writing in a Television Production" category for her work on "Treehouse of Horror XXII".
