= How I Wet Your Mother =

- The Simpsons episode
- Episode no.: Season 23; Episode 16
- Directed by: Lance Kramer
- Written by: Billy Kimball; Ian Maxtone-Graham
- Production code: PABF08
- Original air date: March 11, 2012

Guest appearances
- David Byrne as "Dream Operator" singer; Glenn Close as Mona Simpson

Episode features
- Couch gag: The family lies down on a sushi mat, and a giant hand stuffs them into a sushi roll and chops it up. Maggie emerges intact.

Episode chronology
← Previous "Exit Through the Kwik-E-Mart"	Next → "Them, Robot"
- The Simpsons season 23

"How I Wet Your Mother" is the sixteenth episode of the twenty-third season of the American animated television series The Simpsons. It originally aired on the Fox network in the United States on March 11, 2012. In the episode, a traumatic incident causes Homer to repeatedly wet the bed. As it worsens, his family, with the help of Professor Frink, successfully manage to infiltrate his dreams to get to its subconscious source. The episode name is a pun on How I Met Your Mother.

The episode was co-written by Billy Kimball and Ian Maxtone-Graham and has received positive reviews from critics.

== Plot ==
At the power plant, Smithers accidentally leaves the door to the supply closet open. Homer invites everyone to steal supplies. However, Homer sees Mr. Burns approaching and hurries away, leaving his coworkers with the blame. Homer, thought to be the only one who did not steal anything, gets a day off, which he spends fishing with Bart. That night, Homer wets the bed while asleep.

Thinking karma is the reason, Homer apologizes to his coworkers with a free barbecue. Wetting the bed again, he buys a bedwetting alarm that will warn him when he is about to urinate. It wakes the family, and he explains his predicament. Marge encounters Professor Frink, who has invented a machine to enter people's dreams. They plug in Homer while he is asleep. The family enters his dream in which he is skiing. They see Death dragging a coffin. They fall off a cliff pursuing Death, and Frink warns that dying in the dream could kill them in real life.

To prolong their time, they use the machine to enter Bart's dream where they are in their style from The Tracey Ullman Show. Therapist B. F. Sherwood tells them to open the coffin, which starts filling the room with fish, so they enter Lisa's dream. Finding themselves on an Elizabethan stage, they return to Homer's dream, which is a city made of his desires. The police enter the Simpsons' home to get the machine, ignoring Frink's warnings that this could kill the Simpsons. As they fight, the machine falls to the floor, causing a large bottle of Duff Beer to fall in the dream and flood the city.

The Simpsons are rescued by Death, who is actually Mona. She shows them a childhood memory of Homer's. He and Grampa went on a fishing trip but returned home without any fish. Several weeks later, Mona left, which left Homer thinking the failed fishing trip caused his mother to leave. Homer then believes that when he took Bart fishing at the start of the episode, it all came back and the guilt might have triggered his bedwetting problem. Mona reassures him with another memory of her being relieved that Homer was safe with Grampa, which comforts Homer. Knowing the reason behind Homer's bed-wetting, they awaken as Chief Wiggum detaches the device. Homer is relieved he has not wet himself. Later, Homer spins a top. Marge says if it keeps spinning, they are still in a dream. It does, so they go for a naked bike ride. After they leave, the top falls on its side. Suddenly, it starts to hail, then Homer is hit by a truck, ending the episode.

== Production ==
The plot spoofs the 2010 film Inception. Glenn Close reprised her role of Mona Simpson (first appearing in that role in "Mother Simpson" 17 years prior). Close and musician David Byrne sing Talking Heads' song "Dream Operator" over the end credits. Byrne previously appeared in the fourteenth season episode "Dude, Where's My Ranch?"

== Reception ==
=== Viewing figures ===
The episode earned a 2.3 rating with a 7 share and was watched by 4.97 million viewers in the United States. It was the second most watched program on Fox that night.

=== Critical response ===
Hayden Childs, of The A.V. Club, was positive on the episode saying, "although it never reaches outright hilarity, 'How I Wet Your Mother' is one of the more interesting episodes of this season." He further noted that only having one major plot was a good idea and several good jokes in the episode. He rated the episode a B+.

Alison Willmore of IndieWire thought the episode made good use of the Inception parody by making Homer's mother appear in the limbo world. She also highlighted the appearance of the Simpson family in the style from The Tracey Ullman Show.

Teresa Lopez of TV Fanatic gave the episode 3.5 out of 5 stars. She thought the exploration of Homer's mind was funny but felt South Park's parody of Inception was better done.

=== Awards and nominations ===
Writers Billy Kimball and Ian Maxtone-Graham were nominated for the Annie Award for Outstanding Achievement for Writing in an Animated Television/Broadcast Production at the 40th Annie Awards for this episode.
