= Moe Goes from Rags to Riches =

- The Simpsons episode
- The rag tells its story.
- Episode no.: Season 23; Episode 12
- Directed by: Bob Anderson
- Written by: Tim Long
- Production code: PABF05
- Original air date: January 29, 2012

Guest appearance
- Jeremy Irons as the bar rag

Episode features
- Chalkboard gag: "There's no proven link between raisins and boogers"
- Couch gag: Repeat of the couch gag from "How the Test Was Won" and "Coming to Homerica," but Lisa isn't heard after getting hit by the football.

Episode chronology
← Previous "The D'oh-cial Network"	Next → "The Daughter Also Rises"
- The Simpsons season 23

"Moe Goes from Rags to Riches" is the twelfth episode of the twenty-third season of the American animated television series The Simpsons. The episode was directed by Bob Anderson and written by Tim Long. It originally aired on the Fox network in the United States on January 29, 2012.

In the episode, Moe Szyslak's old bar rag tells its history, from being a medieval French tapestry to ending up at Moe's bar. Meanwhile, Bart and Milhouse have an argument which prompts Milhouse to leave Bart. Jeremy Irons guest starred in the episode as the voice of Moe's bar rag. The episode received negative reviews, but it was nominated for an Emmy Award and an Annie Award.

== Plot ==
At a town meeting at Moe's Tavern (Springfield's town hall was being fumigated for a bed bug infestation), people say that Moe's best friend is his old bar rag. Bart continues with the joke by comparing the rag with Milhouse. Insulted, Milhouse spurns Bart's friendship. The rag tells its life story, from being a medieval French tapestry, woven by Marge after Mr. Burns, Duke of Springfield, killed all their sheep which released demon spirits that forced Marge to weave the encounters the tapestry would have. The Duke was later accidentally hanged by the tapestry when he fell off a mountain; going to a cathedral before Vikings attacked it and Homer tore it; and then to the king of Persia (Nelson). Nelson was then told 1001 stories by Scheherazade (Lisa), who releases his other wives who were thrown in a pit for being boring and decapitates him. The rag was also used as a blindfold for the executed and as a cloth on the chopping block in France; was used as a paint rag by Michelangelo in his creation of the Sistine Chapel; was used for a Confederate flag during the Civil War; and was made into soup during the Great Depression. It then went close to the top of Mount Everest as a flag, though the explorer died from lack of oxygen. Moe's father, the yeti on Everest found the rag and gave it as a gift to his son, an infant Moe.

Meanwhile, Bart tries to win Milhouse back as a friend, going to his house at night. Milhouse refuses at first, stating that he is doing well without Bart. Bart reads a poem about friendship to Milhouse, but Milhouse figures out that Lisa wrote it, and tells Bart that he can only win him back by doing something from the heart. As a gesture, Bart agrees to let Drederick Tatum punch him. Milhouse is deeply moved, and renews their friendship.

Moe wakes up to find the rag has been stolen. The thief is revealed as Marge, who cleans the rag before returning it. Moe then realizes that he has real friends in the Simpson family, and tosses the rag out the window for Santa's Little Helper, who takes care of the rag and then fights over it with Maggie. The rag, meanwhile, is overjoyed to have finally found an owner who truly loves it.

== Production ==
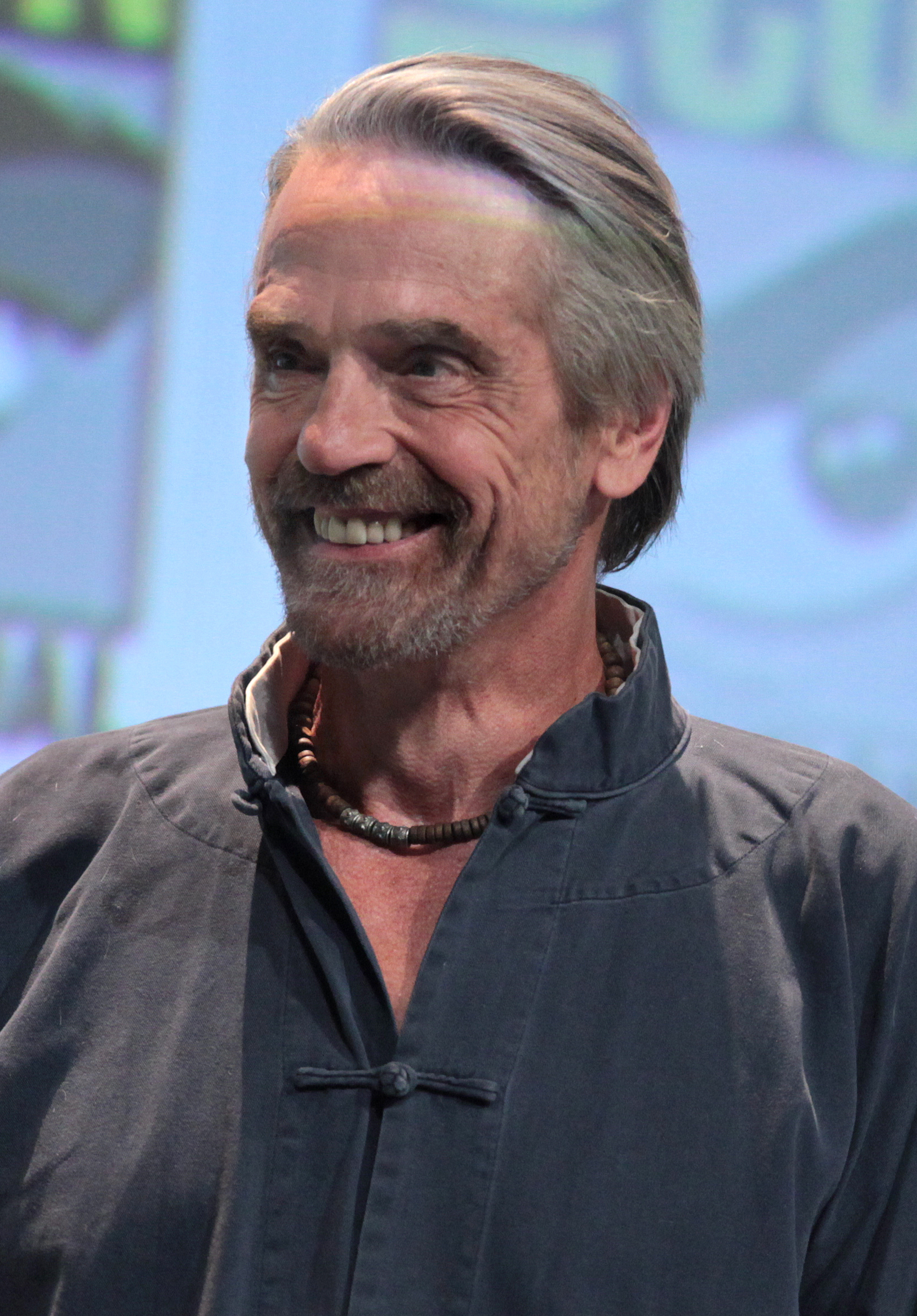
Guest star Jeremy Irons provided the voice of the rag.

The episode was written by Tim Long. It was first announced to the press at San Diego Comic-Con on July 23, 2011, during a panel with the producers of The Simpsons. The plot is similar to the film The Red Violin, which tells the story of a mysterious violin and its many owners over a period of several hundred years. English actor Jeremy Irons guest starred in the episode as the voice of the rag. He received the offer over a telephone call, and later told the press that "I was delighted to do it and I was honored to be asked." In an interview with The Daily Telegraph, Irons commented that when he first received the script, "it said, 'The Bar Rag speaks in a very sonorous voice.' And then it said in brackets, 'Think Jeremy Irons.'" He recorded his lines during the summer of 2011.

== Reception ==
=== Viewing figures ===
The episode originally aired on the Fox network in the United States on January 29, 2012. When airing the episode was watched by 5.1 million viewers, making it the second highest viewed program in the Animation Domination line up.

=== Critical response ===
"Moe Goes from Rags to Riches" received a negative review from Hayden Childs of The A.V. Club. Childs criticized the episode for its lack of satire, and wrote that "some of the funniest and best episodes [of season twenty-three] have tended to be also the most outlandish, but 'Moe Goes From Rags To Riches' is a major exception, with very few good jokes coming out of the wildest premise of the season to date." He concluded that "All in all, this was a rather baffling and disappointing experience that wastes a promising idea."

Teresa Lopez of TV Fanatic gave the episode 3 out of 5 stars. She thought that the use of the rag was pointless and that the subplot with Bart and Milhouse was filling time between scenes of the main plot.

Several websites named this episode as one of the worst episodes of The Simpsons.

=== Awards and nominations ===
At the 64th Primetime Creative Arts Emmy Awards in 2012, Hank Azaria was nominated for the Primetime Emmy Award for Outstanding Voice-Over Performance for his performance as Moe, Chief Wiggum, Carl, Comic Book Guy, Duffman and Mexican Duffman in this episode.

Animators Lynna Blankenship, Sean Coons, Hugh Macdonald, Debbie Peterson, Charles Ragins, Lance Wilder, Darrel Bowen, John Krause, Kevin Moore, Brent M. Bowen, Brice Mallier, Steven Fahey, Dima Malanitchev, Karen Bauer, Eli Balser, and Anne Legge were nominated for the Annie Award for Outstanding Achievement for Production Design in an Animated Television/Broadcast Production at the 40th Annie Awards for this episode.
