= Ned 'n' Edna's Blend Agenda =

- The Simpsons episode
- Episode no.: Season 23; Episode 21
- Directed by: Chuck Sheetz
- Written by: Jeff Westbrook
- Production code: PABF15
- Original air date: May 13, 2012

Guest appearance
- Marcia Wallace as Edna Krabappel

Episode features
- Chalkboard gag: "Call your mother during the commercials"
- Couch gag: In an homage to James Cameron's Avatar, the Simpsons are transferred into Na'vi bodies. Na'vi Bart tames a wild flying couch before the family sits down in front of the TV wearing blue/red 3D glasses.
- Commentary: Mike B. Anderson; Al Jean; Ian Maxtone-Graham; Carolyn Omine; David Silverman; Matt Selman; Tom Gammill; Chuck Sheetz

Episode chronology
← Previous "The Spy Who Learned Me"	Next → "Lisa Goes Gaga"
- The Simpsons season 23

"Ned 'n' Edna's Blend Agenda" is the twenty-first and penultimate episode of the twenty-third season of the American animated television series The Simpsons. The episode was directed by Chuck Sheetz and written by Jeff Westbrook. It originally aired on the Fox network in the United States on May 13, 2012.

In the episode, Ned reveals that he and Edna are married, but they begin to argue when Ned disapproves of Edna changing Rod and Todd's fashion. The episode received mixed reviews. Writer Jeff Westbrook won a Writers Guild of America Award for this episode.

== Plot ==
Chazz Busby (the ballet teacher from "Smoke on the Daughter") starts auditioning actors for a production of a passion play. Ned auditions to reprise his role as Jesus for the fifth year running, but is rejected when Chazz does not see enough potential in him. Homer overhears Chazz speaking to Ned and asks to take the role of Jesus, which he gets. After a caution from Lisa during rehearsals, Homer stuns the audience with his performance, until the cross Homer is tied to snaps and falls on Ned. Before the ambulance drives off, Edna Krabappel wishes to get into the ambulance with Ned, but is told that only family members are allowed: Ned reveals that she is his wife, the couple having secretly gotten married.

As the news about Ned and Edna's marriage spreads around town, Marge offers to have a party for their marriage and they both agree. Bart, noticing Edna's struggle to bond with Rod and Todd when alone with them, urges her to introduce them to the "real world" or life will be extremely difficult for them. While Ned is at a left-handers' support meeting, Edna goes to one of Rod and Todd's parent-teacher meetings at their Christian school. Disgusted by the lack of proper education in their school, Edna transfers them to Springfield Elementary, much to Ned's chagrin. That night, Ned has a dream that Rod and Todd do not live up to his expectations. On the day of the party, Edna and Ned argue about Rod and Todd's fashion (light-up trainers and temporary tattoos) and new vocabulary (Rod says "Chillax, Daddy"). Annoyed at Ned's inability to trust her, Edna leaves with the kids while Ned stays with the Simpsons for the night. The next morning, Ned sees Homer and Marge get into a fight and realizes that there will always be things that he and Edna will disagree on, so he rushes to the school and makes up with Edna. At the end, Homer, dressed up in Jesus costume, opens up Sleazy Sam's (which in the opening credits was the billboard advertisement) loan rental bank and claims to be the real Jesus until God shocks him with a lightning bolt.

== Production ==
For the press release for the episode, the episode was titled "Ned 'n' Edna's Blend." Subsequent releases for the episode retitled the episode "Ned 'n' Edna's Blend Agenda."

== Cultural references ==
Ned's nightmare is in the style of a Davey and Goliath claymation.

In July 2023, it was reported that this episode may have predicted that Elon Musk would rename Twitter to X because a screenshot showed Homer's smartphone having an app with an X logo. However, it was argued that the app may have been a parody of the Safari logo.

== Release ==
=== Ratings ===
The episode originally aired on the Fox network in the United States on May 13, 2012. It was watched by approximately 4 million people during this broadcast. It received a 1.9 Nielsen rating in the demographic for adults aged 18–49. The Simpsons was the third highest-rated program in the 18–49 demographic in Fox's Animation Domination lineup that night.

=== Critical reception ===
At The A.V. Club, Rowan Kaiser gave the episode a B+ rating. Kaiser wrote, "In retrospect, it’s easy to say that The Simpsons marketed the “‘Nedna’ relationship in an unfortunate fashion. By creating the relationship name immediately, and turning it into a finale/voting gimmick, the show made it look like a desperate cry for relevance (Marge tacitly admits as much, when she snaps ‘No voting!’ at Homer). But as tonight’s episode demonstrated, had the Ned/Edna relationship been allowed to develop more organically, away from the extra-textual bells and whistles, it could have been, and could still be, something that doesn’t immediately induce cringing."

Teresa Lopez of TV Fanatic gave the episode 3.5 out of 5 stars. She felt Ned and Edna's marriage was unbelievable and would have preferred seeing them dating and seeing them combine their lifestyles.

=== Awards and nominations ===
Writer Jeff Westbrook won the Writers Guild of America Award for Television: Animation at the 65th Writers Guild of America Awards for this episode.
