= Ron English =

American artist (born 1959)

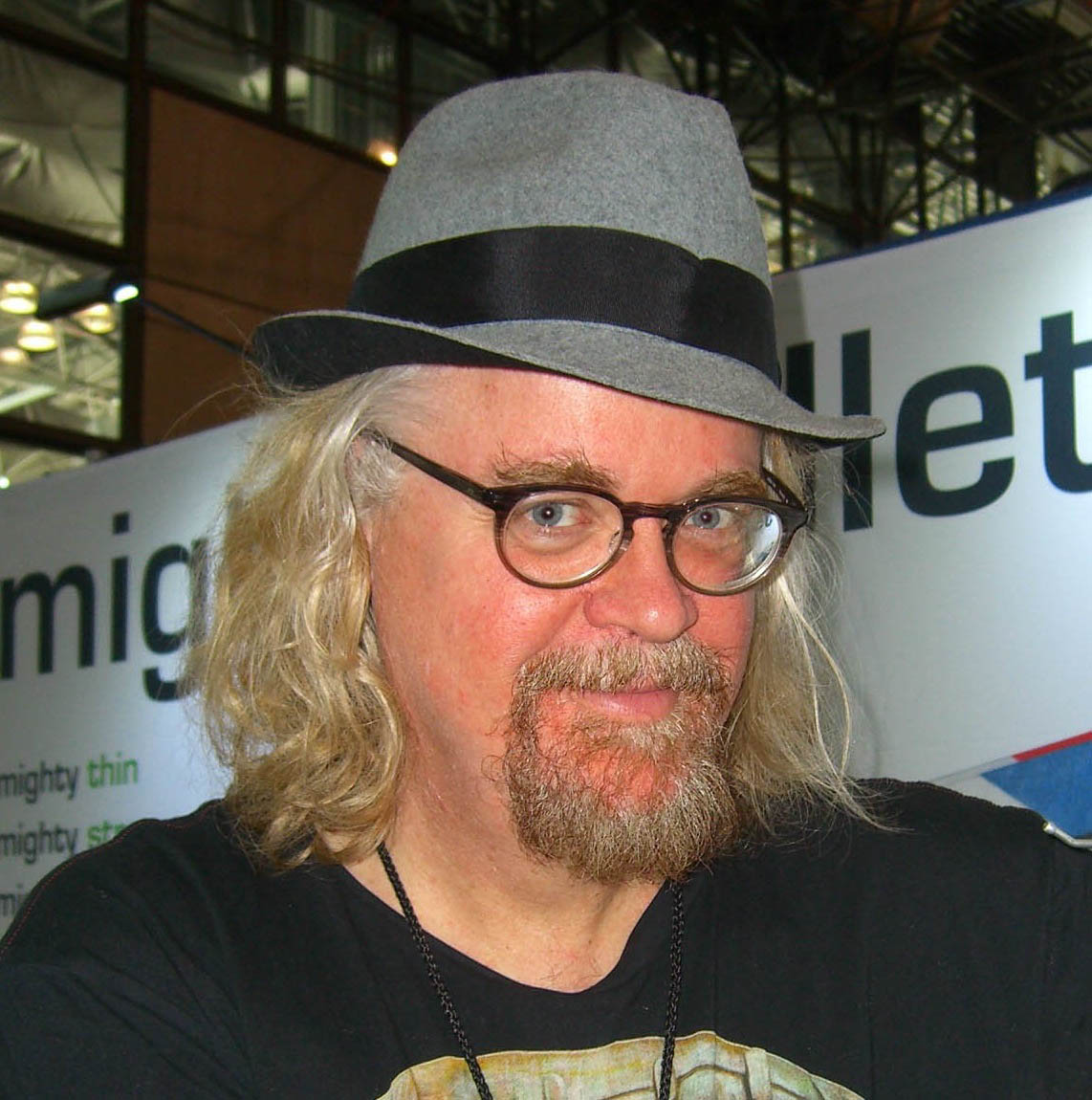
- English at the 2012 New York Comic Con
- Born: Ronald English; 1959 (age 66–67); Decatur, Illinois, U.S.
- Occupations: Pop artist, illustrator
- Website: www.popaganda.com

Ron English (born 1959 in Decatur, Illinois) is an American artist who explores brand imagery, street art, and advertising. He creates two and three dimensional works and multimedia projects. He coined the term "POPaganda" to describe his "blending of high and low cultural touchstones".

Beginning in the early 1980s, he has produced murals and has exhibited his work in galleries and museums.He has been featured in the documentary POPaganda: The Art and Crimes of Ron English and he created the fictional world of Living in Delusionville He has also designed sneakers, face masks, NFTs, and artist-designed fundraising campaigns.

== Early life and education ==
English was born in Decatur, Illinois. He attended the University of North Texas in Denton where he received a Bachelor of Fine Arts, and went on to attend the University of Texas where he received a MFA degree. He then moved to New York City, where he worked for several artists as an assistant.

== Career ==
Beginning in the early 1980s, English produced street interventions and other guerrilla works as a form of "culture jamming" on advertising billboards before developing a parallel studio practice. He has produced wall paintings, including murals on the Berlin Wall’s Checkpoint Charlie and on the West Bank separation barrier. He has targeted tobacco, fast-food and other consumer brands, reworking mascots such as Joe Camel and Ronald McDonald in order to satirize advertising and consumer capitalism. For example, his character MC Supersized, an overweight fast-food mascot that was included in the documentary Super Size Me (2004). The MC Supersized figure is based on what Ronald McDonald would look like if he ate his own product as a satirical take on American ideals of consumption and celebrity.

English developed a fictional universe he calls "Delusionville", an upside-down subterranean world populated by anthropomorphic animals and other recurring characters, including figures such as Elefanka, Mousezilla and members of his band The Rabbbits. Its inhabitants and settings appear across English's creative work. A documentary, Living in Delusionville, chronicles English's life and career, combining archival footage, animation and interviews, framing his story within the imaginary world that gives the film its title.

English leads The Rabbbits, a rock-oriented group he created as a musical extension of the Delusionville universe, with songs that tell stories from that fictional underworld. The band’s albums and performances draw on characters and themes from his visual work, with songs that reference the politics, mythologies and narratives of Delusionville. The Rabbbits have released recordings and performed live, extending Delusionville imagery into music and performance. English has also worked on collaborative music projects, including the band Hyperjinx Tricycle with musician Daniel Johnston and Jack Medicine, a recording project released on independent label Important Records.

English has also designed album-cover artwork for bands and recording artists including the Dandy Warhols' 2003 album Welcome to the Monkey House, featuring a banana half-exposed by a zipper in reference to Andy Warhol's record covers. He produced cover art for Slash's 2010 solo album Slash, as well as for Chris Brown's album F.A.M.E..

His work has been featured in documentaries including Morgan Spurlock's Super Size Me (2004), the street-art film Exit Through the Gift Shop (2010), and Spurlock's POM Wonderful Presents: The Greatest Movie Ever Sold (2011). He is the subject of Pedro Carvajal's documentary POPaganda: The Art and Crimes of Ron English, which traces his billboard interventions and studio work. And in 2022, English has been the subject of another documentary, Living in Delusionville, which expands on his life. English has appeared as himself in The Simpsons episode "Exit Through the Kwik-E-Mart" (2012) and has served as a guest judge on the Oxygen reality competition series Street Art Throwdown.

In the 2010s and 2020s, English began creating large-scale immersive installations and digital-collectibles projects. In 2021, he presented Sugar Circus, a large-scale indoor installation at The Nest in Shenzhen, described by Shenzhen Daily as a nearly 10,000-square-foot immersive art experience incorporating original paintings, large-format sculptures and art toys. He also collaborated with Spanish event brand elrow on Delusionville, a club and festival theme created by English that adapts his POPaganda universe into an immersive party environment with metamorphic landscapes and anthropomorphic animal characters presented at elrow events internationally. On the digital side, English entered the NFT space in 2021 with the Ron English Essential NFT Collection on Nifty Gateway and has continued to release Delusionville- and Cereal Killers-themed drops, while also collaborating with the digital-collectibles platform VeVe on a sequence of POPaganda-based releases; by the mid-2020s he was participating in VeVe’s “phygital” convention programmes at events such as DesignerCon, where physical sculptures and merchandise by artists including English are sold with redemption cards for paired digital collectibles.

The first art toy he produced was Ronnie Rabbit (also styled "Ronnnie Rabbbit"), produced by Dark Horse. Subsequent projects include a limited-edition fiberglass bust based on his cover art for Slash's 2010 solo album.

== Murals, street art and public interventions ==
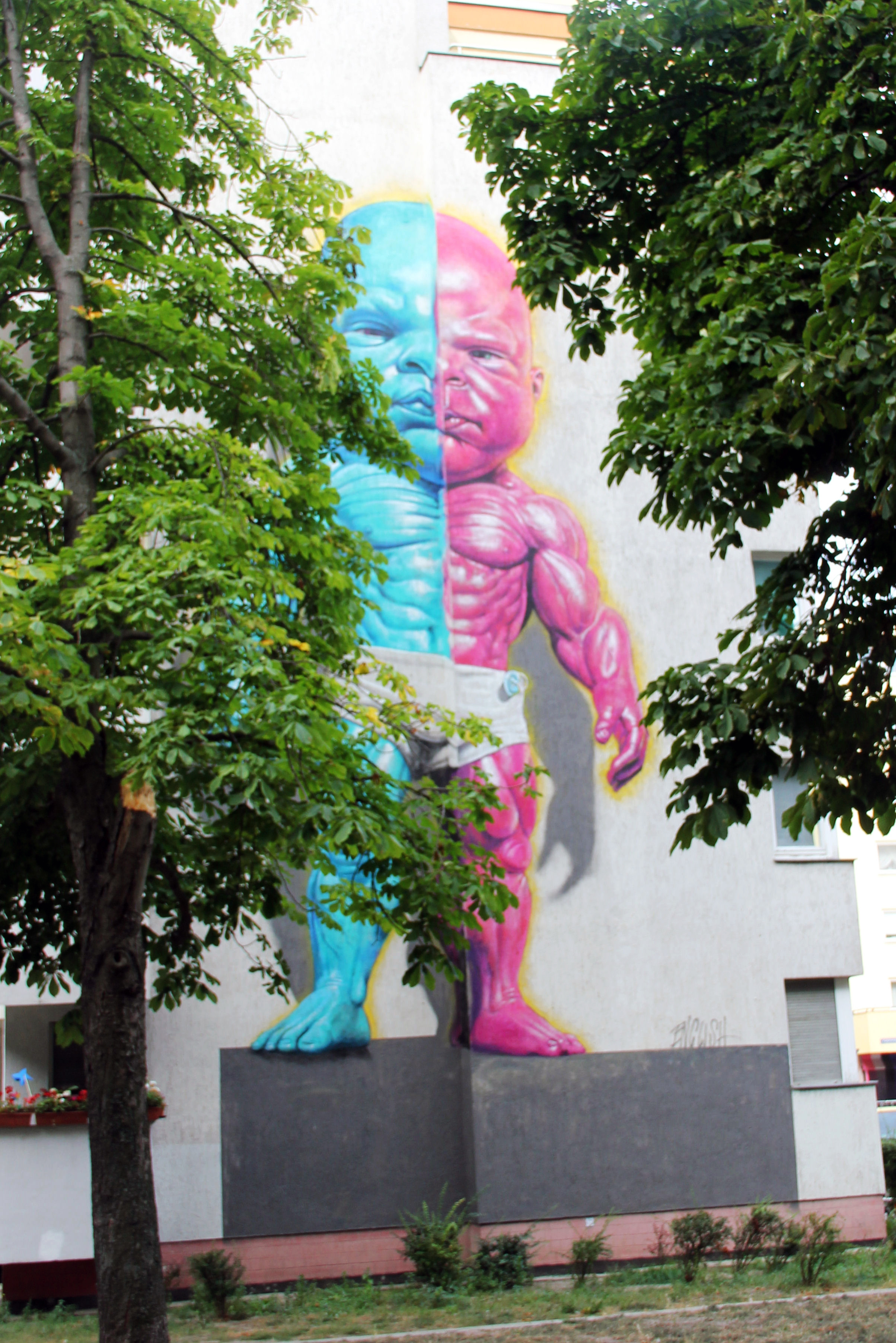
Wandmalerei Wassertorstr 64 (Kreuz) Mural (2018)

Since the early 1980s, English has painted on buildings, billboards and other outdoor surfaces. English also paints commissioned murals, for example the Richmond Mural Project in Richmond, Virginia, and a series of large-scale POPaganda murals produced in Jersey City as part of municipal and developer-sponsored public art initiatives and legal murals in Southern California.

=== Culture jamming ===
English's billboard work has been described "culture jamming" or "subvertising", using commercial advertising space as a site for critical interventions. A career monograph published by Last Gasp describes him as a "seminal figure in the subvertising, or culture jamming movement" and states that he has "pirated over a thousand billboards" by replacing existing advertisements with hand-painted parodies. British newspaper coverage characterises these actions as a "guerrilla war against corporate America", such as long-running campaigns in which English and collaborators repaint or paste over cigarette, liquor and fast-food advertising.

Recurring billboard images that rework corporate mascots and logos include anti-smoking pieces that parody Joe Camel and fast-food imagery featuring obese or distorted versions of Ronald McDonald and other mascots, as well as political figures rendered with skeletal "grin" faces. These characters are deliberately grotesque, designed to draw viewers toward familiar branding while redirecting attention to issues such as obesity, addiction and political propaganda.

He has applied similar strategies to product packaging and smaller-scale advertising formats; for example he designed spoof cereal boxes, cigarette packets and other packages and then placed them on shop shelves through "reverse shoplifting" or "shop gifting", allowing shoppers to encounter the parodies in ordinary retail environments.

== Fine art ==
English also creates oil paintings in a photorealistic style that includes pop imagery and themes of revisiting childhood from an adult perspective. The exhibition Ron English: Guernica was held in 2016 at Allouche Gallery, which presented paintings reworking Picasso's composition combined with English's characters. He has also worked with religious iconography and art historical imagery, for example, Leonardo da Vinci’s Last Supper, Vincent van Gogh’s Starry Night and, in particular, Pablo Picasso’s Guernica, using them as frameworks for contemporary allegories about war, advertising and mass media.

Among his Guernica-based works, the painting Grade School Guernica (1980) restages Picasso’s scene with English’s children as protagonists, seen from the vantage point of the bomber aircraft; the Gernika Peace Museum notes that the work was exhibited at Houston’s Station Museum of Contemporary Art and that English has since produced more than fifty further variations on the Guernica template. He continued this theme in later projects such as the London exhibition Lazarus Rising at Elms Lesters Painting Rooms, which included canvases based on the Guernica composition, and the 2016 New York show Ron English: Guernica at Allouche Gallery, which presented new large-scale paintings reimagining Picasso’s work.

English’s fine-art exhibitions include Lazarus Rising, described by Elms Lesters and contemporary art press as his first UK solo show and accompanied by a limited-edition catalogue; Seasons in Supurbia (2009) at Corey Helford Gallery in Culver City, which LA Weekly characterised as a “perverted spoofing” of Disney, G.I. Joe and Peanuts iconography; and Skin Deep: Post-Instinctual Afterthoughts on Psychological Portraiture (2011) at Lazarides in London, a solo exhibition focused on psychological portraits of historical and pop-culture figures.

== Books ==
- Original Grin: The Art of Ron English (2019)
- POPaganda: The Art & Subversion of Ron English (2004)
- Ron English's Fauxlosophy (2016)
- Ron English's Popaganda Coloring Book (2017)
- Ron English's Vandalism Starter Kit (2014)
- Lazarus Rising (2009)
- Art for Obama (2009)
- Abject Expressionism (2007)
- Son of Pop: Ron English Paints His Progeny (2007)
- Abraham Obama (2010)
- Art is a Horrible Waste of the Imagination (1988)
- Status Factory (2014)
- Death and the Eternal Forever (2014)
