= Bart Stops to Smell the Roosevelts =

- The Simpsons episode
- Episode no.: Season 23; Episode 2
- Directed by: Steven Dean Moore
- Written by: Tim Long
- Production code: NABF17
- Original air date: October 2, 2011

Guest appearance
- Theodore Roosevelt (archive recordings)

Episode features
- Chalkboard gag: "It's not too early to speculate about the 2016 election"
- Couch gag: A John Kricfalusi-animated couch gag where Homer demands a beer and Marge gets it for him.

Episode chronology
← Previous "The Falcon and the D'ohman"	Next → "Treehouse of Horror XXII"
- The Simpsons season 23

"Bart Stops to Smell the Roosevelts" is the second episode of the twenty-third season of the American animated television series The Simpsons. It originally aired on the Fox network in the United States on October 2, 2011. The episode was the first to feature Superintendent Chalmers as the central character and Chalmers' flashbacks references the films The Breakfast Club and Fight Club. In this episode, Principal Skinner challenges Superintendent Chalmers to take over Bart's education after one of his pranks. Chalmers accepts and starts teaching Bart about Theodore Roosevelt and manliness. After he takes Bart and his friends on an unauthorized field trip which results in one of the children breaking an arm, Chalmers is fired. Bart and his friends then take over the school in an effort to save his job.

The episode was written by Tim Long, directed by Steven Dean Moore, and features the voice of Theodore Roosevelt through archive recordings. The opening sequence was guest-directed by Canadian animator John Kricfalusi, who previously created the animated television show, The Ren & Stimpy Show. In its original American broadcast, it was viewed by approximately 6.19 million people. Since airing, the episode has received generally positive reviews from television critics, with the guest-directed opening sequence by Kricfalusi receiving the most praise.

== Plot ==
Springfield Elementary School is hosting a fundraiser auction and invites all the families with children in their classes, including the Simpson family. Every item in the auction is sold to an English widow named Edith Knickertwist, who is bidding over the phone. When the auction is over, Bart reveals that he was the real Mrs. Knickertwist and that there is no money for the school. Frustrated over Bart's latest prank and pressured by his supervisor Superintendent Chalmers, Principal Skinner challenges Chalmers to take over Bart's education. Chalmers accepts and immediately gives Bart his own lesson plan, which primarily consists of former U.S. president Theodore Roosevelt. He makes Bart interested in the subject by talking about Roosevelt's heroic and rebellious nature. Classmates Milhouse, Nelson, Jimbo, Kearney and Dolph soon join Bart in his education.

With the success of his lessons, Chalmers plans to take them all on a field trip to Springfield Forest, in which Roosevelt left one of his spectacles. The field trip does not go well, however, as Nelson breaks his arm when he tries to reach for the spectacles. Since it was an unauthorized field trip, Nelson's mother threatens to sue the school for medical expenses, which leads to Chalmers getting fired. In order to save Chalmers' job, Bart and his friends, who now go by the name "The Brotherhood of the Spectacles", take over the school in a hostage situation and stand up for the teacher who made a meaningful impact to them. They lock all of the teachers out of the school and demand that Chalmers get reinstated. A SWAT team prepares to storm the school, before Chalmers walks up to convince Bart to stop. Luckily, Chief Wiggum accidentally drops his gun, knee-capping the school representative State Comptroller Atkins, who thereafter agrees to reinstate Chalmers because they can recover the money lost in the previous lawsuit with a new lawsuit against the police department. With Chalmers' job saved, Bart continues his lessons with him.

== Production ==
"Bart Stops to Smell the Roosevelts" was written by Tim Long and directed by Steven Dean Moore. The episode features former American President Theodore Roosevelt with the use of archival audio recordings. The use of Roosevelt's voice was first announced at San Diego Comic-Con in San Diego, California, on July 23, 2011. Showrunner Al Jean revealed to the press that "we [the staff] have actual audio of Roosevelt (taken from a speech circa 1918) in the show. I thought, 'Finally! We can put a president in the show.' And a good one too. We're going to give him a little credit at the end." This appearance makes Theodore Roosevelt the only US president to date to portray themselves on The Simpsons.

Even though Superintendent Chalmers was first introduced in the season four episode "Whacking Day", the character had never been a central part to an episode. This episode marks the first time in which the entire episode follows Chalmers. In Chalmers' flashback from his teaching days, the scene looks like the library of Shermer High School from the film The Breakfast Club from 1985. The students however refer to the club as Fight Club.

=== Opening sequence ===
Canadian animator and creator of The Ren & Stimpy Show, John Kricfalusi, guest animated the couch gag for the episode. This was the second time The Simpsons had chosen a guest director for its opening sequence, following the previous season's episode "MoneyBart", which was guest-directed by British graffiti artist and political activist Banksy, and was Kricfalusi's first one for the show as a whole. Previously, Kricfalusi had criticized The Simpsons staff in the show's early years by saying that "the show succeeded despite the writing" and similarly derogatory comments. The producers responded with the fourth season episode "The Front" (1993), in which The Ren & Stimpy Show is nominated for a cartoon award. During the award ceremony, the clip from the nominated episode is merely a black screen with the text "Clip not done yet", a comment on the slow production time of the show. The show was mentioned again in the season six episode "Another Simpsons Clip Show" (1994), when Lisa claims that Ren & Stimpy recycles animation to make new episodes, while referencing Itchy & Scratchy's habit of doing the same. Despite this, Kricfalusi changed his tone in an interview with Aaron Simpson in 2007 and claimed that The Simpsons made it easier to do more edgy work: "Well it started with Bakshi’s Mighty Mouse: The New Adventures and Pee Wee Herman. Those were kid shows, but with layers of perversion in them. Then The Simpsons came along and did edgy material in prime time cartoons."

The Simpson family was drawn off-model in a style similar to Kricfalusi's earlier work.

After the positive response to the opening sequence by Banksy, creator Matt Groening and Jean came to Kricfalusi and asked him if he could do something similar. Originally, they only wanted him to do the storyboards and then let their regular crew animate it, but Kricfalusi insisted on doing the animation himself, explaining that "If we had done it that way, no one would even have known that I had anything to do with it because it would have ended up on model and all pose to pose". On The Simpsons, the animators draw key poses and then let tweeners interpolate between those poses. The interpolation however, is a straight a to b animation. That way the animation ends up having the characters just going from pose to pose. Kricfalusi explains that on The Simpsons he "wanted to try moving the characters in crazy fun ways, not just looking funny each time they come to a stop", and further elaborated "that the way things happened was even more important than what was happening in my work. You can’t write visual performance. You have to actually draw it."

This project was the most fun I’ve had in years. It has really hammered home (to me) the importance of animation in animation. I think it’s possible to bring animation back to this country and make the core of it fun again, not be a mere tertiary addition to some high concept or executive’s “vision.” The pure act of animating is the most fun part of animation. I am so grateful to Matt for letting me have some real fun this summer.

— John Kricfalusi

He showed Groening and Jean his Adult Swim shorts and Groening responded by giving him free hands to do the 35-second-long segment. Groening told him to break all The Simpsons rules, but Kricfalusi explains that he "tried not to break any rules in the characters’ personalities, just in the execution of the visuals. I didn't follow any models—not even my own". The more rules he broke, the more pleased Groening and Jean were with the result. Contrary to Banksy, who works in secrecy, Kricfalusi was involved in every detail and even oversaw the dubbing of the final soundtrack. While Kricfalusi animated the 2D parts, he had John Kedzie to help him with the computer graphics and Sarah Harkey and Tommy Tanner to do the assistant animation.

In an interview by Neil Bennett from Digital Arts Magazine, Kricfalusi revealed that he would have taken a different approach to the animation if he were to animate the entire episode. Primarily, the animation would be slower-paced than it was in the 35-second-long segment. The couch gag was done at a faster pace so he was able to include all of his ideas. Kricfalusi explains that "[if I did a whole episode], I would definitely keep on experimenting with the way they move and the acting. I'm sure I would do of my trademark long scenes of two characters interacting with each other without a cut. I would [also] want to do more stuff with Marge. I loved animating her and was inspired by the way the Fleischers animated Olive Oyl. I couldn't animate a whole half hour myself, so I would hire other animators (and designers, painters, etc.) with strong styles and cast them according to which parts of the story would best take advantage of their individual talent."

== Release ==
The episode originally aired on the Fox network in the United States on October 2, 2011. It was watched by approximately 6.19 million people during this broadcast. The show received a 3.0 Nielsen rating in the demographic for adults aged 18–49, which was a 23% drop from the season premiere episode, and an eight percent audience share. The Simpsons became the second highest-rated program in Fox's Animation Domination lineup that night in terms of total viewers and in the 18–49 demographic, finishing with a higher rating than The Cleveland Show and American Dad!, but a lower rating than Family Guy. These three other animated shows were part of a crossover event, called Night of the Hurricane, in which they shared the same storyline. For the week of September 26 – October 2, 2011, "Bart Stops to Smell the Roosevelts" tied for 29th place in the ratings among all network prime-time broadcasts in the 18–49 demographic.

Since airing, "Bart Stops to Smell the Roosevelts" has been well received by television critics. Hayden Childs of The A.V. Club gave this episode a "B" rating and commented that "The Simpsons episodes that strive to have a little heart without going overboard are generally going to work better than the random-gag episodes, at least at this point in the storied history of The Simpsons, and 'Bart Stops To Smell The Roosevelts' has enough wee little heart to see this episode through", but further wrote that "there were a number of jokes that didn't work, Milhouse's final scene in particular, but the episode had a steady stream of gags to push through the lean times. And that's all we can ask for." Ology's Josh Harrison was also positive and gave the episode a rating of seven out of ten, while commenting that he "thought this was a definite downgrade from the season premiere in terms of sheer comedic value, but the sincerity of Bart's educational experience, combined with the enthusiasm of his mad quest for justice, definitely made this one a winner."

The couch gag for the episode was acclaimed by television critics. Amid Amidi of Cartoon Brew called the opening revolutionary and explained that "in 35 short and sweet seconds, he liberates the animation of The Simpsons from years of graphic banality." He continued: "The visual look of the show, which has been so carefully controlled by its producers, becomes a giddy and unrestrained playground for graphic play, and the balance of creative authority is shifted from the writers' room to the animators in one fell swoop." When comparing the segment to Banksy's, Amidi concluded that it is "in fact, far more subversive because he focuses almost exclusively on making a pictorial statement, relegating the show's dominant literary elements to the back seat." Similarly, Television Blend's Katey Rich wrote that she appreciates "The Simpsons always being willing to push the envelope in different ways", but admitted that it would take her "some time to get the gangly-legged Marge Simpson and the leering Homer Simpson out of [her] brain."

Tim Long was nominated for a Writers Guild of America Award for Outstanding Writing in Animation at the 64th Writers Guild of America Awards for his script to this episode.
