= Marc Wilmore =

American writer (1963–2021)

- Born: Marc Edward Wilmore; May 4, 1963; Fontana, California, U.S.
- Died: January 30, 2021 (aged 57); Pomona, California, U.S.
- Occupation(s): Television writer, producer, actor, comedian
- Years active: 1992–2021
- Spouse: Soumaya Wilmore
- Relatives: Larry Wilmore (brother)

Marc Edward Wilmore (May 4, 1963 – January 30, 2021) was an American television writer, producer, actor, and comedian. He wrote and performed for shows such as In Living Color, The PJs, The Simpsons, and F Is for Family. Wilmore was a 10-time Primetime Emmy Award nominee. He was the younger brother of comedian Larry Wilmore.

== Life and career ==
Marc Edward Wilmore was born on May 4, 1963, to parents Betty and Larry in Fontana, California. He had five siblings, one of whom, older brother Larry, is a television comic. He was a graduate of California State Polytechnic University, Pomona.

In the early 1990s, Wilmore got a job as a writer on the sketch comedy series In Living Color. He was promoted to cast member during the show's final season. Wilmore's impersonations included Isabel Sanford, Nell Carter, Carroll O'Connor, Robert Guillaume, Maya Angelou and James Earl Jones, and various sketches which re-imagined various television series such as All in the Family and The Mary Tyler Moore Show if they starred African-Americans. He received a nomination for the Primetime Emmy Award for Outstanding Writing for a Variety Series for his work on the show. After In Living Color, Wilmore wrote for The Tonight Show Starring Jay Leno and The PJs, a stop-motion adult sitcom co-created by his older brother Larry, where he also provided the voice of crooked police officer Walter Burkett.

While working on The PJs, Wilmore participated in a prank organized by staff members of The Simpsons, where he pretended he was the mayor of East St. Louis, Illinois and angrily accosted writer Matt Selman over a joke that denigrated the city in the episode "They Saved Lisa's Brain". As compensation for his involvement with the joke, Wilmore was given a role in the season 11 episode "It's a Mad, Mad, Mad, Mad Marge", in which he played a psychologist. Wilmore joined The Simpsons's writing staff in the show's thirteenth season, and received his first credit for the segment "Send in the Clones" in "Treehouse of Horror XIII". He won a Primetime Emmy Award for Outstanding Animated Program as a producer for the episode "Eternal Moonshine of the Simpson Mind" at the 60th Primetime Emmy Awards in 2008. In the 2010s, Wilmore worked as a writer and executive producer on F Is for Family, an animated sitcom co-created by Michael Price, who had worked with him on The PJs and The Simpsons. Wilmore also provided several voices in the series.

== Death ==
On January 30, 2021, Wilmore died at a hospital in Pomona, California. He was 57. According to his brother Larry, he died "while battling COVID and other conditions that have had him in pain for many years" amid the COVID-19 pandemic in the United States. In The New York Times, Larry Wilmore related that his younger brother had long suffered health issues relating to a kidney transplant he had undergone in the 1990s.

The penultimate episode of F Is for Family, "A Very Merry F***ing Christmas", is dedicated to him, as well as The Simpsons episode "Wad Goals".

== Credits ==
Year	Show	Role
1992–1994	In Living Color	Writer, cast member
1995–1998	The Tonight Show with Jay Leno	Writer
1999–2001	The PJs	Writer; Voice actor (Walter Burkett)
2000, 2002–2015	The Simpsons	Writer; Guest voice actor
2017–2020	F Is for Family	Writer; Executive producer Additional voices
