= The Bob Next Door =

23nd episode of the 21st season of The Simpsons

- The Simpsons episode
- Promotional image for the episode featuring Bart, Sideshow Bob (with Walt’s face) Walt Warren (with Bob’s face), the Simpsons' new neighbor who Bart knows is Sideshow Bob in disguise.
- Episode no.: Season 21; Episode 22
- Directed by: Nancy Kruse
- Written by: John Frink
- Production code: MABF11
- Original air date: May 16, 2010

Guest appearance
- Kelsey Grammer as Sideshow Bob

Episode features
- Chalkboard gag: "Batman is not 'nothing without his utility belt'"
- Couch gag: Harold from Harold and the Purple Crayon draws the Simpsons' living room before the family arrives, then draws a can of beer for Homer at his request.

Episode chronology
← Previous "Moe Letter Blues"	Next → "Judge Me Tender"
- The Simpsons season 21

"The Bob Next Door" is the twenty-second and penultimate episode of the twenty-first season of the American animated television series The Simpsons. It originally aired on the Fox network in the United States on May 16, 2010. In the episode, Bart Simpson becomes convinced that their new neighbor is Sideshow Bob in disguise, but after a trip to the Springfield Penitentiary they find a distressed Bob still incarcerated. Eventually, Bart discovers that Bob has surgically swapped faces with Walt, who was his cellmate at that time, and still plans to kill him, although he is ultimately defeated.

The episode was written by John Frink and directed by Nancy Kruse. The episode guest stars Kelsey Grammer as Sideshow Bob and its plot is based on the film Face/Off.

"The Bob Next Door" received positive reviews from critics; most agreed that it was a funny and exciting return to form for Sideshow Bob after "The Italian Bob" and "Funeral for a Fiend".

== Plot ==
A financial crisis in Springfield causes the sale of many houses and release of all low-level criminals from Springfield Penitentiary, including a man named Walt Warren, who purchases a house next door to the Simpson family and charms the neighborhood. However, Bart is convinced that Walt is Sideshow Bob in disguise because they have the same voice and tries several times to find proof, but fails. Marge convinces him otherwise by taking him to the penitentiary, where they see Bob locked in a padded cell, wearing a straitjacket and writing "Bart Simpson Will Die!" on the walls. A seemingly reassured Bart decides to go to a baseball game with Walt, who removes his small shoes to show long feet folded inside, revealing himself to be Sideshow Bob. He restrains Bart in the car and gags him with duct tape, planning to take him to Five Corners, a location where five states meet, to kill him.

Meanwhile, the real Walt Warren escapes prison while bearing Bob's hair and face and comes to the Simpsons' home. At first, everyone thinks Bob has escaped, but Walt's short feet reveal his true identity. Walt explains that he and Bob were cellmates and, prior to Walt's release, Bob drugged him and performed a transplant to switch their faces. The transplant left Walt unable to talk properly, resulting in him being detained in the padded cell. He wrote his message on the wall as a warning, but it was misinterpreted as a threat. As Walt and the Simpsons go after Bob, a waitress at a roadside diner becomes infatuated with Bob until she peels off Walt's face. Amidst a distraction outside the diner, Homer, Marge and Lisa travel to Mexico in search of Bart while Walt gets away and continues to the Five Corners.

At the Five Corners, Bob intends to kill Bart in such a way that the crime takes place in all five states – he will stand in the first, fire his gun in the second, the bullet will travel through the third en route to hitting Bart in the fourth as he then falls dead in the fifth, thus making it impossible to prosecute. Bart stalls by repeatedly jumping into the same state as Bob until Walt arrives. Walt and Bob struggle over the gun, but just before Bob can fire on either Walt or Bart, Chief Wiggum and the Springfield Police Department arrive to arrest Bob. Wiggum reveals that Bart had reported his suspicions to the police, who confirmed Bob's identity through DNA profiling and tracked the GPS in his car. Bob jumps into the other states in order to escape their jurisdiction, only to be promptly confronted by police from each state and taken into custody. Walt is then officially released while Bob's house is bought by Ned Flanders' cousin Ted and Homer is annoyed at the realization that he now lives next door to two Flanders families.

== Production ==
The episode was written by John Frink, his second writing of the season after "Stealing First Base". It is also his third Sideshow Bob writing credit after "The Great Louse Detective" and "The Italian Bob". The episode was directed by Nancy Kruse, her second director's credit for the season after "The Devil Wears Nada". It features the return of recurring guest voice Kelsey Grammer to voice recurring character Sideshow Bob, making it his 11th major episode and 13th vocal appearance. The episode was originally slated to air on January 14, 2010, along with "Once Upon a Time in Springfield" and The Simpsons 20th Anniversary Special – In 3-D! On Ice!.

== Cultural references ==
The plot to "The Bob Next Door" is based on the film Face/Off. The opening couch gag also features Harold from the 1955 children's book Harold and the Purple Crayon. Bart tries to tempt Walt to sing "Three Little Maids From School Are We" from The Mikado; the same song was also used in an earlier episode, "Cape Feare", which also featured Sideshow Bob. Later in the episode, when Sideshow Bob reveals his true identity, he exclaims he is now "able to sing all the Gilbert & Sullivan I damn well please", followed by him pulling a Japanese fan out of the glove box and singing the opening notes of "Behold The Lord High Executioner", another number from The Mikado, to Bart's horror. Marge and Homer tell Bart that a lot of people have voices like Sideshow Bob's, such as "Frasier on Cheers, Frasier on Frasier or Lt. Cmdr. Tom Dodge in Down Periscope." These characters were played by Sideshow Bob's voice actor, Kelsey Grammer. When Sideshow Bob steps on the rake it is a callback to a scene in "Cape Feare" in which he steps on multiple rakes.

== Reception ==
In its original American broadcast on the Fox network on May 16, 2010, "The Bob Next Door" was viewed by an estimated 6.258 million households and got a 2.9 rating/9 share in the 18–49 demographic. It came second in its time slot after the season finale of Survivor: Heroes vs. Villains and became the second highest-rated show in Fox's "Animation Domination" programming block after a new episode of Family Guy, according to the Nielsen Media Research.

The episode received positive reviews.

Robert Canning of IGN gave it an 8.5 rating, stating that it was "Great" and "Overall, this was a great return to form for an appearance from Sideshow Bob. The vengeful character has been let down by recent episodes, but 'The Bob Next Door' has reminded us what makes Bob so much fun." Canning later named "The Bob Next Door" the best episode of the season tied with "The Squirt and the Whale".

TV Fanatic gave the episode four out of five and stated that they enjoyed the plot twists but thought the jokes were unfunny, remarking that "the episode just didn't have the same humor as say, 'Cape Feare'."

John Teti of The A.V. Club gave the episode a B+. He stated that "The showdown at Five Corners played out just like 'Cape Feare,' complete with rake gag, which is not a bad thing. If The Simpsons intends to self-plagiarize (and it obviously does), that's a good episode to copy."

Sharon Knolle of AOL TV said, "I'd say overall this ep ranks with some of the better Sideshow Bob eps, if not the very best. Certainly, it beats the heck out of 'The Italian Bob' and 'Funeral for a Fiend.'"
