= The Simpsons season 21 =

Season of television series

The Simpsons
- Season 21
- Digital purchase image featuring Mr. Burns
- Showrunner: Al Jean
- No. of episodes: 23

Release
- Original network: Fox
- Original release: September 27, 2009 – May 23, 2010

Season chronology
- ← Previous; Season 20 Next → Season 22

The twenty-first season of the American animated sitcom The Simpsons aired on Fox between September 27, 2009, and May 23, 2010. It was the first of two seasons that the show was renewed for by Fox, and also the first season of the show to air entirely in high definition, the twentieth season having nine holdover episodes from the nineteenth season that were in standard definition. The season was produced by Gracie Films and 20th Century Fox Television. Executive producer Al Jean remained the showrunner.

With this season, The Simpsons established itself as the longest-running American primetime television series surpassing Gunsmoke.

The season received mainly positive reviews from critics, with many praising "The Squirt and the Whale", "To Surveil with Love" and "The Bob Next Door". The show moved up 16 positions in the Nielsen ratings from the previous season and received numerous award nominations, winning two — an Emmy Award for Anne Hathaway for her voice work in "Once Upon a Time in Springfield", and an Annie Award for "Treehouse of Horror XX".

== Voice cast & characters ==
=== Main cast ===
- Dan Castellaneta as Homer Simpson, Krusty the Clown, Mr. Teeny, Itchy, Santa's Little Helper, Squeaky-Voiced Teen, Groundskeeper Willie, Sideshow Mel, Blue-Haired Lawyer, Barney Gumble, Hans Moleman, Grampa Simpson, Kodos, Louie, Frankie the Squealer, Mayor Quimby, Lance Murdock, Snowball II, Rich Texan and various others
- Julie Kavner as Marge Simpson, Selma Bouvier, Patty Bouvier and Jacqueline Bouvier
- Nancy Cartwright as Bart Simpson, Nelson Muntz, Kearney Zzyzwicz, Ralph Wiggum, Todd Flanders, and various others
- Yeardley Smith as Lisa Simpson
- Hank Azaria as Comic Book Guy, Carl Carlson, Apu Nahasapeemapetilon, Moe Szyslak, Disco Stu, Drederick Tatum, Akira Kurosawa, Chief Wiggum, Julio, Cletus Spuckler, Johnny Tightlips, Superintendent Chalmers, Old Jewish Man, Coach Krupt, Bumblebee Man, Lou, Kirk Van Houten, Snake, Duffman, The Parson, Dr. Nick Riviera and various others
- Harry Shearer as Lenny Leonard, Scratchy, Dr. Hibbert, Dewey Largo, Principal Skinner, Ned Flanders, Otto Mann, Mr. Burns, Kent Brockman, Rainier Wolfcastle, Reverend Lovejoy, Kang, Judge Snyder, Jasper Beardly, Waylon Smithers, Eddie and various others

=== Supporting cast ===
- Pamela Hayden as Milhouse Van Houten, Jimbo Jones, Sarah Wiggum, Rod Flanders, Janey Powell and various others
- Tress MacNeille as Crazy Cat Lady, Bernice Hibbert, Dolph Shapiro, Agnes Skinner, Mrs. Muntz, Manjula Nahasapeemapetilon, Brandine Spuckler, Dubya Spuckler, Whitney Spuckler, Medicine Woman, Audrey McConnell, Cookie Kwan, Lunchlady Dora, Miss Springfield, Shauna Chalmers, Mrs. Vanderbilt, Lindsay Naegle and various others
- Karl Wiedergott as additional characters
- Russi Taylor as Martin Prince, Sherri, Terri and Üter Zörker
- Maggie Roswell as Luann Van Houten, Helen Lovejoy, Elizabeth Hoover, Maude Flanders and various others

==== Special guest cast ====
- Marcia Wallace as Edna Krabappel
  (8 episodes)
- Seth Rogen as Lyle McCarthy
  ("Homer the Whopper")
- Matt Groening as himself
  ("Homer the Whopper")
- Kevin Michael Richardson as the security guard
  ("Homer the Whopper")
- Chuck Liddell as himself
  ("The Great Wife Hope")
- Jonah Hill as Andy Hamilton
  ("Pranks and Greens")
- Neve Campbell as Cassandra
  ("Rednecks and Broomsticks")
- Kim Cattrall as The Fourth Simpson Child
  ("O Brother, Where Bart Thou")
- Huell Howser as himself
  ("O Brother, Where Bart Thou")
- Cooper Manning as himself
  ("O Brother, Where Bart Thou")
- Eli Manning as himself
  ("O Brother, Where Bart Thou")
- Peyton Manning as himself
  ("O Brother, Where Bart Thou")
- Jordan Nagai as Charlie
  ("O Brother, Where Bart Thou")
- Dick Smothers as himself
  ("O Brother, Where Bart Thou")
- Tom Smothers as himself
  ("O Brother, Where Bart Thou")
- Mitch Albom as himself
  ("Thursdays with Abie")
- Anne Hathaway as Princess Penelope
  ("Once Upon a Time in Springfield")
- Eartha Kitt as herself
  ("Once Upon a Time in Springfield", posthumous release)
- Maurice LaMarche as Nuclear Power Plant Security Guard
  ("Once Upon a Time in Springfield")
- Gary Larson as himself
  ("Once Upon a Time in Springfield")
- Jackie Mason as Rabbi Hyman Krustofsky
  ("Once Upon a Time in Springfield")
- Chris Martin as himself
  ("Million Dollar Maybe")

== Episodes ==
No. overall	No. in season	Title	Directed by	Written by	Original release date	Prod. code	U.S. viewers (millions)
442	1	"Homer the Whopper"	Lance Kramer	Seth Rogen & Evan Goldberg	September 27, 2009	LABF13	8.31
Comic Book Guy creates a new superhero called Everyman who takes powers from other superheroes. Homer is cast as the lead in the film adaptation. To get Homer into shape, the movie studio hires celebrity fitness trainer Lyle McCarthy to help him. Homer gets into great shape, but when the trainer leaves to work on another movie, Homer regains his weight. As a result, the movie contains scenes of Homer with different body types. The premiere is disastrous, and Comic Book Guy gives it a terrible review. Because the move is not profitable, sequels are prohibited from being made. Guest Stars: Seth Rogen, Matt Groening and Kevin Michael Richardson
443	2	"Bart Gets a "Z""	Mark Kirkland	Matt Selman	October 4, 2009	LABF15	9.37
Edna Krabappel is fired for drinking alcohol on the job because her students added it to her coffee. She is replaced with a young teacher named Zachary Vaughn. Although Bart likes his new teacher, he feels guilty for getting Edna fired, so he gets her a self-help book to help fulfill her dreams. She opens a muffin shop. When Bart confesses what he did, Edna is angered because her real dream is to be a teacher and calls Bart a bad boy. He tells Principal Skinner what he did, but he is unable to rehire Edna. When Zachary gets drunk and insults the schoolchildren, Edna returns and forces the students to eat her muffins as punishment.
444	3	"The Great Wife Hope"	Matthew Faughnan	Carolyn Omine	October 11, 2009	LABF16	7.60
When the men and boys of Springfield become obsessed with mixed martial arts, Marge leads a protest when she catches Bart fighting in school. The sport's creator, Chett Englebrit, agrees to end it if Marge defeats him in a match. After training, the match begins with Chett immediately knocking down Marge. When Bart enters the ring to defend her, Chett injures him. Enraged, Marge knocks out Chett. Victorious, Marge makes a speech about ending violence, but the audience has already gone to the parking lot to watch two other people fight. Guest Star: Chuck Liddell
445	4	"Treehouse of Horror XX"	Mike B. Anderson & Matthew Schofield	Daniel Chun	October 18, 2009	LABF14	8.69
In the twentieth annual Simpsons Halloween special: "Dial "M" for Murder or Press "#" to Return to Main Menu": Lisa conspires with Bart to get revenge on their teachers after Ms. Hoover sends Lisa to detention. However, when Bart kills Hoover, but Lisa does not kill Mrs. Krabappel, he tries to blackmail her. To stop him, Lisa chases Bart with a knife until she declares she is not a murderer. She throws the knife away, but it flies back and kills Bart.; "Don't Have a Cow, Mankind": Krusty the Clown introduces a new hamburger made from cows that have eaten other cows. The burgers turn the townsfolk into zombies, but the Simpsons have survived. When they learn Bart is immune, the family make their way to a safe zone to develop a cure. Upon arrival, Bart is made to bathe in people's food to gain immunity.; "There's No Business Like Moe Business": Moe creates a new beer that becomes a sensation thanks to Homer being impaled on the microbrew machine and bleeding into the beer supply. Moe tries to woo Marge by saying Homer left her, but Homer returns and hurls Moe away to reunite with Marge.
446	5	"The Devil Wears Nada"	Nancy Kruse	Tim Long	November 15, 2009	LABF17	9.13
Marge becomes a sex symbol after pin-up pictures of her appear on a calendar. Meanwhile, Carl Carlson is chosen as the Springfield Nuclear Plant's newest supervisor, and Homer gets hired as Carl's assistant. Homer is quickly exhausted by his work and is unable to be with Marge, whose libido has increased because of the calendar shoot. When Homer and Carl go to Paris on business, an angry Marge accidentally hurts Ned, so she invites him over for dinner. When Carl flirts with a woman in Paris, Homer blackmails him to get his old job back. Meanwhile, Marge is tempted to kiss Ned at dinner until she sees her wedding photo and stops herself.
447	6	"Pranks and Greens"	Chuck Sheetz	Jeff Westbrook	November 22, 2009	LABF18	6.88
Bart learns that the best prankster in Springfield Elementary history was Andy Hamilton, who trapped Principal Skinner in a pool of worms for three days. Bart finds him and sees that he is unemployed and living with his mother. Bart gets him a job as Krusty's assistant. When he learns that Krusty made a large order for worms, he is worried that Andy is repeating his prank. However, he learns that it is part of an act, and Andy has been made a writer on the show. Meanwhile, Marge is chastised by the other mothers in her social circle for not serving healthy snacks. At their next meeting, Marge serves healthy food, but when they see the food was prepared on pots containing dangerous chemicals, they immediately run to an ambulance. Marge realizes she prefers eating unhealthy food. Guest Star: Jonah Hill
448	7	"Rednecks and Broomsticks"	Bob Anderson & Rob Oliver	Kevin Curran	November 29, 2009	LABF19	8.87
As the Simpsons drive home from a vacation, Homer loses control of the car, and it lands in a frozen lake. Cletus rescues them, and he invites Homer to taste his moonshine. Bart and Lisa play with the Spuckler children, and Lisa gets lost in the woods and encounters three girls who are practicing Wiccans. Lisa is invited to join their coven, but they are arrested for witchcraft. They cast a spell, and some townsfolk at temporarily blinded. Although they are acquitted, the townsfolk decide to drown them. However, Lisa proves that their blindness was caused by Homer and Cletus throwing their moonshine into the river, the source of their drinking water, because they thought the police were coming to arrest them instead of the Wiccans. The girls are released. Guest Star: Neve Campbell
449	8	"O Brother, Where Bart Thou?"	Steven Dean Moore	Matt Selman	December 13, 2009	MABF01	6.97
Jealous of Lisa and Maggie's sisterly bond, Bart decides he wants a baby brother to call his own. He fails to convince Homer and Marge to have another child, so he tries to adapt a boy at an orphanage. Although he is denied, a boy named Charlie follows him home. Bart and Charlie have fun together, but when Charlies gets scared watching a horror movie, Bart learns he must be responsible with him. Lisa says Charlie needs to return to the orphanage, so Bart takes him back. Charlie is later adopted by a family with six daughters. Guest Stars: Eli Manning, Peyton Manning, Cooper Manning, Kim Cattrall, Jordan Nagai, Huell Howser and the Smothers Brothers
450	9	"Thursdays with Abie"	Mike Frank Polcino	Don Payne & Mitchell H. Glazer	January 3, 2010	MABF02	8.55
Grampa meets a human-interest journalist who writes and publishes Grampa's life stories. Homer wants to hear more stories, but Grampa rejects him. Homer tries to write Mr. Burns' stories and publish them in the newspaper, but the publisher turns him down. While there, he finds a story written by the journalist stating that Grampa died. Realizing the journalist plans to kill Grampa, Homer goes to rescue him, and he and Grampa reconcile. Meanwhile, Bart cares for a stuffed lamb as part of a class project. Uninterested, he gives it to Lisa who loses it down a storm drain, so Bart needs to go into the sewer to rescue it. Guest Star: Mitch Albom
451	10	"Once Upon a Time in Springfield"	Matthew Nastuk	Stephanie Gillis	January 10, 2010	LABF20	14.62
Krusty changes his show to get more girls to watch it by adding a princess character named Penelope. Krusty hates her at first until Princess Penelope reveals that she is Krusty's biggest fan. They fall in love and plan to get married. Bart, upset at the changes, tries to sabotage the wedding by bringing Krusty's former wives. Krusty feels unworthy of Penelope, so he cancels the wedding and Penelope leaves the show. Later, Krusty finds Penelope to apologize and says he has changed his mind. Meanwhile, a corporate recruiter encourages Homer, Lenny, and Carl to work for a nuclear plant in Capital City after Mr. Burns announces a moratorium on free donuts due to budget cuts. They accept the offer, but Burns persuades them to return by offering better donuts. Guest Stars: Anne Hathaway, Gary Larson, Jackie Mason, and Eartha Kitt.
452	11	"Million Dollar Maybe"	Chris Clements	Bill Odenkirk	January 31, 2010	MABF03	4.95
Homer and Marge are scheduled to give a toast at a wedding. Going separately, Homer stops to buy a lottery ticket even though it will make him late to the wedding. To make up for time, he drives recklessly and crashes. In the hospital, he learns he won a million dollars, but Marge does not know why he crashed. To cover his tracks, Homer begins spending his windfall on anonymous gifts for the family, one of which is hiring alternative rock band Coldplay to perform for Bart. When he discovers what happened to Homer, Bart threatens to tell Marge unless Homer embarrasses himself. Instead, Homer tells Marge, who does not care as long as they have each other. Meanwhile, Lisa buys a video game system for the retirement home. However, the nurses destroy it because of the extra work they need to do after the seniors play with it. Guest Star: Chris Martin
453	12	"Boy Meets Curl"	Chuck Sheetz	Rob LaZebnik	February 14, 2010	MABF05	5.85
Homer and Marge try curling and discover that Marge is talented due to her experience sweeping floors. They are invited by Agnes and Principal Skinner to join their mixed curling team going to the Winter Olympics, which added the event as a demonstration sport. At the Olympics, Lisa begins collecting mascot pins. Performing well, the team wins the semi-final match, but Marge injures her right shoulder. They plan to forfeit the final match until Homer discovers that Marge has been hiding that she is left-handed. They return and win the gold medal. Meanwhile, Lisa, obsessed with the pins, trades her pearl necklace for more pins. When Bart discovers what she did, he creates a fake pin and trades it to get back her necklace. Guest Star: Bob Costas
454	13	"The Color Yellow"	Raymond S. Persi	Billy Kimball & Ian Maxtone-Graham	February 21, 2010	MABF06	5.98
Lisa discovers a diary of a Simpson ancestor named Eliza who meets a slave named Virgil. She tries to help him escape and are met by a patrol, but the diary disintegrates before Lisa can finish reading it. At the library, Lisa learns that they escaped to the Simpson house where Virgil impresses Eliza's father, which makes Lisa think Eliza was a hero. When Lisa presents the story at school, Milhouse disputes the story. He reads from a journal of his ancestor, who witnessed Eliza's father being bribed to return Virgil, and Eliza did not stop him. Later, Grampa tells a saddened Lisa that Eliza's mother, Mabel, and Virgil had secretly escaped to Canada together. They get married, and the Simpson family is actually descended from Virgil and Mabel. Guest Star: Wren T. Brown
455	14	"Postcards from the Wedge"	Mark Kirkland	Brian Kelley	March 14, 2010	MABF04	5.18
Once again, Homer and Marge try to discipline Bart after Mrs. Krabappel tells them that Bart has not been doing his homework, but Bart has a plan to manipulate Homer's strictness and Marge's sympathetic ear. Although they fight about what they should do, they reconcile and decide to ignore Bart. He realizes that he does not enjoy his antics unless someone is angered. He decides to destroy the school by driving the subway train under the school. When Marge and Homer learn from a note from Lisa about what Bart is going to do, Homer stops him in time. Bart is punished and is forced to update Homer about his homework. Lisa tells Bart that she knows it was Bart who actually wrote the note.
456	15	"Stealing First Base"	Steven Dean Moore	John Frink	March 21, 2010	MABF07	5.71
When Mrs. Krabappel takes an extended absence, her students join with the other fourth grade class where Bart falls for a girl named Nikki. The two are seen kissing, which leads to a ban on public displays of affection in the school. Nikki, however, alternates between loving and hating him whenever they kiss. When Bart falls off the roof of the school, the ban prevents anyone from touching him, so Nikki resuscitates him. Due to Nikki's continued erratic behavior, Bart ends their relationship. Meanwhile, when Lisa writes a post online about being disliked for being an overachiever, First Lady Michelle Obama comes to Springfield and makes a speech about the importance of academics. At the same time Nelson teaches a blind boy the art of being a schoolyard bully. He pranks Nelson when he says a punch to the face restored his sight. Guest Stars: Sarah Silverman and Angela Bassett
457	16	"The Greatest Story Ever D'ohed"	Mike Frank Polcino	Kevin Curran	March 28, 2010	MABF10	5.69
Ned Flanders reluctantly invites the Simpson family to join him on a church retreat to Jerusalem at the suggestion of Reverend Lovejoy. Homer is unappreciative of the culture, which annoys Ned. When Homer angers Ned for sleeping on Jesus' tomb, Homer thinks he went into the desert and goes after him. Lost and dehydrated, Homer has a hallucination in which he is named the new Messiah. When Homer is rescued, he goes and preaches that people of all faiths should come together. Ned is impressed, but Homer's message is lost in a crowd where they all think they are the Messiah. Guest Stars: Sacha Baron Cohen and Yael Naim.
458	17	"American History X-cellent"	Bob Anderson	Michael Price	April 11, 2010	MABF08	5.64
Mr. Burns is sent to jail for stealing valuable art. Smithers is left in charge at the power plant, and Homer and his friends begin taking advantage of his kindness. In prison, Burns' cellmate converts him into a Christian. When Smithers learns of what the employees are doing, he becomes crueler than Burns. Homer and his friends plan to break him out of prison, but Burns' is reluctant to leave until his evil returns. He learns he can use his wealth to buy his way out and resumes control of the power plant. Meanwhile, Bart and Lisa fight, and they break her ant farm. Santa's Little Helper eats all but one ant. They try to care for the ant, and they grow closer. When they decide to release it, the dog immediately eats it. Guest Stars: Joe Mantegna and Kevin Michael Richardson.
459	18	"Chief of Hearts"	Chris Clements	Carolyn Omine & William Wright	April 18, 2010	MABF09	5.83
When Homer accidentally appears to rob a bank, he is sentenced to community service. During his punishment, Homer offers Chief Wiggum a sandwich, and the two become friends. When Wiggum is shot trying to stop a robbery, Homer stays by his bedside in the hospital. When Wiggum becomes too needy, Homer leaves him, which angers Wiggum. When Homer goes to apologize, they witness Fat Tony making counterfeit shirts. Tony captures them and prepares to kill them until they fight back and escape. They reconcile and prank Flanders. Meanwhile, Bart becomes addicted to a Japanese kids' game called Battle Ball, which Marge confuses with dealing drugs. When Bart convinces Marge that what he is doing is legal, she thinks the game is cute, so Bart immediately stops playing. Guest Stars: Jane Kaczmarek, Maurice LaMarche and Joe Mantegna. Note: This is the first episode where Lisa (despite her presence) doesn't have a single line of dialogue.
460	19	"The Squirt and the Whale"	Lance Kramer	Matt Warburton	April 25, 2010	MABF14	5.92
Homer builds a wind turbine in the yard, but the house only gets electricity when the wind is blowing. Bart prays for more wind. When a windy storm comes through town, Bart and Lisa survey the damage and discover a beached whale. Lisa gets the townsfolk to help move the whale back to sea, but they fail. Lisa stays with the whale overnight, but the whale is dead when she wakes up. The police blow up the whale to get rid of the body. Later, Lisa spots two young whales offshore and assumes they are the whale's children. When sharks surround it, Lisa and Homer ride in a boat to kill them. When activists prevent them from killing the sharks, the father whale arrives to protect the young whales.
461	20	"To Surveil with Love"	Mark Kirkland	Michael Nobori	May 2, 2010	MABF12	6.03
Smithers hides plutonium in Homer's gym bag when the plant needs to get rid of its nuclear waste. When Homer forgets it at a train station, a bomb squad blows it up, and the town installs surveillance cameras to prevent possible terrorism. When the police tire of watching the footage from the cameras, Ned is hired, and he enjoys enforcing his values on others. Bart finds a blind spot in the camera network in the backyard, so the townsfolk pay Homer to do their misdeeds there. When Ned finds out, Homer says Ned was playing God. He apologizes, and the town takes down the cameras. Meanwhile, people assume Lisa is not intelligent because she has blonde hair. She dyes her hair brown. When she purposely gives a weak argument at a debate competition and wins anyways, she accuses the judges of prejudice over hair color and tells the audience not to stereotype people. Guest Star: Eddie Izzard
462	21	"Moe Letter Blues"	Matthew Nastuk	Stephanie Gillis	May 9, 2010	MABF13	5.67
Homer, Reverend Lovejoy and Apu receive a letter from Moe that states he will steal one of their wives. The three get together and try to remember intimate moments between Moe and their wives. Homer goes home, and Marge assures Homer that their marriage is fine. Helen also tells Lovejoy that nothing is wrong, but Apu finds Moe with Manjula. She says Moe convinced her to stay with Apu. Moe reveals that the three were taking their marriage for granted, so he wrote the letter to motivate them. Guest Star: Don Pardo
463	22	"The Bob Next Door"	Nancy Kruse	John Frink	May 16, 2010	MABF11	6.24
Bart becomes convinced that their new neighbor, Walt Warren, is Sideshow Bob in disguise. Marge does not believe him and personally takes Bart to the Springfield Maximum Security Prison to prove it. Bart is reassured until the neighbor reveals to Bart that he truly is Sideshow Bob. He kidnaps Bart and drives away to kill him. The fake Bob escapes prison and explains to the Simpsons that Bob forced him to switch faces, so he could be released with the other low-level criminals. Walt goes after Bart and arrives as Bob struggles to kill Bart. Walt and Bob fight until the police arrive. Guest Star: Kelsey Grammer.
464	23	"Judge Me Tender"	Steven Dean Moore	Dan Greaney & Allen Glazier	May 23, 2010	MABF15	5.75
Moe discovers his talent for judging in competitions and is invited to become a judge on the show American Idol. Simon Cowell tells Moe that he has become unlikable at home and advises him to be kinder. When he is nice to the contestants, he becomes unpopular. He discovers that Cowell tricked him, and he is removed from the show. Meanwhile, with Moe’s bar closed, Homer drives Marge crazy because he starts spending too much time at home, so she advises he take up golf as a hobby. When she learns that people who golf become addicted, she stops him. Guest Stars: Simon Cowell, Randy Jackson, Ellen DeGeneres, Kara DioGuardi, Ryan Seacrest and Rupert Murdoch.

Note: The Simpsons 20th Anniversary Special – In 3-D! On Ice!, which aired immediately following "Once Upon a Time in Springfield", was assigned production number LABF21 and technically counts as a component of the 20th production season (and of the 21st broadcast season). It does not, however, count towards the series' official animated episode count (i.e., it is not episode 452).

== Production ==
This season and the previous season were ordered in February 2009. Al Jean remained as showrunner, a role he had since the thirteenth season. The season featured eight holdover episodes from season 20’s LABF production line. John Frink was credited as an executive producer for the first time. It also featured fifteen episodes from the season’s MABF production line.

The season premiered with an episode written by guest writers Seth Rogen and Evan Goldberg. It also featured the final episode written by Daniel Chun before he left to join the American version of the television series The Office.

=== 20th anniversary ===
In 2009, to celebrate the 20th anniversary of the premiere of The Simpsons, Fox announced that a year-long celebration of the show titled "Best. 20 Years. Ever." would run from January 14, 2009 to January 14, 2010.

As part of the celebration, documentary filmmaker Morgan Spurlock directed and produced The Simpsons 20th Anniversary Special – In 3-D! On Ice!, a documentary special that examined the "cultural phenomenon of The Simpsons". Despite the title, Spurlock said the special "most likely [would] not be in 3-D nor on ice." Production began at Comic-Con 2009, and the show aired on January 10, 2010 on Fox. It included interviews with the cast and fans of the show.

For the week of November 9, 2009, several Fox shows including House, Lie to Me, Bones and Fringe featured clues and homages to the show as part of an "on-air scavenger hunt". Viewers who spotted the clues could win prizes at Fox.com. Marge also appeared on the cover of the November issue of Playboy.

The milestone was also celebrated in the United Kingdom with three special programmes, all twenty minutes long and entitled The Simpsons: Access All Areas, Simpsons...Mischief and Mayhem and Simpsons...Celebrity Friends respectively. They aired on Sky1 and Sky1 HD on three separate evenings from January 11 to 13, 2010. They were followed by the UK premiere of season 21's first episode, "Homer the Whopper".

== Reception ==
=== Critical reception ===
Robert Canning of IGN gave the season an 8.3 (improving 0.4 from the previous season) saying that it was "Impressive". He criticized the opening part of the season (other than "Homer the Whopper" and "Treehouse of Horror XX"), but praised almost every episode after "Once Upon a Time in Springfield", and considered "The Squirt and the Whale" and "The Bob Next Door" to be the season's best episodes. He also stated "the improved consistency of memorable episodes this season over years past proved that, even after 20 years, The Simpsons can still entertain".

TV Fanatic called the season "great" while reviewing "Judge Me Tender", while Emily St. James of The A.V. Club, while reviewing the same episode, stated "I think it's picked back up in the last few seasons and particularly in this season, which has had a lot of fun episodes in it."

"The Squirt and the Whale" was also praised for its chalkboard gag, which made a reference to the controversial South Park episodes "200" and "201", while "To Surveil with Love" was considered the "best episode in years" by Sharon Knolle of TV Squad and "one of the better outings" by Ariel Ponywether of FireFox News.

=== Ratings ===
In the seasonal Nielsen ratings in the 18-49 demographic, the season ranked joint 33rd with a 3.4/9 average. It also ranked 61st in the seasonal total viewers with an average of 7.208 million viewers.

The most viewed and highest rated episode of the season was "Once Upon a Time in Springfield", watched by an estimated 14.62 million households and with a Nielsen rating of 6.9/17 in the 18-49 demographic. The following episode, "Million Dollar Maybe", was the least viewed and lowest rated, watched by an estimated 5.110 million households and receiving a Nielsen rating of 2.4/6 in the 18-49 demographic, although this was largely down to the fact that it aired against the 2010 Grammy Awards on CBS and the 2010 Pro Bowl on ESPN.

=== Awards ===
Anne Hathaway won the Emmy Award for Outstanding Voice-Over Performance for voicing Princess Penelope in "Once Upon a Time in Springfield", while Dan Castellaneta and Hank Azaria were also nominated for "Thursdays with Abie" and "Moe Letter Blues" respectively. "Treehouse of Horror XX" won for Writing in a Television Production at the Annie Awards. "Once Upon a Time in Springfield" also received an Emmy nomination for Outstanding Animated Program, while The Simpsons 20th Anniversary Special - In 3-D! On Ice! was nominated for Outstanding Nonfiction Special. The show was also once again nominated for Favorite Cartoon at the 2010 Kids' Choice Awards. The season was also nominated for three awards at the 2010 Writers Guild of America Awards. Stephanie Gills was nominated for writing "Moe Letter Blues", and Matt Selman was nominated for "O Brother, Where Bart Thou?". The Simpsons 20th Anniversary Special — In 3-D! On Ice! was also nominated for Comedy/Variety – Music, Awards, Tributes – Specials.
