= Moe Letter Blues =

- The Simpsons episode
- Episode no.: Season 21; Episode 21
- Directed by: Matthew Nastuk
- Written by: Stephanie Gillis
- Production code: MABF13
- Original air date: May 9, 2010

Guest appearance
- Don Pardo as himself

Episode features
- Chalkboard gag: "Eating my vegetables is not a Mother's Day present"
- Couch gag: The family is a model constructed and subsequently destroyed by Nelson Muntz.

Episode chronology
← Previous "To Surveil with Love"	Next → "The Bob Next Door"
- The Simpsons season 21

"Moe Letter Blues" is the twenty-first episode of the twenty-first season of the American animated television series The Simpsons. It originally aired on the Fox network in the United States on May 9, 2010. In this episode, Homer, Reverend Lovejoy, and Apu Nahasapeemapetilon receive a letter from Moe stating that he will steal one of their wives. The three get together and try to remember intimate moments between Moe and their wives.

The episode was written by Stephanie Gillis and directed by Matthew Nastuk and guest stars Don Pardo as himself. The main plot of the episode is a parody of A Letter to Three Wives. It is the third episode after season 19's "Mona Leaves-a" and season 20's "Four Great Women and a Manicure" to air on Mother's Day and be centered on mothers and women.

"Moe Letter Blues" received positive reviews from critics and was viewed by 5.66 million households according to the Nielsen Media Research.

== Plot ==
Moe notices tension in the marriages of Homer, Apu, and Reverend Lovejoy. Mother's Day is approaching, and Marge, needing a break, suggests Homer take the children to Weasel Island after Krusty promotes it. Homer is enthusiastic but becomes concerned when Marge mentions his leaving will allow her to take care of an errand. As the ferry to the island departs, the three men receive a letter from Moe saying he is running off with one of their wives.

At Weasel Island, Homer, Apu and Lovejoy agonize over their situation. Each insists their marriage is fine. Homer, however, remembers his mother-in-law's 80th birthday, where Moe was the bartender. Homer, who was angry at Marge for only serving non-alcoholic beer, got into an argument with Patty and Selma. Disgusted, Homer drove them out, and Marge told him that he ruins every event she plans. Apu notices cracks in his marriage, recollecting an incident where he and Manjula forgot their son at Moe's after using the bar's bathroom. Manjula went to retrieve their son and did not return for hours. Homer recalls seeing Manjula playing a video game with Moe that night. Lovejoy remembers advice given to him that he ignored his wife Helen's needs, and Apu recounts how he witnessed Moe confiding in Helen that he was in love with a married woman.

When the ferry returns to the mainland, they realize they are equally likely to have lost their wives to Moe. At home, Homer thinks Marge is packing a suitcase and tries to convince her to stay. He realizes that she has painted a portrait of her mother. Jacqueline assures Homer that he was not responsible for the birthday incident. She admits that it was Patty and Selma's fault. When Lovejoy arrives home, he too thinks Helen is leaving, but she surprises him with tickets to Istanbul on board the Orient Express. Apu arrives home to find Moe sitting with Manjula, but she tells Apu that he convinced her to salvage their marriage.

Moe reveals he saw how troubling the relationships were, so he organized Marge's portrait, the Lovejoys' trip, and the Nahasapeemapetilons' marriage rescue. He wrote the letter to teach the men a lesson about taking their wives for granted, saying that they need to value them more. Upon learning this, Homer thanks Moe. In the end, Moe implores viewers to value their wives and mothers this Mother's Day.

== Cultural references ==
"Moe Letter Blues" served as a parody of the feature film, A Letter to Three Wives. Moe, while narrating the episode, makes a reference to SNL announcer Don Pardo (who then appears in the narration). The title of the episode is a reference to the film Mo' Better Blues, the second one after "Moe Baby Blues," as well as the blues song "Death Letter Blues."

The Itchy and Scratchy cartoon in the episode is a reference to the black and white French film A Trip to the Moon, and includes the song "Maple Leaf Rag" by ragtime composer Scott Joplin.

Moe's voice-over claims he moved to Springfield because the zip code spelled "BOOBS" on a calculator, which would make it "80085," a zip code that, according to the US postal service, is not assigned to any existing town. The music played during the interactive dance video session was Lady Gaga's "Just Dance." The song played during the Wagon scene is "O Mere Sona Re," a Bollywood song written by R.D. Burman and performed by Asha Bhosle, from the 1966 Hindi film soundtrack Teesri Manzil. When Rev. Lovejoy's spiritual adviser sang a song, he mentioned 'Krakatoa, East of Java'.

Otto's state of hallucination makes him see, during the drive from Weasel Island back to Springfield, characters from the Disney Pixar animated film Cars. Apu and Manjula's minivan has an upside down Volkswagen logo. It also bears strong resemblance to the Volkswagen T25. Shortly after the beginning of the episode, Moe advertises his bar by stating that "everybody comes to Moe's," which mirrors the introduction of Rick's Café in Casablanca.

== Reception ==
=== Viewing figures ===
In its original American broadcast, "Moe Letter Blues" was viewed by an estimated 5.660 million households, received a 2.7 rating/9 share in the 18-49 demographic tying with last week, coming second in its time slot losing to the season finale of The Amazing Race and becoming the third highest rated show on "Animation Domination."

=== Critical response ===
The episode received mainly positive reviews.

TV Fanatic gave the episode 3.5/5 and stated "The flashbacks definitely had some hilarious moments including a thousand devils d'ohing on Homer's shoulder. Moe was fantastic as a narrator and even better when he took advantage of his omniscient point of view."

Robert Canning of IGN gave the episode 8.4/10 and remarked "One issue I did have with the episode was Moe's, 'I'm leaving town forever and taking one of your wives' statement in his letter. You know there's no way Moe would ever be leaving the series or running off with any of these women, so the claim never held any drama. It might have worked better if Moe had simply said he was going to sleep with one of the women. This would have been a little more believable in the realm of the series and certainly would have been more in line with Moe's character. That aside, however, the storytelling and humor delivered yet another great episode."

Sharon Knolle of TV Squad said that "The Mother's Day-themed Simpsons episode can't compare to last week's — one of the best in years — but it was a pleasant enough outing," he also said Apu had some of the best lines in the episode.

Emily VanDerWerff of The A.V. Club gave the episode a B, stating that "the core of the episode is solid, and Moe makes a very funny narrator."

=== Awards and nominations ===
Hank Azaria was nominated for Primetime Emmy Award for Outstanding Voice-Over Performance at the 62nd Primetime Creative Arts Emmy Awards for voicing Apu Nahasapeemapetilon and Moe Szyslak in the episode.

Additionally, Stephanie Gillis was nominated for a Writers Guild of America Award for Outstanding Writing in Animation at the 63rd Writers Guild of America Awards for her script to this episode.
