= Postcards from the Wedge =

- The Simpsons episode
- Episode no.: Season 21; Episode 14
- Directed by: Mark Kirkland
- Written by: Brian Kelley
- Production code: MABF04
- Original air date: March 14, 2010

Guest appearance
- Marcia Wallace as Edna Krabappel

Episode features
- Couch gag: Repeat of the couch gag from "Gone Maggie Gone."

Episode chronology
← Previous "The Color Yellow"	Next → "Stealing First Base"
- The Simpsons season 21

"Postcards from the Wedge" is the fourteenth episode of the twenty-first season of the American animated television series The Simpsons. It originally aired on the Fox network in the United States on March 14, 2010. In the episode, Homer and Marge once again try to discipline Bart after Edna Krabappel tells them that Bart has not been doing his homework, but Bart has a plan to manipulate Homer's strictness and Marge's sympathetic ear, which backfires when Homer and Marge see through the plan and decide to ignore Bart.

The episode was written by Brian Kelley and directed by Mark Kirkland. The episode features references to the shows Pokémon, House and The Jetsons.

The episode received mostly positive reviews and got an 18-49 Nielsen Rating of 2.6/8.

Part of the episode was edited into The Simpsons 4D alongside The Longest Daycare

== Plot ==
At Springfield Elementary, after Edna Krabappel shows a video from 1956 to her students about the future, she tells her students to turn in their homework project, which they had three months to do. Bart, who had forgotten, tries to make his homework on the fly out of odds and ends found in his desk. A disapproving Edna sends a letter to Homer and Marge informing them Bart is a month behind on his homework. When Homer is informed that he does not have to help Bart with this work; he is eager to increase his son's workload, but Marge is concerned that the heavy workload will dissuade Bart from liking school, unaware that he already hates it. With his parents not agreeing on this issue, Bart uses their opposing views to avoid homework entirely, creating a wedge issue that sharply divides them both. As the arguments continue, Bart even incites them to argue about very minor things that do not even involve his homework. However, when Lisa sees what Bart has done, she calls him out for his behavior.

Marge seeks advice from Ned Flanders, who recalls having a minor argument with Maude on the day she died which still haunts him. Marge also seeks counsel from Patty and Selma, who, eager to break up Marge and Homer, encourage her to "stick to her guns" so she will be happier without Homer. However, aware of how her sisters feel about Homer, Marge contemplates how her life could mirror theirs and quickly sets out to make things right with her husband. Meanwhile, Homer falls asleep at work, dreams about accidentally killing Marge and realizes that he too wants to apologize. The two spot each other in traffic, rush out of their cars and embrace. They then decide to let Bart fend for himself, leaving him stunned when they pay no attention to any of his antics. When Bart confesses to Nelson he no longer feels thrilled when he plays pranks, Nelson suggests Bart receives no gratification from pranks unless someone loses their temper.

Bart then decides to destroy Springfield Elementary, which has recently been damaged by a subway tremor he and Milhouse caused on the town via the subway tracks, by driving a train under it. Homer and Marge find a note from Lisa informing them of this prank, and they decide to take immediate action. They rush to the subway station, where Homer tries to push the emergency kill switch. It is stuck, but Homer then imagines that the switch is Bart, pretends to be strangling him, and he succeeds in stopping the subway. Skinner is relieved when he realizes the school is saved, and he puts a flag up. However, the flagpole falls against the already damaged building, causing it to collapse, much to Nelson and Edna's delight. Bart is therefore grounded for a week and forced to finish his homework and tweet Homer about his current activities, and his parents begin to keep their son in line again. Eventually, Lisa finds out that Bart wrote the note himself and planned to be caught in order to get their parents' attention back, as he misspelled the word "Elementary" in the note. However, seeing that Bart learned his lesson, Lisa happily agrees to keep it a secret, much to Bart's relief.

== Cultural references ==
The opening cartoon is in the style of the animated television series The Jetsons. The Itchy & Scratchy Show cartoon is a parody of the Fox television series House. And Bart is seen watching an episode of the Pokémon Anime.

== Reception ==
=== Ratings ===
In the original American broadcast, "Postcards from the Wedge" was viewed by 5.23 million viewers and got an 18-49 Nielsen rating of 2.6/8 coming second in its timeslot after The Amazing Race making it the third most viewed show on Fox that night after a new episode of Family Guy and a rerun of "The Great Wife Hope," but the second highest rated show on FOX that night after Family Guy."

=== Critical reception ===
The episode received positive reviews.

Robert Canning of IGN gave the episode an 8, stating the episode was "outstanding" and that "Again, the story was nothing entirely new, but the jokes were smart and fun and worth sitting on the couch for a half-hour."

Ariel Ponywether of Firefox News gave the episode a B− and said that "There were some very solid moments in this episode, with some surprisingly subversive humor throughout, and the final scene was a real winner. The middle stretch slows down the episode’s pacing a bit."

Emily VanDerWerff of The A.V. Club gave the episode a B and stated "I don't think the plotting here was as tight as it might have been – lots of threads were introduced and then mostly left dangling, and the end was particularly abrupt – but I laughed fairly frequently, and that will be enough."

Jason Hughes of TV Squad said that "All in all, while it was an unexpectedly serious episode, it was a pleasant enough one as well. No big guffaws, but enough smiles to go around."

=== Awards and nominations ===
Animator Charles Ragins won the Primetime Emmy Award for Outstanding Individual Achievement in Animation at the 62nd Primetime Creative Arts Emmy Awards for Background Design for this episode.
