= Homer the Whopper =

- The Simpsons episode
- Promotional image featuring Homer as Everyman and Lyle McCarthy
- Episode no.: Season 21; Episode 1
- Directed by: Lance Kramer
- Written by: Seth Rogen; Evan Goldberg
- Production code: LABF13
- Original air date: September 27, 2009

Guest appearances
- Seth Rogen as Lyle McCarthy; Matt Groening as himself; Kevin Michael Richardson as the security guard

Episode features
- Chalkboard gag: "The class hamster isn't just sleeping"
- Couch gag: The Simpsons arrive at a subway station, where the subway doors open to reveal their living room.
- Commentary: Matt Groening; Al Jean

Episode chronology
← Previous "Coming to Homerica"	Next → "Bart Gets a 'Z'"
- The Simpsons season 21

"Homer the Whopper" is the twenty-first season premiere of the American animated television series The Simpsons. It originally aired on the Fox network in the United States on September 27, 2009.

In the first episode of season 21, Comic Book Guy creates a new superhero, Everyman, who takes powers from other superheroes. Homer is cast as the lead in the film adaptation. To get Homer into shape, the movie studio hires a celebrity fitness trainer, Lyle McCarthy, to help him. Homer gets into great shape and is really excited, but when McCarthy leaves to train another client, he starts over-eating again and ultimately this leads to the film's failure.

This episode was written by Seth Rogen and Evan Goldberg, who are "obsessed" fans of the show, and directed by Lance Kramer. "Homer the Whopper" was intended to be a commentary on how Hollywood treats superhero films. Rogen also guest stars in the episode as the character Lyle McCarthy, making him the second guest star to both write an episode and appear in it; Ricky Gervais was the first. Matt Groening even appeared as himself in this episode.

"Homer the Whopper" has received mixed reviews from television critics and acquired a Nielsen rating of 4.3 in its original broadcast.

== Plot ==
Bart and Milhouse persuade Comic Book Guy to publish Everyman, a comic he has created and written in which the titular hero can absorb the superpowers of any character whose comic book he touches. It becomes an instant hit, and many Hollywood studios become interested in making it into a film. Comic Book Guy signs a movie deal, on the condition that he gets to choose the star. He considers Homer to be perfect for the role, as he envisions Everyman as a middle-aged fat man. However, the studio executives hire fitness trainer Lyle McCarthy to get Homer into shape, knowing that audiences prefer to see physically fit actors in superhero roles.

One month later, Homer has become fit under Lyle's training regimen and the film begins production. Lyle soon leaves Homer to begin working with a different client, though, and Homer reverts to his old habits of laziness and overeating and quickly regains all the weight he lost. The film begins to go over budget, and Comic Book Guy and the executives fear that it will not be successful. The final version includes shots of Homer in both his fit and overweight states, confusing the audience and ruining their enjoyment. Although the premiere is a disaster, the executives offer to let Comic Book Guy direct a sequel as long as he gives the film a good review. Comic Book Guy is pleased at first, but soon changes his mind and posts a scathing online review. The film becomes a box office bomb, and a law is passed to prevent any future film adaptations of Everyman from being made.

== Production ==
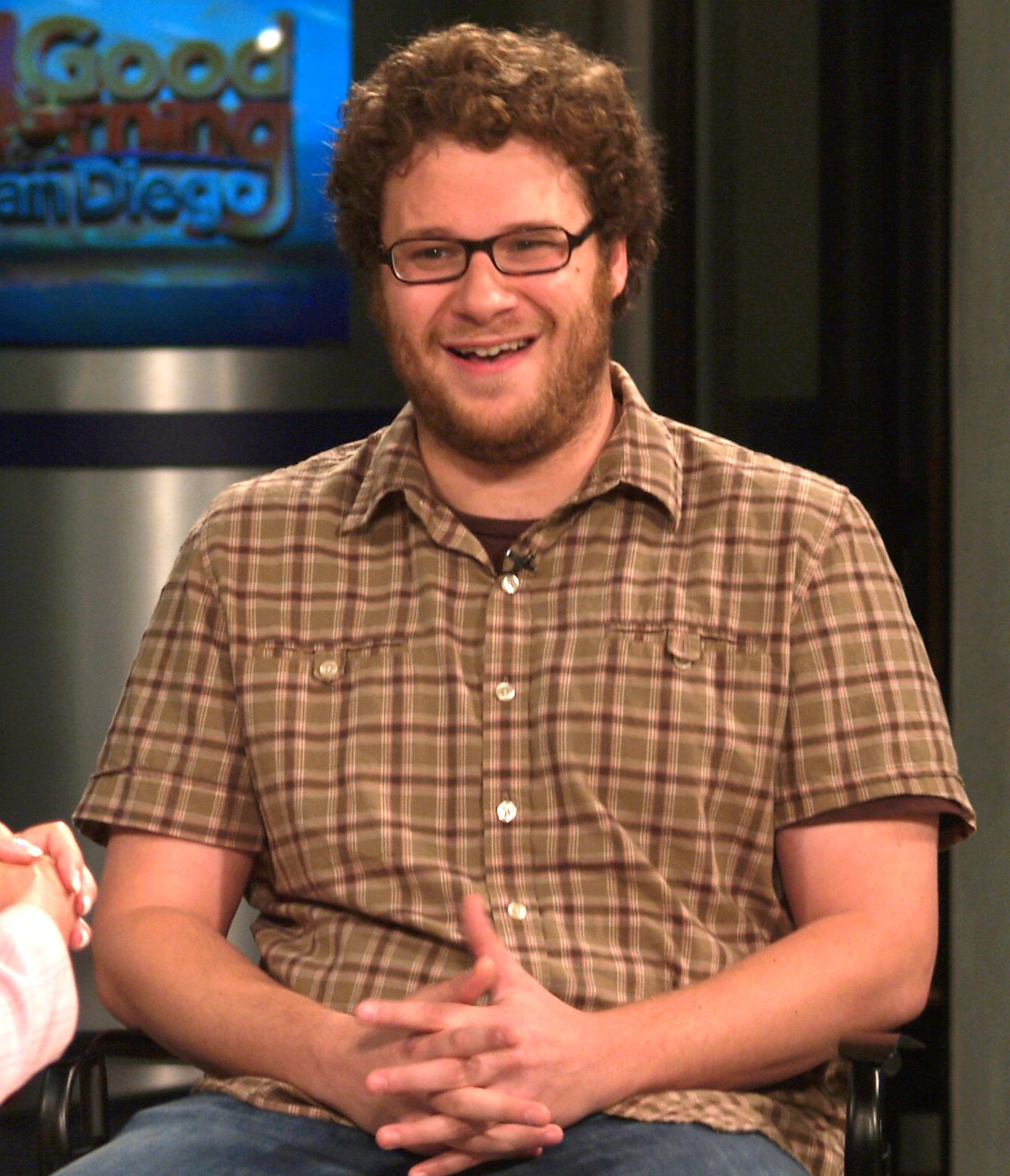
Seth Rogen co-wrote the episode and guest starred as the character Lyle McCarthy

Seth Rogen and Evan Goldberg, writers of the film Superbad, are "obsessed" fans of The Simpsons. After learning that The Simpsons executive producer James L. Brooks was a fan of Superbad, they decided to ask the producers of the show if they could write an episode. In 2006, Ricky Gervais, co-creator of The Office, received credit for writing the season 17 episode "Homer Simpson, This Is Your Wife". Rogen and Goldberg "thought if [Gervais] got to write one, maybe [they] could try." They were invited to The Simpsons writers room, where they pitched several episode ideas. One was accepted, and they wrote an outline with the help of some feedback from the regular writers.

Rogen commented that he and Goldberg wanted to show with the episode how Hollywood generally ruins superhero films. He said that "the whole joke is that Homer is cast to play a guy who's an everyman and they try to make him into this physically fit guy." Rogen also noted that the plot mirrors the situation he was in while working on the film The Green Hornet, when he had to lose weight and do physical training for his role. Show runner Al Jean commented that the writers tried not to repeat the comic book film theme from the "Radioactive Man" episode. Instead they decided to parody the fact that almost every comic book has been turned into a film. Jean commented that that scene in the episode in which the studio executives "are trying to think up an idea that hasn't been done really is what they are doing these days [in real life]."

The table read took place in August 2008, and production on the episode began soon after that. Rogen later said that "we sat down for a read-through and three hours later I'm in a studio improv-ing with Homer Simpson, it was the single greatest day of my life." Rogen also voiced the character of Lyle McCarthy, making him the second guest star after Gervais to both write an episode and appear in it. The Simpsons creator Matt Groening also makes an appearance in the episode.

== Reception ==
In its original American broadcast in the United States on September 27, 2009, "Homer the Whopper" was watched in 8.31 million homes and acquired a 4.3 Nielsen rating/12 share.

Since airing, "Homer the Whopper" has received mixed to positive reviews from television critics.

Steve Fritz of Newsarama called the episode "amazing" and commented that the "overall comic book theme was perfect."

Reviewers for TV Guide cited Matt Groening's cameo, the dinner table scene, Homer trying to lose weight at the Kwik-E-Mart, and the opening scene where Bart questions Comic Book Guy about Spider-Man as the highlights of the episode.

Robert Canning of IGN was positive about "Homer the Whopper", giving it an 8.6/10 rating. He commented that the first act of the episode was the strongest, while the others were weaker. Canning believed the reason for this was that the viewers have already seen Homer "struggle with his weight countless times, and Rogen's trainer, though funny much of the time, will likely never be remembered as a classic guest role." He added, however, that Rogen and Goldberg are able to find "a few new angles with the weight jokes, so it's not a complete loss." Overall, Canning thought "Homer the Whopper" was a good start to the twenty-first season, and although the plot may not be very original, the writers added "freshness to the proceedings."

The A.V. Club's Emily VanDerWerff did not think the script was as good as Gervais', but commented that Rogen and Goldberg "managed to make a mostly amusing season premiere." She added that she thought the Hollywood satirizing featured in this episode had been overused on the show, but "the specificity of what the [episode] was making fun of—trainers who help stars slim down (in this case, helping Homer slim down)—went a long way toward making the episode palatable." VanDerWerff concluded that while the episode "didn't try anything new [...], [she] had fun with it all the same, ultimately giving the episode a B."
