= Rednecks and Broomsticks =

- The Simpsons episode
- Episode no.: Season 21; Episode 7
- Directed by: Bob Anderson & Rob Oliver
- Written by: Kevin Curran
- Production code: LABF19
- Original air date: November 29, 2009

Guest appearance
- Neve Campbell as Cassandra

Episode features
- Chalkboard gag: "Teachers' unions are not ruining this country"
- Couch gag: The Simpson family gathers around the dinner table for a Thanksgiving meal, but soon gather their plates and head for the couch where they watch a football game on TV.

Episode chronology
← Previous "Pranks and Greens"	Next → "O Brother, Where Bart Thou?"
- The Simpsons season 21

"Rednecks and Broomsticks" is the seventh episode in the twenty-first season of the American animated television series The Simpsons. It originally aired on the Fox network in the United States on November 29, 2009. In the episode, Lisa befriends three teenaged Wiccans after getting lost in the woods during a game of hide-and-seek, and must clear her new friends' names when they are accused of cursing the townspeople with their supposed witchcraft. Meanwhile, Homer befriends Cletus after learning that he and his friends make their own moonshine.

The episode was written by Kevin Curran, and directed by Bob Anderson and Rob Oliver.

In its original airing, the episode had an estimated 9 million viewers and received a Nielsen rating of 4.2/10.

The episode also received generally positive reviews from critics.

== Plot ==
The Simpson family becomes helplessly stuck in traffic while returning from a ski vacation. To pass the time, Bart, Lisa and Maggie spend hours playing the repetitive and noisy game "Bonk-It", much to Marge and Homer's annoyance.

Homer loses his patience and throws the toy out the window, where it is crushed by passing vehicles. By a twist of fate, another father throws his children's Bonk-It out of a car window, and it lands in the hands of the Simpson children. Eventually the batteries run out, but Bart plugs the toy into the car's cigarette lighter, causing it to play even faster. His patience long gone, Homer smashes the Bonk-It with his foot, but it becomes lodged under the brake pedal. He loses control of the vehicle, accidentally hits a deer reminiscent of Bambi and ends up on a frozen lake, where a mysterious person drags them out.

When the family wakes up, they discover that the mysterious person who saved them was Cletus. Cletus tells Homer about moonshine, and invites him to taste the latest batch. Homer impresses Cletus and his hillbilly friends with his moonshine-tasting skills and is invited to be the judge of a moonshine competition.

Meanwhile, Bart and Cletus's sons play with a box of grenades that Cletus's wife Brandine, a former soldier, had brought back from Iraq, and Lisa plays hide and seek with Cletus's daughters. They do not find her, and Lisa gets lost in the woods.

Trying to find her way back, Lisa encounters three girls who are Wiccans, practicing their full moon Esbat. Lisa is initially skeptical of their ability to cast spells, but becomes interested after she happens to mention in the witches' Circle that she wishes she did not have to hand in her unfinished art project, and her wish comes true when Miss Hoover is taken ill with a stomach virus. The girls ask Lisa to join their coven and she accepts. But Ned Flanders learns of Lisa's plans and tips off Chief Wiggum. On the night of Lisa's induction, Chief Wiggum turns up and arrests the three girls on suspicion of witchcraft.

Outside the courtroom, the girls say a chant, asking their goddess to 'show their persecutors that they are blind'. Many of the townspeople then suddenly become blind, and blame the three girls, who are then put on trial. When the judge dismisses the case, the townspeople decide to take the law into their own hands, and wish to drown the girls in an impromptu witch trial.

Lisa, however, proves that the real culprits behind the town's temporary blindness are Homer and his hillbilly friends, who threw their moonshine stills into a river leading to the town's reservoir after thinking that they were about to be arrested by the police sent out by Flanders; the combination of alcohols caused the temporary blindness in the townspeople and animals who swam in or drank the water. The girls are released, and Homer entertains himself by using the witch-dunking chair to binge drink the moonshine water, but falls off the chair into the river.

The episode ends with Lisa ice-skating on the frozen river to the song "Season of the Witch" while her skates carve a hole in the ice that frees Homer.

== Production ==
The episode was written by Kevin Curran and directed by Bob Anderson and Rob Oliver.

In August 2009, Fox announced that Neve Campbell would guest star as Cassandra, a Wiccan whom the townsfolk accuse of blinding them.

== Cultural references ==
The title refers to the 1971 Disney film Bedknobs and Broomsticks. Guest star Neve Campbell is famous for starring in The Craft, a film with a similar theme to this episode. The way Cletus takes the family out of the frozen lake is similar to Deliverance and Misery. The sequence with Homer and Cletus exploring different moonshine locales, split into four different screens, is a parody of Sideways. Lisa is shown doing online research using a site called Wiccapedia. The last scene in the episode of Lisa figure skating on the frozen water is also reminiscent of the final scene in the film To Die For. One scene features a group of bears chained up wearing clothes, referred to as The Country Bear Jamboree.

== Reception ==
In its original American broadcast, "Rednecks and Broomsticks" was viewed by an estimated 9.02 million households and received a 4.2 Nielsen rating/10 share in the 18–49 demographic. It was the most-watched show out of the four shows on Fox's Animation Domination line-up, but the second highest rated show of Animation Domination after Family Guy. The show was also the fourth most watched show on Fox that week after House, The OT, and Bones while being fourth in the Adults 18–49 viewing for the week after House, The OT, and Family Guy.

Robert Canning of IGN stated in his review "In the end, for all the small bits that worked -- Moleman operating on himself, Moe and the angry mob -- 'Rednecks and Broomsticks' was just too bland to be worthwhile.".

Emily VanDerWerff of The A.V. Club gave the episode A− praising the Sideways parody saying that it "a.) arose naturally from the story and b.) was all about moonshine, which is never not funny."
