= The Squirt and the Whale =

- The Simpsons episode
- Episode no.: Season 21; Episode 19
- Directed by: Mark Kirkland
- Written by: Matt Warburton
- Production code: MABF14
- Original air date: April 25, 2010

Episode features
- Chalkboard gag: "South Park—we'd stand beside you if we weren't so scared". Some stations aired: "Je ne suis pas Français" ("I am not French")
- Couch gag: The family chases the couch throughout the pages of The Springfield Shopper. The couch reunites with them after seeing an advertisement about itself in the classifieds section.

Episode chronology
← Previous "Chief of Hearts"	Next → "To Surveil with Love"
- The Simpsons season 21

"The Squirt and the Whale" is the nineteenth episode of the twenty-first season of the American animated television series The Simpsons. The 460th episode of the series overall, it originally aired on the Fox network in the United States on April 25, 2010. In the episode, the Simpson family attempts to save a beached whale that washed up onshore, only for it to die.

The episode was written by Matt Warburton and directed by Mark Kirkland. The episode features references to William Shatner and fellow animated show South Park, and its controversy of the depiction of Muhammad in the then-two recent episodes "200" and "201".

"The Squirt and the Whale" received positive reviews from critics with IGN naming it and "The Bob Next Door" the best episodes of the season.

== Plot ==
When Homer is outraged by the family's high electricity bill, they attend an alternate energy expo and purchase a wind turbine. At first the turbine produces an excess of electricity which the electric company leeches, so Homer decides the family will live off the grid so the company can't use "their" electricity. They soon discover that they have no electricity when there is no wind. Homer tries to power the turbine with fans plugged into Ned Flanders' house, but Ned angrily disconnects them. One evening Bart is manually turning the turbine so Lisa can watch House, and when he prays for wind, a severe storm blows through town. The next morning Lisa and Bart bike through town to survey the damage and discover a beached blue whale.

Lisa immediately bonds with the blue whale and names her Bluella. She appeals to her parents for help returning Bluella to the sea, but Marge fears Lisa will be let down because the outcome for beached whales is usually poor. Still, Homer rallies the townspeople and they unsuccessfully attempt to move Bluella. As night falls, Lisa decides to stay with Bluella and starts reading her excerpts from the poem "The World Below the Brine" from the poetry collection Leaves of Grass by Walt Whitman. She dozes off and awakes to the Marines rescuing Bluella with helicopters. Bluella happily swims away but when she leaps into the northern lights (a reference to the animation of Respighi's Pines of Rome in Disney's Fantasia 2000), Lisa awakes, realizes she was dreaming and discovers Bluella has died from lack of water.

Homer tries to comfort a heartbroken Lisa, while Bart and Milhouse, who plan to poke Bluella with a stick, return to the beach and discover the police are going to blow up the whale carcass, as it cannot stay on the beach. The results are disastrous and blubber is everywhere, prompting the townspeople to use Bluella's remains for products such as corsets and perfume. Lisa sadly walks through town, where every squeaky noise reminds her of Bluella. She winds up at the beach, where she spots two whale calves — presumed to be Bluella's offspring — surrounded by sharks. Homer suddenly appears with a boat (which he had apparently offered to test drive) and a harpoon and they rush to the rescue, only to be stopped by two eco-activists, who caution Lisa that being an eco-activist means supporting all forms of life (including sharks but excluding cockroaches). Lisa agrees and stops Homer from shooting the sharks, but he inadvertently falls overboard. The eco-activists advise Homer to hit the sharks on the nose with a steel pail, which will either cause them to retreat or make the sharks devour Homer faster. When the eco-activists throw the pail to Homer, it strikes him in the head causing him to bleed and even more sharks arrive and circle Homer. Fortunately, the whale calves' father appears and rescues the young whales and Homer, driving the sharks away. In the end, the Simpson family watches the three whales swim out to sea, confident that they will thrive. Homer assumes that the whale will marry a "sexy lady octopus," and that a "little whale-upus is on the way!" Marge then suggests that they draw pictures of that tonight. Over the ending credits, the song "La Mer" plays while the pictures the Simpsons drew are shown.

== Production ==
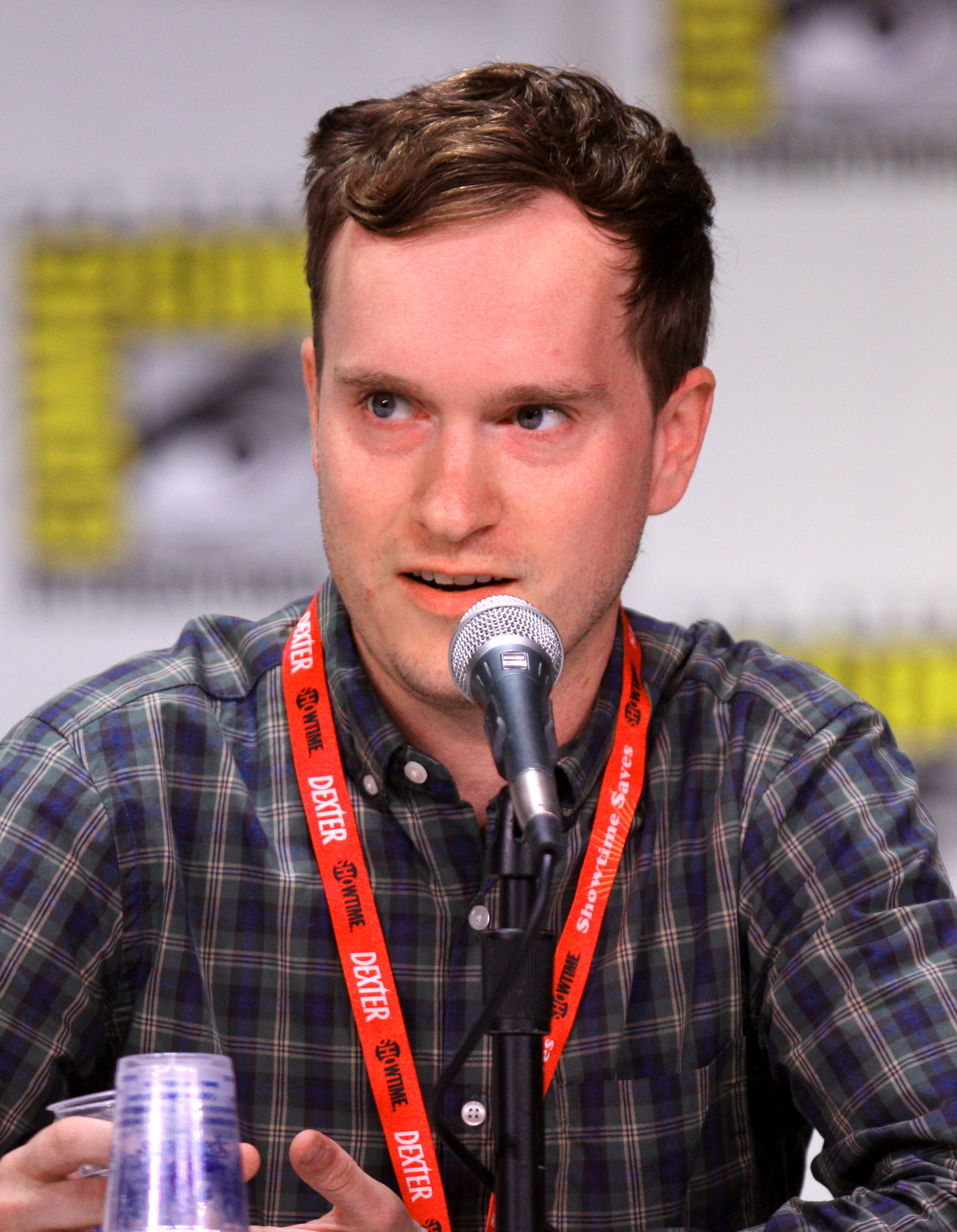
Matt Warburton wrote "The Squirt and the Whale."

The episode was written by Matt Warburton, his ninth writing credit for the series, and was directed by Mark Kirkland.

== Cultural references ==
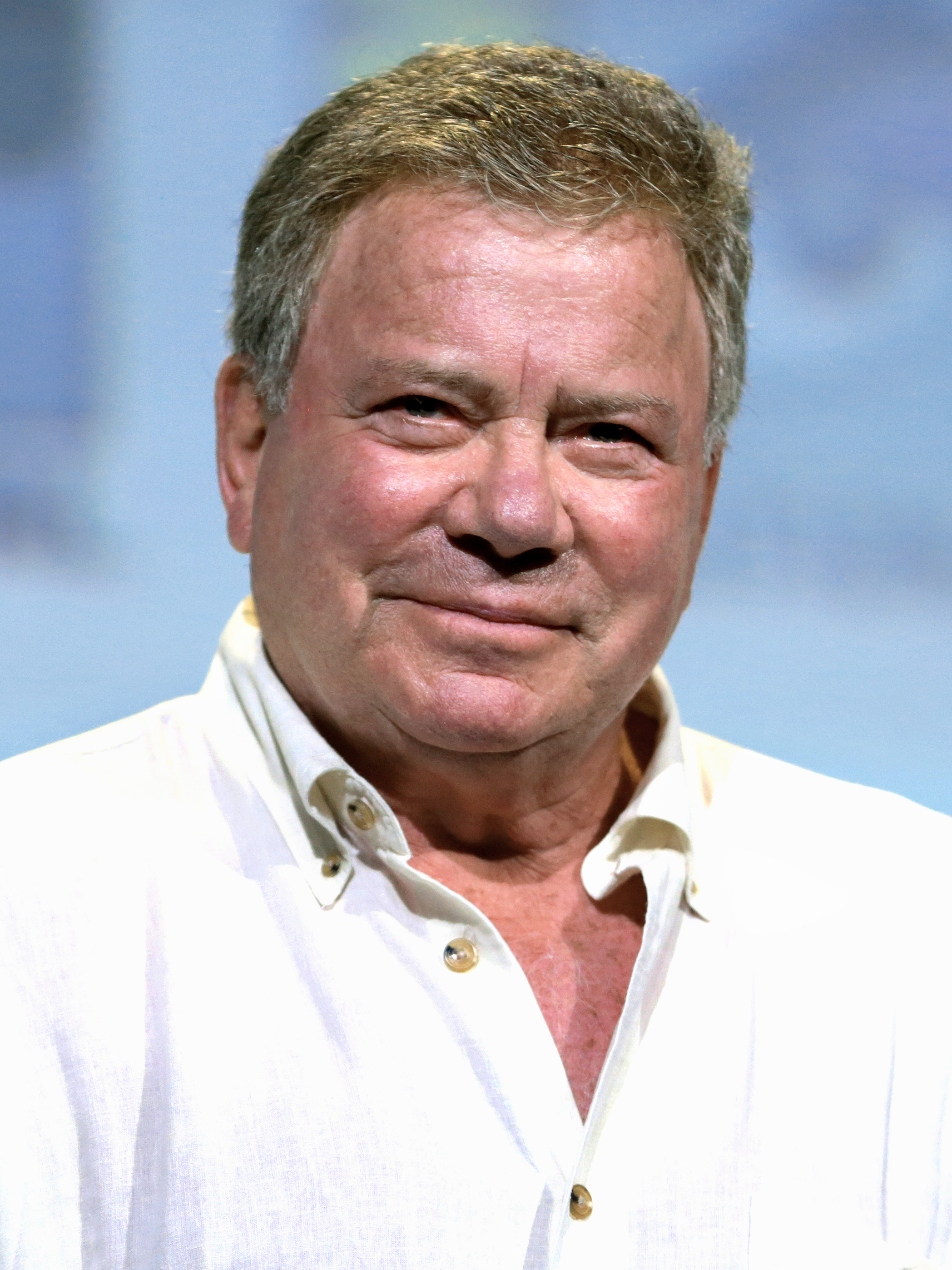
William Shatner's appearance in television and film over the years was referenced.

As aired on many stations, Bart's chalkboard gag is "South Park—We'd stand beside you if we weren't so scared", a reference to the controversy surrounding the South Park episodes "200" and "201". The episodes satirized the controversies surrounding depictions of the Muslim prophet Muhammad. This led to threats against South Park creators Trey Parker and Matt Stone, and the original broadcast of "201" on April 21, 2010, was heavily censored by Comedy Central before being banned outright. The episode also features references to actor William Shatner with Comic Book Guy wearing a corset and says he is Captain Kirk from Star Trek I then as the corset loosens he says he becomes Star Trek I, Star Trek II, Star Trek V, Star Trek Generations, and finally Boston Legal. Bart and Lisa play a tennis game on a console called the "Funtendo Zii", a parody of the Nintendo Wii. The title "The Squirt and the Whale" is a reference to the movie The Squid and the Whale. The explosion of the whale carcass and the following debris raining down on onlookers is a reference to the iconic 1970s failed removal of the Florence Whale carcass via explosion of TNT

== Reception ==
=== Viewing figures ===
In its original American broadcast, "The Squirt and the Whale" was viewed by an estimated 5.94 million households and received an 18-49 Nielsen rating demographic of 2.8 and a 8 share coming second in its timeslot and the second most viewed and rated show on "Animation Domination" after a Family Guy rerun.

=== Critical response ===
"The Squirt and the Whale" received positive reviews from critics with many praising the South Park chalkboard.

Robert Canning of IGN gave the episode 9.3/10 and remarked that the episode "was an absolute gem." He also stated "It was hilarious and heartwarming. In a time when many are saying the series has lost its magic, Sunday night's episode proved that even the old-timers can show you how it's done once in a while." He concluded that it was "the best episode of the season so far."

Emily VanDerWerff of The A.V. Club gave the episode a B. She stated, "I thought it was a really well done version of a story we've seen a number of times, where Lisa becomes involved with some sort of improbable cause, finds herself disappointed, and is only brought out of her bad mood when her family rallies around her" but also remarked that the episode "tried too hard to push for a happy ending."

Sharon Knolle of TV Squad gave the episode a positive review as well saying "Finally, a good -- maybe even great -- episode. 'The Squirt and the Whale' packed more laughs in the first few minutes' Alternative Energy Expo than the entire running time of most recent eps."

Eric Goldman of IGN described the opening chalkboard gag as "a humorous one, which used self-deprecation to say The Simpsons couldn't fully stand with South Park - yet clearly stating that the producers do indeed support them, by bringing up the issue at all."

Robert Canning of IGN in a review of the season named it one of the best episodes of the season tied with "The Bob Next Door."

=== Awards and nomination ===
The episode was nominated for the Annie Award for Best Animated Television Production at the 38th Annie Awards.
