= Pranks and Greens =

- The Simpsons episode
- Episode no.: Season 21; Episode 6
- Directed by: Chuck Sheetz
- Written by: Jeff Westbrook
- Production code: LABF18
- Original air date: November 22, 2009

Guest appearances
- Jonah Hill as Andy Hamilton; Marcia Wallace as Edna Krabappel

Episode features
- Chalkboard gag: "Halloween does not kick Thanksgiving's ass"
- Couch gag: The family (dressed as Christmas carolers) sings a parody of the last verse of The Twelve Days of Christmas, featuring many ancillary characters.

Episode chronology
← Previous "The Devil Wears Nada"	Next → "Rednecks and Broomsticks"
- The Simpsons season 21

"Pranks and Greens" is the sixth episode of the twenty-first season of the American animated television series The Simpsons. It originally aired on the Fox network in the United States on November 22, 2009. The episode was written by Jeff Westbrook and directed by Chuck Sheetz.

In this episode, Bart tracks down an immature, college-aged man named Andy Hamilton who was once hailed Springfield Elementary's best prankster and encourages him to do something with his life. Jonah Hill guest starred.

It was watched by approximately 7.03 million viewers during its original airing. The episode received positive reviews.

== Plot ==
After Bart is apprehended for playing pranks on the teachers of Springfield Elementary, Principal Skinner reveals to Bart that he is not the greatest prankster to ever walk the halls of the school. Bart is shocked by this revelation and sets out to discover the identity of this prankster. After sifting through countless back issues of the school paper, he discovers that there is a two-week gap in its publication dating back ten years, and that there is a substantial change in Skinner's demeanor and appearance before and after the gap. Groundskeeper Willie eventually tells Bart that he was once the school swim instructor, and that Skinner was once fun-loving and laid-back until an incident dubbed "Night of the Wigglers". Here, a prankster named Andy Hamilton locked Skinner in a pool full of earthworms for three days, changing Skinner's personality for the worse.

Bart meets Andy and discovers that he is unemployed and lives with his mother. When Lisa suggests Andy is a loser, Bart gets him a job as Krusty the Clown's assistant as a favor Krusty owes him, but is angry when Andy quits after one day. Bart gets him rehired and goes to check Andy's progress. When a truck full of earthworms labelled "Prank Grade" drives into the studio, Bart is terrified that Andy is repeating the "Night of the Wigglers" prank and that Krusty will end up a loser like Skinner. He discovers however that it is part of the show, and that Andy has been hired as a head writer for Krusty's show and has a girlfriend, much to Bart's delight. Despite Andy's success, Lisa still thinks that he is a loser, believing that writing for a comedy show is no better than the life of a prankster.

Meanwhile, Marge is harshly criticized by other Springfield mothers for serving unhealthy snacks at their "Midday Mommies" meeting. In response, she burns the family's junk food and the family purchases organic food, which is very expensive and has a short shelf life. At the next meeting, while the other mothers enjoy Marge's healthy food, they become horrified at Marge for using non-stick bakeware (which contains PFOAs) and having the babies drink out of plastic drinking bottles marked with number 7 (which has the potential to leak BPA). The other mothers storm away and get into a nearby ambulance, tossing out Hans Moleman in the process. Marge realizes that she misses eating junk food and Homer later catches Marge eating from his stash of candy, and the two of them have sex while indulging in junk food together, and then agree to only make the kids eat healthy.

== Production ==
This episode's table draft was completed on October 16, 2008. It was originally called "Ursa Major and Doofus Minor."

In August 2009, Fox announced that Jonah Hill would guest star as Andy, the best prankster ever at Springfield Elementary. Hill estimated that he had written 100 Simpsons scripts as a child. He sent letters with ideas to the show's writers but received no response. While recording, he was able to tour the writers' room.

== Reception ==
"Pranks and Greens" received generally positive reviews.

IGN's Robert Canning gave it a 6.9/10 saying that "the episode had a good start, but veered into a less than impressive direction and Marge's storyline, while cute in parts, was really just filler more than anything else".

Emily VanDerWerff of The A.V. Club gave it a B, stating, "Not a bad setup for an episode, particularly as Bart's shenanigans are one of the few things the show does consistently anymore, but it just never felt like the Andy and Bart story ever went anywhere".

Jason Hughes of AOL TV said, "This was a pretty well-structured episode, in that it might even give Bart some hope and direction for his own life...It adds something to the character of Bart to have an older prankster in town, whether he's successful or not."

The episode was viewed by 7.03 million viewers with a rating share of 3.3/8, making it the second most viewed episode on Animation Domination after Family Guy, making The Simpsons come in at 24th in the ratings for this week. A later rerun got 8.14 million and a rating of 4.8/8 more than the original airing and was 20th in the weekly ratings and 9th in the 18 and 49 rating making it the highest rated show on Fox.
