= Million Dollar Maybe =

- The Simpsons episode
- Promotional image for the episode, showing Homer and Bart watching Coldplay perform "Viva la Vida"
- Episode no.: Season 21; Episode 11
- Directed by: Chris Clements
- Written by: Bill Odenkirk
- Production code: MABF03
- Original air date: January 31, 2010

Guest appearances
- Chris Martin as himself; Marcia Wallace as Edna Krabappel

Episode features
- Couch gag: Homer runs to the couch first. He pulls out an iPhone, presses the "Couch Gag" app and downloads Bart, Lisa, Marge, and Maggie making them run to the couch in the app. Homer then gets an incoming call from Mr. Burns, he screams and swallows the phone.

Episode chronology
← Previous "Once Upon a Time in Springfield"	Next → "Boy Meets Curl"
- The Simpsons season 21

"Million Dollar Maybe" is the eleventh episode in the twenty-first season of the American animated television series The Simpsons. It first aired on the Fox network in the United States on January 31, 2010. In this episode, Homer wins $1 million in the lottery. Later fearing that Marge will discover that he missed a wedding reception while buying the winning ticket, Homer uses his windfall to buy the family anonymous gifts. Meanwhile, Lisa uses a Funtendo Zii to make life more interesting for Grampa Simpson and his friends at the retirement home.

"Million Dollar Maybe" was written by Bill Odenkirk and directed by Chris Clements. The episode was well received by most television critics, who praised its humor and storyline. Upon its initial airing, the episode attained 5.11 million viewers and garnered a 2.4 rating in the 18-49 demographic. "Million Dollar Maybe" featured a guest appearance from Chris Martin of Coldplay, as well as appearances from recurring voice actors and actresses for the series.

== Plot ==
Homer and Marge are scheduled to do a singing toast at Marge's cousin Valerie's wedding, causing Marge to become nervous, due to her fear of embarrassment. Homer tells her not to worry, saying that he will make sure they do not mess up. Homer gets a fortune cookie stating that today will be his lucky day, but he does not believe so. However, he starts to believe this occurs when he crashes into a vending machine causing all of the snacks to fall out on him, and finds an Emerson, Lake & Palmer CD in the parking lot. He sings along to "Lucky Man", driving recklessly to the synthesizer solo. He then goes to the Kwik-E-Mart for a lottery ticket, even though he's running late for the wedding. After a long wait, Homer gets his lottery ticket, only to find out the wedding has ended. When he takes his eyes off the road for a second, he crashes. Homer wakes up in the hospital, and realizes he won a million dollars in the lottery. Homer does not want Marge to know he missed the wedding to get a lottery ticket, and has Barney pose as the winner. So that Marge does not know he won the money, he secretly leaves gifts for his family members. When Bart discovers Homer's scheme, he threatens to tell Marge unless Homer publicly embarrasses himself. Eventually, Homer decides to tell Marge himself. Taking Marge on a hot-air balloon, he reveals he won the lottery, causing Marge to become very glad; he then tells her he spent it all, leaving them poor as usual. However, Marge does not care, saying at least they have each other. Homer then reveals he spent the last of the money on a giant cherry blossom grove in the shape of Marge's face with the words "Love of my Life". They then sing the song they were supposed to sing at the wedding together, off in the sunset.

In the sub-plot, Lisa discovers that the senior citizens at Grampa's nursing home do not have any entertainment, and goes to buy them a digital TV converter. However, while at the store, she discovers Mr. Burns playing Funtendo Zii Sports, appearing to have a good time. She decides to buy this for the senior citizens. When playing the Zii, the senior citizens seem happy and act younger. This forces the nurses at the home to work extra hard after their workout since the elders begin making outrageous demands, prompting them to destroy the machine. The senior citizens then return to their boring selves, staring at TV static.

== Production ==
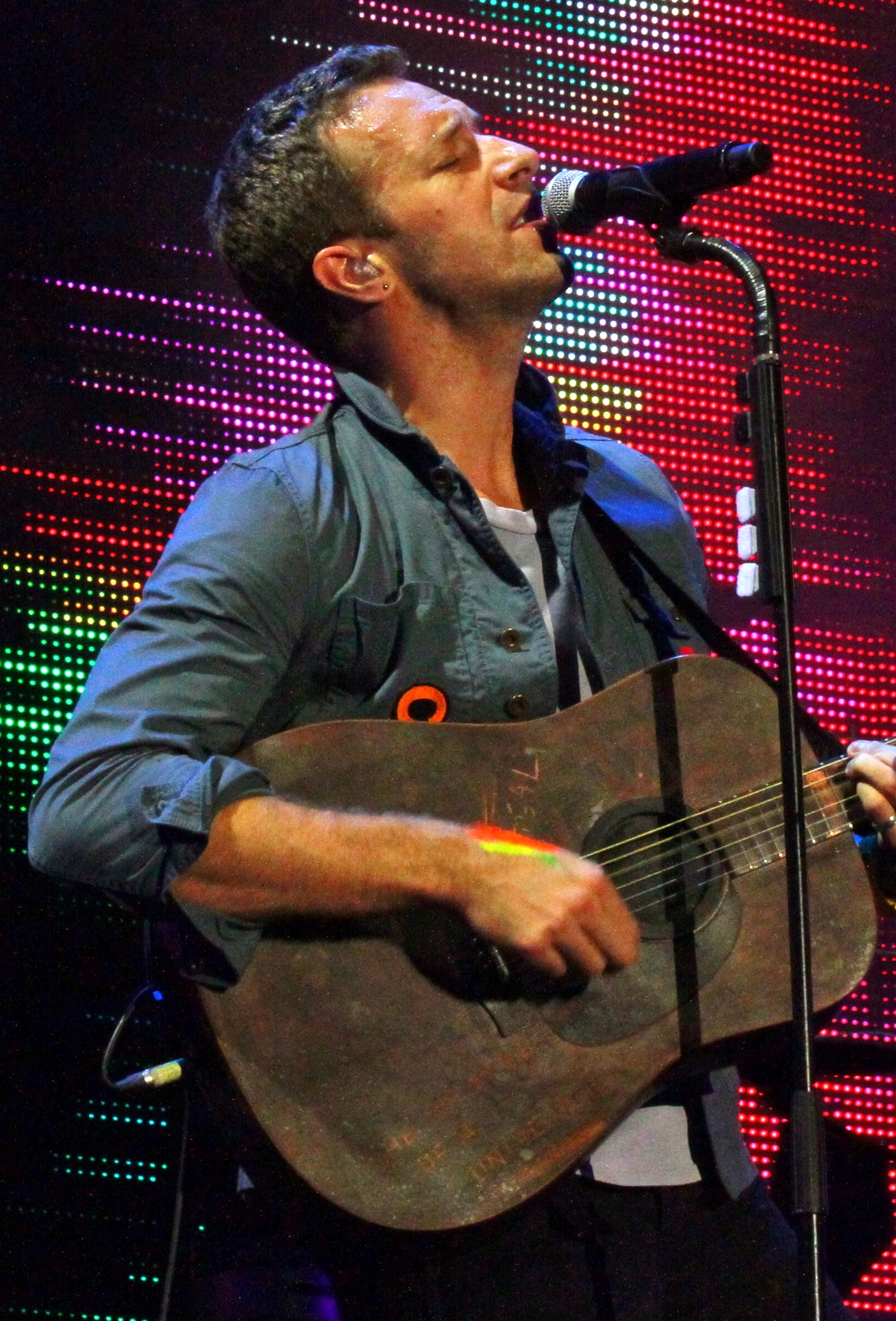
Chris Martin of Coldplay guest starred as himself in the episode.

"Million Dollar Maybe" was written by Bill Odenkirk and directed by Chris Clements. In July 2009, it was announced that singer Chris Martin of the band Coldplay would guest star as himself in the episode. In an interview with Entertainment Weekly, showrunner Al Jean commented: "When Bart goes to the bathroom, Coldplay has to stop".

The episode featured a new character created by the winner of the "Best. Character. Ever". contest, in which fans could submit their own ideas for a new, and possibly recurring, Simpsons character. Over 25,000 entries were sent in. The winner of the contest was 52 year old Peggy Black from Orange, Connecticut, who created the character Ricardo Bomba. She described Ricardo as "someone that all the women love and all the men want to be". Black's inspiration for the character came from the fact that there were no characters like him on The Simpsons, and she thought Springfield needed "something like a Casanova". As part of the winning prize, Black was sent to work with the show's producers in Los Angeles. She worked with the animators to bring the character to life. In an interview with the Associated Press, Black stated she "described the character and they drew him so I could see if that was my vision of him". She continued, "It's amazing to see how they captured what I imagined. He's over the top". Executive producer Al Jean was one of the judges of the contest, which he described as "a thank you to loyal fans". Jean also noted that there is a possibility the Ricardo character might appear on the show again although this seems unlikely since the character appears to have been killed in a fiery car crash.

This episode contains several references pertaining to music, media, film, and other pop cultural phenomena. "Million Dollar Maybe" is the second episode in the series to have a title that parodies that of the film Million Dollar Baby, the first being the seventeenth-season episode "Million Dollar Abie". The Funtendo Zii is a fictional console that parodies the Nintendo Wii, with Zii Sports being a fictional game that parodies Wii Sports, a game that is bundled with most Wii consoles.

== Reception ==
"Million Dollar Maybe" was originally broadcast on January 31, 2010, in the United States as part of the animation television night on Fox. It was succeeded by episodes of The Cleveland Show, Family Guy, and American Dad!. The episode was viewed by 5.11 million viewers, despite simultaneously airing with the 52nd Grammy Awards on CBS, Desperate Housewives on ABC, and Dateline on NBC. It attained a 2.4 rating in the 18-49 demographic, according to Nielsen ratings, translating to 3.1 million viewers. Although it was the second highest rated program of the night, it was the lowest rated episode in the series' history up until the season twenty-two episode "The Great Simpsina". Total viewership and ratings for "Million Dollar Maybe" significantly declined from the previous episode, "Once Upon a Time in Springfield", which received 9.084 million viewers and garnered a 6.9 rating in the 18-49 demographic, according to Nielsen ratings.

"Million Dollar Maybe" was well received by television critics. Emily VanDerWerff of The A.V. Club gave the episode a 'B' grade, the highest of the night. VanDerWerff was polarized with the plot, opining that it was convoluted and stated, "This was a completely stupid plot, but to the show's credit, it commented on this when Homer told Marge he won the lottery and she said she'd much rather have the money than the wedding reception performance he missed". Similarly, VanDerWerff was split with the subplot of "Million Dollar Maybe". In regards to the subplot, she wrote, "The Lisa gets the old people a Wii stand-in plot was one of those ones where the Simpsons writers have obviously noticed something in pop culture but have yet to wholly grasp what it is or why it's important".

Robert Canning of IGN gave the episode an 8.1 out of 10, signifying a "great" rating. Canning felt that the episode was impressive, expressing that it was "a fun and funny episode focused on Homer and his always dysfunctional relationship with his family [...] just what we've come to love and expect after 20 years".

Jason Hughes of TV Squad gave the episode a more mixed review, praising the episode's humor, but calling it "random". Hughes wrote, "A lot about this episode bothered me, and I think The Simpsons has been having a pretty strong season for the most part". He resumed, "This one just didn't hold together as strongly as most of the prior ones". He went on to criticize the character development of Ricardo, opining that it was a "slap to the face to the winner". He then commented: "Peggy Black created Ricardo Bomba as a new ladies man type of figure, so the writers had him drive into a cliff wall and subsequent fiery explosion right away upon his first appearance. He didn't even get to finish what was, I guess, going to be his catchphrase".
