= Boy Meets Curl =

- The Simpsons episode
- Promotional image featuring Homer, Marge, Maggie, and broadcaster Bob Costas
- Episode no.: Season 21; Episode 12
- Directed by: Chuck Sheetz
- Written by: Rob LaZebnik
- Production code: MABF05
- Original air date: February 14, 2010

Guest appearance
- Bob Costas as himself

Episode features
- Couch gag: The family is depicted as tarot cards in a psychic reading that Grampa has. After the psychic deals the Death card (Maggie), Grampa pushes it back toward her and she falls over dead.

Episode chronology
| ← Previous "Million Dollar Maybe" | Next → "The Color Yellow" |
- The Simpsons season 21

"Boy Meets Curl" is the twelfth episode of the twenty-first season of the American animated television series The Simpsons. It originally aired on the Fox network in the United States on February 14, 2010. In this episode, Homer and Marge Simpson form a mixed curling team with Agnes and Seymour Skinner, which is chosen to play in the 2010 Winter Olympics in Vancouver. Meanwhile, Lisa begins collecting pins shaped like Olympic mascots, but her obsession soon turns to desperation.

With the Winter Olympics being held in Canada, the writers wanted an Olympic-themed episode that could air during the Games. The script was written by Rob LaZebnik, who considered having the plot revolve around Homer competing in four-man bobsled. However, he decided a curling episode would allow for the plot to revolve around Homer and Marge. In order to try to make the depiction of curling in the episode accurate, the writers visited a curling club and tried the sport themselves. They also consulted with a number of curlers. The episode was directed by Chuck Sheetz, while sportscaster Bob Costas guest-starred in the episode.

Airing during the Olympics, the episode was watched by 5.87 million viewers and had a Nielsen rating of 2.6.

The episode received positive reviews from critics, and CTV reported that Olympic curlers largely enjoyed the episode.

== Plot ==
Marge and Homer's plans for a romantic date night fall through when Homer is forced to stay longer than expected at the Springfield Nuclear Power Plant to fix a leak in one of the plant's nuclear processing pipes. Looking for a romantic activity after walking out of a movie starring Ben Affleck, they find an ice rink and decide to do some skating. However, they are unable to rent skates because it is curling night. They decide to try it and discover their innate talent for the sport, particularly Marge, who has years of experience sweeping floors. Agnes and Seymour Skinner notice and invite Marge and Homer to join their mixed-doubles team. It is announced that mixed-doubles has been added to the Winter Olympics as a demonstration sport, and the Skinner-Simpson team qualifies for the United States curling trials. Agnes cautions Marge not to let emotions get in the way of winning, relating how a fetal kick by an unborn Seymour foiled her chances at winning gold in the pole vault at the 1952 Summer Olympics in Helsinki At the trials, Marge's talented sweeping earns the team a win and a trip to the Winter Olympics in Vancouver.

Meanwhile, at the trials, Lisa is given an Olympic mascot pin, which she attaches to her dress. She decides that it "looks lonely" and buys another, but her interest in the pins quickly spirals out of control. The Simpsons arrive in Vancouver, where Agnes insists that Homer be cut from the team. Marge refuses and insists she can compensate for his weak throws, but Homer accidentally overhears the exchange and feels terrible. Marge continues to perform superbly, but she injures her right shoulder while sweeping to secure a win in the semifinals. She is told that she will never curl again and that the American team must forfeit the gold-medal match to Sweden, leading her to briefly lash out at Homer. Lisa's pin collection grows, and when she runs out of money, she trades her pearl necklace to a vendor in exchange for a pin from the 1924 Winter Olympics in Chamonix, France. Bart discovers Lisa busking on a street corner, having relinquished her dress in favor of wearing her pins at all times, and offers to help her kick her pin-collecting addiction. Cutting the lower portion of Homer's face from his driver's license and making it into a pin, Bart creates "Fatov", a phony mascot for the 2014 Winter Olympics in Sochi, Russia. He trades the pin to the vendor in exchange for Lisa's necklace.

As Marge prepares to leave Vancouver, she reveals to Homer that she is left-handed, but has always used her right hand to avoid seeming unusual. She has become cross-dominant, with enough dexterity to change Maggie's diaper and dress her one-handed. Homer and Marge return to the rink just in time to stop Seymour from forfeiting the match and go on to defeat Sweden for the gold. Agnes softens her attitude of unyielding contempt toward her son after he breaks his broom and has to drop out, and Marge and Homer agree that they had a great date night.

== Production ==
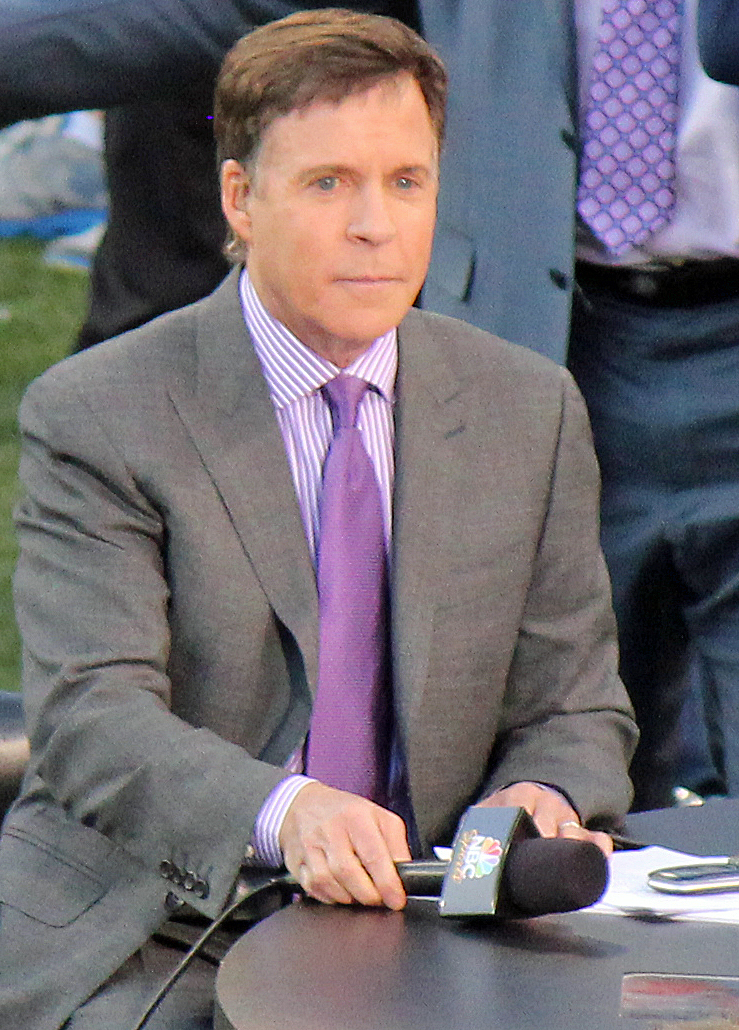
Sportscaster Bob Costas voiced himself in the episode.

With the 2010 Winter Olympics occurring in Vancouver, the writers wanted an Olympics-themed episode that could air during the Games. The script was written by Rob LaZebnik—his fourth writing credit—, who originally considered having the plot revolve around Homer competing in four-man bobsled. However, he decided a curling episode would allow for the plot to revolve around Homer and Marge and explore the issues of spouses competing together. The writers used some artistic license, because although curling is an Olympic sport, mixed-doubles, which is featured in the episode, was not an Olympic event at the time of airing (and made its Olympic debut eight years later). However, in the episode, it is explained that the event is being held as a demonstration sport. Curling had previously been shown in the season 13 episode "The Bart Wants What It Wants", when the family visits Toronto. In order to try to make the depiction of curling in the episode accurate, the writers visited a curling club and tried the sport themselves. They also consulted with four-time American mixed curling champions Brady and Cristin Clark, as well as Rick Patzke, the chief operating officer of the United States Curling Association, who felt that the writers took a "genuine interest" in the sport.

On the issue of whether competitive curlers would be offended by the episode, LaZebnik said "When you hear The Simpsons is going to do their take on your sport, you naturally get a little alarmed, But we ended up being respectful I would say, even, surprisingly respectful. Both Homer and Marge take it seriously." Some curlers, including the Clarks and Patzke, felt that the exposure the sport received was beneficial. Cristin Clark said "Although Homer Simpson probably isn't the ideal athlete I would want to see representing our sport, I just think it's great exposure." Canadian curler Randy Ferbey, a four-time world champion, said "I'm sure they're going to somehow make a mockery of it like they do every other thing, but I think you need to take it with a grain of salt. It brings attention to our sport and I think it's wonderful. The more curling on TV, whether it's in an animated form or real form, the better."

Sportscaster Bob Costas guest-starred in the episode as a caricature of himself.

== Cultural references ==
Homer's speech before he and Marge begin curling is a parody of the St Crispin's Day speech from Kenneth Branagh's version of Henry V. Across the street from the Olympic curling trials are the "National Curly trials", in reference to Curly Howard from The Three Stooges. The Medicine Woman who appeared in The Simpsons Movie appears in the streets of Vancouver, and Homer refers to her as his former therapist. The opening ceremonies in the episode are directed by Ivan Reitman, described by announcer Bob Costas as Canada's "most famous director". During the parade of athletes, nations are called to the tune of the theme song from Ghostbusters, which was directed by Reitman.

== Reception and legacy ==
In its original American broadcast, "Boy Meets Curl" was viewed by 5.87 million viewers and got a Nielsen rating of 2.6, with a 7 share of the audience. The episode came in third in its timeslot, but was the second-most viewed show on the Animation Domination lineup after Family Guy.

The episode received positive reviews.

Robert Canning of IGN gave the episode an 8.4/10 saying it was "Impressive" and "With or without the timeliness of the story and setting, 'Boy Meets Curl' was a fast and funny episode certain to be a highlight of the season".

Emily VanDerWerff of The A.V. Club gave the episode an A, the best grade of the night, saying "Simpsons was one of their best episodes in a long time, and it continues a season that's had some pretty good episodes overall. I wouldn't put this on The Simpsons' top tier, but I think it's definitely on that next tier down, episodes that maybe don't have the most original plots but do have solid jokes throughout. Even the Bart and Lisa B-plot, involving Lisa getting a sudden addiction to Olympic pin collecting, starts out kind of bland and gets better and better as Lisa's jones grows."

Jason Hughes of the TV Squad gave the episode a positive review as well saying "All in all, it was a weird time out of Springfield this week, with some highlight moments sprinkled throughout".

Steve Tilley of the Toronto Sun wrote "Sure, the episode was probably funnier for Canadians and curlers (and maybe Harry Potter fans) than anyone else, but it did prove Homer has got a bit of meteorological, psychic in him: 'Pack your winter coat, we're going to Canada's warmest city!'"

Bob Costas received praise for his appearance, particularly for his line "This is the sort of bittersweet melodrama Olympic coverage feeds on. I admit, we're vampires who suck on shattered dreams."

Jason Hughes of TV Squad called the line "about as accurate a description [of Olympic broadcasters] as I've ever seen."

CTV reported that Olympic curlers largely enjoyed the episode. American men's team coach Phill Drobnick said "The team watched it together and we gave it two thumbs up, they did a great job and it was reaching out to a new audience for our sport, so that's always great for us too." American team alternate Chris Plys said "They didn't make a mockery of the sport, which is nice. Curling catches a lot of abuse."

The episode gained attention in 2018 after the Winter Olympics in Pyeongchang when the United States defeated Sweden in men's curling to win the gold medal, with writers commentating how The Simpsons predicted a U.S. upset over Sweden eight years prior.
