= The Devil Wears Nada =

- The Simpsons episode
- Episode no.: Season 21; Episode 5
- Directed by: Nancy Kruse
- Written by: Tim Long
- Production code: LABF17
- Original air date: November 15, 2009

Episode features
- Chalkboard gag: "I do not have the hots for my mom"
- Couch gag: The Simpsons are cave people who sit on a log that sinks into a tar pit, with their skeletons appearing in a museum.

Episode chronology
← Previous "Treehouse of Horror XX"	Next → "Pranks and Greens"
- The Simpsons season 21

"The Devil Wears Nada" is the fifth episode of the twenty-first season of the American animated television series The Simpsons. It first aired on the Fox network in the United States on November 15, 2009. In the episode, Marge and a group called the "Charity Chicks" pose for a history-oriented calendar in hopes of raising money for charity, but Marge becomes the talk of the town due to the erotic poses she made after a few drinks of red wine. Meanwhile, Carl is chosen as the newest supervisor at the Springfield Nuclear Power Plant, and hires Homer to be his personal assistant.

The episode was written by Tim Long and directed by Nancy Kruse. It was broadcast soon after the character Marge had appeared on the cover of Playboy, though there was no connection between the episode and the cover; the idea for the episode was conceived first, and Marge's appearance was due to an unrelated offer from Playboy.

Since airing, "The Devil Wears Nada" has received mixed reviews from television critics.

It was watched by approximately 9.04 million viewers during its original broadcast. Clips showing the satirical appearances of French president Nicolas Sarkozy and his wife Carla Bruni in the episode became Internet hits in France, with hundreds of thousands of views on Dailymotion and YouTube.

== Plot ==
The episode opens at a retirement party for the current Sector 7G supervisor at the Springfield Nuclear Power Plant. Just as Homer, Lenny, and Carl are celebrating their freedom from supervision, plant owner Mr. Burns arrives and chooses Carl as the new supervisor, after quickly deducing that he is the only semi-competent employee of the three. Meanwhile, in an effort to raise money, Marge and her "Charity Chicks" philanthropic group decide to follow the Springfield Police Department's lead and pose for a history-themed "sexy" calendar. At the photo studio, however, Marge, as Babe Didrikson Zaharias, does not want to show any skin. The photographer, Julio, loosens her up with red wine, and she ends up revealing more than she planned. Marge and her erotic poses are soon the hottest talk in town, as all the calendar photos are of her.

Back at the plant, Carl makes Homer his new executive assistant. That evening, Marge's libido pumped up by the male population's positive feedback on her calendar is running high, but Homer is too overworked and exhausted by Carl's demands to satisfy her. This becomes an unhappy trend, and Marge feels ignored. Homer tries to make up for it by taking Marge out to a romantic hotel, but during their stay, he receives a phone call from Carl who tells him they are going to Paris on a business trip. When Homer leaves the Simpsons' house the next morning, a frustrated Marge throws a mallet after his retreating taxicab, but she accidentally knocks out neighbor Ned Flanders instead and invites him and his children over for a family dinner by way of apology.

In Paris, Carl is having a great time flirting with a beautiful woman, and he reveals to Homer that he plans to extend their stay indefinitely. Homer is devastated, and walks forlornly through the streets where everything reminds him of Marge. He eventually forces Carl to give him his old job back by revealing that the woman Carl has been flirting with is actually Carla Bruni, the wife of French president Nicolas Sarkozy, and threatens to tell him of their affair.

Back in Springfield, Bart and Lisa bail on Marge's dinner, and Ned shows up alone because Rod and Todd have been grounded after watching a trailer for Grey's Anatomy and not telling him straightaway. The innocent dinner soon turns romantic, and Marge and Ned nearly kiss, until Marge catches sight of her wedding photo in the reflection of Ned's glasses and realizes that it would be wrong. Homer arrives home just as Marge is bidding Ned goodnight, and Homer and Marge make love, undisturbed at last.

== Production ==
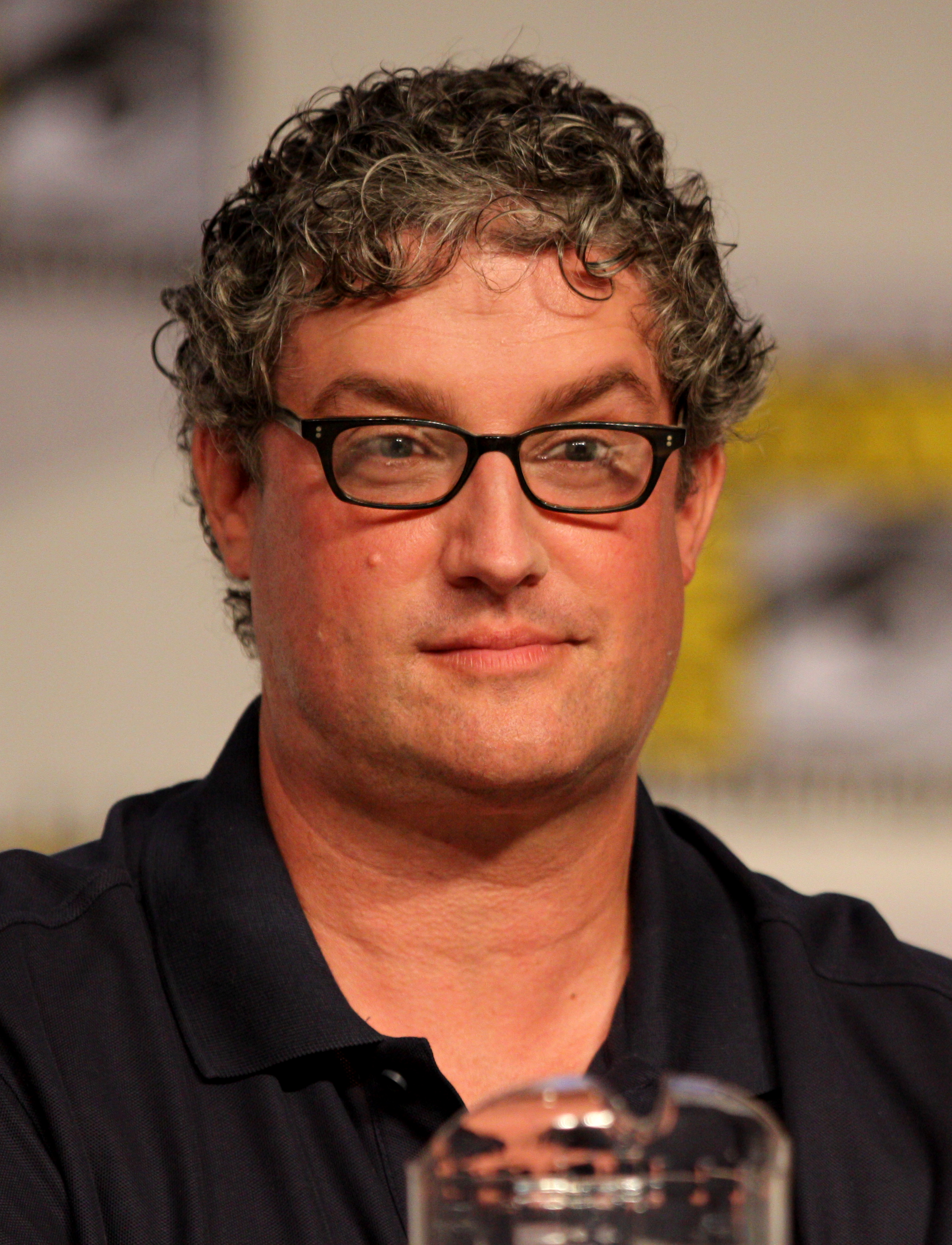
Al Jean has said that the sexual nature of the episode made the staff nervous.

"The Devil Wears Nada" was written by Tim Long and directed by Nancy Kruse. It is partly based on the film The Devil Wears Prada, especially the scenes that feature an overworked and over-utilized Homer. The episode aired soon after the character Marge had appeared on the cover of the real-life adult magazine Playboy. Executive producer Al Jean told the Toronto Sun that this episode was "a little bit of a reference to Marge's recent encounter with Playboy". Jean explained, though, that the writers came up with the storyline for "The Devil Wears Nada" over a year before the episode aired and they did not know back then that Marge would become a Playboy cover girl. Jean said that was "an independent offer from Playboy. But we thought, to be smart, we should probably have the episode and Marge's cover come out around the same time." In regards to Marge's explicit plotline in the episode, Jean commented that the Simpsons staff is "always a bit nervous when we push the boundaries or do something unusual and I usually think that's where we do our best stuff, and this episode is definitely one of those cases."

== Reception ==
During the episode's original broadcast on the Fox network in the United States on November 4, 2012, it was watched by approximately 9.04 million viewers. In the demographic for adults aged 18–49, the episode received a 4.2 rating and a 10 share. It was the second-highest rated television series in the 8:00 p.m. timeslot, following Football Night in America, which received a 5.3 rating and 15.1 million viewers.

Since airing, "The Devil Wears Nada" has received mixed reviews from television critics.

AOL TV's Jason Hughes was positive about the episode, commenting that "everything about the episode worked, from Marge's sexy calendar to Ned Flanders' role in the final moments." He added that he thought the episode featured "the heart I felt was missing all season. The love between Homer and Marge dominated this episode, coming in equal strength from both sides." Hughes concluded that "The Devil Wears Nada" featured "good moments for humor" and that it was "perfectly balanced, written and executed".

Emily VanDerWerff of The A.V. Club was less positive, giving the episode a C+ rating. She commented that because there have already been so many episodes about Homer and Marge's marital troubles, it becomes more difficult every time to make the episodes emotional. VanDerWerff added that "while the flip side of the usual husband/wife sexual dynamics had a few promising jokes in it and while there were the usual funny sight gags and one-liners, the entirety of the episode felt stale. [...] There's no way Homer or Marge will ever cheat on each other, and that makes a story like this essentially boring."

IGN's Robert Canning gave the episode a rating of 6.2 out of 10, calling it disappointing. He commented that he enjoyed the first act of the episode because it had a lot of potential storylines, but it went downhill from there and became boring. Canning added: "This was another case of the series returning to familiar storylines. It's tough to get away from this one — trouble in the bedroom — as they are a married couple and this is, essentially, a sitcom. Unfortunately, 'The Devil Wears Nada' doesn't give the story anything new." Similarly to VanDerWerff, Canning did not find the episode enjoying because it was obvious that Marge and Ned would not have "a night of passion" since "Marge is too loving a wife and Ned is too good a Christian".

=== Reaction in France ===
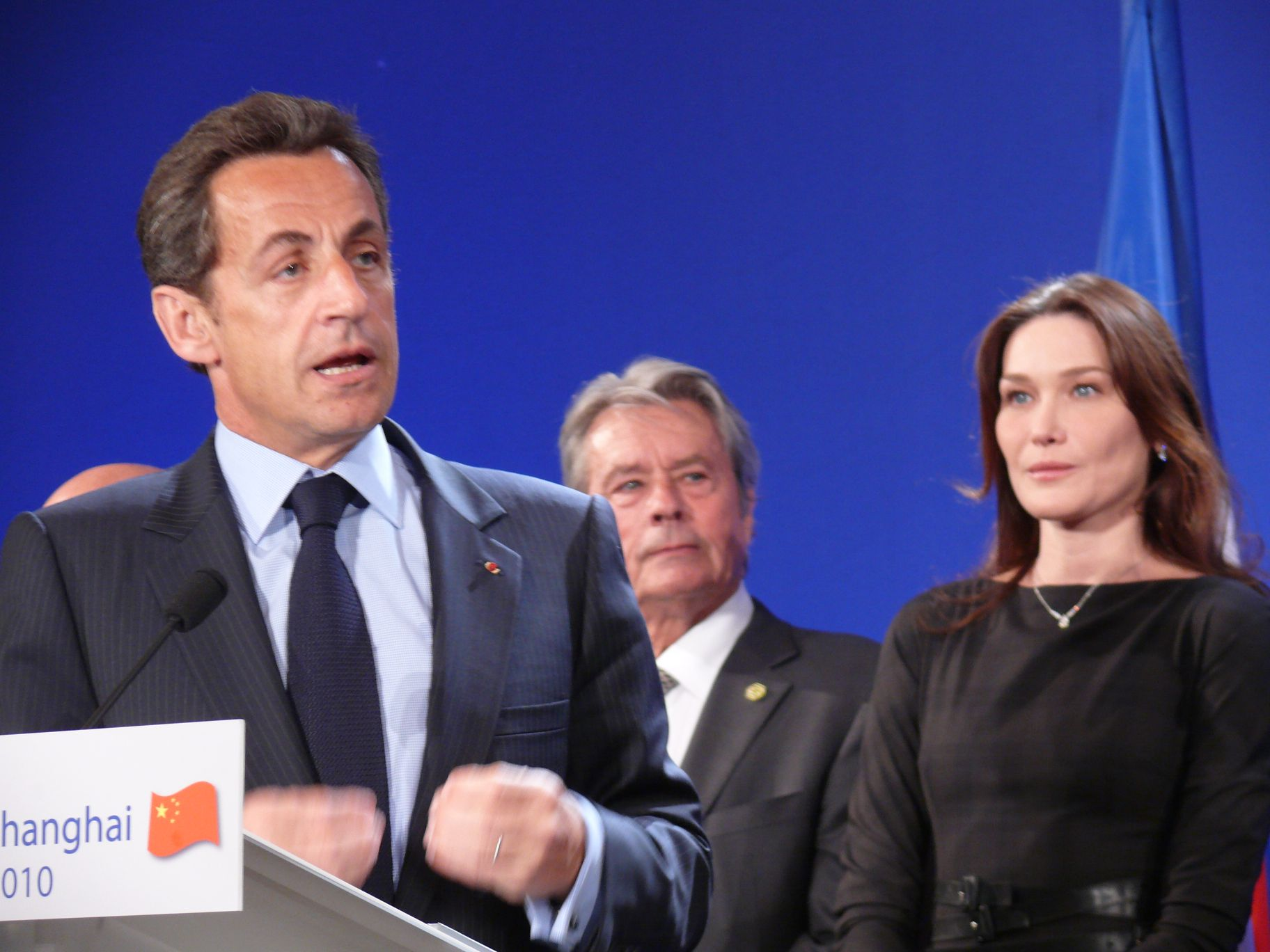
French president Nicolas Sarkozy (left) and his wife Carla Bruni (right) appear in the episode.

"The Devil Wears Nada" features the satirical appearances of French president Nicolas Sarkozy and his wife Carla Bruni. In the episode, Carl is approached by Bruni at a reception at Élysée Palace, the official residence of the president, where she tells him that she wants "to make love, right now." Homer later reveals to Carl that the woman he has been seeing is Bruni, and threatens to tell Sarkozy if he does not get his old job back. Carl does not believe Homer will tell, so Homer calls Sarkozy (who is seen eating cheese and drinking red wine in his office with Bruni). Sarkozy answers the phone saying "You're getting cozy with Sarkozy." At this point, Carl gives in, and Homer hangs up the phone.

Unlike other high-ranking politicians such as Tony Blair, who have guest starred on The Simpsons, the couple did not actually lend their voices to the show and the appearances were made without their permission. Agence France-Presse wrote that as a result, it was a "harsher" parody in comparison to the parodies on the show of people that have provided their own voices. The French newspaper Le Figaro said she was characterized as "a nymphomaniac with an exaggerated French accent". Bruni had previously attracted media attention in the United States because of her many reported partners and lovers. A reporter for The Times in Paris, Charles Bremner, wrote that her "sulphurous former image as the girlfriend of rock stars and celebrities was mocked".

Clips on YouTube and Dailymotion showing Sarkozy's and Bruni's appearances were viewed hundreds of thousands of times in France, becoming internet hits. According to Agence France-Presse, the cameos "passed largely unnoticed in France until Friday [November 20], when news websites started linking to pirated clips of the episode, creating a buzz which saw more than 117,000 fans linking to the DailyMotion site alone." As of Saturday November 21, the Dailymotion clip had received 440,000 hits. Reactions to the clips were mixed from the French viewers. Bruni's spokeswoman did not respond to requests for comment either, but Bremner reported that Bruni "laughed when asked about the programme".

The French news website Rue 89 commented that the episode provided the writers with a good opportunity to mock all the French clichés, including the accent, the cheese, the cheek kissing between men, and the supposed nymphomania.
