= Chuck Sheetz =

American animation director and producer (born 1960)

- Education: University of California, Los Angeles
- Occupations: Director, animation director, writer, producer
- Years active: 1980–present
- Known for: The Simpsons; The Critic; King of the Hill; Recess; What's New, Scooby-Doo?

Chuck Sheetz is an American director, animator, animation director, educator, and producer. He is best known for his work on The Simpsons, What's New, Scooby-Doo?, and Recess.

== Early life ==
Sheetz grew up outside Philadelphia, Pennsylvania. He moved to Los Angeles at age 19 to attend the UCLA School of Theater, Film and Television. Sheetz's career in animation started in 1980 with the creation of his short film, "Wild Times in the Wildwood". He later received a Master's of Fine Art from the UCLA Animation Workshop.

== Career ==
Sheetz began working as an animation timer, and later an assistant director, on The Simpsons. He began working as a director on The Critic, a series created by Simpsons-veterans Mike Reiss and Al Jean.

Other shows he has worked on include Bobby's World, Rocko's Modern Life, King of the Hill, Fresh Beat Band of Spies, What's New, Scooby Doo?, and The Adventures of Rocky and Bullwinkle. In addition, Sheetz directed the Drawn Together episode "Captain Hero's Marriage Pact" as well as the Welcome to Eltingville pilot episode.

Sheetz has been a director of episodes on the Disney Television series Recess, and in 2001 he directed the film Recess: School's Out.

Sheetz returned to The Simpsons to direct multiple episodes and in 2007 he was an animation director on The Simpsons Movie. He also won an Emmy Award for Outstanding Animated Program for directing the episode "Eternal Moonshine of the Simpson Mind" in 2008.

He has recently been a director on the series Duncanville and The Harper House.

In addition to his work in animation, Sheetz has been a professor at the UCLA Animation Workshop. He has also been a member of the Animation Peer Group at the Television Academy.

== The Simpsons episodes ==
He has directed the following episodes:

- "The Twisted World of Marge Simpson" (1997)
- "Simpsoncalifragilisticexpiala(Annoyed Grunt)cious" (1997)
- "I'm Goin' to Praiseland" (2001)
- "I am Furious Yellow" (2002)
- "Springfield Up" (2007)
- "Treehouse of Horror XVIII" (2007)
- "Eternal Moonshine of the Simpson Mind" (2007)
- "Any Given Sundance" (2008)
- "Wedding for Disaster" (2009)
- "Pranks and Greens" (2009)
- "Boy Meets Curl" (2010)
- "The Ned-Liest Catch" (2011)
- "The Daughter Also Rises" (2012)
- "Ned 'n' Edna's Blend Agenda" (2012)
- "Gorgeous Grampa" (2013)
- "The Saga of Carl" (2013)
- "The Winter of His Content" (2014)
- "The Wreck of the Relationship" (2014)

== Duncanville episodes ==
He has directed the following episodes:

- "Undercuva Mutha" (2020)
- "Sister, Wife" (2020)
- "Classless President" (2020)
