= The Simpsons 20th Anniversary Special – In 3-D! On Ice! =

2010 television film

- Genre: Documentary; Comedy
- Written by: Jeremy Chilnick; Morgan Spurlock
- Directed by: Morgan Spurlock
- Country of origin: United States
- Original language: English

Production
- Running time: 42 minutes
- Production company: 20th Century Fox Television

Original release
- Network: Fox
- Release: January 10, 2010

The Simpsons 20th Anniversary Special – In 3-D! On Ice! is a documentary special that examined the "cultural phenomenon" of the American animated television series The Simpsons. It originally aired on the Fox network in the United States on January 10, 2010. The special was directed by Morgan Spurlock.

== Content ==
The film examines the "cultural phenomenon" of The Simpsons and includes interviews with both the cast and fans of the show.

== Production ==
=== Background ===
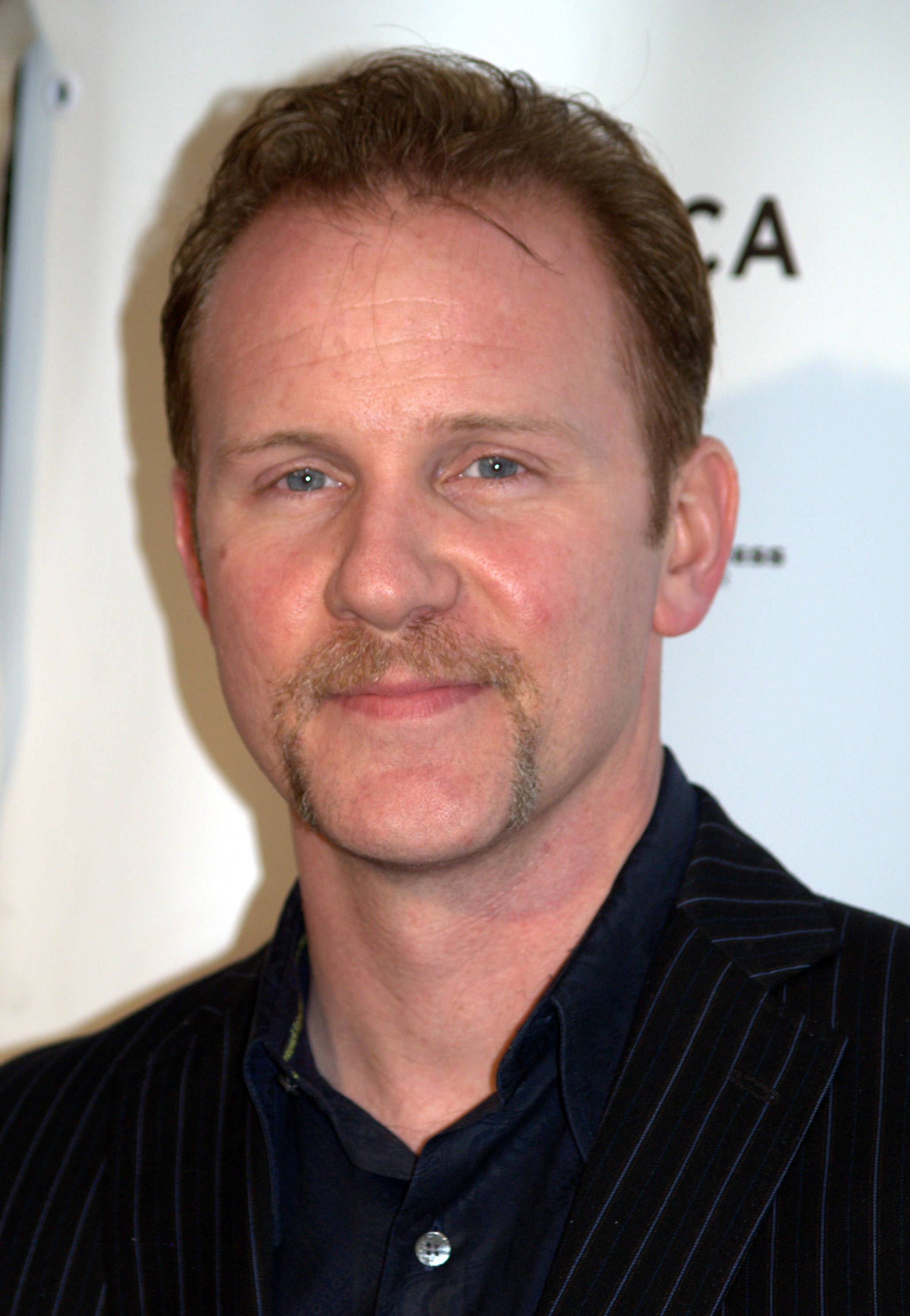
Director Morgan Spurlock had been a fan of The Simpsons since his college days.

In 2009, to celebrate the 20th anniversary of the premiere of The Simpsons, Fox announced that a year-long celebration of the show titled "Best. 20 Years. Ever." would run from January 14, 2009 to January 14, 2010. Morgan Spurlock, an Academy Award-nominated documentary filmmaker (Best Documentary Feature for Super Size Me in 2004) and fan of The Simpsons since his college days, was asked to direct the special in February 2009.

The producers of The Simpsons were impressed with an animated sequence in Spurlock's 2008 film Where in the World Is Osama bin Laden? and decided to ask him to direct the special. Spurlock immediately accepted the offer, describing the opportunity as "the coolest thing I could ever get to do in my career." The special was later announced in July 2009.

The producers spent several months deciding on the content and format of the film. Spurlock believes "the reason [the producers] called [him] to begin with was to not have a show that would be a glad-hand, pat-everyone-on-the-back special, that's why rooting it in the people who kept this show on the air for the last 20 years is important." It was originally scheduled to air on January 14, 2010, exactly twenty years after the first broadcast of "Bart the Genius", the first regular episode of the series after the Christmas special "Simpsons Roasting on an Open Fire". However, it was instead shown on January 10, 2010 alongside "Once Upon a Time in Springfield", which was promoted as the 450th episode of the series despite being the 451st.

Despite its promotion as a special event broadcast, The Simpsons 20th Anniversary Special – In 3-D! On Ice! was directed by Spurlock as a component of the series' 20th production season. It therefore received a Simpsons episode production code (LABF21, seen in the closing credits), one production number higher than the episode which aired alongside it ("Once Upon a Time in Springfield", LABF20).

=== Filming ===
"Our goal was to bring the [special] in through the viewpoint of how the world sees the show and how the show sees the world. We spoke to a ton of fans, the people who kept the show on the air for 20 years."

— Morgan Spurlock.

The special includes interviews with fans from ten to fifteen countries. Filming of the special began at San Diego Comic-Con. A casting call for fans was held on July 25, 2009, with the hopes of finding "some of the most incredible super-fans that the world has ever seen." Spurlock has filmed interviews with a man who grew real-life "Tomacco" (a mix of tobacco and tomato, based on the episode "E-I-E-I-(Annoyed Grunt)"), the man with the most Simpsons tattoos and a couple that had a Simpsons-themed wedding.

On August 12, 2009, Spurlock and The A.V. Club writer Steven Hyden attended a Pacific Coast League baseball game between the Albuquerque Isotopes and Tacoma Rainiers at Isotopes Park in Albuquerque, New Mexico. The Isotopes' name was inspired by the season 12 episode "Hungry, Hungry Homer", where Homer attempts to thwart the Springfield Isotopes' plan to move to Albuquerque. Subsequently, when an Albuquerque Tribune online survey helped the team decide its new name, "Isotopes" received 67 percent of the 120,000 votes.

Spurlock filmed several scenes in both Glasgow and Aberdeen, Scotland. Both cities have claimed to be the home of character Groundskeeper Willie, based on various bits of dialogue from the series. He also conducted tongue-in-cheek interviews with former Lord Provost of Glasgow Liz Cameron and former Aberdeen FC manager Mark McGhee.

== Reception ==
In its original broadcast, The Simpsons 20th Anniversary Special – In 3-D! On Ice! earned a 5.6 Nielsen rating in the 18–49 demographic and had approximately 13 million viewers. The first half got 13.462 million viewers and a rating of 6.3 and 15% share for the 18–49 rating and the second half got 11.171 million viewers with a rating of 5.4 and a 12% share. The episode ranked 14th in the weekly ratings and ranked 6th in the 18-49 rating.

The special got an average Metacritic rating of 64. Robert Canning of IGN called the special "impressive", saying that "It's really just one big fan talking to a bunch of other fans (which includes the creators) about a series we all love. And heck, the special is worth a watch if only to hear how Conan O'Brien would write the ending to the longest-running series in the history of television." Emily VanDerWerff of The A.V. Club gave the special a B−.

L'Osservatore Romano congratulated the show on its 20 years as a show, stating "Without Homer Simpson and the other yellow-skinned characters, many today wouldn't know how to laugh". The special also received a nomination for Primetime Emmy Award for Outstanding Nonfiction Special. It lost, however, to Teddy: In His Own Words, a special about Ted Kennedy.

== See also ==
- The Simpsons season 21
