= Stealing First Base =

- The Simpsons episode
- Episode no.: Season 21; Episode 15
- Directed by: Steven Dean Moore
- Written by: John Frink
- Production code: MABF07
- Original air date: March 21, 2010

Guest appearances
- Angela Bassett as Michelle Obama; Sarah Silverman as Nikki McKenna

Episode features
- Chalkboard gag: "World War II could not beat up World War I"
- Couch gag: The couch is replaced by an empty garden. It rains, a giant squash is produced, and Bart, Marge, Maggie and Lisa (as insects) fly to the vegetable, hoping for a meal. Homer's caterpillar-like head pops out thereof, and the rest of the family comes around him.

Episode chronology
| ← Previous "Postcards from the Wedge" | Next → "The Greatest Story Ever D'ohed" |
- The Simpsons season 21

"Stealing First Base" is the fifteenth episode of the twenty-first season of the American animated television series The Simpsons. It originally aired on the Fox network in the United States on March 21, 2010. In this episode, Bart falls in love with a girl named Nikki from a second fourth-grade class, but when he kisses her, Nikki begins treating Bart like dirt. Meanwhile, First Lady Michelle Obama teaches Lisa that there is no shame in being an overachiever, and Nelson Muntz teaches a blind boy how to be a schoolyard bully.

The episode was written by John Frink and directed by Steven Dean Moore. The episode was also watched by 5.69 million households and received a 2.8/8 in the 18-49 Nielsen Rating. The episode received mixed reviews from critics. The episode guest stars Sarah Silverman as Nikki and Angela Bassett as Michelle Obama.

== Plot ==
Bart's fourth-grade class is merged with another fourth-grade class when teacher Mrs. Krabappel is absent. In the crowded classroom, Bart is forced to sit by a new student named Nikki. At first, they dislike each other, until Nikki admires Bart's artistic skills. Bart seeks romance advice from Homer, who passes him off to Grandpa Abe. After Grandpa advises Bart to kiss Nikki, however, when Bart does so after the two skateboard together, she recoils in disgust. Nikki's attorney's parents threaten to sue the school unless it is declared an "affection-free environment". Superintendent Chalmers causes a play in which Willie plays Nikki and Skinner plays Bart who was strangled by Homer after calling him a "Fatso", meaning they are forced to kiss. Bart is confused at the outcome of this seemingly innocent action, and his confusion is later amplified when Nikki hides in his locker and kisses him again.

Meanwhile, Lisa becomes popular when she receives an F on a test, but becomes unpopular again when it is revealed that her test was mistakenly given to Ralph, as both tests were mixed up as the F grade was supposed to be given to Ralph who had written Lisa's name on his test. Angry about being ostracized for being an overachiever once again, Lisa blogs about it, and her post is noted by a mysterious blogger known as Flotus 1 who turns out to be First Lady Michelle Obama. Obama drops by Springfield Elementary to give a speech about the importance of academics and recommends that the students should be nice to Lisa and other overachievers like her friends, Martin Prince and Allison Taylor.

Bart and Nikki have been watching this speech from the roof, and Bart confesses to Nikki he does not understand her ever-changing moods. They argue and Bart stumbles, falling off the roof. Nikki says "I love you," but seeing that Bart is breathing treats him badly again. Bart stops breathing again, but the school's "no-touch" policy prevents anyone from performing CPR. Nikki defies the policy and revives Bart via mouth-to-mouth, thus setting off a montage of kiss scenes from various movies, some of which (such as Alien 3) never even had kiss scenes in them. When Bart awakes, Nikki's mood changes yet again and Bart remains in a state of complete confusion over female behavior. He tells her he does not care what happens between her and him, but then changes his mind and yells out "I love you!" after she kisses him once again.

Throughout the episode, Nelson Muntz has befriended a blind boy and teaches him how to laugh at the misfortunes of others. In the end, the blind boy tricks Nelson into believing that a punch he sustained after insulting Nelson restored his sight. When he reveals to Nelson that this was a prank and laughs at Nelson's signature "haw haw", Nelson is as impressed as he is touched by the achievement.

== Production ==
The episode is written by John Frink and directed by Steven Dean Moore, his second director credit for the season after "O Brother, Where Bart Thou?". The episode features guest star Sarah Silverman as Nikki (Bart's crush) and Angela Bassett as Michelle Obama.

In September 2016, executive producer James L. Brooks told Variety that the crew had been "aggressive" in trying to get Obama to voice herself, and received a rejection note saying "good try".

== Cultural references ==
In the classroom, Nikki shows Bart a book about vampires which looks like the Twilight series book New Moon, which reads Red Moon. In the scene where Nikki performs CPR on Bart, recreations of kissing scenes from a variety of films and television shows are shown. These scenes are (in order); From Here to Eternity (1953), Gone with the Wind (1939), The Quiet Man (1952), Lady and the Tramp (1955), Planet of the Apes (1968), On Golden Pond (1981), Ghost (1990), Spider-Man (2002), Star Trek (2009), Beauty and the Beast (1987–1990), The Public Enemy (1931), WALL-E (2008), Alien 3 (1992), The Godfather: Part II (1974), and an All in the Family (1971–1979) episode in which Sammy Davis Jr. guest starred. The sequence, and the accompanying musical score, are a nod to Cinema Paradiso (1988), directed by Giuseppe Tornatore, with score by Ennio and Andrea Morricone. The Itchy & Scratchy cartoon is a parody of the 1982 film Koyaanisqatsi: Life Out of Balance, here titled Koyaanis-Scratchy: Death Out of Balance.

== Reception ==
=== Viewing figures ===
In its original American broadcast, "Stealing First Base" was watched by 5.69 million households getting a 2.8/8 in the 18-49 Nielsen Rating. The episode came in second in its time slot and was the second most-watched show on Fox that night, after a new episode of Family Guy.

=== Critical response ===
Emily VanDerWerff of The A.V. Club criticized the episode, giving it a C+, calling the harassment storyline "pointless and stupid" although praised the Nelson subplot.

However, Jason Hughes of HuffPost TV praised the storyline, writing "I applaud the series for facing such an issue with such intensity, and handling it with humor and compassion".

Robert Canning of IGN gave the episode an 8 out of 10, saying that "Nikki turned out to be a fun and memorable character." Overall he stated that "Although ‘Stealing First Base’ fed us some old ideas, it did so with a lot of great bits...and some very strong guest voices."

=== Awards and nominations ===
Writer John Frink was nominated for the Annie Award for Outstanding Achievement for Writing in an Animated Television/Broadcast Production at the 38th Annie Awards for this episode.

== Soundtrack ==
The scene where Bart and Nikki were performing a skateboard parkour contains the song "Chase" by Giorgio Moroder on the original FOX broadcast. When the episode is shown in syndication, "Chase" is replaced by a musically similar composition.

The classical music that is heard during the montage of movie kiss scenes is from Cinema Paradiso - "Love Theme", composed by Andrea Morricone.
