= Another Simpsons Clip Show =

- The Simpsons episode
- Episode no.: Season 6 Episode 3
- Directed by: David Silverman
- Written by: Jon Vitti (credited as "Penny Wise")
- Production code: 2F33
- Original air date: September 25, 1994

Guest appearances
- Albert Brooks as Jacques; Sara Gilbert as Laura Powers; Kelsey Grammer as Sideshow Bob; Jon Lovitz as Artie Ziff; Michelle Pfeiffer as Mindy Simmons; Phil Hartman as Troy McClure (all in clips only)

Episode features
- Chalkboard gag: "I will not use abbrev"
- Couch gag: The Simpsons sit on the couch and get crushed by the paper cut-out foot from Monty Python's Flying Circus.
- Commentary: Matt Groening; David Mirkin; David Silverman

Episode chronology
← Previous "Lisa's Rival" "A Simpsons Clip Show"	Next → "Itchy & Scratchy Land"
- The Simpsons season 6

"Another Simpsons Clip Show" is the third episode of the sixth season of the American animated television series The Simpsons. It originally aired on Fox in the United States on September 25, 1994. In this episode, Marge reads a romance novel in bed, and it prompts her to have a family meeting, where the Simpson family recall their past loves in form of clips from previous episodes.

The episode was written by Jon Vitti (credited as "Penny Wise") and directed by David Silverman. It is the second The Simpsons episode featuring a clip show format and uses clips from all the previous five seasons. The episode features cultural references to the 1992 book The Bridges of Madison County. The episode has received generally negative reviews even compared to other Simpsons clip shows. It acquired a Nielsen rating of 8.7 and was the fourth highest rated show on the Fox network that week.

== Plot ==
Marge is reading The Bridges of Madison County one night and wakes up Homer to ask if he thinks the romance has gone out of their marriage. Homer ignores her and tosses the book into the fireplace.

The next morning, Marge gets the family together to discuss romance. She tells the family about the time she almost had an affair with a bowler named Jacques, (Note: As depicted in the 1990 episode "Life on the Fast Lane") which prompts Homer to tell the story of how he was tempted to cheat on Marge with a co-worker who had a similar personality. (Note: As depicted in the 1993 episode "The Last Temptation of Homer") Lisa recounts the story of her doomed relationship with Ralph Wiggum (Note: As depicted in the 1993 episode "I Love Lisa") and Bart remembers his first crush, (Note: As depicted in the 1992 episode "New Kid on the Block") both of which ended in heartbreak. Desperately searching for a love story with a happy ending, they also recount Marge's sister Selma's failed marriage to Sideshow Bob (Note: As depicted in the 1992 episode "Black Widower") and the love triangle between Abe Simpson, Montgomery Burns and Marge's mother Jacqueline. (Note: As depicted in the 1994 episode "Lady Bouvier's Lover")

Marge sadly notes that it seems that all love stories have sad endings. Homer, however, saves the day when he tells the story of how he and Marge got together in high school. (Note: As depicted in the 1991 episode "The Way We Was") They passionately embrace while the kids run off to watch Itchy & Scratchy.

== Production ==
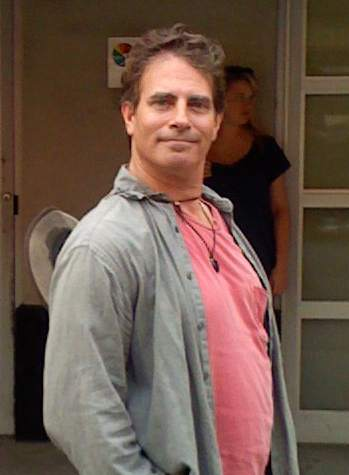
David Silverman directed the episode.

As the title of the episode suggests, it is the second clip show episode of The Simpsons after "So It's Come to This: A Simpsons Clip Show", the 18th episode of the fourth season. It was written by Jon Vitti, who used the pseudonym Penny Wise in the closing credits because he did not want to be credited for writing a clip show, and it was directed by David Silverman. The episode also includes contributions from John Swartzwelder, Frank Mula, David Richardson, Jeff Martin, Bill Oakley, Josh Weinstein, Matt Groening, Sam Simon, Al Jean, Mike Reiss, Jay Kogen, Wallace Wolodarsky, Nell Scovell, David M. Stern, George Meyer, Conan O'Brien, Robert Cohen, Bill Canterbury, and Dan McGrath.

During the early years of the show, the staff was forced by the Fox network into doing clip shows to save money. There was originally intense pressure on the producers of the show to create extra episodes in each season, and the plan was to make four clip shows per season to meet that limit. Writers and producers, however, felt that this many clip shows would alienate fans of the series. The Fox network's reasoning was that clip shows cost half of what a normal episode costs to produce, but they could sell syndication rights at full price.

This flashback episode uses clips from episodes released during the first five seasons:

Referenced clips in "Another Simpsons Clip Show"
Episode	Season	Description
"New Kid on the Block"	4	Homer searches for his hot dog while lounging in a wading pool.
"Dog of Death"	3	Homer tosses Marge's book into the fireplace.
"Krusty Gets Busted"	1	The children watch an Itchy & Scratchy episode.
"Homer the Heretic"	4	The Itchy & Scratchy episode "Flay Me to the Moon".
"Bart's Friend Falls in Love"	3	The students in Bart's class watch Fuzzy Bunny's Guide to You-Know-What.
"I Love Lisa"	4	Ned serenading Maude.
"Marge Gets a Job"	4	Smithers dreams about Mr. Burns flying in through the window.
Montage sequence	1 – 4	Prank calls to Moe.
Montage sequence	3 – 5	Homer's "Mmm..." lines.
"Homer Loves Flanders"	5	Homer kissing Ned repeatedly at a local football game.
"Life on the Fast Lane"	1	Marge tells her story of how she almost fell in love with a French bowler.
"The Last Temptation of Homer"	5	Homer tells the story of how he almost cheated on Marge with Mindy Simmons.
"New Kid on the Block"	4	Bart tells the story of how he fell for Laura Powers, the only girl he ever loved.
"I Love Lisa"	4	Lisa tells the story of Ralph Wiggum's crush on her which ended in him being heartbroken.
"Black Widower"	3	Marge recalls Selma's marriage to Sideshow Bob.
"Lady Bouvier's Lover"	5	Marge recalls the love triangle between Grampa Simpson, Jacqueline Bouvier, and Mr. Burns.
"The Way We Was"	2	Homer finds a love story that does not end in heartbreak: his relationship with Marge.
Montage sequence	1 – 5	Homer and Marge kissing.

=== Cultural references ===
When Bart, Lisa, and Maggie are watching Itchy & Scratchy, Marge says they watch the same episodes all the time, while Lisa says that the Itchy & Scratchy cartoons are just pasted together from pieces of old episodes. This comment is a joke about the construction of this episode; the blackboard and couch gags are taken from other episodes, there are clips from past episodes, and the interstitials are actually clips from past episodes that feature the family members talking in the kitchen. These three aspects support the idea of this episode being a clip show to the extreme.

In the clip from "Lady Bouvier's Lover", Grampa tries to stop the wedding between Jacqueline Bouvier and Mr. Burns by banging on the window while shouting "Mrs. Bouvier!", before running away with her on a bus. The whole sequence is a reference to the 1967 film The Graduate. The plot of the episode is kicked off by Marge reading the 1992 book The Bridges of Madison County by Robert James Waller.

== Reception ==
=== Critical reception ===
The episode received generally negative reviews, since clip shows tend to be the least favorite episodes among fans. The episode has been described as "framed in such a way as to still make [it] worth watching,[...] like a slideshow that's not quite so boring", "another clip show, although not the worst of them", and "the episode title pretty much says it all". Colin Jacobson of DVD Movie Guide said in a review: "The romance related storyline fizzles. That leaves us with a good collection of clips, but since we can already watch them in their original episodes, why bother with this cheap excuse for product?"

Lisa's comments — "romance is dead, it was acquired in a hostile takeover by Hallmark and Disney, homogenized, and sold off piece-by-piece" — have been used in case studies of the cultural representations of organizations.

Scottish indie-rock band Arab Strap referred to this episode in the lyrics of their debut single "The First Big Weekend" ("Sunday afternoon we go up to John's with a lot of beer in time to watch The Simpsons - it was a really good episode about love always ending in tragedy except, of course, for Marge and Homer. It was quite moving at the end and to tell you the truth my eyes were a bit damp").

=== Ratings ===
In its original broadcast, "Another Simpsons Clip Show" finished 68th in the ratings for the week of September 19 to September 25, 1994, with a Nielsen rating of 8.7. The episode was the fourth highest rated show on the Fox network that week, beaten only by Beverly Hills, 90210, The X-Files, and Married... with Children.

== Bibliography ==
- Alberti, John (2004). Leaving Springfield: The Simpsons and the Possibility of Oppositional Culture. Wayne State University Press. p. 316. ISBN 0-8143-2849-0.
- Gimple, Scott M. (December 1, 1999). The Simpsons Forever!: A Complete Guide to Our Favorite Family ...Continued. HarperCollins. p. 24. ISBN 978-0-06-098763-3. OCLC 42857430.
- Groening, Matt (1997). Richmond, Ray; Coffman, Antonia (eds.). The Simpsons: A Complete Guide to Our Favorite Family (1st ed.). New York: HarperPerennial. ISBN 978-0-06-095252-5. LCCN 98141857. OCLC 37796735. OL 433519M.
- Turner, Chris (2004). Planet Simpson: How a Cartoon Masterpiece Documented an Era and Defined a Generation. Foreword by Douglas Coupland. (1st ed.). Toronto: Random House Canada. ISBN 978-0-679-31318-2. OCLC 55682258.
