= Homer's Triple Bypass =

- The Simpsons episode
- Episode no.: Season 4 Episode 11
- Directed by: David Silverman
- Written by: Gary Apple; Michael Carrington
- Production code: 9F09
- Original air date: December 17, 1992

Episode features
- Chalkboard gag: "Coffee is not for kids" (as he writes, each line becomes more and more scrawled).
- Couch gag: A very small Simpson family sits on a giant couch.
- Commentary: Matt Groening; Al Jean; Mike Reiss; Michael Carrington; David Silverman

Episode chronology
← Previous "Lisa's First Word"	Next → "Marge vs. the Monorail"
- The Simpsons season 4

"Homer's Triple Bypass" is the eleventh episode of the fourth season of the American animated television series The Simpsons. It originally aired on Fox in the United States on December 17, 1992. The episode was written by Gary Apple and Michael Carrington and directed by David Silverman.

== Plot ==
One evening while eating a feast in bed, Homer seems to be having heart problems but is not concerned. The next morning, Marge makes him oatmeal for breakfast but he rejects it (claiming there is a bug in it) in favor of bacon and eggs, despite the chest pains he has been feeling. Driving to work, he hears an irregular thumping noise, and is relieved when a gas station mechanic tells him the noise is coming from his heart, not his car.

After Mr. Burns observes Homer eating and sleeping on the job, he brings Homer into his office, berates him, and threatens to fire him. Due to the extreme stress he is experiencing in that moment, Homer has a heart attack and has a near death experience. Homer is taken to the hospital, where Dr. Hibbert informs him and Marge that Homer needs a coronary artery bypass surgery, which will cost $30,000. Hearing this, Homer has another heart attack, and the fee rises to $40,000. Marge and Homer both worry they will not be able to afford the operation. Homer manages to obtain an insurance policy, but has another heart attack as he is signing the contract, which causes the policy to be immediately revoked. He then approaches leaders of various religious communities, hoping they will give him money, without success.

The Simpson family learns Dr. Nick Riviera will perform any operation for $129.95, so they decide to hire him to perform the surgery on Homer. Dr. Nick rents a tape to learn how to perform the surgery, but another program has been recorded over parts of it. In the operating theater, Dr. Nick does not know how to operate on Homer, but Lisa, who has been studying cardiology, calls down instructions from her place in the viewing gallery. The operation is a complete success.

== Production ==
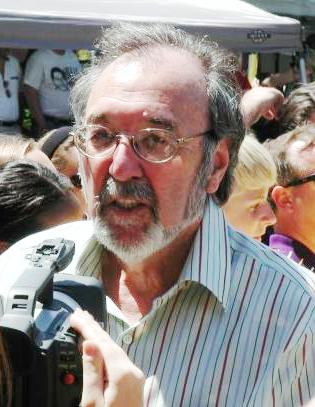
James L. Brooks had the initial idea for the episode, but the subject matter made some writers uncomfortable.

The idea for "Homer's Triple Bypass" was pitched by James L. Brooks. However, the writers disagreed with the choice of such a heavy topic. The episode was not written by a member of the show's regular staff due to the show suffering from a depleted writing team after the third season ended. It was scripted by freelance writers Gary Apple and Michael Carrington, who were hired by Brooks. Carrington would provide voice work for later episodes, such as "I Love Lisa" (as Sideshow Raheem), "Homer and Apu" (as a comedian), and "Simpson Tide" (as Homer's drill instructor). Apple and Carrington decided to have a scene where Lisa and Bart visit Homer before his surgery and were unsure of how to do it, so they approached Brooks, who made up the entire scene on the spot. Originally, the surgery was supposed to be performed by Dr. Hibbert, but it was later changed to Dr. Nick.

The episode's production staff decided that David Silverman would be able to make the episode funny, so he was selected to direct it. He went "all out" and did his best to make Homer's grimaces as humorous as possible, to keep the episode at least somewhat lighter in tone. Silverman added some special touches: for example, when Homer has an out of body experience, his foot was still touching his body to signify that he was not dead. A doctor acted as a medical consultant for the episode.

The episode was to have concluded with Homer eating a pizza in his hospital bed following the operation, and with Marge asking a nurse where the pizza had come from. This reflects the earlier flashback scene where Grampa Simpson watches Homer as an infant, chewing on a slice of pizza in the hospital. Out of concern that it was making light of the unhealthy lifestyle that had caused the infarction, the episode instead concluded with the family visiting Homer while he is recuperating in intensive care.

== Cultural references ==
The opening sequence of the episode is a parody of American reality show Cops; it was not in the original animatic and added later because the episode was too short to fit in its required 22-minute length. When Homer is performing a sock-puppet show to Lisa and Bart, he uses Akbar and Jeff, characters from Matt Groening's weekly comic strip Life in Hell. Homer follows behind the house that was the birthplace of Edgar Allan Poe, which was placed in the episode by David Silverman. During this scene Homer starts to hear a heartbeat, a reference to Poe's "The Telltale Heart". The scene where Homer sings "O Holy Night" in a church as a boy is based on the film Empire of the Sun.

== Reception ==
In its original broadcast, "Homer's Triple Bypass" finished 16th in ratings for the week of December 14–20, 1992, with a Nielsen rating of 14.3, equivalent to approximately 13.2 million viewing households. It was the highest-rated show on the Fox network that week, beating Married... with Children.

Gary Russell and Gareth Roberts, authors of I Can't Believe It's a Bigger and Better Updated Unofficial Simpsons Guide, called it "a cautionary tale that gives Dr Nick his biggest chance to shine." They also praised the "cloud goes up, cloud goes down" line. IGN noted that the episode "introduced fans to one of the show's more endearing background players, Dr. Nick." Krusty's line "this ain't make-up" is one of Matt Groening's favorite lines from the show.

Nathan Rabin writes "A crisis brings out the best in everyone in 'Homer’s Triple Bypass', especially Homer. The episode’s superb writing, voice acting, and animation don’t just make an animated sitcom about a man on the brink of death palatable; the make it consistently hilarious and ultimately quite moving."
