= Simpson Tide =

- The Simpsons episode
- Episode no.: Season 9 Episode 19
- Directed by: Milton Gray
- Written by: Joshua Sternin; Jennifer Ventimilia
- Production code: 3G04
- Original air date: March 29, 1998

Guest appearances
- Rod Steiger as Captain Tenille; Bob Denver as himself; Michael Carrington as Drill Sergeant

Episode features
- Chalkboard gag: "My butt does not deserve a website"
- Couch gag: In a parody of Rocky & Bullwinkle bumpers, the Simpson family falls off a cliff and grow as flowers in the ground.
- Commentary: Al Jean; Mike Reiss

Episode chronology
← Previous "This Little Wiggy"	Next → "The Trouble with Trillions"
- The Simpsons season 9

"Simpson Tide" is the nineteenth episode of the ninth season of the American animated television series The Simpsons. It originally aired on Fox in the United States on March 29, 1998. After being fired from the Springfield Nuclear Power Plant, Homer decides to join the U.S. Naval Reserve. The episode was both the second and last to be written by Joshua Sternin and Jennifer Ventimilia and the final episode directed by Milton Gray.

It guest-starred Rod Steiger as Captain Tenille and Bob Denver as himself, with one-time Simpsons writer Michael Carrington making an appearance as the Drill Sergeant. The episode makes many references to popular culture, especially contemporary culture, with its title and plot elements being derived from the 1995 film Crimson Tide. This was the last episode Jean and Reiss executive produced together.

== Plot ==
After Homer nearly causes the nuclear plant to go into meltdown by putting a doughnut into the reactor core to enlarge it, he is fired by Mr. Burns. While at home he sees a recruitment advertisement on television for the Naval Reserve and decides to enlist, with Moe, Barney, and Apu deciding to join him. Meanwhile, Bart purchases an earring, which an outraged Homer confiscates.

Homer and the others are placed on a nuclear submarine. While participating in a military wargame, Homer unintentionally has the captain fired out of a torpedo tube and pilots the submarine into Russian waters, which is seen by the United States government as an attempt to defect. This event creates a political schism between the United States and Russia, with a Russian representative revealing that the Soviet Union still exists, never dissolved and its fall was a ruse, the Soviet flag blocks the peace flag in the Moscow parade along with several tanks coming out of the props of the parade, several Soviet footsoldiers proceed to march the streets of Moscow, Germany was divided again with the Berlin Wall rising from the ground, and Vladimir Lenin revives and breaks his way out of his casket from his tomb in Moscow.

Nuclear war is anticipated until the US Navy drops depth charges on Homer's submarine, aiming either to destroy it or force it to surface. The consequent explosion causes a pinhole leak in the submarine's hull, but Homer uses Bart's earring to plug the leak and saves the submarine. The vessel surfaces and Homer is taken to be court-martialed, but the officers on the review committee have themselves been indicted on unrelated charges, and Homer's punishment ends up being a mild dishonorable discharge. He immediately forgives Bart, as the earring saved his life.

== Production ==
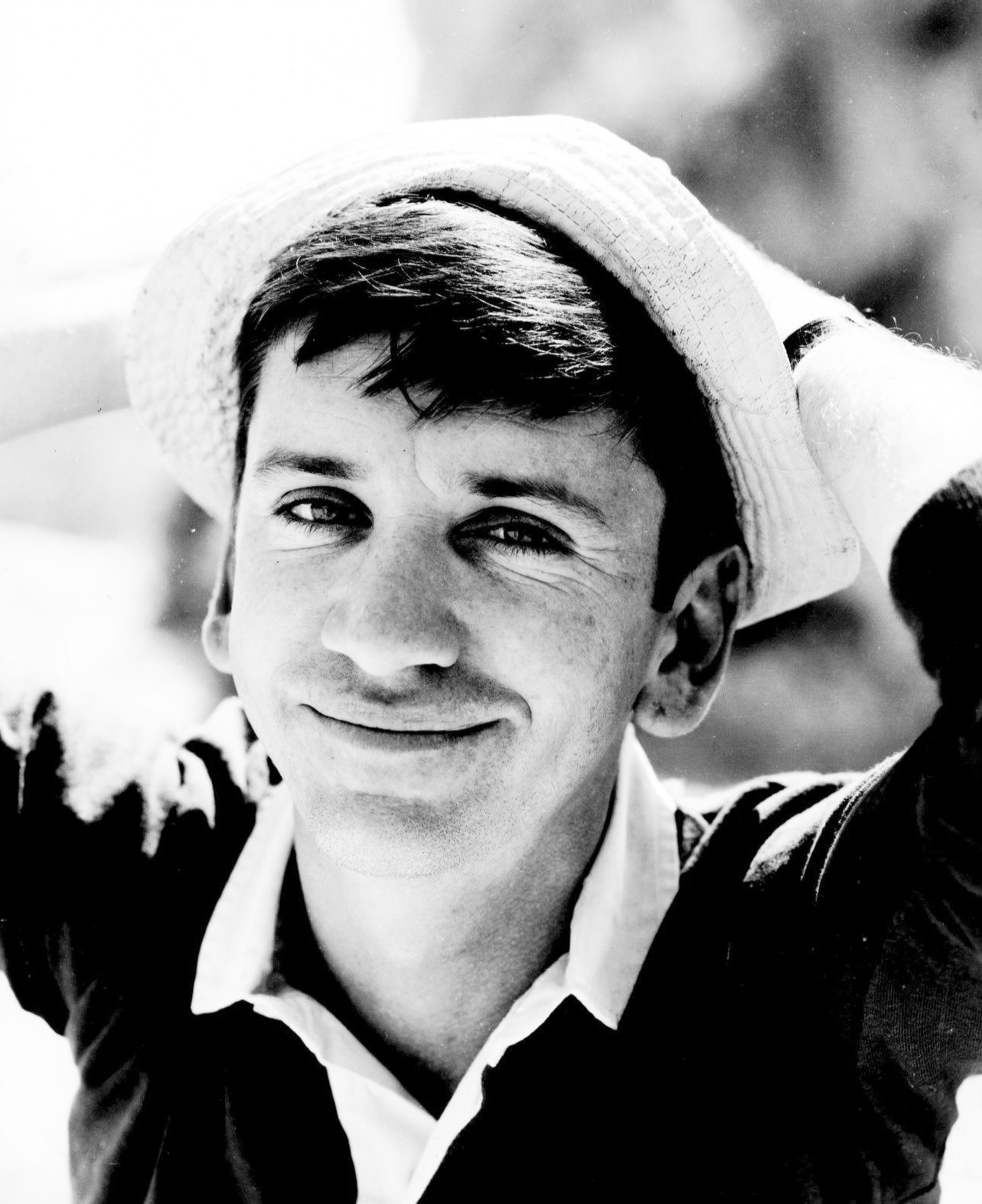
Bob Denver guest stars as himself.

"Simpson Tide" was one of two season nine episodes that was executive produced by Al Jean and Mike Reiss, both of whom were the showrunners for the third and fourth seasons. Although Jean would later return to run the show from season 13, it was the last episode for which Reiss received an executive producer credit. Joshua Sternin and Jennifer Ventimilia, the episode writers, were working on Jean and Reiss's show The Critic at the time, and pitched an episode where Homer joins the Naval Reserve. Although the episode is partially based on the 1995 film Crimson Tide, the original pitch was made before the film was released. After the release of the film, the writers decided to start incorporating elements from the movie in the script. In the original draft, Bart sneaked on board the submarine with Homer. They were trying to do it "for the comedy of it", but could not get the draft to work, so it was cut. It was difficult for them to figure out how to get the captain off of the sub, but they eventually decided to have him shot out of the torpedo tube. In the DVD commentary, Al Jean says that Steiger claimed that he really did get stuck in a torpedo tube once, but this plot device was not related to his experience.

The Navy drill instructor, along with the announcer to "Exploitation Theater", was voiced by Michael Carrington, who had written the season four episode "Homer's Triple Bypass" and voiced Sideshow Raheem in "I Love Lisa" that same season. Bob Denver voices himself in the episode and was directed by Mike Reiss. Rod Steiger guest stars as the captain and was directed by Al Jean.

== Cultural references ==
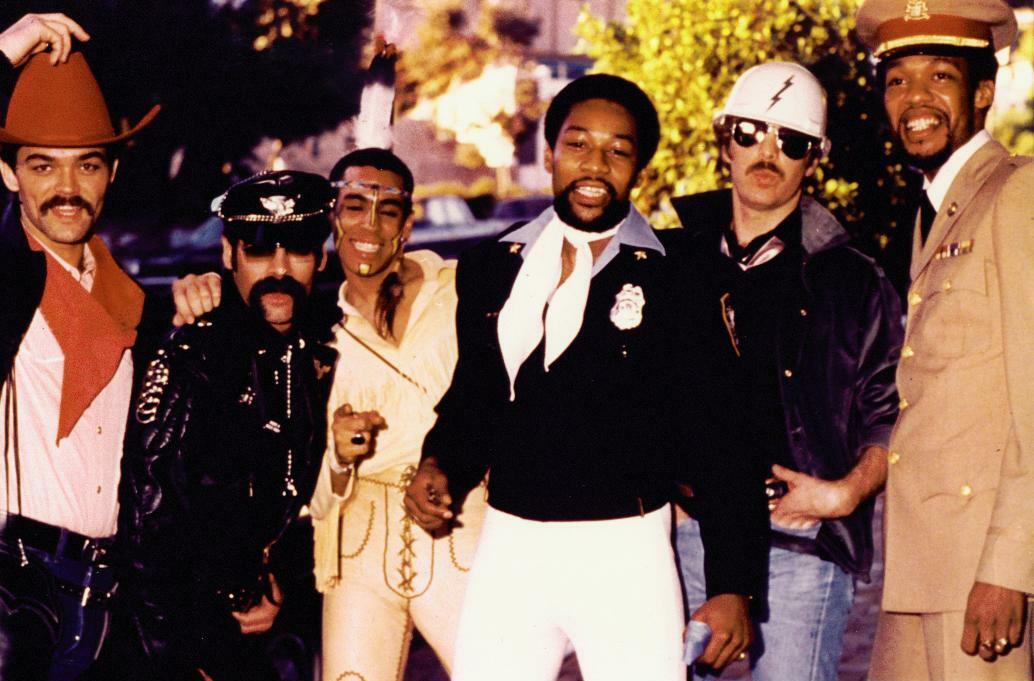
The Village People are portrayed in the episode, dancing to their song "In the Navy"

The couch gag is a recreation of the bumper seen at the end of each Bullwinkle short on The Adventures of Rocky and Bullwinkle and Friends. The music accompanying it is also adapted from the original bumper. In the opening scene, Homer dreams of being on "the planet of the doughnuts" and on a criminal trial similar to that from the film Planet of the Apes.

Many parts of the episode, including the title, refer to the 1995 film Crimson Tide. The Captain of the submarine is based on Gene Hackman's character Captain Frank Ramsey. Homer mentions that he and his friends joining the Navy is similar to The Deer Hunter, and the Russian roulette scene from the film is later parodied. A scene of Homer and the others having their hair shaved off, and the following scenes at a training camp, are inspired by Full Metal Jacket. Right before the submarine submerges, the song "In the Navy" is played and the Village People can be seen dancing. The Captain of the submarine is named Captain Tenille, a reference to the musical duo Captain & Tennille. The character Mr. Sulu, based on the Star Trek character Hikaru Sulu, appears aboard the submarine; he claims to hail from Rigel VII, the home of Kang and Kodos, but also a recurring planet from Trek itself. Grampa claims that he attacked John F. Kennedy on the PT-109 when Kennedy stated "Ich bin ein Berliner", leading to Grampa mistaking Kennedy for a Nazi.

A veteran says that he lost his eye in a drinking accident in Haiti; Operation Uphold Democracy was an American intervention in the Caribbean country in 1994. The naval recruiter refers to the recent passing of "Don't ask, don't tell", and an official on Homer's court martial has been indicted in the Tailhook scandal. In his imagination, Homer exclaims Rodney King's quote "Can't we all just get along?" Homer believes he can switch off his light by clapping, despite not having The Clapper. Bart gets his ear pierced at a mall where every store is converted into a Starbucks; Reiss said that some animators were unaware of the franchise at the time. Moe says that "blended mocha drinks and David Schwimmer" are "in". The USO Tour is headlined by Bob Hope and Cindy Crawford, while the Naval Reserve Tour has Bob Denver and Cindy Williams. Bart sings a portion of "Do the Bartman" from The Simpsons Sing the Blues album, with Ralph Wiggum commenting "That is so 1991".

=== Russia–Ukraine crisis "prediction" ===
In 2014, it was alleged that the episode's Soviet Union revival joke predicted the recent Russian annexation of Crimea from Ukraine. Following the Russian invasion of Ukraine in February 2022, rumors began spreading that the joke also predicted that this war between Russia and Ukraine, both of which were previously part of the Soviet Union, would happen. In an interview with Hollywood Reporter, showrunner Al Jean responded to the prediction rumors by claiming that the gag was "very sad" and that "There is the kind of prediction, where we reference something that has happened, happening again—we hope it wouldn't, but sadly, it does." In addition to the ordering the Russian military invasion of Ukraine, Russian leader Vladimir Putin, who Jean blamed for the rising tensions, has also previously made efforts to intervene in the affairs of other former Soviet republics as well, with another example being 2008 Russian invasion of Georgia.

== Reception ==
In its original broadcast, "Simpson Tide" finished 29th in ratings for the week of March 23–29, 1998, with a Nielsen rating of 9.2, equivalent to approximately 9.0 million viewing households; it was the second highest-rated show on the Fox network that week, following The X-Files.

The episode received mostly positive reviews from critics, and is considered to be one of the best episodes of the season.

Michael Schiffer, one of the writers of Crimson Tide itself, is said to have enjoyed this episode. Mike Reiss considers the sequence where Russia returns to being the Soviet Union to be "the nuttiest the show has ever been". The authors of the book I Can't Believe It's a Bigger and Better Updated Unofficial Simpsons Guide, Warren Martyn and Adrian Wood, called it "a fairly straightforward episode where the biggest laugh comes from Homer being able to talk to penguins and Bart trying to impress his classmates by doing The Bartman."

In his 2015 retrospective review for The A.V. Club, writer Kyle Ryan considered the episode "the most '90s episode" of the series due to its heavy usage of contemporary references. Ryan also said that the episode deserves to be mentioned as part of the show's "golden era": "While it's strange to think of an episode where Homer loses his job, becomes a submarine captain, and causes an international incident as 'tightly written,' it is. The Simpsons excels when it meanders, too, but Sternin and Ventimilia wrote an efficient joke machine of an episode that delivers plenty of laughs with a clean, circular episode structure. You could probably argue it's a little too neat in that way, but when there's a picture of Homer in an ushanka doing a Russian kalinka dance, and Lisa says, 'I told him that photo would come back to haunt him,' who’s going to complain?"
