= Marge in Chains =

- The Simpsons episode
- Episode no.: Season 4 Episode 21
- Directed by: Jim Reardon
- Written by: Bill Oakley; Josh Weinstein
- Production code: 9F20
- Original air date: May 6, 1993

Guest appearances
- David Crosby as himself; Phil Hartman as Lionel Hutz and Troy McClure

Episode features
- Chalkboard gag: "I do not have diplomatic immunity"
- Couch gag: A miniature version of the Simpson family climbs onto a normal-sized couch.
- Commentary: Matt Groening; Al Jean; Bill Oakley; Josh Weinstein; Jim Reardon; Jeffrey Lynch

Episode chronology
← Previous "Whacking Day"	Next → "Krusty Gets Kancelled"
- The Simpsons season 4

"Marge in Chains" is the twenty-first and penultimate episode of the fourth season of the American animated television series The Simpsons. It originally aired on Fox in the United States on May 6, 1993. In the episode, an exhausted Marge is arrested for shoplifting after forgetting to pay for an item at the Kwik-E-Mart. The family hires attorney Lionel Hutz to defend her at trial, but she is found guilty and sentenced to 30 days in prison. Homer and the rest of the family have trouble coping without Marge.

The episode was written by Bill Oakley and Josh Weinstein, and directed by Jim Reardon. After its initial airing on Fox, the episode was later included as part of a 1997 video release titled The Simpsons: Crime and Punishment. It was released again on the 2005 edition of the same set.

"Marge in Chains" received a positive reception from television critics. The authors of I Can't Believe It's a Bigger and Better Updated Unofficial Simpsons Guide commented positively on the episode, as did reviews in The Daily Mirror and The Observer.

== Plot ==
Troy McClure and Dr. Nick star in a TV advertisement for a juicer called the "Juice Loosener", which is manufactured in and shipped from Osaka, Japan. The advertisement persuades multiple Springfield residents to buy Juice Looseners. However, one of the packers in Osaka has the flu and every package contains some of his germs. The "Osaka Flu" spreads through Springfield.

Every member of the Simpson family catches the flu, except Marge, who quickly becomes exhausted by caring for four family members. On a trip to the Kwik-E-Mart, Marge's exhaustion causes her to forget to pay for a bottle of bourbon that Grampa requested, and she is soon charged with shoplifting. Mayor Quimby dramatically reveals Marge's shoplifting to the town in a public address. Marge's reputation is damaged and the townspeople no longer trust her. The Simpson family hires Lionel Hutz to defend Marge, but due to Hutz's incompetence, Marge is convicted and sentenced to 30 days in prison.

Marge's absence is felt by the family and the house falls into disarray. The annual bake sale also suffers– without Marge's marshmallow squares, the Springfield Park Commission is short the money needed for a statue of Abraham Lincoln; they instead purchase a statue of Jimmy Carter. The townspeople are enraged by this (one person shouts, "He's history's greatest monster!") and riot. To save the town government's reputation, Quimby arranges for Marge to be released from jail early. When Marge arrives home, several townspeople are gathered in her front yard. Quimby unveils the Carter statue again, but it now has Marge's hairstyle, and the inscription has been changed from "Malaise Forever" to "Marge Forever". The statue is then converted into a tetherball post, which Bart and Lisa play with.

== Production ==
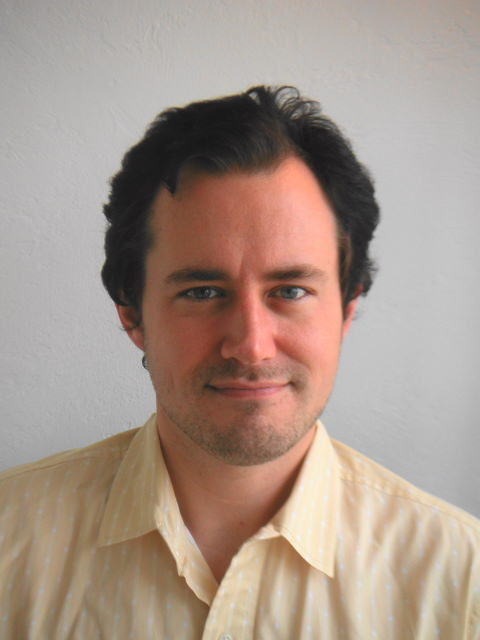
Bill Oakley (pictured in 2008), was one of the two writers of the episode alongside Josh Weinstein.

"Marge in Chains" was the first episode that Bill Oakley and Josh Weinstein wrote as staff writers. The script was assigned to them after somebody else had come up with the idea. The first draft of the script was "slightly more realistic" than the final version of the episode because Oakley and Weinstein had done a lot of research about women in prison, much of which was later replaced. For Apu and Sanjay's brief lines of Hindi dialogue, the writers called the Embassy of India in Washington to get them to translate. The Embassy was not "interested or happy" but still did it.

In the episode, Jimmy Carter is referred to as "history's greatest monster". In the 2004 Season 4 DVD commentary for this episode, show runner Al Jean said that he did not like Carter, although he would vote for him ahead of George W. Bush. According to fellow show runner Mike Reiss, one of Carter's grandsons had recommended that Carter watch The Simpsons, and this was the first episode he saw. Kwik-E-Mart operator Apu testifies in a courtroom scene in the episode that he is able to recite pi to 40,000 decimal places, correctly noting that the 40,000th digit is the number one. The episode's writers prepared for this scene by asking David H. Bailey of the National Aeronautics and Space Administration (now at Lawrence Berkeley National Laboratory) for the number of the 40,000th decimal place of pi. Bailey sent them back a printout of the first 40,000 digits. The Troy McClure movie title P is for Psycho is Reiss' favorite joke he ever wrote for The Simpsons.

"Marge in Chains" originally aired on the Fox network in the United States on May 6, 1993. The episode was selected for release in a 1997 video collection of selected episodes titled: The Simpsons: Crime and Punishment. Other episodes included in the set were "Homer the Vigilante", "Bart the Fink", and "You Only Move Twice". It was included again in the 2005 DVD release of the Crime and Punishment set. "Marge in Chains" is also featured on The Simpsons' season 4 DVD set, The Simpsons – The Complete Fourth Season, which was released on June 15, 2004.

== Cultural references ==
The episode's title is a reference to the Seattle grunge band Alice in Chains. Bart requests Flintstones Chewable Morphine. When addressing Springfield's residents, Mayor Quimby gives away the plot twist of The Crying Game (1992). The scene of Maude watching Marge in the bathroom is modeled after a similar scene in Alfred Hitchcock's Psycho (1960). David Crosby plays himself as Lionel Hutz's Alcoholics Anonymous sponsor. Nathan Rabin writes that "This is a bit of an in-joke, because the great Phil Hartman, the voice and smarmy soul of Lionel Hutz and so many others, designed an album cover for Crosby, Stills, and Nash back in the 1970s." Their song "Teach Your Children" is referenced when Crosby tells Hutz, "and know that I love you." During Marge's trial, prosecutors show the Zapruder film and assert that Marge was present on the grassy knoll when President John F. Kennedy was assassinated. In Lionel Hutz's dream of what the world would be like without lawyers, the writers had wanted to use the song "I'd Like to Teach the World to Sing", which was used in Coca-Cola advertisements, but they could not get the rights to it. Instead, they used a similar instrumental theme. Homer complains that "I'll miss Sheriff Lobo". Maude asks why God has forsaken the Flanders, and Ned recalls that he laughed at an off-color joke on the Fox sitcom Married... with Children. He laments: “Oh, the network slogan is true! Watch Fox and be damned for all eternity!” The inscription on the Carter statue, "Malaise Forever", is a reference to Carter's "Crisis of Confidence" speech, often referred to as the "malaise" speech, although Carter never used the word.

=== COVID-19 "predictions" ===
During the COVID-19 pandemic, media outlets reported that The Simpsons had "predicted" the outbreak with this episode. Episode writer Bill Oakley alleged that Internet trolls were using the episode for "nefarious purposes", including creating memes replacing "Osaka flu" with "coronavirus." Oakley stated his reference for the "Osaka" plot device was the 1968 flu pandemic, which began in British Hong Kong, stating it was "just supposed to be a quick joke about how the flu got here." When speaking on "predictions" from The Simpsons in general, Oakley continued "It's mainly just coincidence because the episodes are so old that history repeats itself."

Comparisons to the episode experienced a resurgence in May 2020, following advisories by Washington state regarding Asian giant hornets in the region, citing a scene where an angry crowd tips over a truck they believed contained a "placebo" for Osaka flu, and accidentally unleashing a swarm of killer bees from a crate in the process. In real life, killer bees were the subject of much media attention in the United States in the late 1980s and early 1990s.

In this episode, Mayor Quimby pretends to be in his office, while actually he is in the Caribbean on vacation. This was likened to many politicians who violated their own "stay-at-home" orders during the pandemic, as well as Ted Cruz allegedly abandoning his constituents during the 2021 Texas power crisis to flee to Cancún. However, even before this incident occurred, Cruz has had a history of openly acknowledging that he is a Simpsons fan.

== Reception ==
In its original broadcast, "Marge in Chains" finished 31st in ratings for the week of May 3–9, 1993, with a Nielsen rating of 11.1, equivalent to approximately 10.3 million viewing households. It was the second highest-rated show on the Fox network that week, following Beverly Hills, 90210.

In a review of the episode in The Observer, Caroline Boucher wrote: "My domestic Simpsons correspondent, Simon, reports a particularly fine episode, Marge in Chains to the extent that he watched the tape twice." Karl French of Financial Times characterized the plot of the episode as a "modern version" of It's a Wonderful Life. Dusty Lane of The News Tribune cited a quote from Lionel Hutz in the episode among his list of "Eight Great 'Simpsons' Quotes" – "Well, he's had it in for me since I kinda ran over his dog. Well, replace the word 'kinda' with the word 'repeatedly,' and the word 'dog' with 'son'."

Jessica Mellor of The Daily Mirror highlighted the episode in a review of The Simpsons season four DVD release, along with "Kamp Krusty", "New Kid on the Block", and "I Love Lisa", commenting: "Springfield's finest prove once again why they are the cleverest thing on telly." In a section on the episode in their book I Can't Believe It's a Bigger and Better Updated Unofficial Simpsons Guide, Gary Russell and Gareth Roberts, wrote: "We like Bart's plan to rescue Marge from prison by becoming the glamorous Bartina, and Lionel Hutz is supremely inept".

== See also ==
- "Orange Is the New Yellow" (2016)
