= Smoking monkey =

Novelty item

A smoking monkey is a novelty item in the form of a 2-inch plastic monkey. When a speciality cigarette is inserted into the monkey's mouth and lit the figure gives the impression it's smoking. The cigarettes do not contain any tobacco.

== In popular culture ==
In The Simpsons fourth season episode Marge in Chains unscrupulous attorney Lionel Hutz offers Homer Simpson and his wife Marge a smoking monkey if they hire him. It's also revealed he keeps a drawer full of them in his desk.

The Jonathan Coulton album "Smoking Monkey" is named after the item, and features one on the album's cover.
