= Duffless =

- The Simpsons episode
- Episode no.: Season 4 Episode 16
- Directed by: Jim Reardon
- Written by: David M. Stern
- Production code: 9F14
- Original air date: February 18, 1993

Guest appearances
- Phil Hartman as Lionel Hutz and Troy McClure; Marcia Wallace as Edna Krabappel; Kipp Lennon singing "Raindrops Keep Fallin' on My Head"

Episode features
- Chalkboard gag: "Goldfish don't bounce"
- Couch gag: Maggie is seated as the rest of the family "overshoot the mark" and run past the edge of the film and return to the couch.
- Commentary: Matt Groening; Al Jean; Mike Reiss; David M. Stern; Jim Reardon

Episode chronology
← Previous "I Love Lisa"	Next → "Last Exit to Springfield"
- The Simpsons season 4

"Duffless" is the sixteenth episode of the fourth season of the American animated television series The Simpsons. It originally aired on Fox in the United States on February 18, 1993. Homer gets arrested for drunk driving, and Marge asks him to stop drinking beer for a month. Meanwhile, after Bart ruins Lisa's science fair project, she attempts to get revenge by proving that he is "dumber than a hamster".

The episode was written by David M. Stern, and directed by Jim Reardon. It had a positive reception.

== Plot ==
Homer sneaks out early at the Springfield Nuclear Power Plant and accompanies Barney on a tour of the Duff brewery. Afterward, Homer refuses to let a drunk Barney drive home and forces him to hand over his keys. On their way out of the parking lot, their car is pulled over by police Chief Wiggum, along with Eddie and Lou. After administering a field sobriety test on Homer, which he passes, the policemen tell Homer he is free to go. However, as revenge for not being allowed to drive, Barney tells the policemen to give Homer a breathalyzer, which detects that Homer has recently had alcohol. Homer is arrested, loses his license, and is ordered by a judge to attend traffic school and Alcoholics Anonymous meetings.

In bed, Marge gives Homer a magazine quiz about his drinking, and asks him to give up beer for a month. During the month that Homer spends without beer, he loses weight and saves over $100, but becomes tempted many times, confessing during an AA meeting that he ate dirt from the football stadium to fight his urge to drink, causing a furious Reverend Lovejoy to expel him from the group. After being sober for a month, Homer goes back to Moe's, despite Marge's declaration that she would like to spend time with him in that moment. Homer orders a beer at Moe's, but thinks about what Marge said to him and leaves without drinking the beer after a steady, appraising look at Barney and the other barflies. Homer and Marge ride a bike into the sunset, singing "Raindrops Keep Fallin' on My Head".

While having breakfast with her family, Lisa shows them her project for Springfield Elementary School's upcoming science fair, a gigantic steroid-enhanced tomato she hopes will solve world hunger. At school, three days before the fair, Lisa leaves her tomato in Bart's care for a moment and he hurls it at Principal Skinner's butt. Furious that Bart destroyed her project, Lisa asks Marge for help, who suggests she run a hamster through a maze. Inspired, Lisa decides to run a series of tests on a hamster and Bart to determine who is smarter. After two easy tests, the hamster leads two to zero. Bart discovers Lisa's plans to humiliate him at the science fair and pre-empts her project with a project of his own, "Can hamsters fly planes?", showing her hamster in the cockpit of a miniature plane. Despite Lisa's objection concerning the lack of scientific merit, everyone is distracted by how cute the hamster is, and a proud Skinner hands Bart the first place ribbon.

== Production ==
Bart's go-go ray idea was "stolen" from the opening credits of Jonny Quest. Mike Reiss said they did not want to show the hamster getting shocked but had to for plot purposes. The first line Richard Nixon says, during the Duff commercial, was taken verbatim from the Kennedy–Nixon Debate during the 1960 Presidential Campaign. Adolf Hitler's head, among other things, can be seen going by in bottles of Duff when the quality control man is not paying attention. The Troy McClure driver's education film title Alice's Adventures Through the Windshield Glass was pitched by Frank Mula.

The episode contains the first appearance of Sarah Wiggum. The episode also contains a two-second snippet of footage from "Bart the Daredevil": a close-up of Homer making a disappointed face and saying "D'oh!" when he gets arrested.

== Reception ==
"Duffless" aired during February sweeps and finished 19th in the weekly ratings for the week of February 15–21, 1993, with a Nielsen rating of 15.2 and was viewed in 14.2 million homes. It was the highest-rated show from the Fox Network that week. Gary Russell and Gareth Roberts, called it "A superb episode with a sincere message. Homer is excellent throughout, but it is the cameos by Principal Skinner and Edna Krabappel that steal the show, especially the latter's reaction to Milhouse's Slinky." Nathan Rabin writes: "'Duffless' flirts with a truly downbeat ending ... it was awfully ballsy for an animated family sitcom in 1993 to make an entire episode around a lead character’s alcoholism and drunk-driving conviction[,] so the show can be forgiven for not being quite as uncompromising in its depiction of Homer’s alcoholism as it could be."

Entertainment Weekly ranked the episode eleventh on their list of the top twenty-five The Simpsons episodes: "Not only does 'Duffless' tweak an unrelenting alcohol culture (a billboard flips between 'Friends Don’t Let Friends Drive Drunk' and 'It’s Always Time for Duff'), it deftly depicts poignant, if grudging, emotional growth for Homer: After bemoaning his newfound sobriety at a baseball stadium ('I never realized how boring this game is'), he forgoes a reward beer to bike into the sunset with Marge." Reviewing the season in 1993, Ken Tucker wrote that "the closest the series has ever come to offering a 'message' has been in a few episodes this season that mercilessly satirize the alcohol industry in the form of the profoundly cynical 'Duff' beer company...the show has Homer trying to give up Duff for a month, with great difficulty. The episode is hilarious, in part because it makes alcoholism seem like such an absurd horror, you have to laugh."

== Cultural References ==
When Homer reminisces on his teenage drinking, he changes "When I was seventeen, it was a very good year" to "When I was seventeen, I drank some very good beer." He goes on, "I stayed up listening to Queen."

Martin Prince builds a hot air balloon for the science fair; he dresses up as Phileas Fogg from Around the World in Eighty Days.

Principle Skinner states: "every good scientists is half B. F. Skinner and half P. T. Barnum," in reference to their behaviourist experiments and hoaxes respectively.

When a train passes in front of Homer, it makes a repeating "chug-a-lug" sound, in reference to the Roger Miller song which itself is about youthful drinking.

When Homer and Marge ride into the sunset, they sing "Raindrops Keep Fallin' on My Head".

When Homer leaves the bar, Moe says "You'll be back, and you, and you" then pointing at the viewer. This is a reference to the Government led social panic film "Reefer Madness".
