= Treehouse of Horror III =

- The Simpsons episode
- Promotional poster
- Episode no.: Season 4 Episode 5
- Directed by: Carlos Baeza
- Written by: "Clown Without Pity": Al Jean; Mike Reiss; "King Homer": Jay Kogen; Wallace Wolodarsky; "Dial "Z" for Zombies": Sam Simon; Jon Vitti
- Production code: 9F04
- Original air date: October 29, 1992

Guest appearance
- Marcia Wallace as Edna Krabappel

Episode features
- Couch gag: The family's skeletons walk in and sit on the couch.
- Commentary: Matt Groening; Al Jean; Jay Kogen; Wallace Wolodarsky; Jon Vitti

Episode chronology
← Previous "Lisa the Beauty Queen"	Next → "Itchy & Scratchy: The Movie"
- The Simpsons season 4

"Treehouse of Horror III" is the fifth episode of the fourth season of the American animated television series The Simpsons. It originally aired on Fox in the United States on October 29, 1992. The third annual Treehouse of Horror episode, it features segments in which Homer buys Bart an evil talking doll, Homer is a giant ape who is captured by Mr. Burns in a parody of the 1933 version of King Kong, and Bart and Lisa inadvertently cause zombies to attack Springfield.

The episode was written by Al Jean, Mike Reiss, Jay Kogen, Wallace Wolodarsky, Sam Simon, and Jon Vitti, and directed by Carlos Baeza.

== Plot ==
The episode's wraparound segment shows the Simpson family having a Halloween party for the children of Springfield. Lisa, Grampa, and Bart each tell a horror story.

=== "Clown Without Pity" ===
In Lisa's story, "Clown Without Pity", Homer buys a cursed Krusty the Clown doll as a last-minute birthday present for Bart. After the doll makes numerous attempts on Homer's life, he captures the doll, locks it in a suitcase, and drops it in a "Bottomless Pit". Returning home, Homer is ambushed by the escaped doll, who tackles him into the kitchen and tries to drown him in a dog bowl. Marge calls the consumer service hotline. A repairman arrives and discovers that the doll has been set to "evil" mode. He flips the switch to "good" and the Krusty doll becomes friends with Homer, although it is quickly put to work as Homer's slave.

=== "King Homer" ===
In Grampa's story, "King Homer", inspired by Grampa watching lots of movies, Marge joins Mr. Burns and Mr. Smithers on an expedition to Ape Island as bait for the legendary giant ape King Homer in 1936. The natives of Ape Island capture Marge and tie her to a post as an offering for King Homer, who is summoned by the sound of drums. Marge is initially terrified but sees the friendly side of Homer, and the two form a friendship. Nonetheless, Mr. Burns is determined to capture King Homer and Smithers knocks Homer unconscious with a gas bomb. Returning to Springfield, the group display King Homer at a theater. The photographers' flashes enrage King Homer, who breaks free from his restraints. He abducts Marge and attempts to climb a skyscraper, but is unable to get past the second story of the building and collapses in exhaustion. In the end, King Homer and Marge get married.

=== "Dial 'Z' for Zombies" ===
In Bart's story, "Dial 'Z' for Zombies", Bart finds a book of black magic in Springfield Elementary Library when he is asked to write a book report for class. That night, he tries to resurrect the family's dead cat, Snowball I, but accidentally reanimates corpses from the nearby human cemetery instead. The zombies terrorize Springfield, turning many people into zombies. Aided by Homer wielding a shotgun, Lisa and Bart find a book at the library to cast the appropriate counter-spell, causing all of the zombies to return to their graves. Some time later, as the Simpson family watches TV together, Marge remarks that she is grateful that no one in the family was turned into a zombie, not acknowledging that the family members are behaving in a zombie-like way as they react to the TV show they are watching.

== Production ==
This episode originally encountered trouble when the color version came back from South Korea. With only six weeks to the airdate, the writers made almost one hundred line changes, a very rare occurrence. It was decided to completely overhaul the episode after a poorly received screening with the writing staff. The tombstones that appeared at the start of and during the episode were abandoned in later episodes because it was becoming increasingly difficult to think of ideas. A subtle tombstone joke in this episode is in the scene where two zombies are crawling out of their graves. The names Jay Kogen and Wolodarsky (two of The Simpsons writers who worked on the episode) are written on the tombstones, but both are misspelled.

The "King Homer" segment is one of Matt Groening's all-time favorite stories from the Treehouse of Horror series. Al Jean was also quite worried about this segment because it was the longest running black-and-white segment they had ever aired, and he thought that some people might be concerned that their televisions were broken. The "He was a zombie?" line, created by Mike Reiss, is, in the opinions of the writers, one of the all-time classic lines from the series.

== Cultural references ==
Homer standing in Alfred Hitchcock's famous silhouette

The opening sequence where Homer walks into Alfred Hitchcock's silhouette is a parody of Alfred Hitchcock Presents, complete with Gounod's Funeral March of a Marionette. Homer's stomach is bigger than that of the silhouette, but this was so subtle that not many people got the joke. Buckminster Fuller's tombstone can be seen in the Springfield Cemetery; it is adorned with a geodesic dome. In the episode's wraparounds, Bart is dressed as Alex from A Clockwork Orange (1971).

The "Clown Without Pity" segment is based on the Twilight Zone episode "Living Doll" and the film Trilogy of Terror. The title itself is a play on the song "Town Without Pity", written for the movie of the same name and performed by Gene Pitney. The man that sells Homer the Krusty doll is based on Mr. Wing from Gremlins (1984). The song Homer sings in the bathtub is a variation of the Oscar Mayer song with the letters spelling out his name instead of "O-S-C-A-R". Bernard Herrmann's music from Psycho is heard as the Krusty doll chases Homer. The Krusty doll riding under Homer's car is a reference to the 1991 film Cape Fear. The song Marge hears while put on hold after calling the Krusty doll hotline is "Everybody Loves a Clown" by Gary Lewis & the Playboys. A brief parody of the Love, American Style theme plays at the end of "Clown Without Pity" and again at the end of "King Homer".

The "King Homer" segment is a parody of the 1933 film King Kong. When the classified ad Marge has responded to is shown, what is visible of the ad above it reads, "you like pina coladas, getting caught in the rain? Come with me and escape." This is a reference to the Rupert Holmes song "Escape (The Piña Colada Song)". The tribal leader is heard saying "Mosi Tatupu, Mosi Tatupu", which the subtitles inform us means "We will sacrifice the blue-haired lady." The scene of King Homer on Broadway is based on Young Frankenstein (1974). During his rampage, he spots Shirley Temple singing "On the Good Ship Lollipop", and ends up eating her. Mr. Burns says "I remember when Al Jolson ran amok at the Winter Garden and climbed the Chrysler Building."

The title "Dial "Z" for Zombies" is a play on the title of the 1954 Hitchcock film Dial M for Murder. It parodies Night of the Living Dead, Return of the Living Dead, and Pet Sematary. In the pet cemetery, there are tombstones that read Fish Police, Capitol Critters and Family Dog, each a short-lived animated series intended to capitalize on The Simpsons' success. When casting the spell, Bart wears the album cover of Michael Jackson's Thriller on his head. This is a reference to Jackson's famous music video, in which he dances with zombies. As Zombie William Shakespeare is dying he says “Is this the end of Zombie Shakespeare?”, which is a reference to the line from Little Caesar “Mother of mercy, is this the end of Rico?” Homer's weapon of choice for "Dial "Z" for Zombies", a sawn-off Winchester Model 1887 lever-action shotgun; is a reference to Terminator 2: Judgment Day and the scene where Homer guns down zombies in the hallway of Springfield Elementary's library is a direct reference to the Terminator's first battle with the T-1000.

== Reception ==
In its original broadcast, "Treehouse of Horror III" finished 20th in ratings for the week of October 26 – November 1, 1992, with a Nielsen rating of 14.7, equivalent to approximately 13.7 million viewing households. It was the highest-rated show on the Fox network that week, beating In Living Color. Gary Russell and Gareth Roberts, the authors of the book I Can't Believe It's a Bigger and Better Updated Unofficial Simpsons Guide, thoroughly enjoyed the episode. They described the episode as "Another seasonal treat. Dial Z for Zombies is particularly impressive ('Die, you freak!' 'Dad, you killed the zombie Flanders!' 'He was a zombie?')." In 2006, IGN voted "Dial Z For Zombies" as the second best segment of the Treehouse of Horror episodes. "Clown Without Pity" was also rated sixth.

In the film 28 Days Later (2002), there is a scene where Sgt. Ferrell mentions that his favorite joke from The Simpsons was the line "Women and seamen (semen) don't mix", said by Smithers during the "King Homer" segment. The episode's reference to Night of the Living Dead was named the 16th greatest film reference in the history of the show by Total Film's Nathan Ditum.
