= Lisa the Beauty Queen =

- The Simpsons episode
- Episode no.: Season 4 Episode 4
- Directed by: Mark Kirkland
- Written by: Jeff Martin
- Production code: 9F02
- Original air date: October 15, 1992

Guest appearances
- Bob Hope as himself; Lona Williams as Amber Dempsey

Episode features
- Chalkboard gag: "I will not prescribe medication"
- Couch gag: Maggie appears on the couch first. Homer, Marge, and Bart run by but end up on the empty white space of the film frame. They scramble back and Lisa comes in at the last minute.
- Commentary: Matt Groening; Al Jean; Jeff Martin; Mark Kirkland

Episode chronology
← Previous "Homer the Heretic"	Next → "Treehouse of Horror III"
- The Simpsons season 4

"Lisa the Beauty Queen" is the fourth episode of the fourth season of the American animated television series The Simpsons. It first aired on Fox in the United States on October 15, 1992. In the episode, Homer enters Lisa into a beauty pageant to boost her confidence. Lisa is runner-up, but gains the title of Little Miss Springfield after the original winner is injured. Little Miss Springfield's duties include being a spokesperson for Laramie Cigarettes, which causes Lisa to speak out against smoking. As a result of her anti-smoking protests, her title is taken away on a technicality.

Jeff Martin wrote the episode and its accompanying songs and music. The episode was directed by Mark Kirkland, and Bob Hope made a guest appearance. The episode references various films, music, and historical events and was well received by critics.

== Plot ==
At a carnival held at Springfield Elementary School, Lisa gets a caricature of herself drawn, but the caricature is unflattering and causes the other carnival patrons to laugh, leading Lisa to assume she is ugly. Meanwhile, Homer wins a ticket to ride in the Duff Blimp at a raffle the carnival is holding.

When the family gets home, Lisa cries over her perceived ugliness, and Homer tries to cheer her up, to no avail. Homer goes to Moe's Tavern and sees a commercial for the "Little Miss Springfield" beauty pageant. Homer decides to enter Lisa in the pageant to boost her self-esteem. Lisa is reluctant to compete in the pageant until Marge tells her that Homer sold his ticket to ride in the Duff Blimp so he would have enough money to pay the pageant's entry fee. Realizing her father's sacrifice, Lisa enters the pageant.

At the pageant's registration, Lisa meets a formidable competitor named Amber Dempsey, who has won more beauty pageants than any other girl at the registration. In preparation for the pageant, Lisa receives makeovers at the beauty parlor and encouragement from her family. The day of the pageant arrives, and onstage Lisa explains her aim to make Springfield a better place, and her talent is a jazzy medley of "America the Beautiful" and "Proud Mary", while Amber wins the crowd's adoration by batting her large eyelashes. After Krusty the Clown's interview segment, Amber is announced as the winner with Lisa the runner-up. At Amber's first public appearance as Little Miss Springfield, a lightning bolt strikes her metal scepter. She is hospitalized for her injuries, and Lisa is crowned Little Miss Springfield.

One of Little Miss Springfield's duties as spokesperson for pageant sponsor Laramie Cigarettes is to lure a younger demographic into smoking. Instead, Lisa protests against the dangers of cigarettes at her public appearances, and also vows to target the corruption of Mayor Quimby. Quimby and the Laramie executives look for a way to dethrone and silence Lisa. They find a technical error on her entry form: Homer wrote "OK" in the box marked "Do not write in this space". As Amber is recrowned Little Miss Springfield, Homer is upset that he cost Lisa her title, but Lisa reminds Homer that he entered her in the pageant to help her self-esteem, and thanks him because it worked.

== Production ==
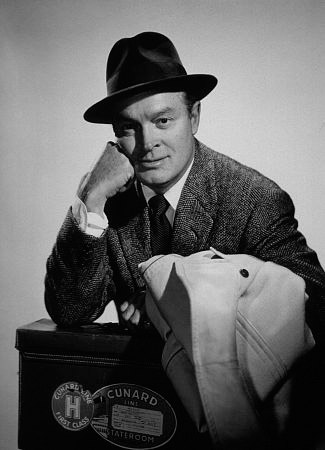
Bob Hope appeared in this episode

Many of The Simpsons' writers had left the show or were absent at the beginning of season four, which left Al Jean and Mike Reiss to brainstorm plot ideas alone. After brainstorming "Homer the Heretic", they thought of Lisa entering a beauty pageant. They assigned Jeff Martin to write the episode because they assumed he would fill it with songs, like he had done on previous episodes. Martin obliged, and wrote the episode and its music. He also based the episode on some of his own experiences, such as the scene where Lisa has a caricature of herself drawn. Regarding the topic, Martin stated, "I'm not sure if we could do this episode today. People had a more innocent view of child beauty pageants before JonBenet Ramsey." According to Reiss, the pitch session of the joke on how Homer got Lisa disqualified took longer than any session he could remember, with Frank Mula eventually pitching the winning gag.

This episode featured then-89-year-old Bob Hope as a guest star, with his part recorded at his house by screenwriters Jeff Martin and Conan O'Brien. His appearance is based on his younger, Vietnam War-era self.

== Cultural references ==
The episode makes two references to Star Wars; the caricature artist displays a caricature of Darth Vader and a montage shows Lisa with a double-bun hairdo like Princess Leia. At the beginning, the Blue Haired Lawyer, representing Disney, threatens to sue Seymour Skinner for copyright infringement for Skinner's use of the phrase "The happiest place on earth" (the slogan of Disneyland) at Springfield Elementary School's carnival. This is a reference to when Disney sued three day-cares in 1989 for having up paintings of characters. After Homer wins the blimp ride ticket, he sings, "Hey there, Blimpy Boy / Flying through the sky so fancy free," a parody of the 1966 pop/folk song "Georgy Girl". Bart recreates the iconic pin-up photo of Betty Grable. When Barney crashes the Duff Blimp the pose it takes makes reference to the Hindenburg disaster. Kent Brockman says “Oh the humanity!”, first uttered by Herbert Morrison as he watched the Hindenburg crash and burn. Laramie's mascot Menthol Moose is a parody of Joe Camel. When Lisa is sworn in as Little Miss Springfield on her front lawn, Marge is to her left wearing a pink suit-dress in a pose similar to that of Jacqueline Kennedy in the famous photo of Lyndon B. Johnson being sworn in on Air Force One after John F. Kennedy's assassination. The evacuation of Lisa and Bob Hope from the USO show is a reference to Apocalypse Now (1979). Apu's niece performs "MacArthur Park" on the tabla. When Krusty mentions how the runner-up would take the winner's place if anything happened to her, he says, "And don't say it'll never happen, because we all remember that thing with what's-her-name, click-click (making camera gestures), you know", a reference to the Vanessa Williams 1984 Miss America scandal.

== Reception ==
The episode finished 28th in the Nielsen ratings for the week of October 12–18, 1992 with a rating of 12.0, seen by approximately 11.1 million households.

The authors of the book I Can't Believe It's a Bigger and Better Updated Unofficial Simpsons Guide, Gary Russell and Gareth Roberts, said: "Another top-notch episode" and adds that "Krusty gets some of his best lines in a few brief appearances." The episode's reference to Apocalypse Now was named the 29th greatest film reference in the history of the show by Total Film's Nathan Ditum.

=== Legacy ===
The Church of England's book Mixing it up with The Simpsons, which encourages children to reflect on life issues, explores self-image through "Lisa the Beauty Queen".
