= Mr. Plow =

- The Simpsons episode
- Promotional artwork for the episode, featuring Barney Gumble, Homer Simpson, Linda Ronstadt and Adam West.
- Episode no.: Season 4 Episode 9
- Directed by: Jim Reardon
- Written by: Jon Vitti
- Production code: 9F07
- Original air date: November 19, 1992

Guest appearances
- Adam West as himself; Linda Ronstadt as herself; Phil Hartman as Troy McClure

Episode features
- Chalkboard gag: "A burp is not an answer"
- Couch gag: The family runs in and sits on a small wooden chair.
- Commentary: Matt Groening; Al Jean; Jon Vitti; Jim Reardon

Episode chronology
← Previous "New Kid on the Block"	Next → "Lisa's First Word"
- The Simpsons season 4

"Mr. Plow" is the ninth episode of the fourth season of the American animated television series The Simpsons. It originally aired on Fox in the United States on November 19, 1992. In the episode, Homer buys a snowplow and starts a business plowing driveways as "Mr. Plow". It is a huge success and, inspired by this, Barney Gumble starts a rival company as the "Plow King" and quickly puts Homer out of business.

The episode was written by Jon Vitti and directed by Jim Reardon. The episode was well received, with some critics calling it one of the best in the show's history.

Dan Castellaneta won his second consecutive Emmy Award for "Outstanding Voice-Over Performance" for this episode (Castellaneta performs the voice of both Homer and Barney in the series). The episode was also submitted in the "Outstanding Comedy Series" category although ultimately it was not nominated.

== Plot ==
After crashing into Marge's car on a snowy night, Homer has to purchase a replacement car. The Simpsons go to a car show where a salesman convinces Homer to buy a pickup truck mounted with a snowplow by saying Homer can make the payments by plowing people's driveways. Homer starts a plowing business called Mr. Plow but has trouble finding customers until Lisa suggests recording a commercial and airing it on public television. The resulting commercial attracts many customers and the business becomes highly successful. Homer is given the key to the city in recognition of his service.

Barney, envious of Homer's success, starts a rival business called Plow King. Barney advertises his business with a commercial featuring a jingle sung by Linda Ronstadt. Homer pays an agency to make him a new commercial, but the new commercial is perplexing and does not sufficiently advertise Homer's business. As a result, Barney becomes much more successful than Homer. Mayor Quimby revokes Homer's key to the city and gives it to Barney.

To get revenge on Barney and revitalize his own business, Homer tricks Barney into plowing a non-existent driveway on Widow's Peak, a large, treacherous mountain outside of town. After a day of successfully plowing Springfield citizens' driveways, Homer sees a news report that says Barney is trapped in an avalanche on Widow's Peak. Feeling guilty and fearful for Barney's life, Homer drives to the mountain and rescues Barney. Barney and Homer reconcile and agree to become business partners. However, after Homer says, "When two best friends work together, not even God himself can stop them!", an angered God promptly retaliates by increasing the outside temperature, melting all the snow and effectively putting both Homer and Barney out of business. Since Homer can no longer make the snowplow payments, his plow is repossessed, but he keeps the Mr. Plow jacket to wear to bed because he knows it arouses Marge.

== Production ==
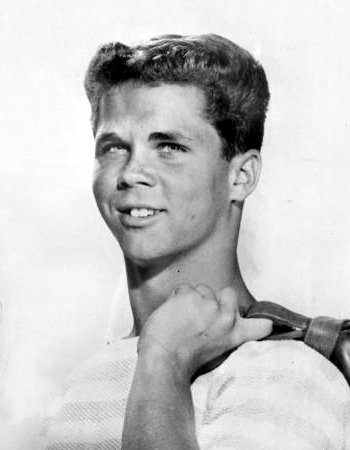
On the telephone, Homer pretends to be actor Tony Dow, and calls people gay. This joke was originally going to be censored for legal reasons.

When the episode was being written, many writers' contracts for The Simpsons had expired, so some writers were not at the annual story retreat. Al Jean was very nervous about how they could write a whole new season with such a small crew. In addition, there were several scenes added after the animatic, making the schedule even tighter. However, Jon Vitti was very committed to this episode and pitched almost the entire plot by himself.

It was Vitti's idea to have Adam West at the car show, as he wanted to finally meet him. The other writers agreed because they were all big fans of Batman as children and also wanted to meet West. Matt Groening said that West was one of the most popular people to ever come to the studio. Linda Ronstadt was recorded in San Francisco. Vitti was tasked with recording Ronstadt, and enjoyed it immensely. He said the most beautiful thing he has ever heard is Ronstadt singing the Spanish Plow King jingle.

Two more script changes that put extra pressure on the episode were a post-animatic rewrite and a complete character change. In the original script for the episode, Lenny was going to be Homer's rival, the Plow King. The idea was quickly dropped because it did not seem to fit in. The post-animatic rewrite was to include the joke in which Homer uses the radio dial to tip the precariously balanced plow back onto the road. This joke was pitched by Conan O'Brien, and the writers liked it so much that they added it to the episode.

The Simpsons team encountered trouble with the network censors in the scene where Homer answers the phone and pretends to be Tony Dow from Leave It to Beaver. After a brief pause, Homer replies to an inquiry by the person on the phone with "Yeah, they were gay." The censors refused to allow the line to be aired, fearing legal recourse for libel. The Simpsons crew protested, arguing that no one in particular was being implied, and that the "they" could be anybody. After numerous phone calls and arguments, the censors allowed the joke to air.

== Cultural references ==
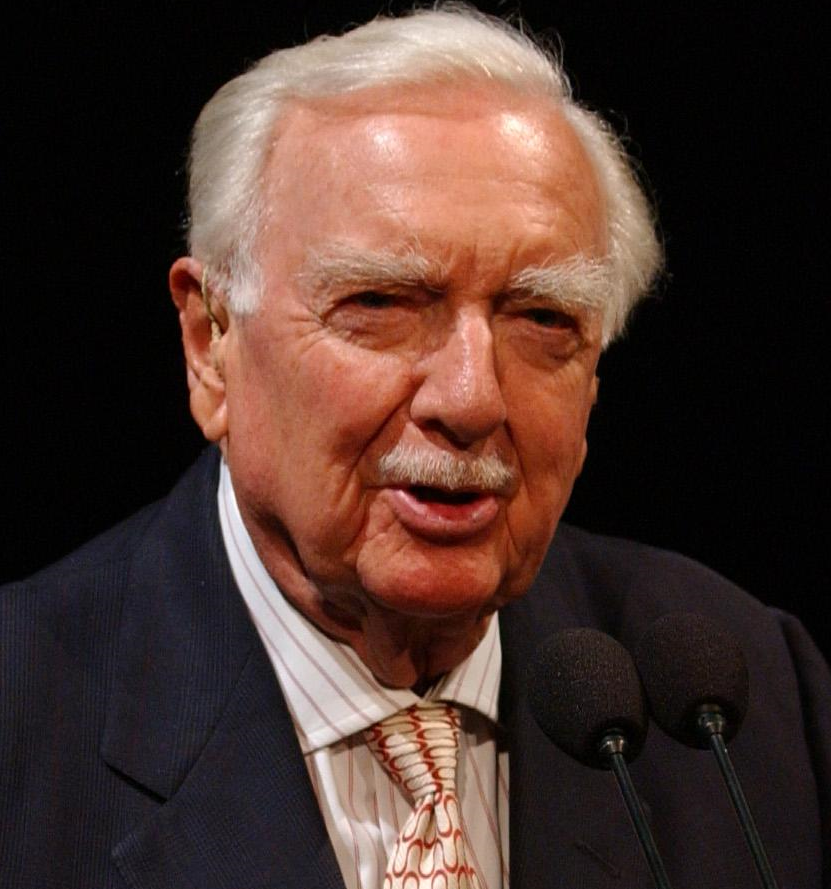
The episode parodies Walter Cronkite's reporting of the assassination of John F. Kennedy.

The Carnival of the Stars show seen at the start of the episode is a parody of Circus of the Stars, an annual special that aired on CBS from 1976 to 1994, which featured celebrities performing circus acts. Troy McClure is broadcasting from Molokai, adding "It's not just for lepers anymore!" "Mr. Plow" contains several references that Al Jean called "very obscure". In the scene of Kent Brockman reporting Barney's accident, his attire (including glasses) and facial expressions are similar to Walter Cronkite's when reporting the Kennedy assassination. The scene where Homer drives over a rickety bridge in the mountains is a parody of a climactic scene from William Friedkin's Sorcerer (1977), including music similar to Tangerine Dream's score for the film.

The lyrics and melody of the original Mr. Plow jingle, "Call Mr. Plow, that's my name, that name again is Mr. Plow!", are based on the Roto-Rooter jingle, "Call Roto-Rooter, that's the name, and away go troubles down the drain." The revamped Mr. Plow commercial is a parody of a similar perfume commercial that aired at the time of the episode's production. The fast-moving clouds were taken from the documentary Koyaanisqatsi. The music in the commercial was a Russian recording of "Casta Diva" from Vincenzo Bellini's Norma. At the time the episode was made, Russia did not abide by American copyright laws and America did not respect Russia's copyright laws, so they would not have to pay to use the recording. The shattered snowglobe is an allusion to Citizen Kane (1941).

Adam West plays himself and is first seen signing autographs at a car show. When West says he is Batman and worked with Robin, Bart says he doesn't know who Robin is, and West goes on a tangent about how he was disappointed by the newer Batman movies where the actor suited up with prosthetic chests. Linda Ronstadt's desire to record a Spanish version of the Plow King jingle, along with her mariachi costume in Barney's commercial, are references to her recording several popular Spanish-language albums celebrating the music of Mexico, beginning with Canciones de Mi Padre. The McMahon & Tate advertising firm is a reference to Bewitched. The scene of Barney's gradual descent into a drunk is a parody of the transformation sequence in Dr. Jekyll and Mr. Hyde (1941). The scene of Bart being pelted with snowballs is a reference to the Sonny Corleone tollbooth shooting scene in The Godfather (1972). When Moe offers free beer to Homer, Barney mentions that he hadn't done that for the Iranian hostages. The snowmen melting during the heatwave is a reference to the melting Nazis at the end of Raiders of the Lost Ark.

== Reception ==
In its original broadcast, "Mr. Plow" finished 23rd in ratings for the week of November 16–22, 1992, with a Nielsen rating of 14.6, equivalent to approximately 13.6 million viewing households. It was the highest-rated show on the Fox network that week, beating Married... with Children.

In 1993, Dan Castellaneta won an Emmy Award for "Outstanding Voice-Over Performance" for his performance as Homer in this episode. It was his second consecutive Emmy, as he had also won in the same category the previous year. In 1993, "Mr. Plow" and "A Streetcar Named Marge" were submitted for the Primetime Emmy Award for "Outstanding Comedy Series". The Simpsons' staff had previously submitted episodes for "Outstanding Animated Program", winning twice, but that season they took a chance with the main comedy category. However, the Emmy voters were hesitant to pit cartoons against live action programs, and The Simpsons did not receive a nomination. The Simpsons' crew submitted episodes for Outstanding Comedy Series the next season, but again these were not nominated. Since then, the show has submitted episodes in the animation category and has won eight times.

In 2003, the episode was placed sixth on Entertainment Weekly's top 25 The Simpsons episode list. In June 2009, Robert Canning of IGN gave the episode a score of 9.8 out of 10 and said it was "a fantastic episode that told an engaging story and was laugh-out-loud funny from start to finish. [...] There was a fun, engaging story, great guest stars poking fun at themselves, flashbacks, songs, cutaways and opportunities to highlight characters outside the series' namesake family."

In January 2010, Michael Moran of The Times ranked the episode as the second best in the show's history. Gary Russell and Gareth Roberts, the authors of the book I Can't Believe It's a Bigger and Better Updated Unofficial Simpsons Guide, enjoyed the episode. They said that it is: "A good one. The highlights; the TV show Carnival of Stars, featuring Angela Lansbury walking on hot coals ('Excitement, she wrote!'), Homer's flashback to all he's done for Barney, and best of all, the McMahon & Tate ad agency's arty commercial for Mr. Plow." In June 2012, Nathan Rabin of The A.V. Club stated that the episode "isn't just spectacularly funny and filled with classic bits: it also foretells the future. Not bad for an animated cartoon from the 1990s."

When asked to pick his favourite season out of The Simpsons seasons one through twenty, Paul Lane of the Niagara Gazette picked season four and highlighted "Brother from the Same Planet" and "Mr. Plow" which he called "excellent", along with "the sweetly funny" "Lisa's First Word", and "Homer the Heretic". The episode's reference to The Godfather was named the 37th greatest film reference in the history of the show by Total Film's Nathan Ditum. Ditum also ranked West's performance as the seventh-best guest appearance in the show's history.

When The Simpsons began streaming on Disney+ in 2019, former Simpsons writer and executive producer Bill Oakley named this one of the best classic episodes to watch on the service.

== Legacy ==
On December 17, 2015, Google and YouTube modernized the episode and its "Mr. Plow" jingle for use in a commercial in which Lisa uses the website on her computer to place Homer's advertisement onto its YouTube campaign.
