= Michael Carrington (voice actor) =

American comic writer and voice actor

- Occupations: Comic writer; Voice actor

Michael Carrington is an American comic writer and voice actor best known for his work on the animated series The Simpsons. He co-wrote the episode "Homer's Triple Bypass" with Gary Apple and has provided occasional voicework, most notably as Sideshow Raheem (Krusty's militant black sideshow partner in the 1970s) in "I Love Lisa", the black comedian who does the joke about black drivers versus white drivers in "Homer and Apu", the drill sergeant in "Simpson Tide," and a sportscaster in "Million Dollar Abie".

Carrington has also written for The Jamie Foxx Show, The Proud Family, and The Gregory Hines Show and did some voice work for The Critic and appeared in the television series Martin and made appearances as the host of the first season of the children's game show Think Fast! and appears as one of the journalists in the film screened in the queue area of the theme park ride Space Mountain. He has been a writer and producer of That's So Raven.
