= Homer and Apu =

- The Simpsons episode
- Apu and the Simpson family singing "Who Needs The Kwik-E-Mart?"
- Episode no.: Season 5 Episode 13
- Directed by: Mark Kirkland
- Written by: Greg Daniels
- Production code: 1F10
- Original air date: February 10, 1994

Guest appearances
- James Woods as himself; Michael Carrington as Comedian

Episode features
- Chalkboard gag: "I will not go near the kindergarten turtle"
- Couch gag: The family's heads pop out from behind the couch, with Maggie's head popping up last out from a cushion on the couch.
- Commentary: David Mirkin; Greg Daniels; Mark Kirkland; David Silverman

Episode chronology
← Previous "Bart Gets Famous"	Next → "Lisa vs. Malibu Stacy"
- The Simpsons season 5

"Homer and Apu" is the thirteenth episode of the fifth season of the American animated television series The Simpsons. It originally aired on the Fox network in the United States on February 10, 1994. In the episode, Homer participates in a hidden-camera investigation of spoiled food being sold at the Kwik-E-Mart. The chain's corporate office fires Apu and replaces him with actor James Woods, who is doing research for an upcoming film role. Apu misses his job, so he and Homer travel to India to persuade the head of the Kwik-E-Mart corporation to rehire him.

The episode was written by Greg Daniels and directed by Mark Kirkland. James Woods made a guest appearance as himself. The episode features cultural references to films such as The Hard Way, JFK, and Lawrence of Arabia.

Since airing, the episode has received mostly positive reviews from television critics. It acquired a Nielsen rating of 13.3, and was the highest-rated show on the Fox network the week it aired.

== Plot ==
Several customers at the Kwik-E-Mart become angry because of Apu's high prices on cheaply produced items. Apu lowers the price of a package of expired ham from 1989 instead of throwing it out. Homer purchases the expired ham, eats it, and contracts food poisoning. When he recovers, Homer complains to Apu, who gives him a pair of five-pound buckets of expired shrimp as an apology. Homer accepts the shrimp, eats it, and contracts food poisoning again. While Homer recovers, he and Lisa watch the investigative news program Bite Back with Kent Brockman. Lisa encourages Homer to ask the show's producers to investigate the Kwik-E-Mart.

Kent gives Homer a giant novelty hat containing a spy camera to expose Apu for selling expired food. After Apu mistakes the camera's electronic buzzing sound for a bee, Homer becomes frightened and destroys the hat. However, the still-functional camera films Apu dropping a hot dog on the floor and returning it to the roller grill. Apu is fired by corporate headquarters — despite complying with their unsanitary food-handling policies — and is replaced by actor James Woods, who is doing research for a role in an upcoming film.

Apu comes to the Simpsons' house, reaching out his arms as if to strangle Homer; however, Apu's posture is merely the traditional form of apology in the Indian village where he was born. Apu hopes to work off his karmic debt for selling Homer expired food by performing household chores for the Simpsons. At first, Homer is reluctant to accept Apu's help, but soon the family appreciates his dutiful behavior. After a few weeks, Apu declares he does not need the Kwik-E-Mart anymore; however, the family discovers Apu still deeply misses his old job. Homer, feeling guilty, accompanies Apu to the Kwik-E-Mart's head office in India. There, they meet with the head of the Kwik-E-Mart corporation, who grants them only three questions; however, Homer wastes the questions on inane banter. An enraged Apu chokes Homer, who thinks Apu is trying to apologize again.

When Apu returns to the Kwik-E-Mart to face his fears, a robber bursts into the store with a gun. He shoots at Woods, but Apu saves him by leaping in the bullet's path. At the hospital, Dr. Hibbert says Apu survived because the bullet ricocheted off another bullet lodged in his chest from a previous robbery. Grateful for Apu's heroism, Woods gives him his job back and leaves to "battle aliens on a faraway planet", which is implied to be a real-life situation rather than preparation for another movie. The Simpsons hug Apu; Homer then notices there is still time left in the episode, and the family hugs Apu again.

== Production ==
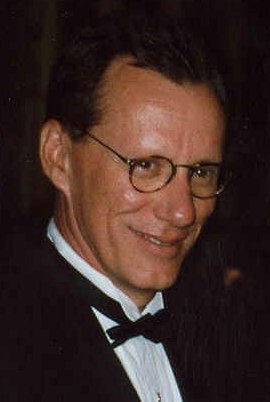
James Woods guest starred in the episode.

The episode was written by Greg Daniels, and directed by Mark Kirkland. It was the first full episode of the show that Daniels wrote. The Simpsons writers Al Jean and Mike Reiss, who were show runners during the previous two seasons, pitched the premise. They left it with David Mirkin, who took over the job as show runner during this season. Mirkin said he was "very excited and intrigued" with the premise. Soon thereafter, he assigned Daniels to write the script because he knew that Daniels would "step up" and "throw himself into it". In an interview with the Chicago Tribune, Mirkin stated that when he took over the show, he wanted to "bring it back" to character and story; unlike the previous season, which got "so fast-moving and so full of cutaway gags". Mirkin added: "I explored the characters a little more, took them a little further. I had one of the first episodes where Homer was really tempted by another woman, 'The Last Temptation of Homer', and Bart having a girlfriend even nastier than himself, 'Bart's Girlfriend', plus more of a focus on side characters. We did the first episode to really feature Apu as a main character. Those were my goals." Kirkland said he was grateful that he got to work with a "wonderful crew" on the episode, including Bob Anderson, who he thought was a "wonderful" director. Kirkland said that Anderson assisted him on the episode and did "fine animation throughout".

When Mirkin took over as show runner, he listed actor James Woods as one of the people he would most like to guest star on the show. Michael Caine was originally supposed to be the actor in the episode who takes over Apu's job at the Kwik-E-Mart, but he rejected the role. The story was therefore rewritten so that Woods received Apu's job instead. When the season was in production, producer Bill Oakley wrote on the online fan forum alt.tv.simpsons that David Bowie was being considered for the guest role in this episode. Woods was one of animation director David Silverman's favorite guest stars. Mirkin said he provided one of the "most fantastic" performances ever on the show, and commented that he "nailed" all of his lines and was "so funny, right at the top of his head". Mirkin said that when most guest stars come in to record their lines for the show, they are a little nervous because they have never done voice-over before. Mirkin noted, however, that Woods was a "fearless guy" and he was "so excited to do it because he was a huge fan of the show". Silverman noted that in addition to his humorous ad-libbing, Woods's tendency to hesitate while speaking was "great for animation", explaining that it made the character feel more realistic. "Homer and Apu" features the popular Simpsons song "Who Needs the Kwik-E-Mart?", sung by Apu and the Simpson family. The song was written by all of the show's writers in the writer's room, and it was composed by Alf Clausen. The song later appeared on the soundtrack album Songs in the Key of Springfield.

== Cultural references ==
The episode features cultural references to many American and British films. Woods becoming a convenience store clerk to prepare for a film is similar to Nick Lang (Michael J. Fox) becoming a police officer in The Hard Way (1991), which Woods starred in (this is a reversal of roles: Woods played the cop that Lang was saddled with in the film). When Kent asks Homer if he is willing to go undercover to "nail" Apu, Homer replies: "No way, man, get yourself another patsy!" This is a reference to a line in JFK (1991). The scene of Homer and Apu riding on mules to the Springfield Airport, with their luggage strapped to the mules' backs, is similar to a scene from Lawrence of Arabia (1962). In his Kwik-E-Mart job interview, the interviewer asks Woods why he would want to work at the Kwik-E-Mart, to which he replies: "To be honest, in my upcoming movie I'm going to be playing this tightly-wound convenience store clerk and, I kind of like to research my roles and really get into it. For instance, in True Believer I actually worked in a law firm for two months. And then, the film Chaplin I had a little cameo in that. I actually traveled back in time, back to the twenties, where... Well, I've said too much." Woods also mentions the 1979 film The Onion Field and the 1986 film Salvador as his "previous job experience".

== Reception ==
In its original American broadcast, "Homer and Apu" finished twenty-sixth in the ratings for the week of February 7–13, 1994, with a Nielsen rating of 13.3. The episode was the highest-rated show on the Fox network that week. The song "Who Needs The Kwik-E-Mart?" was nominated for an Emmy Award in the "Outstanding Individual Achievement in Music and Lyrics" category.

Since airing, the episode has received mostly positive reviews from television critics.

The authors of the book I Can't Believe It's a Bigger and Better Updated Unofficial Simpsons Guide, Gary Russell and Gareth Roberts, wrote: "One of the very best, with the gags coming thick and fast. We particularly like the spy camera concealed in Homer's massive stetson, Apu and Marge's trip to the Monster Mart, and 'Who Needs the Kwik-E-Mart?', possibly the cleverest song in the series. And the Christians harassing people at the Indian airport, and Homer's wastage of three questions, and James Woods' parting words to the Simpsons, and the footage of Apu doing a hummingbird impression..."

DVD Movie Guide's Colin Jacobson said: "The first episode to focus on Apu, this one works well. Our glimpses of Apu’s sleaziness and culture are entertaining, and the 'Who Needs the Kwik-E-Mart?' tune is one of the better musical numbers [of the show]." Jacobson went on to say: "Also count James Woods as one of the all-time best guest stars, which is likely why he gets many more lines than the average cameo voice."

Total Film's Nathan Ditum named Woods' performance in the episode the 19th best guest appearance on The Simpsons.

Patrick Bromley of DVD Verdict gave the episode a grade of A+ and commented that it features one of the best musical numbers in the show's "history of great musical numbers".

Adam Suraf of Dunkirkma.net named it the best episode of the season, and added: "I don’t know what it is about this episode — the 'Who Needs the Kwik-E-Mart?' song number; James Woods filling in for Apu at the store; or Homer's wise line 'I've learned that life is one crushing defeat after another until you just wish Flanders was dead' — but the entire affair is inspired. [...] It's in the little details that make this episode the year's best, and solidifies The Simpsons as the funniest sitcom of all time."

AskMen.com ranked "Homer and Apu" as number six on its list of the top ten The Simpsons episodes.

Bill Gibron of DVD Talk gave the episode a score of 5 out of 5.

=== Analysis ===
The episode has become study material for sociology courses at University of California Berkeley, where it is used to "examine issues of the production and reception of cultural objects". In the book Leaving Springfield, Duncan Beard said the episode served as a parody of the peculiarities of the American convenience store. Beard particularly cited the Muzak and the dinging bell as Homer and Apu entered the Kwik-E-Mart in India, and the sign that read, "The Master Knows All (except combination to safe)". Beard said, "Here the show presents its own instance of the global culture of consumer capitalism, transplanted intact and indistinguishably unaltered from the suburbs of America to a mountain top in some indefinable region of the post-partitioned Commonwealth nation of India, purely for the purpose of parodically criticizing the banality of quick-stop stores."

Paul Cantor, who analyzed the episode in his book Gilligan Unbound: Pop Culture in the Age of Globalization, said, "The Simpsons could offer no better image of the bizarre logic of contemporary globalization than a worldwide convenience store empire run by an enlightened guru from the sacred mountains of India." Cantor also specifically cited the "Master Knows" sign, which he said combined the perceived wisdom of the East with the business acumen of the West.

Tasleem Shakur and Karen D'Souza write in their book Picturing South Asian culture in English that "Homer and Apu" typifies the key articulation of the character of Apu juxtaposed to Homer, "something like his alter-ego", where Homer is the all American, Duff drinking, rather lazy nuclear plant worker, and Apu is the immigrant, clean living, hard working, small businessman. Their friendship, the authors added, is typically of a strong degree of mutual respect and a kind of admiration for what the other represents.
