= Homer the Heretic =

- The Simpsons episode
- Homer talks to God. God was animated with five fingers, rather than four like the other characters. In the final scene, however, he was unintentionally animated with four fingers.
- Episode no.: Season 4 Episode 3
- Directed by: Jim Reardon
- Written by: George Meyer
- Production code: 9F01
- Original air date: October 8, 1992

Episode features
- Chalkboard gag: "I will not defame New Orleans"
- Couch gag: The couch swivels round into the wall, and an empty couch assumes its place.
- Commentary: Matt Groening; Al Jean; George Meyer; Jim Reardon

Episode chronology
| ← Previous "A Streetcar Named Marge" | Next → "Lisa the Beauty Queen" |
- The Simpsons season 4

"Homer the Heretic" is the third episode of the fourth season of the American animated television series The Simpsons. It originally aired on Fox in the United States on October 8, 1992. In the episode, Homer decides to forgo going to church and has an excellent time staying home. His behavior quickly attracts the wrath of God, who visits him in a dream. The chalkboard gag from this episode was a reference to the previous episode "A Streetcar Named Marge", which had made controversial references to New Orleans.

The episode was written by George Meyer and directed by Jim Reardon. It received positive reviews and has been acclaimed as one of the best episodes of the season, and the series as a whole.

== Plot ==
One Sunday morning, Homer decides that he will not go to church after seeing how cold it is outside and splitting his pants while getting dressed. Marge, Bart, Lisa, and Maggie attend the day's service, but must put up with the church's malfunctioning furnace, the doors freezing shut when the churchgoers try to leave after the service ends, and car trouble in the parking lot when the car breaks down. Homer, meanwhile, spends the morning goofing around the house, eating large amounts of fatty foods, and watching TV.

When Marge and the children return home, Homer proclaims that he had the best day of his life because he skipped church, and thus he will never attend church again; Marge is horrified by this. That night, Marge prays for Homer; Homer, meanwhile, falls asleep during Marge's praying and has a dream about meeting God. In the dream, God is initially enraged at Homer for forsaking his church, but he comes to understand Homer's viewpoint and agrees to let him worship in his own way. Homer invents his own religion tailored to his personal tastes, including holidays he invents to get out of work.

Marge, Reverend Lovejoy and Ned attempt to convince Homer to attend church again, but Homer remains devoted to his own religion. The next Sunday morning, while his family is at church, Homer falls asleep on the couch while smoking a lit cigar, which sets the house ablaze. Apu, chief of Springfield's volunteer fire department, rushes to the Simpson house with other volunteer firefighters including Krusty the Clown, Chief Wiggum, and Barney. Ned rescues Homer from the burning house. The firefighters arrive and extinguish the fire.

Homer interprets the fire as God delivering vengeance. Reverend Lovejoy posits that God was working through Homer's friends to save him, despite their different faiths. Homer agrees to give church another chance after further encouragement from Reverend Lovejoy. However, while Homer does show up to church the next Sunday, he falls asleep and snores loudly during the service. In the dream Homer has during the service, God consoles Homer on the ultimate failure of Homer's invented religion. Homer asks God what the meaning of life is, and after finding out Homer doesn't want to wait until he dies to find out on his own, God reluctantly begins to answer Homer's question, just as the closing credits start rolling, preventing God from revealing the meaning of life to the viewers.

== Production ==
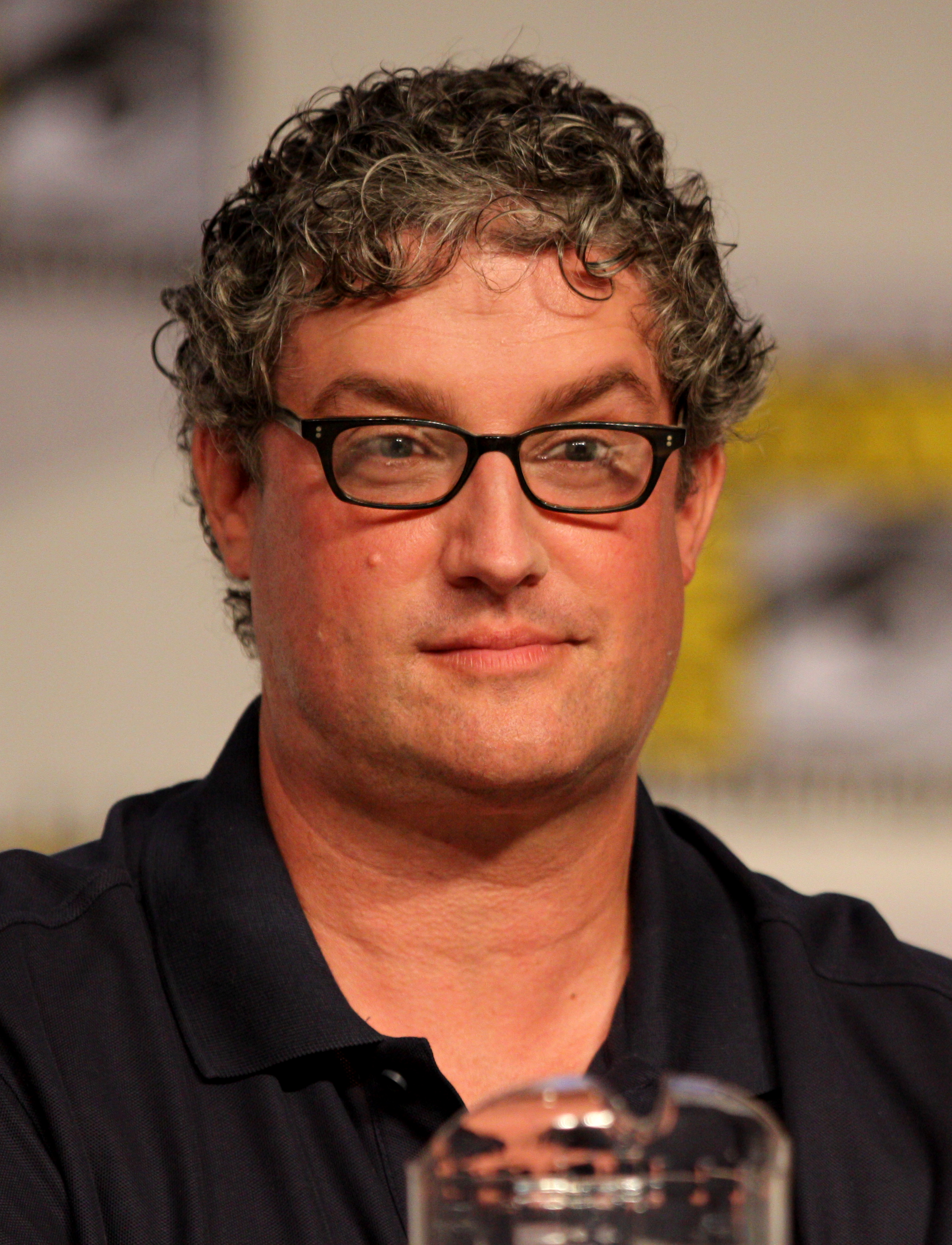
Al Jean suggested the plot of the episode.

This episode originated when Al Jean commented to Mike Reiss, "We had a lot of luck with Homer stealing cable, which was based on the eighth commandment, so maybe we could look to other commandments. So we thought, 'Honor the Sabbath' would be a good one. So the 'Homer doesn't go to church' storyline was given to George Meyer." Reiss and Jean thought that as a lapsed Catholic, Meyer would "bring the proper degree of rage" to the episode. Meyer had a lot of fun making the episode, thinking that most people could relate to the bliss of staying home from church. One of the main problems Meyer had writing this episode is that whenever Homer saw God, he had to have fallen asleep so that it appeared to be a dream. Meyer did not want to show that God was literally appearing to Homer. This resulted in him falling asleep so many times during the first draft of the episode that it was almost as if Homer had narcolepsy. This was also the first episode from season four that was read to the production team. Although first reads on previous seasons had not been well received by the production team, "Homer the Heretic" read very well, particularly some of the visuals in the third act, such as the house on fire and Homer being rescued by Flanders.

This was the first episode of The Simpsons where the animation was produced by Film Roman and the first where it was overseas at the newly formed Rough Draft Studios (which was founded by Gregg Vanzo, who had directed the episode "There's No Disgrace Like Home"). Up until this point, Film Roman had mostly worked on Garfield and Friends and Bobby's World episodes, and were not used to the speed in which The Simpsons episodes were produced. However, they quickly adjusted. As for Rough Draft, The Simpsons was one of the first shows they worked on, along with The Ren & Stimpy Show. Film Roman and Rough Draft went on to animate the show until the former was replaced by Fox Television Animation in 2016, and also would fully collaborate together on The Simpsons Movie in 2007, along with AKOM, which also oversees the show's animation. The latter would also work on Matt Groening's other shows, like Futurama and Disenchantment. Previously, the animation was produced by Klasky Csupo.

The chalkboard gag for this episode, "I will not defame New Orleans", was made as an apology to the citizens of New Orleans after it was musically insulted in the previous episode. Along with "Mr. Plow", a later episode of this season, this is one of the few television episodes that prominently featured snow outside of Christmas or Thanksgiving centric episodes.

In the scene in which Jimi Hendrix and Benjamin Franklin play a game of air hockey in Heaven, Hendrix was supposed to have a speaking line of his own to respond to Franklin's line. It was cut late during production because the actor for Hendrix did not sound enough like Hendrix. Franklin's line was kept because "nobody knows what he sounds like", whereas Hendrix had a distinct voice. The abrupt cutting off of God's voice before he reveals the meaning of life was intended to be cut off by a voice-over promotion for whatever Fox program aired after The Simpsons.

The episode was notable for portraying God as having five fingers on each hand, as opposed to the four fingers of every other character on The Simpsons. Extensive debate arose as to the nature and meaning of the design, however, on the DVD commentary, director Jim Reardon confessed that it was simply a production oversight.

== Cultural references ==
The brand label on Homer's shower radio reads "No-Soap, Radio!", so-named for the punch line of a well-known practical joke. The scene where Homer dances in his underwear to The Royal Teens song "Short Shorts" is almost identical to a scene in Risky Business (1983). The burning floor collapsing beneath Flanders' feet is a reference to Backdraft, (1991). During the exciting football game Homer watches, the commentator refers to the 'surprising return of Jim Brown', who had retired in 1966.

== Reception ==
In its original broadcast, "Homer the Heretic" finished 36th in ratings for the week of October 5–11, 1992, with a Nielsen rating of 12.0, equivalent to approximately 11.2 million viewing households. It was the second highest-rated show on the Fox network that week, following Married… with Children.

Gary Russell and Gareth Roberts, the authors of the book I Can't Believe It's a Bigger and Better Updated Unofficial Simpsons Guide, loved the episode. They described it as "A brilliant episode, underlining everything that The Simpsons is about. Homer hates church, Marge wants the kids to see Homer as an example, and everyone pulls together in the end. Good stuff, and if God really is like that, he's a groovy kind of guy." In 2012, HitFix's Alan Sepinwall cited the episode as his favorite of the show, writing that it "captures everything that was and is great about the series: social satire, extraordinary quotability ('This Things I Believe'), a good family story, and an innate sweetness in spite of Homer's outsized antics." When asked to pick his favorite season out of The Simpsons seasons one through twenty, Paul Lane of the Niagara Gazette picked season four and highlighted "Brother from the Same Planet" and "Mr. Plow" which he called "excellent", along with "the sweetly funny" "Lisa's First Word", and "Homer the Heretic".

In 2004, ESPN.com released a list of the Top 100 Simpsons sport moments, ranking Benjamin Franklin and Jimi Hendrix's air hockey game, a scene from the episode, at #83. The episode's reference to Risky Business was named the 45th greatest film reference in the history of the show by Total Film's Nathan Ditum.

Dan Castellaneta, the voice of Homer, named it his favorite episode of the show together with "Simpson and Delilah" and "Lisa's Substitute". When The Simpsons began streaming on Disney+ in 2019, former Simpsons writer and executive producer Bill Oakley named this one of the best classic Simpsons episodes to watch on the service. The writers of the Fox program King of the Hill put "Homer the Heretic" among the five best episodes of The Simpsons, including "Brother from the Same Planet", "Lisa's Wedding", "Lisa's Substitute", and "Behind the Laughter".

Nathan Rabin writes: "For all its good-natured heresy, 'Homer The Heretic' is respectful enough toward religion to put the moral of the episode in Reverend Lovejoy’s mouth when he tells Homer that God was 'working in the hearts of your neighbors when they came to your aid, be they Christian, Jew, or miscellaneous.' Many episodes of The Simpsons center around Homer and Marge’s marriage being tested and ultimately reaffirmed. In 'Homer The Heretic' it’s Homer’s faith that is aggressively tested before ultimately being reaffirmed. The strength and value of religion, the episode argues, ultimately lies not in its power to force people to follow arbitrary rules or go to a building every Sunday but rather in its capacity for teaching people to listen to their better angels and love and serve their fellow man. That makes 'Homer The Heretic' not just funny but also surprisingly profound."
