= New Kid on the Block =

- The Simpsons episode
- Bart dancing with Laura
- Episode no.: Season 4 Episode 8
- Directed by: Wesley "Wes" Archer
- Written by: Conan O'Brien
- Production code: 9F06
- Original air date: November 12, 1992

Guest appearances
- Sara Gilbert as Laura Powers; Pamela Reed as Ruth Powers; Phil Hartman as Lionel Hutz

Episode features
- Chalkboard gag: "I will not bring sheep to class"
- Couch gag: The Simpsons sit on the couch and it falls through the floor.
- Commentary: Matt Groening; Al Jean; Mike Reiss; Conan O'Brien; David Silverman

Episode chronology
← Previous "Marge Gets a Job"	Next → "Mr. Plow"
- The Simpsons season 4

"New Kid on the Block" is the eighth episode of the fourth season of the American animated television series The Simpsons. It originally aired on Fox in the United States on November 12, 1992. After meeting his new neighbor, Laura Powers, Bart falls in love with her, only to later discover that she has a boyfriend, Jimbo Jones, whom he attempts to scare off so that he can have a relationship with Laura. Meanwhile, Homer sues the Sea Captain Horatio McCallister after being kicked out of his all-you-can-eat restaurant while still hungry.

The episode was written by Conan O'Brien and directed by Wes Archer.

== Plot ==
The Simpsons' elderly neighbors, the Winfields, move to Florida because of Homer's antics. The Winfields' old house is purchased by divorced mother Ruth Powers and her teenage daughter Laura, with whom Bart falls in love at first sight.

After seeing a television advertisement about an all-you-can-eat seafood restaurant called "The Frying Dutchman", Homer decides to go and take Marge with him, and Bart suggests that Laura should babysit him, Lisa, and Maggie. While Laura babysits the Simpson children, Bart attempts to impress her. However, Laura tells Bart that she is dating Jimbo Jones, one of the bullies at Springfield Elementary School, much to Bart's dismay.

Meanwhile, at the restaurant, Homer quickly enrages the Sea Captain, devouring nearly all the food in the buffet, and is eventually hauled out before he has finished. Enraged, Homer sues the restaurant for false advertising, as the ad that he heard on the television prior to the incident claimed that it was "All You Can Eat", despite Homer not being full before being kicked out.

Homer hires Lionel Hutz to represent him in court, and the case is successful after Hutz convinces the jurors (who are all obese) that Homer had not had all he could eat. To avoid further legal trouble, the Sea Captain and Homer eventually strike a deal together that Homer will be displayed in the restaurant as "Bottomless Pete: Nature's Cruelest Mistake" to lure in more customers ("Come for the freak, stay for the food!"), much to Marge's embarrassment.

While Homer and Marge appear in court, Laura babysits the Simpson children again and invites Jimbo to keep her company. Bart, in an attempt to make Jimbo look bad, prank-calls Moe's Tavern, giving his name as "Jimbo Jones", and giving Moe the Simpsons' address. Believing Jimbo to be the one who has been pranking him all along, Moe rushes to the Simpson house brandishing a large, "rusty and dull" kitchen knife. He finds Jimbo, who begins crying and begging for his life; Moe spares him out of pity. Laura is disappointed that Jimbo is not the "tough outlaw" she believed him to be and breaks up with him. She tells Bart that she would certainly date him if he were older, and the episode ends with the pair laughing after prank-calling Moe again.

== Production ==
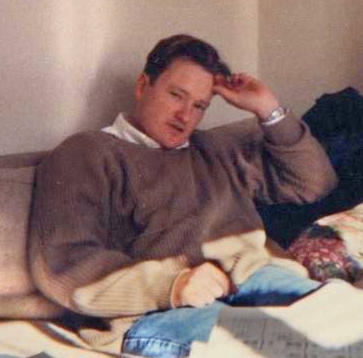
Conan O'Brien wrote the episode.

The episode was written by Conan O'Brien and directed by Wes Archer. The episode's original subplot was intended to include American actor and comedian Don Rickles as a guest star presenting a comedy show and Homer laughing excessively at his jokes, until Rickles ridicules him. The pair were intended to start fighting and end up having to go to court. Despite O'Brien and other production staff being sure that Rickles would appear in the episode, he was reportedly upset by the concept of the storyline, as he did not wish to be portrayed as a "mean guy".

When attending a Fox Broadcasting Company publicity event in New York City with Rupert Murdoch, show producer Matt Groening was introduced by Murdoch to Rickles. Rickles began shouting at Groening, accusing him of spying on his Las Vegas act and using material from that for the episode. The cast actually had been receiving recordings from Rickles from the 1950s to use as ideas on how to get the style for his animatic portrayal. Another side story the writers produced was for Homer to become an outstanding barber and hair dresser, but this was not used until the season 22 episode "Homer Scissorhands".

"New Kid on the Block" features first time appearances from Laura Powers, Ruth Powers, and The Sea Captain. Hank Azaria based the Sea Captain's voice on that of actor Robert Newton.

== Cultural references ==
The title is a standard phrase, but plays on the name of the band New Kids on the Block. This is the first of two episode titles to be named as a pun on the group, with 2001's "New Kids on the Blecch" being the second. The theme from Northern Exposure plays when the moose appears in the driveway. Bart's fantasy of dancing with Laura is based on Fred Astaire and Ginger Rogers in Top Hat (1935). Homer likens his case to Don Quixote: "this is my quest. I'm like that guy. You know, that Spanish guy. He fought the windmills?" "Don Quixote?" Marge asks. "No, that's not it. The Man of La Mancha." Bart asks Grandpa about having a crush on an older woman, and he tells Bart "I had a crush on the oldest woman. Here's a picture of her delivering Eubie Blake." The courtroom scene in which numerous sacks of letters to Santa Claus are delivered to court is a parody of Miracle on 34th Street (1947). Hutz tells Homer that his case is “the most blatant case of fraudulent advertising since my suit against the film The Neverending Story.”

== Reception ==
In its original broadcast, "New Kid on the Block" finished 23rd in ratings for the week of November 9–16, 1992, with a Nielsen rating of 14.4, equivalent to approximately 13.4 million viewing households. It was the highest-rated show on the Fox network that week, beating Beverly Hills, 90210.

In 1998, TV Guide included it in its list of the top 12 Simpsons episodes.

Gary Russell and Gareth Roberts, the authors of the book I Can't Believe It's a Bigger and Better Updated Unofficial Simpsons Guide, commented that it was "a fun episode, introducing the Powers family [and featuring] the last appearance of the Winfields".
