= I Love Lisa =

- The Simpsons episode
- Promotional image, depicting Lisa and Ralph playing on the swings.
- Episode no.: Season 4 Episode 15
- Directed by: Wes Archer
- Written by: Frank Mula
- Production code: 9F13
- Original air date: February 11, 1993

Guest appearance
- Michael Carrington as Sideshow Raheem

Episode features
- Chalkboard gag: "I will not call the principal "spud head""
- Couch gag: The family and various circus performers form a kickline, turning the living room into a circus extravaganza.
- Commentary: Matt Groening; Al Jean; Frank Mula; Wes Archer; David Silverman

Episode chronology
← Previous "Brother from the Same Planet"	Next → "Duffless"
- The Simpsons season 4

"I Love Lisa" is the fifteenth episode of the fourth season of the American animated television series The Simpsons. It originally aired on Fox in the United States on February 11, 1993. In the episode, Lisa gives Ralph Wiggum a Valentine's Day card when she sees that he has not received any. Ralph misinterprets Lisa's gesture and, much to Lisa's dismay, relentlessly pursues her with affection. Lisa snaps at Ralph on live television and angrily tells him they are not together and that she never liked him. Heartbroken, Ralph channels his feelings into his performance as George Washington in the school's President's Day pageant. After a thunderous applause from the audience, he is able to accept Lisa as just a friend.

The episode was written by Frank Mula and directed by Wes Archer. Michael Carrington guest-starred as Sideshow Raheem. Al Jean, show runner of the episode, came up with the idea for the story when he remembered that he had received a valentine from a girl in third grade that read "I Choo-Choo-Choose You". The episode features cultural references to songs such as "Monster Mash" and "Break on Through", and to the cartoon character Droopy.

Since airing, "I Love Lisa" has received mostly positive reviews from television critics; Entertainment Weekly placed the episode twelfth on their top 25 The Simpsons episodes list. It acquired a Nielsen rating of 14.9 and was the highest rated show on the Fox network the week it aired.

== Plot ==
The second-grade students at Springfield Elementary School ridicule Ralph Wiggum's strange behavior. On Valentine's Day, the students give each other Valentine's Day cards. None of the students give Ralph cards, causing him to cry. Seeing this, Lisa gives Ralph a card out of sympathy. Ralph cheers up, develops a romantic interest in Lisa, and walks her home from school. Lisa is unsure how to tell Ralph she is not interested in him.

At Marge's suggestion, Lisa tells Ralph she is not ready for a romantic relationship. Ralph asks his father, Chief Clancy Wiggum, for advice on romance; Chief Wiggum tells Ralph to be persistent. Ralph invites Lisa to come with him and his father to the taping of Krusty the Clown's upcoming 29th Anniversary Special, and Chief Wiggum blackmails Miss Hoover into giving Ralph the part of George Washington in the school's President's Day pageant, in which Lisa plays Martha Washington.

Lisa reluctantly goes to the taping of Krusty's special with Ralph. When Krusty starts interviewing audience members, Ralph takes the opportunity to declare that Lisa is the love of his life and that he intends to marry her. Furious, Lisa loses her temper and tells Ralph she does not like him and she never liked him and the only reason she gave him that card was because no one else would. Later, at home, Bart, having taped the event, replays the scene to Lisa which shows Ralph's humiliated, deeply hurt reaction; Lisa feels ashamed of herself. Wiggum comforts Ralph and attempts revenge on Lisa by smashing the taillight on Homer's car, but is alarmed when Homer warns him that one day, honest citizens will retaliate against the corrupt police.

On the night of the President's Day pageant, Lisa tries to apologize to Ralph, but he ignores her. Ralph proves to be a remarkably effective and eloquent actor, gaining the approval of the audience and even reducing Groundskeeper Willie to tears. Lisa approaches Ralph on the swing set after the performance and gives him a new card with a picture of a bee on it, reading "Let's 'Bee' Friends". Ralph laughs at the pun and happily accepts the offer of friendship as Wiggum fondly watches them from his car.

== Production ==
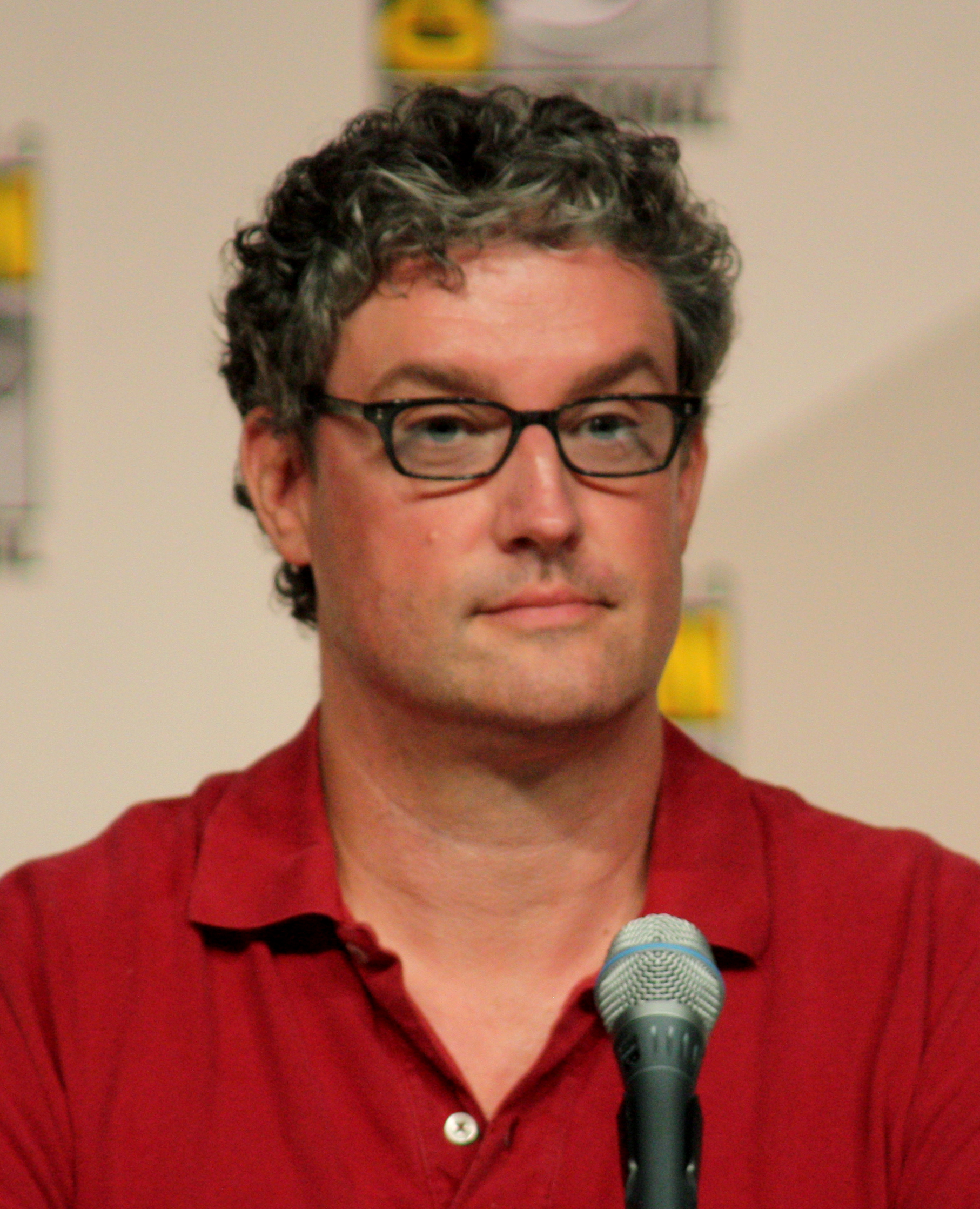
A personal event of Al Jean's life inspired the plot of this episode.

This was the first episode Frank Mula wrote for The Simpsons. Mula had previously worked with Simpsons executive producer Sam Simon at another Gracie Films show. This was the first season four episode that Wes Archer directed. Jeff Martin and Mula wrote the music for the President's Day pageant. Michael Carrington guest-stars in the episode as Sideshow Raheem, one of Krusty's old sideshows from the 70s.

The story of "I Love Lisa" originated from a personal episode of Al Jean's life; when Jean was in third grade, he received a valentine from a girl that read "I Choo-Choo-Choose You". Years later, Jean wondered if the girl had really liked him. He told writing partner Mike Reiss about it, and they thought it could be an idea for an episode where Lisa could give such a valentine to Ralph Wiggum, who would then take it too far. At that time, Ralph and Chief Wiggum were not established as being related. Jean thought it would be funny if Ralph was Wiggum's son, considering both characters are "fat and dumb". Despite this, Ralph's last name was already revealed to be Wiggum in the episode "Kamp Krusty".

A technique the staff used to come up with stories and ideas was to think "what holiday haven't we done on The Simpsons, or done lately?" As they had done several Halloween and Christmas episodes before, the staff liked the idea of doing a Valentine's Day episode.

== Cultural references ==
The title plays on the American television sitcom I Love Lucy. The song "Monster Mash" by Bobby "Boris" Pickett bookends the episode, which begins on Valentine's Day and ends on President's Day (Marty, the disk jockey on KBBL, played the wrong record.) Ned Flanders serenades his wife, Maude, to Rod Stewart's "Da Ya Think I'm Sexy?" (1979). The orchestral version of Tony Bennett's "Stranger in Paradise" can be heard in an Itchy and Scratchy cartoon. The name of the cartoon, "My Bloody Valentine", is a reference to the band of the same name. Homer's conscience, which tells him that stealing is wrong, speaks with the voice of Droopy.

Principal Skinner's flashback is an homage to Apocalypse Now (1979), with Laurence Fishburne and Frederic Forrest's characters visible in the background. President Bill Clinton and first lady Hillary Clinton appear in the audience of Krusty's anniversary show. Krusty shows a clip of Robert Frost reading "Stopping by Woods on a Snowy Evening" on his show, where Krusty dumps snow on him (Frost: "We discussed this, and I said 'no.'") Another clip shows Krusty singing "Break On Through (To the Other Side)".

The Presidents' Day pageant opens with a "tribute to our lesser known Presidents," among them John Tyler, Zachary Taylor, Millard Fillmore, Rutherford B. Hayes, and William Henry Harrison, who mentions that "I died in 30 days!" During the segment, the children on stage sing "You won’t find our faces on dollars or on cents!" and "We are the adequate, forgettable, occasionally regrettable caretaker presidents of the U.S.A.!", a reference the general obscurity and ineffectiveness of 19th century Presidents. Backstage, Lisa tries to apologize to Ralph, who says "Leave me alone! I need to play George Washington!" while donning the dress of Franklin Roosevelt.

During the re-enactment of the assassination of Abraham Lincoln at the school pageant, Bart, playing John Wilkes Booth, says "Hasta la vista, Abie!", in reference to Terminator 2: Judgment Day. The scene of Chief Wiggum sitting behind Krusty at an adult movie theater and Krusty asking "Is this a bust?" is a reference to Paul Reubens' arrest for masturbating at a pornographic movie theater in Sarasota, Florida. The positioning of Krusty's hands on his face as he watches the movie is an homage to a similar scene in Taxi Driver (1976). The Krusty Anniversary Special was based on the annual Johnny Carson Tonight Show anniversary episodes as well as most of the skits and video clips.

== Reception ==
In its original broadcast, "I Love Lisa" finished eighteenth in the ratings for the week of February 6 to February 12, 1993, with a Nielsen rating of 14.9. The episode was the highest-rated show on the Fox network that week.

Since airing, it has received many positive reviews from fans and television critics. Entertainment Weekly's Dalton Ross said the episode was both touching and humorous. He added that in the scene where Bart runs a videotape in slow motion to show Lisa how "you can actually pin-point the second when [Ralph Wiggum's] heart rips in half", the audience does not really know "whether you're shedding tears of laughter, empathy, or both—you just know that it's damn good any way you slice it."

The Arizona Republic's Bill Goodykoontz named the episode one of his five favorites and highlighted Ralph's line "and my doctor said I wouldn't have so many nosebleeds if I kept my finger out of there" as one of the best lines in the history of the show.

In a review of The Simpsons season four, Lyndsey Shinoda of Video Store cited "Brother from the Same Planet" and "I Love Lisa" among her "personal favorites" from the season.

Gary Russell and Gareth Roberts, the authors of the book I Can't Believe It's a Bigger and Better Updated Unofficial Simpsons Guide, said their favorite scenes from the episode include Principal Skinner's flashback to Valentine's Day in Vietnam, the scene in which Chief Wiggum chases a duck to get his badge back, and the one where Bart and Milhouse play John Wilkes Booth and Abraham Lincoln respectively at the school pageant. They added that those scenes were "just the icing on the cake of the main plot."

In 2003, Entertainment Weekly placed the episode twelfth on their top 25 The Simpsons episodes list, and in 2008 placed the episode second on their top "25 New Classic Holiday TV Episodes" list. In 2019, Consequence ranked it number eight on its list of top 30 Simpsons episodes.

When Principal Skinner tells the children at school that Valentine's Day is not a joke (due to Bart fabricating candy hearts with mean insults), he has a flashback in which he is sitting in a PBR somewhere in Da Nang in 1969. On an oil drum next to him is a manila envelope and a photograph of Colonel Kurtz. Skinner sees Johnny, one of his army friends, holding a Valentine card and asks him, "Sending your chick a Valentine?", to which Johnny replies "Yep", right before he is shot to death. Cutting back to the present, Skinner repeatedly calls out Johnny's name in anguish, to which a perplexed Bart states "Cool! I broke his brain." After the episode aired, a Vietnam veteran sent in a letter to the show that read, "I was watching the Valentine's Day episode of your cartoon and I saw the horrifying Vietnam flashback. Do you really think this was funny, this horrible experience?" The staff ignored the letter and, as Wes Archer pointed out, the scene was "an obvious" reference to Apocalypse Now even featuring characters that resembled Chef (Frederic Forrest) and Mr. Clean (Laurence Fishburne). In contrast, Mark Groening—the brother of Matt Groening and himself a Vietnam veteran—"loved" the sequence as well as the episode.
