= Jeff Martin (writer) =

Television writer and producer

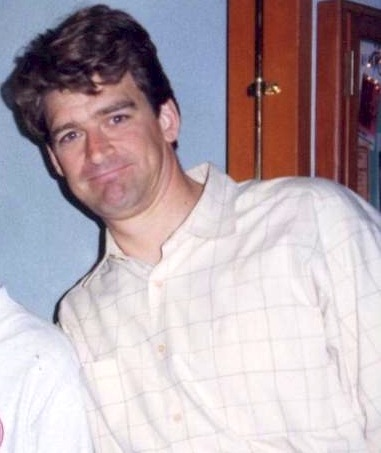
- Martin in 1994
- Born: 1960 or 1961 (age 65–66); Boston, Massachusetts, U.S.
- Education: Harvard University
- Occupations: Television producer; screenwriter
- Years active: 1980s–present
- Spouse: Suzanne Martin (m. 1986)

Jeff Martin (born 1960 or 1961) is an American television producer and writer.

== Biography ==
Born in Boston, Massachusetts, Martin graduated from Harvard University in 1982, where he wrote for The Harvard Lampoon. He wrote for Late Night with David Letterman during the 1980s before joining The Simpsons during the second, third, fourth and fifth seasons. He left, along with most of the original staff, in 1993 and returned over 20 years later to write for seasons 27 and 28. Martin has also written for Listen Up, Baby Blues, and Homeboys in Outer Space.

Martin is married to fellow television producer and writer Suzanne Martin.

== Writing credits ==
=== The Simpsons episodes ===
He is credited with writing the following episodes:

- "Dead Putting Society" (1990)
- "Oh Brother, Where Art Thou?" (1991)
- "Three Men and a Comic Book" (1991)
- "Treehouse of Horror II" (co-writer) (1991)
- "I Married Marge" (1991)
- "The Otto Show" (1992)
- "A Streetcar Named Marge" (1992)
- "Lisa the Beauty Queen" (1992)
- "Lisa's First Word" (1992)
- "Homer's Barbershop Quartet" (1993)
- "How Lisa Got Her Marge Back" (2016)
- "Moho House" (2017)
- "I'm Just a Girl Who Can't Say D'oh" (co-writer) (2019)
- "Yokel Hero" (co-writer) (2021)

=== Listen Up episodes ===
- "Pilot"
