= Frank Mula =

American television writer (1950–2021)

- Born: Frank Charles Mula; January 20, 1950; New Brunswick, New Jersey, U.S.
- Died: December 17, 2021 (aged 71); Glendale, California, U.S.
- Education: Rutgers University
- Occupations: Television writer, producer

Frank Mula (January 20, 1950 – December 17, 2021) was an American television writer. He wrote for Cosby, Madame's Place, Grand, The Simpsons, and created the series Local Heroes, which lasted 7 episodes.

== Life and career ==
Mula was born in New Brunswick, New Jersey, and was raised in South River. He graduated from South River High School, and earned a master's degree from Rutgers University. In the late 1970s, he moved to California to pursue a career in writing comedy, after having success in faxing jokes to Joan Rivers. For his work on The Simpsons, Mula won two Primetime Emmy Awards for Outstanding Animated Program.

Simpsons showrunner Mike Reiss remembered Mula as a quiet man who spoke little in the writers' room but was brilliant when he did. He solved a longstanding problem of how to resolve the episode "Lisa the Beauty Queen" by getting Lisa disqualified.

He died in Glendale, California, on December 17, 2021, at the age of 71.

== Writing credits ==
=== The Simpsons episodes ===
He has written the following episodes:

- "I Love Lisa" (1993)
- "The Last Temptation of Homer" (1993)
- "Faith Off" (2000)
