= List of World of Springfield figures and playsets =

Wikimedia list article

List of World of Springfield figures and playsets is a compilation of action figures and other items related to the animated sitcom The Simpsons and provided in the World of Springfield play toy line released by Playmates Toys in December 1999. After the last of the toy line was released in December 2004, the fictional toy world eventually encompassed over 200 different figures and characters from the series, 40 interactive playsets (toy re-creations of Simpsons interior settings and town location settings within Springfield), and three non-interactive diorama town settings.

== List of figures and playsets ==
=== Wave one ===
Release date: January 2000

- Homer Simpson - With donut, Duff Beer can, remote control and packet of "Salty Snax"
- Bart Simpson - With Santa's Little Helper, skateboard, slingshot, and spray paint can
- Lisa Simpson - With saxophone, stack of school books and Snowball
- Grampa Simpson - With removable glasses, newspaper and magnifying glass
- Mr. Burns - With money stacks and Blinky
- Krusty the Clown - With video camera, Krusty-O's, Krusty Burger, Krusty Fries and Krusty Shake

=== Wave one playsets ===
Release date: February 2000

- Simpsons Living Room with Marge and Maggie Simpson - With TV, tray of cookies and bag of groceries
- Nuclear Power Plant with Radioactive Homer — With removable hood, plate of donuts and tongs with radioactive rod

=== Wave two ===
Release date: August 2000

- Pin Pal Homer - With bowling ball and bowling bag
- Barney Gumble - With sub sandwich and beer mug
- Ned Flanders - With Bible, removable glasses, chef's hat and spatula
- Waylon Smithers - With clipboard, removable glasses and picture of Mr. Burns
- Chief Wiggum - With coffee, nightstick and donut
- Sunday Best Bart — With slingshot, Bible and Radioactive Man comic

=== Wave two playsets ===
Release date: August 2000

- Kwik-E-Mart with Apu Nahasapeemapetilon - With hot dog and Squishee
- Springfield Elementary with Principal Skinner - With American flag and clipboard

=== Wave three ===
Release date: January 2001

- Sunday Best Homer — With Bible, radio and foam hand
- Nelson Muntz - With baseball bat, spray can, water balloon and paper airplane
- Moe Szyslak - With rag, beer mug and phone
- Kamp Krusty Bart - With bow and arrow, slingshot, quiver with arrows and can of "Imitation Gruel"
- Milhouse Van Houten - With ice cream cone, Squishy, removable glasses and walkie talkie
- Otto Mann - With guitar and headphones

=== Wave three playsets ===
Release date: January 2001

- Town Hall with Mayor Quimby - With Mayor sash, gavel, briefcase of money and "Vote Quimby" sign
- Krustylu Studios with Sideshow Bob - With knife, axe, bomb, stage light, "Die Bart" license plate, cannon and movie camera.

=== Wave four ===
Release date: April 2001

- Lenny Leonard - With plate of donuts, beer mug and bowling bag
- Ralph Wiggum - With stack of books, toy rocket, keys on a chain and Radioactive Man comic
- Patty Bouvier - With video, clipboard and picture of Principal Skinner
- Groundskeeper Willie - With shovel and rake
- Casual Homer — With remote control, Duff beer, removable sunglasses and "Salty Snax"
- Itchy & Scratchy - With mallet and axe

=== Wave four playsets ===
Release date: April 2001

- Android's Dungeon Comic Book Shop with Comic Book Guy - With half-eaten cheeseburger and a shake
- Barney's Bowl-A-Rama with Pin Pal Apu - With bowling ball and bag

=== Wave five ===
Release date: July 2001

- Kent Brockman - With half-eaten donut, clipboard and microphone
- Captain McCallister — With harpoon, can of tuna and pipe.
- Bartman — With three comics, slingshot and toy rocket
- Martin Prince - With apple, clipboard, magnifying glass, stack of books and cookie tray
- Sideshow Mel — With cannon and slide whistle
- Bumblebee Man — With clipboard, bowl, spoon and video camera

Note: This is the only wave to not release a playset.

=== Wave six ===
Release date: September 2001

- Dr. Hibbert — With stethoscope, medical bag, clipboard, reflex hammer and 'shot gun'
- Snake Jailbird — With handgun, bag of money and handcuffs
- Bleeding Gums Murphy — With saxophone and "Sax on the Beach" album
- Carl Carlson - With container of donuts, beer mug, donut, bowling bag and drum of radioactive waste
- Mascot Homer - With hat, number one hand and radio
- Professor John Frink - With hat, beaker, test tubes and clipboard

=== Wave six playsets ===
Release date: September 2001

- First Church of Springfield with Reverend Lovejoy - With Bible, toy train and conductor's hat
- Noiseland Arcade with Jimbo Jones — With melting ice cream sandwich, video cassette and video camera

=== Wave seven ===
Release date: December 2001

- Dolph Starbeam — With water balloon, yo-yo, comic book and Squishy
- Cletus Spuckler - With boots, moonshine, picture of Brandine and roadkill
- Edna Krabappel - With clipboard, photo frame, pen, and can of food
- Officer Lou — With nightstick, handgun, donuts in tray and handcuffs
- Hans Moleman - With magnifying glass, cane, removable glasses, clipboard and football
- Officer Marge - With night stick, gun, counterfeit jeans, clipboard and handcuffs

=== Wave seven playsets ===
Release date: December 2001

- The Simpsons Kitchen with Muumuu Homer - With hat, bag of "Much Ado about Stuffing" and weigh scale
- Krusty Burger with Pimply Faced Teen — With hat, tray, burger box, french fries and cup

=== Wave eight ===
Release date: March 2002

- Kearney Zzyzwicz — With spray can, Newton, Squishy and bat
- Sherri and Terri — With jump rope
- Ragin' Willie - With tub of grease, shotgun and flask
- Üter — With bag of chips, two pieces of candy and stack of books
- Superintendent Chalmers — With coffee cup, clipboard and phone
- Daredevil Bart - With skateboard, removable helmet and autographed picture of Lance Murdock

=== Wave eight playsets ===
Release date: March 2002

- Springfield DMV (Department of Motor Vehicles) with Selma Bouvier - With rope barrier and Jub-Jub
- Springfield Elementary Cafeteria with Lunchlady Doris — With spoon, rat and sneeze guard

=== Wave nine ===
Release date: June 2002

- Rod and Todd Flanders — With picture of Maude and "Good Samaritan" board game.
- Busted Krusty the Clown - With handgun, bag of money, handcuffs and number four sign
- Prison Sideshow Bob - With rake, small knife, bomb and detonator
- Sunday Best Grampa — With bottle of aspirin, fez hat, Bible, removable glasses, jar of pomade and stick of beef jerky
- Disco Stu — With album, sales chart and disco ball
- Sunday Best Lisa — With chocolate Easter bunny, removable hat and donation plate

=== Wave nine playsets ===
Release date: June 2002

- Police Station with Officer Eddie — With handcuffs, desk, nightstick and handgun
- Springfield Retirement Castle with Jasper Beardly — With potted plant, TV and cane

=== Wave ten ===
Release date: October 2002

- Stonecutter Homer - With Stonecutter book, framed certificate, removable hat and beer stein
- Wendell Borton — With banana, apple, orange, stack of books and barf bag
- Sunday Best Marge and Maggie — With purse, removable hats and Bible
- Scout Leader Flanders — With scout knife, book on knife safety, removable scout's hat and glasses, half a pine cone and flare gun
- Dr. Marvin Monroe — With foam bat, cash, clipboard, diploma and removable glasses
- Resort Smithers — With phone, removable glasses, bag of pineapples and suitcase

=== Wave ten playsets ===
Release date: October 2002

- Burns Manor with Pajamas Burns — With nightcap, snow globe, red chair, fireplace screen and Bobo
- Hospital with Dr. Nick Riviera — With Buzz Cola can, open pizza box, table, rack of 4 test tubes, jar of cotton and 3 medical tools

=== Wave eleven ===
Release date: December 2002

- Larry Burns - With picture of young Mr. Burns, squash candy, Springfield sign, "Gone Drinkin'" sign and briefcase
- Plow King Barney - With cell phone, removable crown, baby bottle, Champagne bottle in ice and baseball bat
- Blue Haired Lawyer — With evidence tape, briefcase, legal pad, removable glasses, pencil and bottle of Colonel Kwik-E-Mart's Kentucky Bourbon
- Kirk Van Houten — With folder of divorce notes, tissue box, removable glasses, notepad and demo tape
- Gil Gunderson — With Dolceo computer, poker chips, foot ruler, tongs with stinky socks and bottle of seltzer
- Rainier Wolfcastle - With dumbbell, trophy, Radioactive Man script and Powersauce Bar

=== Wave eleven playset ===
Release date: December 2002

- Court Room with Judge Snyder - With American flag, gavel, law book and guilty verdict

Note: From Wave 11 to 16, only one playset was released, unlike the first ten waves.

=== Wave twelve ===
Release date: April 2003

- Number One - With Stonecutter ceremonial hat (removable), beer stein, Stonecutter book and paddle
- Database — With lunch tray, stack of books, removable glasses and a small horn
- Mr. Largo — With metronome, music stand, baton, chalk holder and sheet music
- Don Vittorio — With clown bicycle, seltzer bottle, black overcoat, folded wad of money and handgun
- Luann Van Houten — With "Kirk" moving box, stacked boxes, tape dispenser, removable glasses and can of lighter fluid
- Mr. Plow Homer - With removable hat, key to the city, "Stock for V.P." T-shirt and stack of Mr. Plow flyers

=== Wave twelve playset ===
Release date: April 2003

- Bart's Treehouse with Military Bart - With removable helmet and sunglasses, pile of water balloons, binoculars, baton and desk

=== Wave thirteen ===
Release date: July 2003

- Helen Lovejoy — With shopping bag, "Holy Rollers" bowling bag, bowling trophy and wrestling poster for El Bombastico
- Freddy Quimby - With golf bag, golf club, surfboard and bowl of chowder
- Tuxedo Krusty - With microphone, microphone stand, pink "Krusty" coffee mug, Gabbo newspaper headline and jewel encrusted clown nose
- Legs — With switchblade, rifle, picture of the missing Skinner and a bill counter
- Princess Kashmir — With framed picture of her and Homer, camera and boombox
- Dr. Stephen Hawking - With a beer mug. Hawking's wheelchair had four removable rockets (2 short and 2 long), a removable propeller, boxing glove and glasses

=== Wave thirteen playset ===
Release date: July 2003

- Military Antique Store with Herman Hermann — With a dirigible, warhead, two swords, rolled documents/plans in bin, rope barrier, riding crop and rifle

=== Wave fourteen ===
Release date October 2003

- Louie — With rifle, martini glass, carton of rat milk and briefcase of money
- Kilted Willie — With Loch Ness Monster doll, bagpipes, hat and tripod
- Ms. Botz - With suitcase, "Happy Little Elves" video, rope and tape
- Luigi Risotto — With open pizza box, removable chef's hat, bottle of wine and restaurant sign
- Sarcastic Man — With "World's Greatest Jacket", nightvision goggles, hat and the "ultimate" belt
- Miss Hoover — With coffee mug, removable glasses, "Teacher's Edition" book, bag of standardized tests and "Gimme! Gimme! Gimme!" sign

=== Wave fourteen playset ===
Release date: October 2003

- Aztec Theater with McBain — With handgun, machine gun and a hand grenade

=== Wave fifteen ===
Release date: January 2004

- Manjula Nahasapeemapetilon — With Buzz Cola bottle (with nipple for the babies), a laundry basket of clothes and a heavy stack of Wuv's diapers
- The Octuplets - With stroller
- Handsome Moe - With eye patch, coaster, Duff calendar (with damage from the stickers) and plot book
- Deep Space Homer - With intelligent monkey, carbon rod and packet of "Salty Snax"
- Brandine Spuckler — With boots, "Classy Lady" shirt and scarf
- Comic Book Guy - With four comics

=== Wave fifteen playset ===
Release date: January 2004

- Nuclear Power Plant Lunchroom with Frank Grimes - With small table, flask of acid, Grimes' lunch bag, sandwich, tray of donuts and a plate of mushrooms

=== Wave sixteen ===
Release date: June 2004

- Brain Freeze Bart — With Squishy, funnel and comic book
- Agnes Skinner — With picture of Skinner, keys, head pillow and locket
- Evil Homer — With pitchfork
- Artie Ziff — With prom king crown, trophy and picture of him and Marge and removable glasses
- Doug — With removable "Petting Zoo hat", computer and removable glasses
- Benjamin and Gary — With two removable "Petting Zoo" hats and removable Gary's glasses

=== Wave sixteen playset ===
Release date: September 2004

- Town Square with Jebediah Springfield — With removable head of Jebediah's statue and backpack

=== Toyfare exclusives ===
Release date: October 2000

- Radioactive Glow-In-The-Dark Homer — With removable hood, glow in the dark plate of donuts and tongs

Release date: July 2001

- Pin Pal Burns — With bowling ball and bag

Release date: October 2001

- Boxing Homer — With two boxing gloves

Release date: December 2001

- Convention Comic Book Guy — With a comic

Release date: December 2001

- Pin Pal Moe — With bowling ball and bag

=== Toys-R-Us exclusives ===
Release date: September 2000

- Treehouse of Horror 1 Springfield Cemetery with Devil Flanders, Fly Bart, Vampire Burns, and Ape Homer - With pitchfork, removable Flanders's glasses and evil Krusty doll

Release date: September 2001

- Treehouse of Horror 2 Alien Spaceship with Spaceship Homer, Kang and Kodos - With book for How to cook for humans and Space probe

Release date: August 2002

- Treehouse of Horror 3 Ironic Punishment with Dream Invader Willie, Witch Marge, Hugo Simpson, and Donut Head Homer - With donut, broom, rake and human parts in a tub

Release date: September 2003

- Treehouse of Horror 4 Underground Lair with Stretch Dude Bart, Lucy Lawless as Xena, Clobber Girl Lisa, and The Collector Comic Book Guy — With the Collector's ray gun

Release date: August 2002

- Barney's Bowl-A-Rama with Bowling Marge and Jacques - With two bowling balls and a bowling bag

Release date: October 2003

- Simpson's Rumpus Room with Original Homer, Marge, Bart, Lisa, and Maggie - With boxing gloves, ball, mallet and punching bag

Release date: November 2001

- Simpson's Christmas with Christmas Homer, Marge, Bart, Lisa, and Maggie on Santa's Little Helper - With piano

Release date: September 2002

- Main Street with Crazy Old Man and Squeaky Voiced Teen — With removable hat and cane

Release date: April 2002

- Lurleen Lumpkin's Trailer with Colonel Homer and Lurleen Lumpkin - With removable Colonel Homer's hat and guitar

Release date: November 2002

- New Years Town Square with New Year Homer, Marge, Bart, Lisa, and Maggie — With large noise maker, small noise maker, martini glass, party hooter, Flagpole, 2003 flag, horn and star

Release date: September 2003

- The Be Sharps Centennial with Dr. Dolittle Wiggum — With microphone

=== EB Games exclusives ===
Release date: September 2001

- Lunar Base with Rainier Wolfcastle as Radioactive Man and Milhouse as Fallout Boy - With barrel of acid, script and flag

Release date: October 2002

- KBBL Radio Station with Bill and Marty — With two headphones and two microphones

Release date: October 2003

- The Next Century with Future Burns, Future Smithers, Bobo Smitherz — With ragged Bobo and two removable Smithers's glasses

Release date: April 2002

- High School Prom with Young Homer and Marge — With corsage

Release date: January 2003

- Moe's Tavern with Duffman — With beer glass

=== Mail away ===
Release date: Late 2002

- Be Sharp Homer - With cane and removable straw hat

Release date: Early 2003

- Be Sharp Apu - With cane and removable straw hat

Release date: May 2003

- Be Sharp Skinner - With cane and removable straw hat

Release date: Late 2003

- Be Sharp Barney - With cane and removable straw hat

Release date: Late 2003

- Stonecutter Moe - With beer stein, paddle and damaged certificate

Release date: Early 2004

- Stonecutter Lenny - With paddle, book and beer stein

Release date: October 2002

- Llewellyn Sinclair (Voiced by Jon Lovitz) - With pen, newspaper review, "Ayn Rand School for Tots" and script

Release date: October 2002

- Cooder (Voiced by Jim Varney) - With tackle box, money bundles, rings for the ring toss and oversized comb

=== Celebrity Voices wave one ===
Release date: February 2002

- Troy McClure (Voiced by Phil Hartman) - With two videos, phone, clipboard and microphone
- Herbert Powell (Voiced by Danny DeVito) - With cell phone, clipboard, briefcase and drawing board with plans for the baby translator
- Fat Tony (Voiced by Joe Mantegna) - With handgun, bat, cigar and bundle of money

=== Celebrity Voices wave two ===
Release date: June 2002

- Lionel Hutz (Voiced by Phil Hartman) - With diploma, briefcase, monkey statue and business card
- Brad Goodman (Voiced by Albert Brooks) - With cup, book, can, seminar sign and video tape

=== Celebrity Voices wave three ===
Release date: October 2002

- Hank Scorpio (Voiced by Albert Brooks) - With a grenade, walkie-talkie and flame-thrower

This item was available as part of Wave Ten

=== Dioramas ===
Release date: July 2003

- Outside Simpsons House with Homer, Marge, and Maggie Simpson
- Outside Kwik-E-Mart with Grampa Simpson & Apu
- Outside Krustylu Studios with Krusty The Clown & Milhouse

=== Re-releases ===
Release date: April 2003

- Moe Szyslak
- Charles Montgomery Burns
