= The Simpsons season 1 =

Season of television series

The Simpsons
- Season 1
- DVD cover featuring the Simpson family. From left to right: Homer Simpson, Santa's Little Helper, Marge Simpson, Lisa Simpson, Snowball II, Maggie Simpson, and Bart Simpson.
- Showrunners: James L. Brooks; Matt Groening; Sam Simon
- No. of episodes: 13

Release
- Original network: Fox
- Original release: December 17, 1989 – May 13, 1990

Season chronology
- Next → Season 2

The first season of the American animated sitcom The Simpsons aired on Fox between December 17, 1989, and May 13, 1990. It premiered with the Christmas special "Simpsons Roasting on an Open Fire". The executive producers for the first production season were Matt Groening, James L. Brooks, and Sam Simon.

The series was originally set to debut in fall 1989 with the episode "Some Enchanted Evening" (which was meant to introduce the main characters), but during the first screening of the episode, the producers discovered that the animation was so poor that 70% of the episode needed to be redone.

The producers considered aborting the series if the next episode turned out as bad, but it suffered from only easily fixable problems. The producers convinced Fox to move the debut to December 17, and aired "Simpsons Roasting on an Open Fire" as the first episode of the series. The first season won one Emmy Award, and received four additional nominations. The DVD boxset was released on September 25, 2001, in Region 1 and September 24, 2001, in both Region 2 and Region 4.

With a total of 13 episodes, this is the shortest season of the show to date, and is the only season where Homer was halfway intelligent and at times was the voice of reason and where Dan Castellaneta voiced Homer in a loose Walter Matthau impression (as he had done in the shorts). Starting the next season, Homer would begin to adopt his more familiar voice and set a lower bar for intelligence.

This is also the only season to not have a Treehouse of Horror episode.

== Voice cast & characters ==
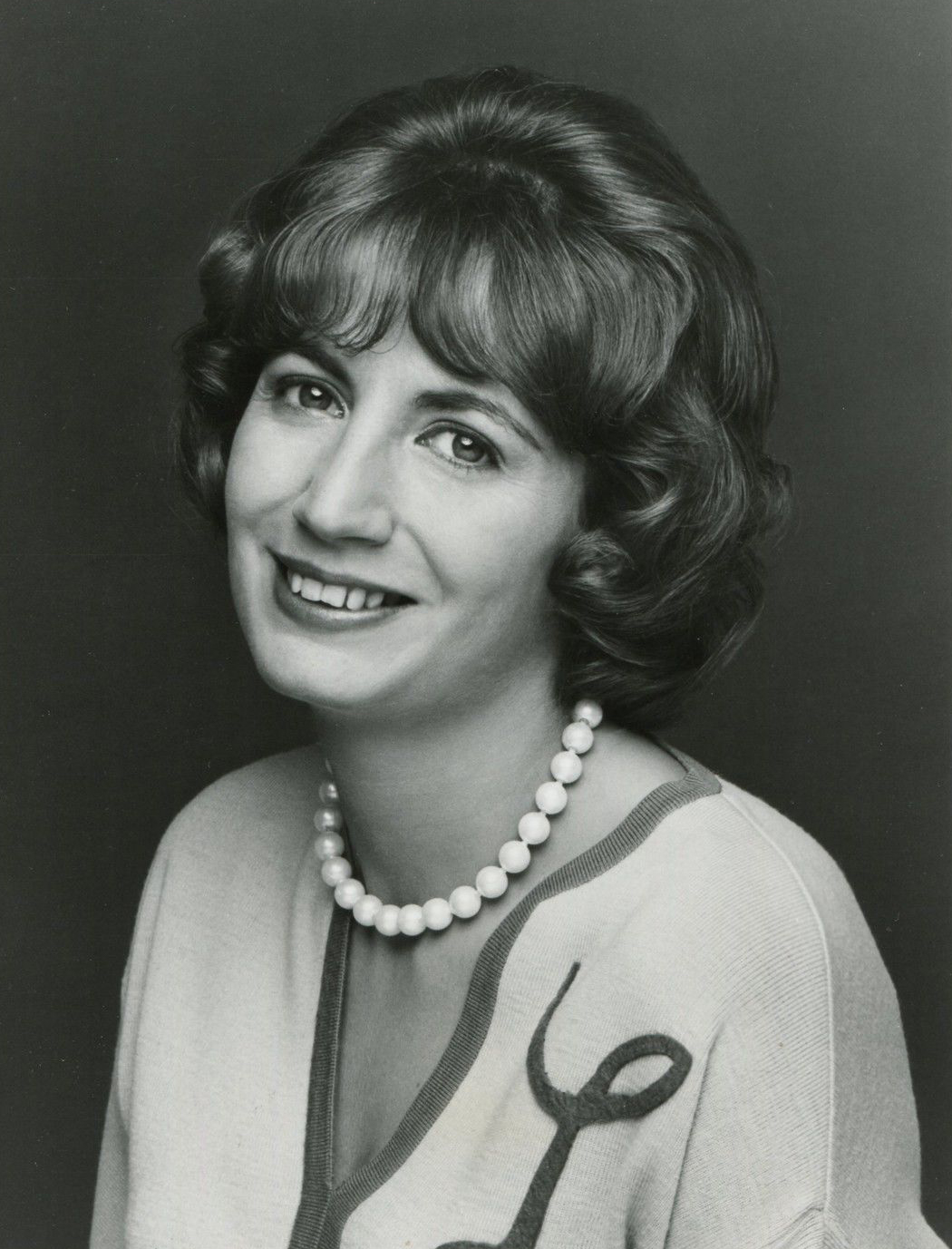
Penny Marshall guest-starred in the season finale episode "Some Enchanted Evening" as the babysitter Ms. Botz

=== Main cast ===
- Dan Castellaneta as Homer Simpson, Barney Gumble, additional voices
  - Grampa Simpson in "Simpsons Roasting on an Open Fire", "Bart the General" and "The Telltale Head"
  - Krusty the Clown in "The Telltale Head" and "Krusty Gets Busted"
- Julie Kavner as Marge Simpson, additional voices
  - Patty and Selma in "Simpsons Roasting on an Open Fire" and "Life on the Fast Lane"
- Nancy Cartwright as Bart Simpson, Lewis, additional voices
  - Nelson Muntz in "Bart the General"
  - Ralph Wiggum in "Simpsons Roasting on an Open Fire"
- Yeardley Smith as Lisa Simpson, additional voices
- Harry Shearer as additional voices
  - Waylon Smithers in "Simpsons Roasting on an Open Fire", "Homer's Odyssey", "There's No Disgrace Like Home", "The Telltale Head" and "Homer's Night Out"
  - Principal Skinner in "Simpsons Roasting on an Open Fire", "Bart the Genius", "The Telltale Head" and "The Crepes of Wrath"
  - Reverend Lovejoy in "The Telltale Head", "Homer's Night Out" and "Krusty Gets Busted"
  - Mr. Burns in "There's No Disgrace Like Home" and "Homer's Night Out"
  - Lenny Leonard in "Life on the Fast Lane", "Homer's Night Out" and "The Crepes of Wrath"
  - Ned Flanders in "Simpsons Roasting on an Open Fire" and "The Call of the Simpsons"
  - Kent Brockman in "Krusty Gets Busted"

=== Recurring ===
- Hank Azaria as Chief Wiggum, Moe Szyslak, Carl Carlson, and Apu
- Pamela Hayden as Milhouse Van Houten
- Tress MacNeille as Jimbo Jones and Agnes Skinner
- Russi Taylor as Martin Prince and Sherri and Terri
- Marcia Wallace (credited as Marsha Wallace in "Bart the Genius") as Edna Krabappel and Ms. Melon
- Maggie Roswell as Helen Lovejoy and Princess Kashmir
- Christopher Collins as Mr. Burns (3 episodes), Moe Szyslak ("Some Enchanted Evening") and TV host
- Jo Ann Harris as additional characters

=== Guest stars ===
- Sam McMurray as SNPP Employee, Duff Commercial VO ("Homer's Odyssey") and Gulliver Dark ("Homer's Night Out")
- Ron Taylor as "Bleeding Gums" Murphy ("Moaning Lisa")
- Susan Blu as Howie and Boy #2 ("Moaning Lisa")
- Miriam Flynn as Miss Barr ("Moaning Lisa")
- Albert Brooks (credited as A. Brooks) as Cowboy Bob ("The Call of the Simpsons") and Jacques ("Life on the Fast Lane")
- Charles Durning as Farmer John ("The Call of the Simpsons")
- Christian Coffinet as Gendarme Officer ("The Crepes of Wrath")
- Kelsey Grammer as Sideshow Bob ("Krusty Gets Busted")
- Penny Marshall as Ms. Botz ("Some Enchanted Evening")
- June Foray as the Rubber Baby Buggy Bumpers Babysitting Service Receptionist and Doofy the Elf ("Some Enchanted Evening")
- Paul Willson as a Florist ("Some Enchanted Evening")

== Reception ==
=== Ratings ===
The Simpsons' first season was Fox's first TV series to rank among a season's top 30 highest-rated shows.

=== Critical response ===
The first season of The Simpsons received positive reviews. On Rotten Tomatoes, the season has a 100% approval rating based on 18 critical reviews with an average rating of 8.5/10. The site's critical consensus reads: "The Simpsons' first season proves a quickly addictive introduction to America's animated first family with a run of entertaining episodes that set the stage for a groundbreaking series." On Metacritic, a site which uses a weighted average, the season has a score of 79 out of 100 based on six critics' reviews, indicating "generally favorable reviews". However, the show was controversial from its beginning. The rebellious lead character at the time, Bart, frequently received no punishment for his misbehavior, which led some parents to characterize him as a poor role model for children. Several American public schools even banned The Simpsons merchandise and t-shirts, such as one featuring Bart and the caption "Underachiever ('And proud of it, man!')". Despite the ban, The Simpsons merchandise sold well and generated US$2 billion in revenue during the first 14 months of sales.

=== Awards and nominations ===
The season won an Emmy and received four additional nominations. Although television shows are limited to one episode per category, "Simpsons Roasting on an Open Fire" was considered a separate special and nominated alongside fellow episode "Life on the Fast Lane" for Outstanding Animated Program; "Life on the Fast Lane" won. "Simpsons Roasting on an Open Fire" was also nominated for "Outstanding Editing in a Miniseries or Special", while "The Call of the Simpsons" was nominated for "Outstanding Individual Achievement in Sound Mixing for a Comedy Series or a Special". The main theme song, composed by Danny Elfman, was nominated for "Outstanding Achievement in Main Title Theme Music".

At the 6th annual Television Critics Association Awards, the first season of the show won 'Outstanding Achievement in Comedy', beating the likes of Designing Women, Murphy Brown, Newhart and The Wonder Years. Additionally, it was nominated for 'Program of the Year' but lost to Twin Peaks.

== Episodes ==
No. overall	No. in season	Title	Directed by	Written by	Original release date	Prod. code	U.S. viewers (millions)
1	1	"Simpsons Roasting on an Open Fire"	David Silverman	Mimi Pond	December 17, 1989	7G08	26.7
While the Simpsons are Christmas shopping, Bart sneaks off and gets a tattoo. Marge soon discovers this and uses the family's Christmas savings to get it removed. Meanwhile, Homer discovers that he will not be getting a Christmas bonus from Mr. Burns and thus the family has no money to buy Christmas presents. He decides to keep their financial troubles a secret and get a job as a department store Santa, but later discovers that the job does not pay enough. Desperate for a miracle, Homer and Bart go to the dog track on Christmas Eve in hopes of earning some money. He bets it all on a long shot named Santa's Little Helper, who loses. Angry that he lost, the dog's owner disowns him. Homer lets Bart keep him. Later, Homer attempts to come clean to everyone, but Bart exclaims that they have a dog and everyone happily welcomes the newest member of the Simpson family.
2	2	"Bart the Genius"	David Silverman	Jon Vitti	January 14, 1990	7G02	24.5
Bart has trouble on an intelligence test and sneakily switches tests with Martin Prince, the class genius. After the results are tabulated, the school psychiatrist labels Bart a genius and sends him to the Enriched Learning Center for Gifted Children. Homer starts treating Bart with respect, but Bart immediately feels out of place among his new classmates and alienated from his former peers. He confesses that he cheated on the test and is subsequently sent back to Springfield Elementary School.
3	3	"Homer's Odyssey"	Wes Archer	Jay Kogen & Wallace Wolodarsky	January 21, 1990	7G03	27.5
Bart's class visits the Springfield Nuclear Power Plant and Homer, anxious to look like he is working, accidentally crashes his cart into a radioactive pipe, causing him to be fired. Depressed and unable to find a new job, he decides to commit suicide by jumping off a bridge. His family discover his plan and try to stop him, but in the process they are almost run over by a truck. Discovering his new purpose, Homer embarks on a safety crusade and eventually decides to go after the Nuclear Plant and holds protest rallies. To end Homer's furor, Mr. Burns offers him a job as safety inspector, with increased salary, which Homer accepts.
4	4	"There's No Disgrace Like Home"	Gregg Vanzo & Kent Butterworth	Al Jean & Mike Reiss	January 28, 1990	7G04	20.2
Homer takes his family to the company picnic at Mr. Burns's manor. Marge, Bart and Lisa embarrass Homer and he notices that Mr. Burns seems to favour a family who love and respect one another. Convinced that both he and his family are pathetic, Homer takes everyone to Dr. Marvin Monroe's family therapy center. When standard methods prove useless in "civilizing" them, Dr. Monroe resorts to shock therapy. Soon the Simpsons start shocking each other, causing the whole town to lose power. Dr. Monroe refunds the Simpsons.
5	5	"Bart the General"	David Silverman	John Swartzwelder	February 4, 1990	7G05	27.1
Bart runs afoul of Nelson Muntz, the school bully, who begins attacking Bart every day after school. Homer suggests fighting back, which does not work. Desperate for a solution, Bart visits Grampa for advice. Grampa takes Bart to meet Herman, who suggests that Bart rally all the school children and declare war on Nelson. Bart and his army attack Nelson and successfully manage to convince him to give up his bullying ways.
6	6	"Moaning Lisa"	Wes Archer	Al Jean & Mike Reiss	February 11, 1990	7G06	27.4
Lisa becomes depressed, which begins to affect her performance in school. Neither Marge nor Homer are able to make Lisa happier. One night, she hears distant Jazz music and sneaks out of her room to follow it. She meets Bleeding Gums Murphy, who teaches her how to express her music through the saxophone. When Marge drops Lisa off at school the next day, she suggests that Lisa smile no matter how she feels. However, Marge sees that Lisa is being denied her creativity and realizes that is what is disappointing her. Marge tells Lisa to just be herself, and the entire family go to see Murphy perform at a local Jazz club.
7	7	"The Call of the Simpsons"	Wes Archer	John Swartzwelder	February 18, 1990	7G09	27.6
Homer becomes envious of Flanders' new RV and goes to "Bob's RV Round-up" to buy one of his own. Settling on a dilapidated camper, he takes the family camping and in the process destroys the RV. Leaving Lisa and Marge behind, Bart and Homer try to find their way back to civilization, but have little luck. Later on, Homer is mistaken for Bigfoot and captured. Marge, Bart and Lisa are saved and Homer is released, although scientists say they can not determine which species he belongs to.
8	8	"The Telltale Head"	Rich Moore; Kent Butterworth (uncredited)	Al Jean, Mike Reiss, Sam Simon & Matt Groening	February 25, 1990	7G07	28.0
Bart becomes friends with Jimbo, Dolph, and Kearney, a group of local troublemakers. Trying to impress them, Bart decides to cut off and steal the head of the statue of Jebediah Springfield. The next day, the entire town grieves for the vandalized statue and Bart discovers that his new friends want to attack the vandal. Feeling remorse, Bart confesses to his family and Homer and Bart take the head back to the statue after passing through the furious people.
9	9	"Life on the Fast Lane"	David Silverman	John Swartzwelder	March 18, 1990	7G11	33.5
Having forgotten about Marge's birthday, Homer rushes to the Springfield mall and impulsively buys her a bowling ball. Marge is not impressed with the gift and after discovering that he intends to use it, she decides to spite him by going bowling herself. While at the alley, she meets Jacques, a charming French bowling instructor, who offers her lessons. Jacques begins to fall for Marge and invites her to his apartment. Although she agrees, Marge undergoes a moral dilemma. In the end, Marge visits Homer at the nuclear plant.
10	10	"Homer's Night Out"	Rich Moore	Jon Vitti	March 25, 1990	7G10	30.3
Bart purchases a mini spy camera and manages to take a picture of Homer dancing next to stripper named Princess Kashmir at a co-worker's strip club party. He gives copies of the picture to his friends, and eventually the picture starts to circulate around until eventually Marge sees it. She kicks Homer out of the house, but the next day explains that she is not upset about his dancing next to a woman, but rather that Bart saw it. She demands that he take Bart and go apologize to Princess Kashmir. Homer agrees and says he is ready to start respecting women.
11	11	"The Crepes of Wrath"	Wes Archer & Milton Gray	George Meyer, Sam Simon, John Swartzwelder & Jon Vitti	April 15, 1990	7G13	31.2
Principal Skinner finally becomes fed up with Bart's pranks and proposes that Bart be sent to France as part of the student exchange program. The family agrees and Bart is sent to the "beautiful" Château Maison, which is actually a dilapidated farmhouse on a neglected vineyard. Bart is treated like a slave by two unscrupulous winemakers, César and Ugolin, who eventually feed him wine tainted with antifreeze. Meanwhile, an Albanian boy named Adil starts to live with the Simpsons. Unbeknownst to Homer, Adil is a spy sent by his country to obtain nuclear blueprints from the Nuclear Plant, and is secretly faxing them home. Back in France, Bart learns French and reports the winemakers' crimes to the police. Adil is caught by the FBI and deported.
12	12	"Krusty Gets Busted"	Brad Bird	Jay Kogen & Wallace Wolodarsky	April 29, 1990	7G12	30.4
While buying ice cream at the Kwik-E-Mart, Homer witnesses a robbery perpetrated by a man believed to be Krusty the Clown, host of The Krusty the Clown Show, Bart's favorite program. Krusty is sent to jail and his show is taken over by his assistant, Sideshow Bob. Bart is certain Krusty is innocent, and gathers evidence to support his claim, which he takes to "Krusty's bestest friend", Sideshow Bob. Bart realizes the robbery was actually committed by Bob, who was trying to frame Krusty. Bob is arrested and Krusty thanks Bart for saving him.
13	13	"Some Enchanted Evening"	David Silverman & Kent Butterworth	Matt Groening & Sam Simon	May 13, 1990	7G01	27.1
Marge, feeling unappreciated by Homer, calls in to Dr. Monroe's radio show, which Homer overhears at work. Homer, wanting to make it up to Marge, decides to take her to dinner at a fancy restaurant and hires a babysitter to take care of Bart and Lisa. They are sent Ms. Botz, who Bart and Lisa soon discover is actually a burglar nicknamed "The Babysitter Bandit". They are captured by Ms. Botz and tied up but eventually are freed by Maggie. Bart and Lisa capture Ms. Botz and call the police. Meanwhile, Marge and Homer return home and find Ms. Botz is tied up. Homer, unaware of her true identity, frees her and Ms. Botz makes a clean getaway just moments before the police arrive.

== Home media ==
The DVD boxset for season one was released by 20th Century Fox Home Entertainment in Region 1 (the United States and Canada) on September 25, 2001, eleven years after it had completed broadcast on television. As well as every episode from the season, the DVD release features bonus material including deleted scenes, animatics, and commentaries for every episode. The boxset had been released a day earlier in Region 4 (Australia) by 20th Century Fox Home Entertainment South Pacific. It was also released on September 24, 2001 in Region 2 (the United Kingdom). The commentaries for the first season started being recorded in late 2000. When the first season DVD was released in 2001, it quickly became the best-selling television DVD in history. It was later overtaken by the 2004 release of Chappelle's Show Season 1. As of October 19, 2004, the DVD boxset sold 1.9 million units.

The Complete First Season
Set Details			Special Features
13 episodes; 3-disc set; 1.33:1 aspect ratio; AUDIO; English 5.1 Dolby Digital; English 2.0 Dolby Surround; French 2.0 Dolby Surround; SUBTITLES; English SDH; Spanish			Optional commentaries for all 13 episodes; Original scripts for "Bart the Genius", "Bart the General", "Moaning Lisa" and "Some Enchanted Evening"; Unaired version of "Some Enchanted Evening" with Optional Commentary; Albert Brooks outtakes; BBC Special: America's First Family; ABC News: Bart T-shirt Controversy; The Tracey Ullman Show short: Good Night"; Foreign Language Clips; Life on the Fast Lane; French 2.0 Dolby Surround; Italian 2.0 Dolby Surround; Japanese 2.0 Dolby Surround; Portuguese 2.0 Dolby Surround; Spanish 2.0 Dolby Surround; Early Sketches; Stills and magazine covers
Release Dates
Region 1	Region 2	Region 4	
September 25, 2001	September 24, 2001	September 24, 2001	

== See also ==
- List of The Simpsons episodes (season 1–20)
- The Simpsons shorts
