= Bart the Genius =

- The Simpsons episode
- Episode no.: Season 1 Episode 2
- Directed by: David Silverman
- Written by: Jon Vitti
- Production code: 7G02
- Original air date: January 14, 1990
- Running time: 23 minutes

Guest appearances
- Marcia Wallace as Edna Krabappel and Ms. Melon (credited as Marsha Wallace)

Episode features
- Chalkboard gag: "I will not waste chalk" (while writing this Bart uses different chalk for each letter)
- Couch gag: The family hurries on to the couch, and Bart is flung into the air. He comes down during the shot of the TV.
- Commentary: Matt Groening; James L. Brooks; David Silverman; Jon Vitti

Episode chronology
← Previous "Simpsons Roasting on an Open Fire"	Next → "Homer's Odyssey"
- The Simpsons season 1

"Bart the Genius" is the second episode of the American animated television series The Simpsons. It originally aired on Fox in the United States on January 14, 1990. It was the first episode written by Jon Vitti. It is the show's first standard episode, as well as the first to use the signature title sequence, though this version is much different from the one subsequently used, from the second season to the twentieth season. In the episode, Bart cheats on an intelligence test and is declared a genius, so he is sent to a school for gifted children. Though he initially enjoys being treated as a genius, he begins to see the downside of his new life.

It marks the first use of Bart's catchphrase "Eat my shorts". As the second episode produced, directly after James L. Brooks' personal displeasure at the animation of "Some Enchanted Evening", the future of the series depended on how the animation turned out on this episode. The animation proved to be more to his liking and production continued.

== Plot ==
The Simpsons spend a night playing Scrabble to remind Bart that he should stimulate his brain by improving his vocabulary if he hopes to pass his intelligence test at school. After Bart cheats by inventing a nonsense word, kwyjibo – basing its definition on an insulting description of his father – Homer angrily chases after him.

At Springfield Elementary School, Bart is busted for vandalism by Principal Skinner after the class genius, Martin Prince, snitches on him. To get revenge, Bart surreptitiously switches exams with Martin. When the school psychologist, Dr. Pryor, studies the IQ test results, he labels Bart a genius. Homer and Marge enroll him in a school for academically gifted students. Neither Lisa nor Skinner are fooled by Bart's supposed genius, but Skinner is pleased that Bart no longer attends Springfield Elementary.

At the Enriched Learning Center for Gifted Children, Bart feels out of place among the other students with advanced academic skills. Ostracized by his brilliant classmates, Bart visits his former school, where his old friends reject him because of his perceived intelligence. After Bart's chemistry experiment explodes, filling the school lab with green goo, he confesses to Pryor that he switched tests with Martin. Pryor realizes that he was never a genius and has him readmitted to Springfield Elementary.

Bart returns home and admits to Homer that he cheated on the intelligence test, but he is glad they are closer than before. Homer stops his kindness and gets angry at Bart for having lied the whole time, and chases him through the house as Lisa declares that Bart is "stupid again". Bart goes into his room locking Homer out.

== Cast ==
- Dan Castellaneta as Homer Simpson and Conductor
- Julie Kavner as Marge Simpson
- Nancy Cartwright as Bart Simpson and Skinner's secretary
- Yeardley Smith as Lisa Simpson and Cecile Shapiro
- Harry Shearer as Principal Seymour Skinner, Dr. J. Loren Pryor and Mr. Prince
- Marcia Wallace as Edna Krabappel and Ms. Mellon (credited as Marsha Wallace)
- Jo Ann Harris as Richard and Lewis
- Pamela Hayden as Milhouse Van Houten, Ethan Foley and Boy
- Russi Taylor as Martin Prince, Sidney Swift and Ian

== Production ==
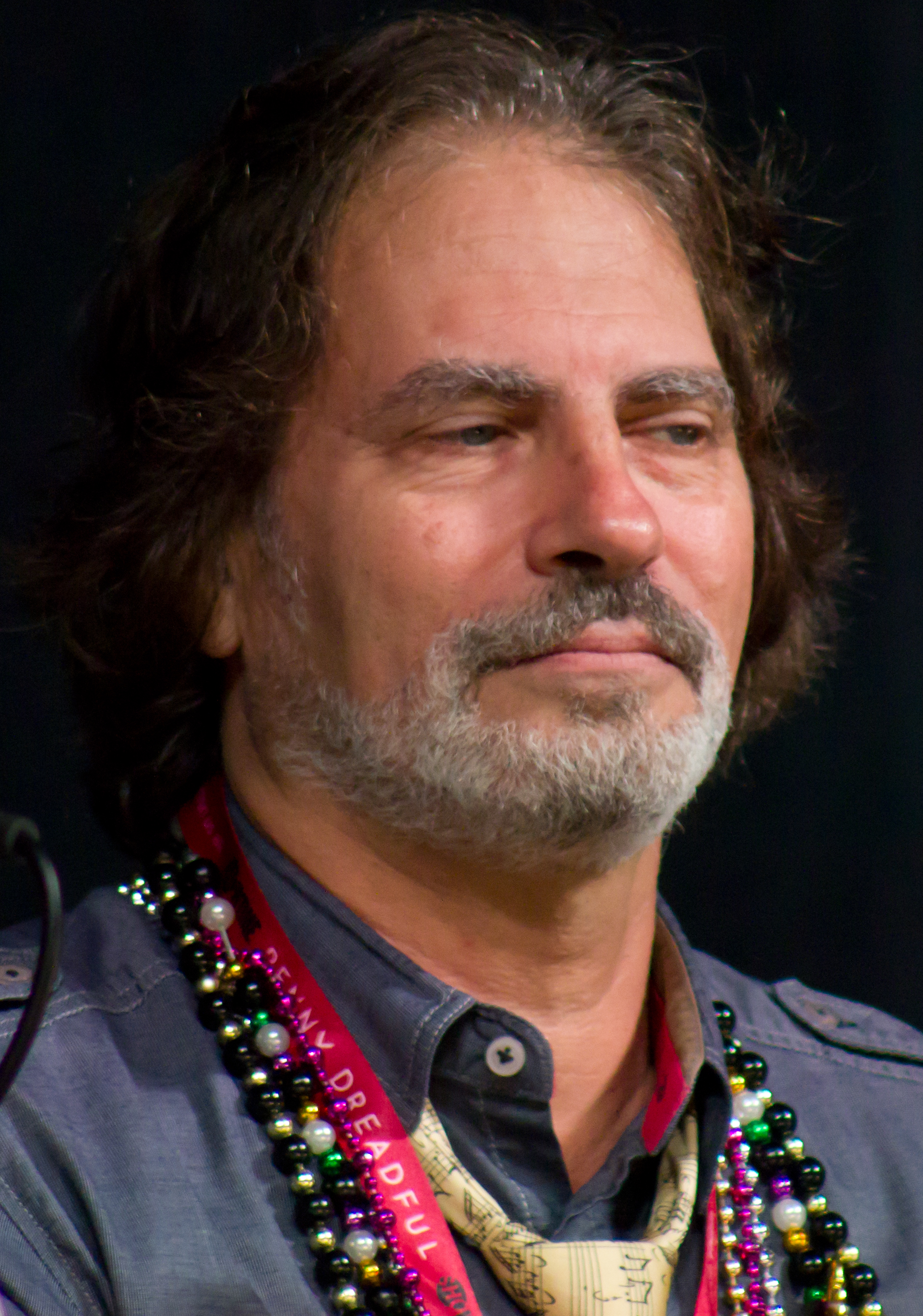
David Silverman directed the episode.

The concept for the episode developed from writer Jon Vitti coming up with a long list of bad things Bart would do for attention, imagining the potential consequences. The only idea that developed into an interesting episode concept was Bart's cheating on an IQ test. This idea was based on an incident from Vitti's childhood when a number of his classmates did not take an intelligence test seriously and suffered poor academic treatment because of it. Because Bart was already obviously unintelligent, Vitti reversed the problem for his episode. Vitti used all his memories of elementary school behavior to produce a draft script of 71 pages, substantially above the required length of about 45 pages.

It was Vitti's first script for a 30-minute television program. Prior to The Simpsons, Vitti had been a writer during Saturday Night Live's tumultuous 1985–86 season. Bart's use of the phrase "Eat my shorts" was intended to reflect his adoption of catchphrases he had heard on TV; the creative team had told Vitti that he should not come up with original taglines for the character. The scene where the family plays Scrabble was inspired by the 1985 Canadian animated short The Big Snit.

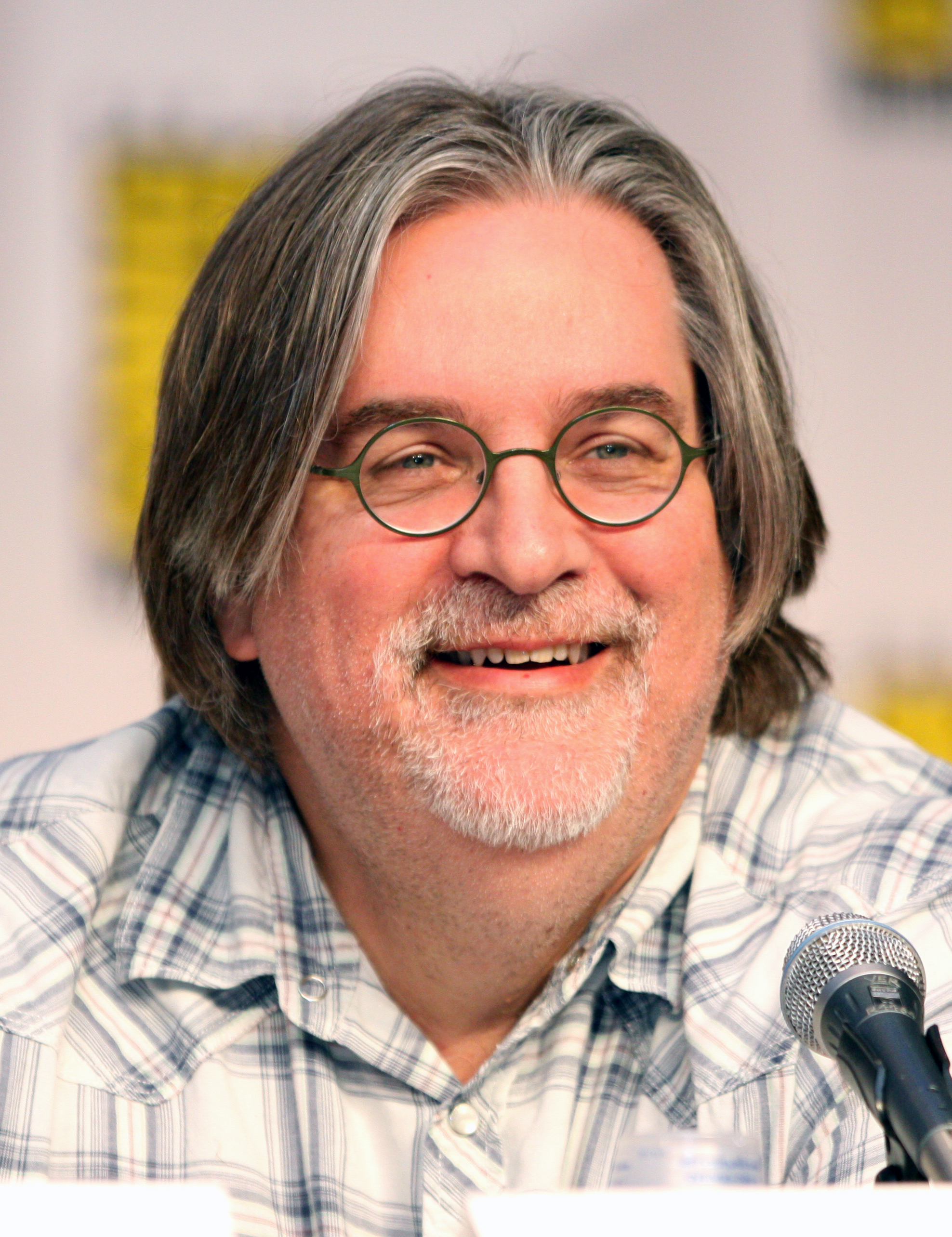
Series creator Matt Groening devised the full title sequence as a way to cut down the new animation required for each episode

Director David Silverman had difficulty devising a legible Scrabble board for the opening scene that would convey the idea that the Simpsons were able to devise only very simple words. The design of Bart's visualization of the math problem was partially inspired by the art of Saul Steinberg. The increasing appearance of numbers in that sequence derived from Silverman's use of a similar tactic when he had to develop a set design for the play The Adding Machine. Each successive scene in the sequence was shorter than the one before it by exactly one frame.

The scene where Bart writes his confession was done as one long take to balance the shorter scenes elsewhere in the episode. It was animated in the United States by Dan Haskett. There were a few problems with the finished animation for the episode. The banana in the opening scene was colored incorrectly, as the Korean animators were unfamiliar with the fruit, and the final bathtub scene was particularly problematic, including issues with lip sync. The version in the broadcast episode was the best of several attempts.

The episode was the first to feature the series' full title sequence. Creator Matt Groening developed the lengthy sequence in order to cut down on the animation necessary for each episode, but devised the two gags as compensation for the repeated material each week. In the first gag, the camera zooms in on Springfield Elementary School, where Bart can be seen writing a message on the chalkboard. This message, which changes from episode to episode, has become known as the "chalkboard gag". The other gag is known as a "couch gag", in which a twist of events occur when the family meets to sit on their couch and watch television. Groening, who had not paid much attention to television since his own childhood, was unaware that title sequences of such length were uncommon by that time. As the finished episodes became longer, the production team were reluctant to cut the stories in order to allow for the long title sequence, so shorter versions of it were developed. The episode also introduced the characters Martin Prince and his parents, Richard, Bart's teacher Edna Krabappel and Dr. J Loren Pryor.

== Cultural references ==
In the opening scene, Maggie spells EMCSQU with her blocks, a reference to Albert Einstein's mass–energy equivalence equation. A picture of Einstein also appears on the wall of Dr. Pryor's office. At one point, Homer erroneously refers to Einstein as the inventor of the light bulb. Dr. Pryor compares Bart's proposed work among ordinary children to Jane Goodall's study of chimpanzees. Goodall was pleased to be mentioned in the episode, sending the program a letter, and Vitti an autographed copy of her book. In retrospect, Vitti said he should have given the book to Al Jean who came up with the line. The conductor of the opera the family attends is named Boris Csupowski, a reference to animator Gábor Csupó. The opera attended by the family is Carmen, by French composer Georges Bizet; the song that Bart mocks is a famous aria called the Toreador Song. Students at the gifted school have lunchboxes featuring images of the 1945 novel Brideshead Revisited and chess grandmaster Anatoly Karpov.

== Reception and legacy ==
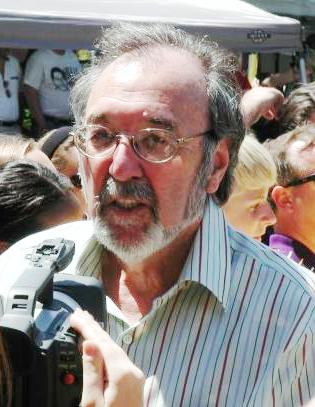
Executive producer James L. Brooks lists the episode amongst his favorites.

In its original American broadcast, "Bart the Genius" finished 47th place in the weekly ratings for the week of January 8–14, 1990 with a Nielsen rating of 12.7. It was the second-highest-rated show on Fox that week.

Since airing, the episode has received mostly positive reviews from television critics. Gary Russell and Gareth Roberts, the authors of the book I Can't Believe It's a Bigger and Better Updated Unofficial Simpsons Guide, strongly praised the episode calling it "superbly written and directed, often a literal child's-eye view of education, the first Simpsons episode proper is a classic." They went on to say, "these twenty minutes cemented Bart's position as a cultural icon and a hero to all underachievers, and managed a good few kicks at hothouse schools along the way. Especially worthy of note is the sequence where Bart visualizes his maths problem, the viewing of which should be a required part of teacher training."

In September 2001, in a DVD review of the first season, David B. Grelck rated the episode 2 1/2 (of 5) and commented that the episode was "wacky and fun, very Bart-centered, it's easy to see with this episode why Bart became the figurehead for a few years of class clowns".

Colin Jacobson at DVD Movie Guide said in a review that "Bart the Genius" "offered another decent but unspectacular episode" and "its early vintage seems clear both through the awkward animation and [through] the lack of appropriate character development."

In February 1991, in an interview, Jon Vitti described "Bart the Genius" as his favorite amongst the episodes he had written to that point. James L. Brooks also mentioned the episode amongst his favorites, saying, "We did things with animation when that happened that just opened doors for us."

The show received mail from viewers complaining that the throwing away of a comic book was an incident of censorship. The invented word "Kwyjibo" in the episode inspired the creator of the Melissa macro virus and the name of an iron oxide copper-gold deposit in Quebec.

== Home media ==
The episode was released first on home video in the United Kingdom, as part of a VHS release titled The Simpsons Collection; the episode was paired with season one episode "The Call of the Simpsons". In the United Kingdom, it was once re-released as part of the VHS boxed set of the complete first season, released in November 1999.

In the United States, the episode would finally see the home video release as a part of The Simpsons Season One DVD set, which was released on September 25, 2001. Groening, Brooks, Silverman, and Vitti participated in the DVD's audio commentary. A digital edition of the series' first season was published on December 20, 2010, in the United States containing the episode, through Amazon Video and iTunes.
