= Some Enchanted Evening (The Simpsons) =

- The Simpsons episode
- Marge giving Botzcowski advice about babysitting her children.
- Episode no.: Season 1 Episode 13
- Directed by: David Silverman; Kent Butterworth
- Written by: Matt Groening; Sam Simon
- Production code: 7G01
- Original air date: May 13, 1990

Guest appearances
- Penny Marshall as Ms. Botz; June Foray as the Rubber Baby Buggy Bumpers Babysitting Service Receptionist and Doofy the Elf; Paul Willson as a Florist

Episode features
- Chalkboard gag: "I will not yell 'Fire' in a crowded classroom."
- Couch gag: The family comes in and just sits on the couch in a normal manner.
- Commentary: Matt Groening; James L. Brooks; Al Jean; David Silverman

Episode chronology
← Previous "Krusty Gets Busted"	Next → "Bart Gets an 'F'"
- The Simpsons season 1

"Some Enchanted Evening" is the thirteenth and final episode of the first season of the American animated television series The Simpsons. It was originally broadcast on Fox in the United States on May 13, 1990. A family drama, it had a very long delayed release. Written by Matt Groening and Sam Simon, initially planned under Kent Butterworth and finished by David Silverman, "Some Enchanted Evening" was the first episode produced for season one and was intended to air as the series premiere in fall 1989, but aired as the season one finale due to animation problems. The Christmas special "Simpsons Roasting on an Open Fire" premiered in its place on December 17, 1989. It is the last episode to feature the original opening sequence starting from "Bart the Genius". In the episode, Homer and Marge go on a night out while leaving the children under the care of a diabolical babysitter named Ms. Lucille "Botz" Botzcowski, who is found to be a wanted criminal.

Penny Marshall provided the voice of Ms. Botz. The episode features cultural references to such films as The Night of the Hunter and Psycho as well as a musical reference to A Star Is Born.

Since its initial broadcast, the episode has received mixed reviews. It acquired a Nielsen rating of 15.4 and was the highest-rated show on the Fox network the week it aired.

== Plot ==
Marge is depressed that Homer, Bart, Lisa, and even Maggie take her for granted. Marge phones Dr. Marvin Monroe's call-in therapy radio slot. Listening to the call at work, Homer feels bad when Marge reveals his name on the radio. After work, he visits Moe's Tavern, where Moe advises him to give Marge a rose and a box of chocolates. Marge's mood softens and Homer invites her to go dancing, dine at a fancy restaurant, and spend the night at a motel.

Marge and Homer hire Ms. Botz through a babysitting service to watch the kids, after the receptionist originally rejected Marge's request and then Homer called the service himself using the surname Sampson. Botz puts Maggie to bed while Bart and Lisa watch The Happy Little Elves. After Bart changes the television to America's Most Armed and Dangerous, Bart and Lisa scream in horror when they realize that Botz is a wanted burglar, dubbed the 'Babysitter Bandit'. Realizing her cover is blown, she prevents them from escaping and calling for help. Botz ties up the kids (and gags Bart's mouth with tape) and packs the family's possessions into her suitcases. Maggie wakes up, goes downstairs and finds Bart and Lisa; they try to get her attention, but she focuses on the Happy Little Elves. As the video ends, Maggie attempts to watch it again, and Lisa tells her she can if she unties her and Bart. While Ms. Botz is still cleaning up, she sees that Maggie is out of her crib. Bart lures Ms. Botz into his room, and knocks her out with a baseball bat.

Realizing Botz cut the telephone line, the kids go to a local phone booth and call the producers of America's Most Armed and Dangerous. When Marge and Homer are unable to reach Ms. Botz by phone, they return home early to find her bound and gagged. Unaware she is a wanted criminal, Homer and Marge free her and pay her handsomely. She flees just as the kids arrive with the police and news reporters. Homer, thinking this is one of their naughty tricks, quickly grabs Bart, saying how he and Marge had untied her. However, reporters tell him that Ms. Botz is a wanted criminal. Realizing his blunder, he lies to the media, and thinking all that hard work was for nothing, Homer is embarrassed. When a television newscast identifies him as a 'local boob', Marge assures him he must be doing something right if he raised three children who can hogtie a stranger, making Homer feel better.

== Production ==
Even though this episode aired as the season finale of the first season, it was the first episode in production and was intended to be the first episode to air from the half-hour show. The Simpsons is a spin-off from The Tracey Ullman Show in which the family already appeared in a series of animated one-minute shorts. The characters were already created, but had to be further developed in order to carry a half-hour show. The episode was therefore meant as an introduction to the characters. The Simpsons creator Matt Groening and writer/producer Sam Simon (of such television series as Cheers) wrote the script for the episode. Both Groening and Simon are credited with developing the series, along with executive producer James L. Brooks. The name "Ms. Botz" was based on a real person who had once babysat Groening.

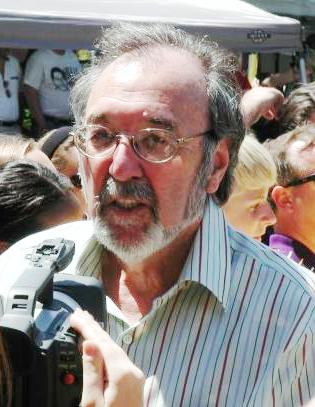
James L. Brooks strongly criticized the initial version of the episode

The episode was first directed by Kent Butterworth. Klasky Csupo, the animation studio that produced the earlier Simpsons shorts, was in charge of the animation, with one exception. During the years of producing the shorts, everything was created in-house. As a budgetary consideration, production was subcontracted to South Korean animation studio AKOM. While character and background layout was done in Los Angeles, inbetweening, coloring and filming is done by the overseas studio. A debacle erupted when this episode, the first to return from Korea, was screened in front of the production staff at the Gracie Films bungalow. Brooks' initial reaction to the animation was "This is shit." Afterward the room almost cleared. A heated argument ensued between Brooks and Klasky-Csupo animation studio head Gábor Csupó, who denied there was anything wrong with the animation and suggested that the real problem was the quality of the show's writing.

The producers felt the animation did not exhibit a distinct style envisioned for the show. At the time, there were only a few choices for animation style; usually, animators would follow the styles of Disney, Warner Bros., or Hanna-Barbera. Disney and Warner Bros. cartoons tended to be set in pliable universes in which the characters and environments seemed to be made of rubber. By contrast, the showrunners wanted a realistic environment in which the characters and objects could not do anything that was not possible in the real world, but one example of AKOM's early work was their animation of doors with the rubber effect that they wanted to avoid. Meanwhile, Hanna-Barbera's style relied on exaggerated sound effects, which they did not want to use either.

The producers considered aborting the series if the next episode, "Bart the Genius", turned out as this episode. Fortunately, it turned out to suffer only a few easily fixed problems. Afterward, they entreated Fox to postpone the series premiere for several months. The premiere then switched to "Simpsons Roasting on an Open Fire" which had to be aired in December being a Christmas special. This ensured more time could be spent fixing the animation problems and rewriting much of this episode. Directorial retakes were handled by David Silverman, who already had considerable experience directing the shorts. Silverman estimates that about 70% of everything had to be redone. Most of these retakes consisted of changing the backgrounds. The result is an episode where the animation is uneven because it shifts between the early animation and the retakes. It is still possible to see the doors slam like they were made of rubber. The Fox censors wanted to replace the sentence "the blue thing with the things", which they believed to be too sexual. Due to the fledgling position of the Fox network, Brooks had obtained an unusual contractual provision that ensured the network could not interfere with the creative process by providing show notes, so the showrunners simply ignored the censors.

The episode featured several early character designs; Moe Szyslak has black hair in this episode, which was later changed to gray, while Barney Gumble has yellow hair, which was later changed to brown in order to differentiate the character's hair color from that of his skin. Because of the delayed broadcast, there are also a few continuity errors. Santa's Little Helper, for example, does not appear in this episode, despite being introduced in "Simpsons Roasting on an Open Fire". Hank Azaria was at the time credited as a guest star for portraying Maître d'. In this episode, Moe Szyslak was originally voiced by Christopher Collins, but when Hank Azaria came up with his version, they decided to have Hank Azaria replace Christopher Collins as the voice of Moe in all later appearances. Azaria became a regular cast member in the second season.

Ms. Botz's pursuit of Bart into the cellar is reminiscent of Robert Mitchum's pursuit of a young boy in the film The Night of the Hunter. Moe's Tavern plays "The Man That Got Away" from the 1954 remake of A Star Is Born directed by George Cukor and starring Judy Garland and James Mason. Before the episode aired, Ms. Botz voice-over Penny Marshall had worked with Brooks on some shows he made in the 1970s. This relationship included her being a regular cast member on Friends and Lovers and having three guest appearances on The Mary Tyler Moore Show.

The scene of Ms. Botz handing Bart the Happy Little Elves VHS and telling him that he, Lisa, and Maggie were going to watch it or else was animated by Dan Haskett, who had previously animated the scene of Bart's confession in the episode "Bart the Genius".

== Reception ==
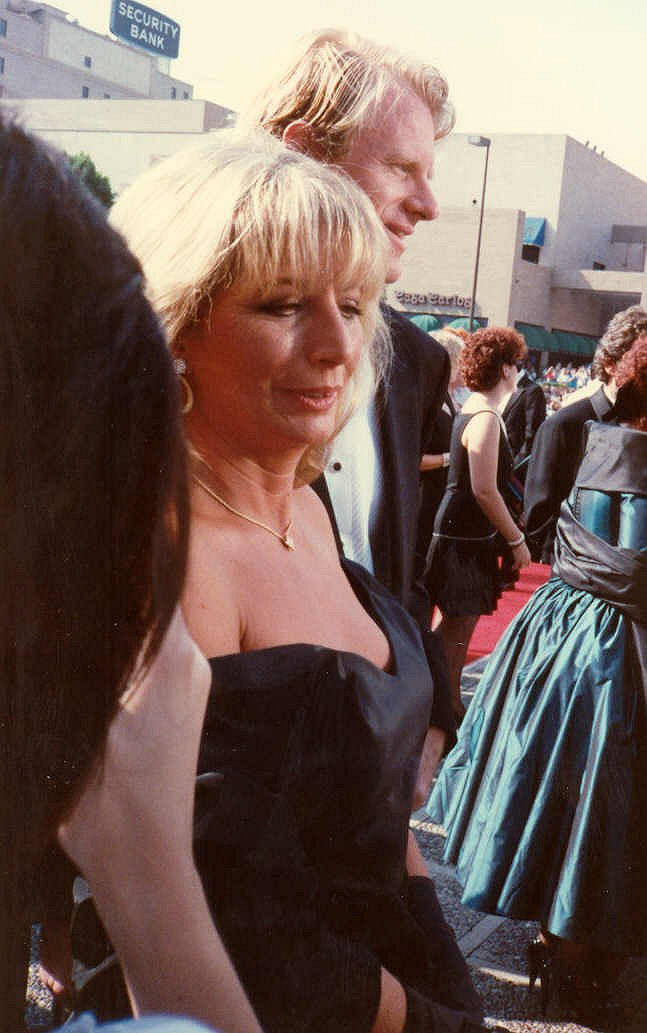
Penny Marshall was named one of AOL's 25 favorite guest stars.

In its original broadcast, "Some Enchanted Evening" finished 12th for the week in the Nielsen ratings with a rating of 15.4, being seen by approximately 14.2 million homes. The episode was the highest-rated show on Fox that week.

Since airing, the episode has received mixed reviews from television critics. The authors of the book I Can't Believe It's a Bigger and Better Updated Unofficial Simpsons Guide, Gary Russell and Gareth Roberts, said: "It's quite a shock to discover that this confident, fully rounded episode was the first to be made. The perfect template." Colin Jacobson at DVD Movie Guide said it was "a reasonably good episode" and added: "Still, it's an awkward piece and not one I enjoyed a great deal. To be sure, 'Evening' was generally entertaining, but it's nothing special." In a DVD review of the first season, David B. Grelck rated the episode a 1 1/2 (of 5).

According to Al Jean, viewers thought this episode was the best episode of the first season after the season ended. However, in 2006, IGN named "The Crepes of Wrath" the best episode of the first season. Penny Marshall, who played Ms. Botz, ranked on AOL's list of their favorite 25 Simpsons guest stars.
