= Moaning Lisa (The Simpsons) =

- The Simpsons episode
- Episode no.: Season 1 Episode 6
- Directed by: Wesley Meyer "Bud" Archer
- Written by: Al Jean; Mike Reiss
- Production code: 7G06
- Original air date: February 11, 1990

Guest appearances
- Ron Taylor as Oscar "Bleeding Gums" Murphy; Miriam Flynn as Miss Barr

Episode features
- Chalkboard gag: "I will not instigate revolution"
- Couch gag: The Simpsons pile on to the couch, Maggie pops up in the air and Marge catches her. (This is also the gag used in The Simpsons arcade game.)
- Commentary: Matt Groening; Wes Archer; Al Jean; Mike Reiss

Episode chronology
← Previous "Bart the General"	Next → "The Call of the Simpsons"
- The Simpsons season 1

"Moaning Lisa" is the sixth episode of the American animated television series The Simpsons. It originally aired on Fox in the United States on February 11, 1990. The episode was written by Al Jean and Mike Reiss, and was directed by Wes Archer. Ron Taylor guest stars in the episode as Oscar "Bleeding Gums" Murphy. The episode deals with Lisa's depression and her attempts to sublimate it by playing her saxophone.

== Plot ==
Lisa wakes up one morning in a deep depression. At school, she gets in trouble with her music teacher for improvising and becomes reluctant to play dodgeball in gym. At home, Homer and Bart pummel each other at video boxing, but despite Homer's attempts, he is unable to defeat Bart.

Homer and Marge try to cheer Lisa up, but she is consumed with existentialism and worry over all the suffering in the world. In her room, Lisa hears music coming from outside her window. She follows the music through town and meets Oscar "Bleeding Gums" Murphy, a soulful saxophonist playing the blues. Lisa learns about expressing herself through her music from him, only to be discovered and whisked away by Marge.

Homer goes to the arcade and enlists the help of an arcade boxing expert, while Marge, who is still upset at Lisa for sneaking out the night before, takes her to band practice. She tells Lisa to smile no matter how she feels inside, to suppress her emotions to be popular, and that happiness will follow.

But when she sees Lisa hiding her true feelings and being taken advantage of by her classmates and her music teacher, Marge changes her tune and tells Lisa to be herself. Her support helps Lisa to feel genuinely happy. When Homer returns home, he is about to defeat Bart in a rematch but Marge unplugs the game console to announce Lisa's recovery, while Bart declares his retirement as an undefeated video boxing champ. Later, the Simpsons visit a jazz club to hear Bleeding Gums Murphy sing a blues number written by Lisa.

== Cast ==
- Dan Castellaneta as Homer Simpson
- Julie Kavner as Marge Simpson and Jacqueline Bouvier
- Nancy Cartwright as Bart Simpson and Boy #1
- Yeardley Smith as Lisa Simpson
- Harry Shearer as Mr. Largo, News announcer and Clerk
- Hank Azaria as Moe Szyslak
- Susan Blu as Howie and Boy #2
- Miriam Flynn as Miss Barr
- Pamela Hayden as Janey Powell, Boy with Howie and Howie's mother
- Ron Taylor as Oscar "Bleeding Gums" Murphy

== Production ==
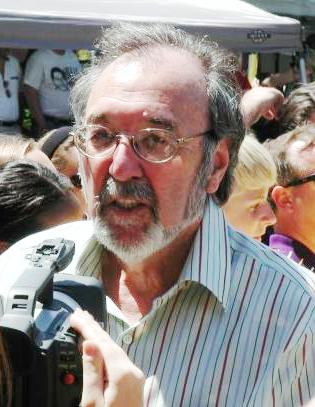
The idea for "Moaning Lisa" was suggested by James L. Brooks.

"Moaning Lisa" was the first episode of the series to focus on the character of Lisa Simpson. The idea for it was suggested by The Simpsons producer James L. Brooks, who wanted to do an episode where Lisa was sad but she did not know why. The writers also felt they had done several "jokey" episodes on the show and wanted to try something new that was "really emotional and sweet".

While writers Al Jean and Mike Reiss were initially thrilled to write an episode pitched by Brooks, for whom they had deep admiration, they were unsure that the depression-themed episode would work. Series creator Matt Groening taunted the pair for having been assigned the episode, while producer Sam Simon told them that Brooks had been trying to get such an episode made since Taxi. According to Reiss, the episode establishes Lisa as a character, as in his and Jean's previous episode "There's No Disgrace Like Home", she is as badly behaved as Bart.

The song Lisa sings in this episode later reappeared in expanded form on The Simpsons Sing the Blues CD. Mr. Largo, Lisa's music teacher, was partly inspired by a music teacher Groening had as a child. The designs of the boxers in the video game Homer and Bart play were loosely based on Homer and Bart, and the referee in the game was based on a character from Matt Groening's Life in Hell comic strip. "Bleeding Gums" Murphy was loosely based on the famous blues musician Blind Lemon Jefferson. Ralph Wiggum, "Bleeding Gums" Murphy, and Jacqueline Bouvier (during Marge's childhood flashback) all make their first (going by production order rather than airdate) appearances on The Simpsons in this episode.

== Reception ==
In its original American broadcast, "Moaning Lisa" finished 34th place in the weekly ratings for the week of February 5–11, 1990 with a Nielsen rating of 13.8. It was the highest-rated show on Fox that week.

The authors of the book I Can't Believe It's a Bigger and Better Updated Unofficial Simpsons Guide, Gary Russell and Gareth Roberts, said: "Certain scenes of this, the most syrupy of Simpsons episodes, sent viewers raised on the later seasons scurrying to the bathroom. Yes, the final moments may give you goosepimples, and are a world away from the anti-schmaltz normally associated with the series, but there is still much to recommend here. In fact, the Homer–Bart subplot is more successful than the main storyline; Homer's nightmare about their relationship is genuinely disturbing."

In a DVD review of the first season, David B. Grelck rated the episode a 2 1/2 (of 5) and added: "Lisa develops much of her future personality in this episode. The family dynamic is starting to fall into place, as is the relationship between Homer and Lisa."

Colin Jacobson at DVD Movie Guide said in a review that "overall, this was a pretty drab episode" and added that "it had some moments, such as the videogame boxing matches between Homer and Bart, but Lisa lacked the strength at this point to carry an entire show".

Yeardley Smith, the voice actress of Lisa, has cited the episode as one of her favorite Simpsons episodes of all time.

In his 2018 memoir Springfield Confidential, Mike Reiss named the episode as one of four that broke new ground, alongside "Like Father, Like Clown", "Homer at the Bat" and the original "Treehouse of Horror".

== Home media ==
The episode was released first on home video in the United Kingdom, as part of a VHS release titled The Simpsons Collection; the episode was paired with season one episode "Homer's Odyssey". It was released in the US on the VHS release The Best of The Simpsons, Vol. 2 (1997), paired with "Bart the General". In the United States, it was later re released in a collector's edition boxed set of the first three volumes of The Best of The Simpsons collections.

In the United Kingdom, it was re released as part of a VHS boxed set of the complete first season, in November 1999. The episode's début on the DVD format was as a part of The Simpsons season one DVD set, which was released on September 25, 2001. Groening, Reiss, Archer, and Jean participated in the DVD's audio commentary. A digital edition of the series' first season, including the episode, was published December 20, 2010 in the United States through Amazon Video and iTunes.
