= Ron Taylor (actor) =

American actor, singer and writer (1952–2002)

- Taylor as Coach Wingate in Twin Peaks
- Born: Ronald James Taylor; October 16, 1952; Galveston, Texas, U.S.
- Died: January 16, 2002 (aged 49); Los Angeles, California, U.S.
- Occupations: Actor, singer and writer
- Years active: 1977–2002
- Spouse: DeBorah Sharpe (m. 1980)
- Children: 1

Ronald James Taylor (October 16, 1952 – January 16, 2002) was an American actor, singer and writer. He grew up in Galveston, Texas, and later moved to New York City to attend the American Academy of Dramatic Arts. After graduating, Taylor began working in musical theater, appearing in The Wiz (1977), before getting his break with the 1982 off-Broadway production Little Shop of Horrors. Taylor voiced the killer plant Audrey II in the show, which ran for five years and over 2,000 performances.

Taylor created and starred in the musical revue It Ain't Nothin' But the Blues, which charted the history of blues music from its African origin to American success. Originally performed at high schools in Denver as a 45-minute piece, the revue was expanded to two hours, played around the country and opened on Broadway in 1999. It was met with critical acclaim, ran for eight months, and saw Taylor receive two Tony Award nominations.

He also had numerous television roles, appearing in Family Matters, The Simpsons, Twin Peaks, Star Trek: Deep Space Nine, Ally McBeal, Matlock and L.A. Law. His performance in the latter, as a singer who performed the American national anthem "The Star-Spangled Banner" at baseball games, led him to perform the anthem at several real-life sporting events. Taylor was married and had one son. He died in January 2002 after suffering a heart attack.

== Early life ==
Taylor was born on October 16, 1952, in Galveston, Texas to Marian and Robert "Bruno" Taylor and had two sisters, Roberta and Frances. He attended O'Connell High School, and Wharton County Junior College, where he was a football player, and a participant in the school choir and theater. The choir teacher suggested he join after overhearing him singing The Temptations. He favoured music over football, and at the age of 19 attended the American Academy of Dramatic Arts in New York, intending to become a singer.

== Career ==
=== Theater ===
==== Early theater work ====
"Being in the box bothered me at first, because I am used to being on stage, and when you sing on stage, there is open space; you can throw your voice all the way to the end of the house. When you are in that small space, it plays a psychological trick on you. You feel you have nowhere to sing to. I had to keep telling myself: 'O.K., I have a microphone right here, I don't have to push. They can hear me.' You know I can't hear anything in there. I can't hear applause."

—Taylor on his role in Little Shop of Horrors.

Taylor, a "barrel-chested bass-baritone", had an extensive career in musical theater. Upon graduating from the American Academy of Dramatic Arts, Taylor was unable to read sheet music and could "barely" play the piano, but found work as a singer. In 1977 he played the Cowardly Lion in a national touring production of The Wiz. Taylor subsequently played Great Big Baby in the 1978 Broadway production Eubie! and Caiaphas in a performance of Jesus Christ Superstar.

He voiced Audrey II, the "street-smart, funky, conniving" talking killer plant which is an "anthropomorphic cross between a Venus flytrap and an avocado", in the original off-Broadway production of Howard Ashman and Alan Menken's "black-comedy musical" Little Shop of Horrors from 1982. Audrey II was played by four increasingly large puppets, operated by Martin P. Robinson, while Taylor sat in a box at the back of the stage to voice the role, standing to perform his musical numbers. The two kept in close proximity to ensure "that voice and action are always synchronized" and "developed a rapport" which was "the only thing that allow[ed] the character to really bloom." Taylor disliked sitting in the box as it left him feeling disconnected from the audience. The part was his break and was described by Jesse McKinley of The New York Times as "a role Mr. Taylor's booming voice was made for...[he] soon put his stamp on Audrey's signature line: 'Feed me, feed me!'" Members of the public often used the line when they saw Taylor. Little Shop of Horrors was performed over 2000 times before it closed in 1987. At the 1983 Drama Desk Awards, Taylor won the award for Outstanding Special Effects for his performance, which he shared with Robinson.

In the 1984 Broadway production of The Three Musketeers at The Broadway Theatre, Taylor played Porthos, one of the three title characters. After fifteen preview performances, the show ran just nine times before closing. Frank Rich wrote that the musketeers were "professionally played" by Taylor and his co-stars Brent Spiner and Chuck Wagner but felt the three had "little dialogue and often seem like interchangeable stand-ins for the Three Stooges." A similar view was held by William B. Collins of the Philadelphia Inquirer who said they "speak as in one voice and behave like comedians who have been stranded without good material."

==== It Ain't Nothin' But the Blues ====
Taylor created and starred in the musical revue It Ain't Nothin' But the Blues, which charted the history of blues music from its African origin to American success. He conceived the original idea for the show when he played blues musician Rufus Payne in a 1987 production of Lost Highway, a play about singer Hank Williams at the Denver Center for the Performing Arts in Denver, Colorado. He proposed the idea to director Randal Myler who eventually accepted it in 1994. Taylor co-wrote the revue with Myler, Lita Gaithers, Charles Bevel and Dan Wheetman, and also served as its associate producer. Taylor was the revue's lead singer and acted as its narrator; his numbers included "I'm Your Hoochie Coochie Man", "The Thrill is Gone", "Blues Man" and "Let the Good Times Roll". It was initially performed as a 45-minute production at 25 local high schools. Because of their positive reception, the show was expanded to two hours and 50 songs, with three people being added to the original cast of four, and was regularly performed at the Denver Center.

Taylor described the performance as "very cordial", with the audience close to performers, and that "one show is never the same as the next because of the songs, of what they are. Blues is about how you feel today. One day, you're down; another day is real happy and giddy. We're all laughing. Randy's direction captures that. It's always so personal, bringing the audience into the piece." As well as African music, the revue includes "country, gospel, the old blues, Appalachian music," featuring music by Patsy Cline, Brenda Lee, Mahalia Jackson, Jimmy Rogers, Nina Simone and Muddy Waters.

In 1995, the revue ran for a month at the Cleveland Play House, in conjunction with the opening of the Rock and Roll Hall of Fame and Museum, before touring at other regional theaters. It played at the Crossroads Theatre in New Jersey for seven weeks in November 1998 and opened off-Broadway at New York's New Victory Theater in March 1999, presented by Crossroads Theatre, in association with San Diego Repertory Theatre and Alabama Shakespeare Festival. It was met with critical and audience acclaim and the following month moved to Broadway to the Vivian Beaumont Theater. New York Times critic Lawrence Van Gelder wrote that the show had a "cornucopia of splendidly interpreted song," and "is a potent blend of visual eloquence and historical sweep that engages the eye and touches the heart while its songs soothe the ear, occasionally work mischief on the funny bone, and always raise the spirits."

A week after opening at the Beaumont, the show received four Tony Award nominations, with Taylor being nominated for Best Performance by a Featured Actor in a Musical and Best Book of a Musical. The cast's performance on the live Tony Awards show on CBS was bumped due to limited time, sparking controversy, costing the show potential revenue, and damaging its prospects for survival. The cast performed two days later on the CBS talkshow Late Show with David Letterman, while media attention and radio coverage of the Tony snub boosted the show's takings for the following two weeks. This did not last and did not "build a long-lasting audience like the Tonys could", leading to dwindling attendance. A large word-of-mouth networking campaign to advertise the performance was set up by the producers and the show moved to the Ambassador Theatre, where the box office takes began to break even. The show closed in January 2000 after a total run of eight months on Broadway.

For the rest of the year, It Ain't Nothin' But the Blues again toured at regional theaters, running in Atlanta, San Diego, and the John F. Kennedy Center for the Performing Arts in Washington, D.C., and returning to New York in August 2000 at the B.B. King Blues Club and Grill for a month-long run. Jim Trageser of The Press-Enterprise, in a review of one of the San Diego performances, praised Taylor, saying he "has the lung power to simply take over any show, especially his own" and "shows surprising grace and athleticism as well as the kind of leonine masculinity that certain big men (Orson Welles, Babe Ruth) possess". Trageser also praised the writing, calling it "a superb job not only of selecting the songs, but in choosing arrangements that blow away all the cobwebs history has laid on many of them."

It Ain't Nothin' But the Blues was the longest-running show Taylor appeared in, as well as his final Broadway appearance. Taylor planned an IMAX film version of the production; and nine years after his death, it was revived by the New Harlem Arts Theater at the Aaron Davis Hall on the City College of New York campus.

=== Film, television and music ===
Taylor had numerous television roles. He voiced jazz musician "Bleeding Gums" Murphy on The Simpsons, appearing in the first season episode "Moaning Lisa" (1990) and returning for the character's death in the season six episode "'Round Springfield" (1995). He was one of the first people to guest star on the show. Taylor was supposed to reprise his role in the season two episode "Dancin' Homer", but was in New York and unable to record his part. Keith Phipps of The A.V. Club said the role gave Taylor "television immortality". He also reprised the role on a recording of Billie Holiday's song "God Bless the Child" on the 1990 The Simpsons' album The Simpsons Sing the Blues. He appeared as a Klingon chef in Star Trek: Deep Space Nine, and played wrestling instructor Coach Wingate in Twin Peaks. Other television roles included guest spots on NYPD Blue, ER, Profiler, Family Matters, Home Improvement and Ally McBeal. Taylor also had a recurring part in the 2000 series City of Angels, and played a blues singer in a two-part episode of Matlock, a role that was written for him. He also appeared in more than 20 films. These included Trading Places, Amos & Andrew, A Rage in Harlem (as Hank), The Mighty Quinn and Rush Hour 2.

After a 1991 appearance on the series L.A. Law, on which he played a singer sacked by a baseball team for "embellish[ing]" his performances of the American national anthem "The Star-Spangled Banner", Taylor received several invitations to sing it before sports events, although never expected anything to happen when he had taken the part. He sang it before the Major League Baseball game between the Baltimore Orioles and Detroit Tigers on July 1, 1991. His rendition did not mimic that of his character: "the song is self-explanatory. I'm just going to sing the song straightforwardly and that's that." Taylor received travel and accommodation expenses but no other payment for his performance. He also sang for a Los Angeles Kings National Hockey League game, and on August 5, 1995, he sang the anthem before the MLB match between the Cleveland Indians and Chicago White Sox.

Taylor was part of the blues group The Nervis Bros and performed across the United States. He also sang with Billy Joel, Bruce Springsteen, Etta James, Slash and Sheila E.

== Personal life ==
Taylor met DeBorah Sharpe in 1977 during the production of The Wiz where she was the understudy for Dorothy. They married in 1980 and had a son, Adamah. In his spare time, Taylor often helped teach vulnerable young people through a variety of projects, including at the George Street Playhouse in New Jersey. He noted "things have come out of the air for me...I'm grateful; that's why I work with kids. I've had a blessing in my career, to have gone as far as I've gone." A 1995 piece in The Plain Dealer described Taylor as "A jolly giant of a man, he looks like a natural force – a mountain, perhaps, who can tell great stories." Taylor was a Christian.

Taylor suffered a small stroke in 1999; he was able to perform again in It Ain't Nothin' But the Blues 73 days later. He died from a heart attack at his home in Los Angeles on January 16, 2002, at the age of 49. His funeral took place on January 28 at the New Christ Memorial Church of God in Christ.

== Filmography ==
=== Films ===
Year	Title	Role	Notes
1983	Trading Places	Big Black Guy	
1984	The Ice Pirates	Pimp Robot	Voice; uncredited
1984	Exterminator 2	Dude	
1987	Who's That Girl	1st Dock Worker	
1988	Astronomy	Johnny's Dad	Short film
1988	Dead Heat	Shoot Out Zombie	
1989	The Mighty Quinn	Officer McKeon	
1989	Collision Course	Auto Worker At Bowling Alley #2	
1989	Relentless	Captain Blakely	
1989	Second Sight	Carl	
1990	Heart Condition	Bubba	
1990	Downtown	Bruce Tucker	
1990	Masters of Menace	Man At Door	
1991	A Rage in Harlem	Hank	
1991	Rover Dangerfield	Mugsy / Bruno	Voice
1992	There Goes the Neighborhood	Bubble Man	
1993	Amos & Andrew	Sherman	
1993	Deadfall	The Baby	
2002	Ritual	Superintendent Archibald	(final film role)

=== Television ===
Year	Title	Role	Notes
1984	Robert Klein: Child of the 50s, Man of the 80s	Irving	Television special
1984	My Little Pony: Rescue at Midnight Castle	Scorpan	Television special; voice
1984	Miami Vice	Linus Oliver	Episode: "Calderone's Return: The Hit List (Part 1)"
1984	3-2-1 Contact	Pawn Shop Owner	Episode: "Space: Living There"
1988	Night Court	Attendant Cal	Episode: "Fire"
1989	Wiseguy	Monroe Blue	2 episodes
1989-1990	Matlock	Deacon Holmes / Tyler Mullins	4 episodes
1990	China Beach	Mess Sergeant	Episode: "Warriors"
1990	Quantum Leap	Papa David Harper	Episode: "Black And White On Fire"
1990-1993	Family Matters	Darnell Coleman / Pastor Peebles	3 episodes
1990–1991	Twin Peaks	Coach Wingate	2 episodes
1990–1995	The Simpsons	"Bleeding Gums" Murphy (voice)	Episodes: "Moaning Lisa" and "'Round Springfield"
1991	Amen	"String Bean"	Episode: "Ernie and the Sublimes"
1991	L.A. Law	Elliot "The Wompman" Miller	Episode: "On the Toad Again"
1991	Fever	Merton	Television film
1991	Home Improvement	Kyle	Episode: "Nothing More Than Feelings"
1992	Vinnie & Bobby	Stanley	3 episodes
1992	Batman: The Animated Series	Orderly (voice)	Episode: "Dreams in Darkness"; voice
1993	Lush Life	The Clerk	Television film
1993	A Cool Like That Christmas	Reverend	Television film
1993-1997	NYPD Blue	Prisoner #1 / Bus Driver	2 episodes
1993–1994	Star Trek: Deep Space Nine	Klingon Chef	Episodes: "Melora" and "Playing God"
1994	In the Line of Duty: The Price of Vengeance	Reddick	Television film
1994	The George Carlin Show	Norman	Episode: "George Goes on a Date: Part 1"
1994	ER	Bob	Episode: "Hit and Run"
1998	Profiler	"Fat Cat"	Episode: "Ties That Bind"
1999	Ally McBeal	Singer In Bar	Episode: "Saving Santa"
2000	City of Angels	Lester Bell	3 episodes
