= David Silverman (animator) =

American animator and director (born 1957)

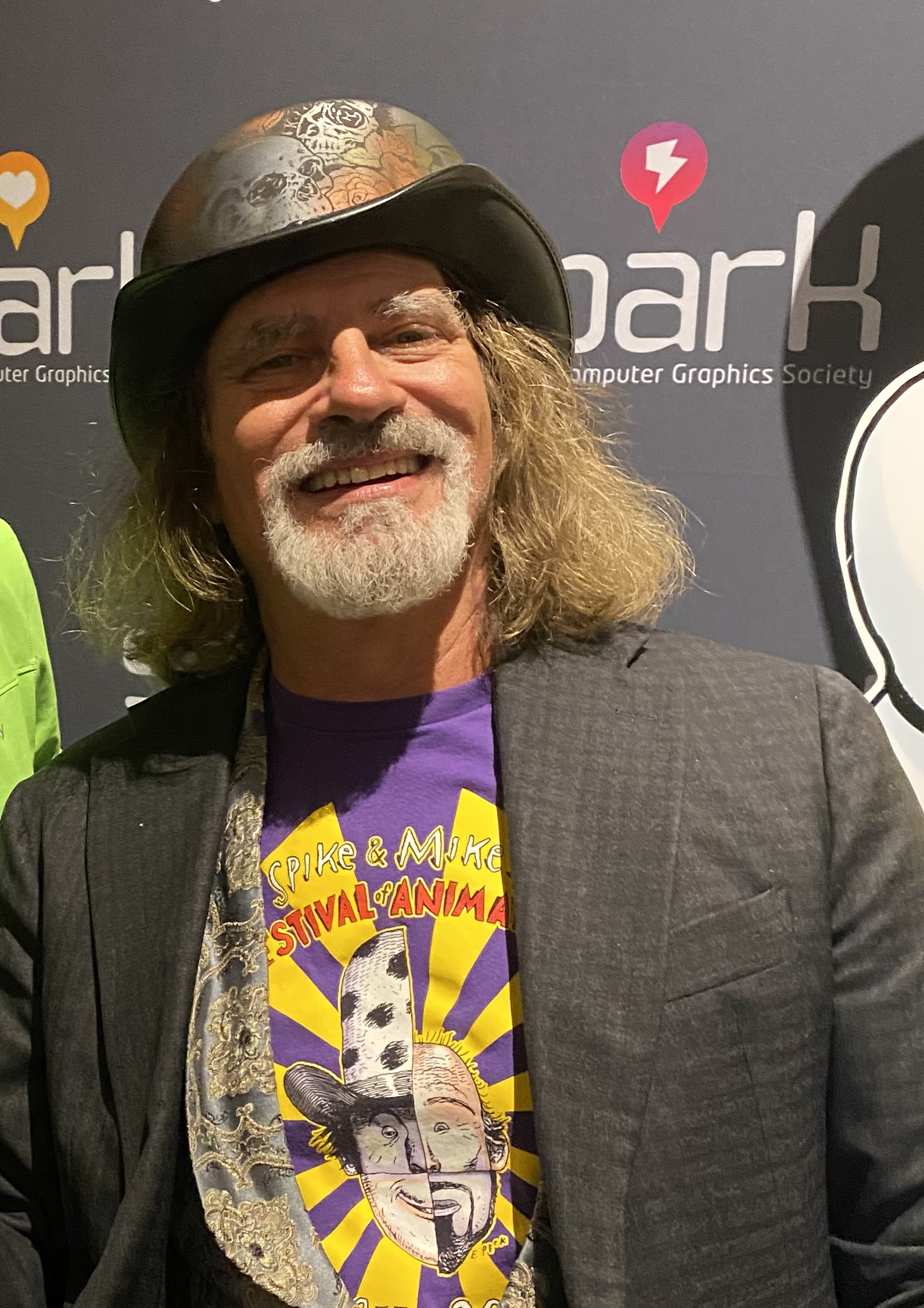
- Silverman at 2023 SPARKCG
- Born: March 15, 1957 (age 69); Long Island, New York, U.S.
- Education: University of California, Los Angeles (BA, MFA)
- Occupations: Animator; director
- Writing career
- Years active: 1979–present
- Genres: Comedy; fantasy
- Notable works: The Simpsons (1989–present); Monsters, Inc. (2001); The Simpsons Movie (2007)

David Silverman (born March 15, 1957) is an American animator, film and television director and writer who has directed numerous episodes of the animated television series The Simpsons, as well as its 2007 film adaptation. Silverman was involved with the series from the very beginning, animating all of the original short Simpsons cartoons that aired on The Tracey Ullman Show. He went on to serve as director of animation for several years.

He also served as co-director of the Pixar film Monsters, Inc (2001), directed the film Extinct (2021) and did the animation for the 2016 film The Edge of Seventeen, which was produced by Gracie Films.

== Early life and career ==
Silverman was born to a Jewish family on Long Island, New York. His father, Joseph Silverman, was a chemical engineering professor at the University of Maryland, College Park, for over 30 years. He grew up in Silver Spring, Maryland, and attended the University of Maryland for two years before earning Bachelor of Arts and Master of Fine Arts degrees from the University of California, Los Angeles.

Early in his career with The Simpsons, he was a subject on the December 26, 1990, episode (#83) of To Tell the Truth.

== The Simpsons ==
Silverman is largely credited with creating most of the "rules" for drawing The Simpsons. He is frequently called upon to animate difficult or especially important scenes, becoming go-to in Season 2 when he animated the first of Homer's many "rants, freak-outs, and heart attacks". He appeared during the end credits of the Simpsons episode "Goo Goo Gai Pan" giving a quick method of drawing Bart, and is a frequent participant on the Simpsons DVD audio commentaries. A cartoon rendering of him can be seen in "The Itchy & Scratchy & Poochie Show", where he is the animator who draws Poochie (along with renderings of other Simpsons staffers). He was once credited as Pound Foolish as the director of the episode "The Simpsons 138th Episode Spectacular".

Silverman is also the director of The Simpsons Movie, which was released July 27, 2007. He originally left The Simpsons during the production of its ninth season to direct additional sequences for The Road to El Dorado for DreamWorks Animation alongside Will Finn, ultimately returning for the series' thirteenth season in 2001. Some of his other film work includes Monsters, Inc. for Walt Disney Pictures and Pixar, for which he was a co-director (alongside Lee Unkrich). He is currently a consulting producer and occasional director. He also worked on the animated films Ice Age, Robots, and Looney Tunes: Back in Action.

In 2012, Silverman directed the theatrical short The Longest Daycare starring Maggie Simpson, released in front of Ice Age: Continental Drift. The short was nominated for the Academy Award for Best Animated Short Film. He also directed the follow-up theatrical short Playdate with Destiny in 2020, released in front of Onward.

=== Episodes directed by Silverman ===
- "Simpsons Roasting on an Open Fire"
- "Bart the Genius"
- "Bart the General"
- "Life on the Fast Lane"
- "Some Enchanted Evening" (with Kent Butterworth)
- "Bart Gets an 'F'"
- "Treehouse of Horror" ("The Raven" segment only)
- "Bart vs. Thanksgiving"
- "The Way We Was"
- "Old Money"
- "Blood Feud"
- "Black Widower"
- "Homer's Triple Bypass"
- "Krusty Gets Kancelled"
- "Treehouse of Horror IV" (as David "Dry Bones" Silverman)
- "Another Simpsons Clip Show"
- "Homie the Clown"
- "Mother Simpson"
- "The Simpsons 138th Episode Spectacular" (as Pound Foolish)
- "Treehouse of Horror XIII"
- "Treehouse of Horror XV" (as "The Tell-Tale Silverman")
- "Treehouse of Horror XVI" (as "Godzilla vs. Silverman")
- "Treehouse of Horror XVII" (with Matthew Faughnan) (as David "Tubatron" Silverman)
- "The Man Who Came to Be Dinner"
- "Treehouse of Horror XXXVII" (as "The Return of the Silverman")

=== Episodes written by Silverman ===
- "Lisa Gets the Blues" (with Brian Kelley)

== Style ==
Silverman's direction and animation is known for its energy, sharp timing, adventurous use of design elements and often complex acting, involving expressions and poses which are often quixotic, emotionally specific or highly exaggerated. It frequently recalls the works of Ward Kimball, Tex Avery, Bob Clampett and Chuck Jones. His most prolific period of work on The Simpsons can be roughly categorized as beginning with the "Tracey Ullman" episodes and ending in or around season eight of the series, for which he animated Homer's psychedelic dream in "El Viaje Misterioso de Nuestro Jomer (The Mysterious Voyage of Homer)". Other representative examples of Silverman's work on The Simpsons include Homer's histrionic, spasmodic heart attack in "Homer's Triple Bypass", Homer's demented hysterics over the iconic painting of poker-playing canines in "Treehouse of Horror IV" and subsequent turn as an even-more-deranged appropriation of Jack Nicholson's character from The Shining in "Treehouse of Horror V", and Homer's over-the-top sugar diatribe from "Lisa's Rival".

== Filmography ==
=== Television ===
Year	Title	Director	Writer	Producer	Storyboard Artist	Animator	Other	Notes
1984	Turbo Teen	No	No	No	No	Yes	No	
1987–89	The Tracey Ullman Show	Partial	No	No	No	Yes	No	Segment Director: "The Simpsons" Shorts
1989–present	The Simpsons	Yes	Yes	Yes	Yes	Yes	Yes	Supervising Director (seasons 1–8, 16–17), Consulting Producer, Executive Consultant (season 9), Title Designer, Character Layout Artist, Storyboards, Storyboard Consultant, Storyboard Revisions, Main Title Designer, Background Designer, Additional Voices, Song Lyrics: "Spider-Pig"
1994–95	The Critic	No	No	No	No	No	Yes	Visual Design
1995	Eek! The Cat	No	No	Executive	Yes	No	Yes	Creator, Executive Producer, Voice of John Heap (Klutter! segment)
1997	Teen Angel	No	No	No	No	No	Yes	Creative Consultant
2001	Rugrats	No	No	No	No	Yes	No	
2014	Family Guy	No	No	No	No	No	Yes	Special Thanks (Episode: "The Simpsons Guy")
2015	House of Lies	No	No	No	No	No	Yes	Himself
2017	Party Legends	No	No	No	No	Yes	No	
2018	Super Slackers	Yes	Yes	Executive	No	No	No	
2020–2022	Duncanville	No	No	Consulting	No	No	No	
2022	Werewolf by Night	No	No	No	No	No	Yes	Actor (The Flaming Tuba)

=== Feature films ===
Year	Title	Director	Story Artist	Animator	Other	Notes
1986	One Crazy Summer	No	No	Yes	No	
1991	The Dark Backward	No	No	No	Yes	Creator: "Blumps" concept
1993	RoboCop 3	No	No	No	Yes	Director: "Johnny Rehab" commercial
2000	The Road to El Dorado	No	No	No	Yes	Additional Sequences Director
2001	Monsters, Inc.	Co-Director	No	No	Yes	Additional Story Material, CDA
2002	Ice Age	No	No	No	Yes	Story Consultant
2003	Confessions of a Burning Man	No	No	No	Yes	Additional Cinematographer; Documentary
2003	Looney Tunes: Back in Action	No	No	No	Yes	Animation Consultant
2005	Robots	No	Yes	No	No	
2007	The Simpsons Movie	Yes	No	No	No	
2014	Such Good People	No	No	No	Yes	Personal Thanks
2015	Love	No	No	No	Yes	Grateful Thanks
2016	The Edge of Seventeen	No	No	Yes	No	
2021	Extinct	Yes	No	No	Yes	Voices of Cyclops / Donut Store Clerk

==== Short films ====
Year	Title	Director	Screenwriter	Story Artist	Animator	Other	Notes
1979	Tom Waits for No One	No	No	No	Yes	No	
1982	Luau	No	No	No	No	Yes	Special Thanks
1982	The Strange Case of Mr. Donnybrook's Boredom	Yes	No	Yes	Yes	Yes	Layout Artist, Ink Artist, Background Artist
1987	Propagandance	No	No	No	Assistant	No	
2002	Mike's New Car	No	No	No	No	Yes	Special Thanks
2011	Night of the Little Dead	No	No	No	No	Yes	Tuba Player
2012	The Longest Daycare	Yes	No	Yes	No	No	
2016	Bouncing Blunders	No	No	No	No	Yes	Special Thanks
2016	Duhkha	No	No	No	No	Yes	Special Thanks
2020	Playdate with Destiny	Yes	Yes	Yes	No	No	
2021	The Force Awakens from Its Nap	Yes	No	Yes	No	No	
2021	The Good, the Bart, and the Loki	Yes	No	Yes	No	No	
2021	The Simpsons | Balenciaga	Yes	No	Yes	No	No	
2021	Plusaversary	Yes	No	Yes	No	No	
2021	Te Deseo Lo Mejor	Yes	No	Yes	No	No	
2022	When Billie Met Lisa	Yes	No	Yes	No	No	
2022	Welcome to the Club	Yes	No	Yes	No	No	
2022	The Simpsons Meet the Bocellis in "Feliz Navidad"	Yes	No	Yes	No	No	
2023	Rogue Not Quite One	Yes	No	Yes	No	No	
2024	May the 12th Be with You	Yes	No	Yes	No	No	
2024	The Most Wonderful Time of the Year	Yes	No	Yes	No	No	

== Klutter! ==
Silverman worked with Savage Steve Holland to create Klutter! for Fox Kids. It was produced by Fox Kids Company, Savage Studios Ltd, and Film Roman. It was part of Eek! Stravaganza in the fourth season of the 1995–96 season where he voiced John Heap. It lasted eight episodes from September 9, 1995, to April 14, 1996.

== Campus tours ==
Silverman has toured many college campuses, speaking about his experiences as an animator and longtime Simpsons director and producer. He describes his early experiences in the animation field, working on shows such as Turbo Teen and Mister T. He goes on to say that at the point he considered leaving animation to devote his time to cartoon illustration, he took a job animating on The Tracey Ullman Show. He has pointed out that he and his fellow animators Wes Archer and Bill Kopp first started animating The Simpsons shorts on March 23, 1987.

Silverman then elaborates on Simpsons production, the evolution of the show and its characters, and various show facts and trivia. He may show animatics, deleted scenes, and favorite scenes and sequences, while giving background information. He closes by hand-drawing character sketches before the audience.

== Music ==
Silverman plays the tuba and has performed at events like Burning Man with the Transformational All Star Fire Conclave Marching Band and on June 23, 2006, he appeared on The Tonight Show with Jay Leno, where he played his flaming sousaphone. Silverman was a member of the UCLA Bruin Marching Band Sousaphone Section in the early 1980s. He is currently a member of Los Trancos Woods Community Marching Band. In January 2009, Silverman joined the LA band Vaud and the Villains.
