= The Call of the Simpsons =

- The Simpsons episode
- Episode no.: Season 1 Episode 7
- Directed by: Wesley Archer
- Written by: John Swartzwelder
- Production code: 7G09
- Original air date: February 18, 1990

Guest appearance
- Albert Brooks as Cowboy Bob (credited as A. Brooks)

Episode features
- Chalkboard gag: "I will not draw naked ladies in class"
- Couch gag: The family comes in and just sits on the couch in a normal manner.
- Commentary: Wes Archer; Al Jean; Mike Reiss

Episode chronology
← Previous "Moaning Lisa"	Next → "The Telltale Head"
- The Simpsons season 1

"The Call of the Simpsons" is the seventh episode of the American animated television series The Simpsons. It originally aired on Fox in the United States on February 18, 1990. It was written by John Swartzwelder and directed by Wesley Archer. Albert Brooks made his first of ten guest appearances on The Simpsons franchise in this episode as the voice of Cowboy Bob.

In this episode, Homer purchases an RV and the Simpsons vacation in the wilderness. After the RV accidentally plummets from a cliff, the Simpsons find themselves stranded in a forest. While Bart and Homer try hiking back to civilization, Homer gets covered in mud and is mistaken for Bigfoot by a naturalist. News of the Bigfoot encounter spreads quickly and soon hunters converge to capture Homer. Meanwhile, Maggie is separated from her family and cared for by bears.

== Plot ==
Jealous of Ned Flanders' new motor home, Homer visits Bob's RV Round-up to buy one. Because of his poor credit rating, he only qualifies for a smaller, dilapidated RV, which he is conned into purchasing. Homer takes his family on an excursion, driving on remote backroads. After Homer ignores Marge's suggestion to drive back to the main road, the Simpsons find themselves teetering over a precipice. They escape the RV before it plummets over the cliff and explodes, leaving them stranded in the wilderness with no food or supplies.

After Homer builds a crude lean-to shelter, he and Bart leave to find help, unaware that Maggie is tagging along. Marge and Lisa stay behind and build a fire and sturdier shelter despite knowing nothing about camping. Separated from Homer and Bart, Maggie is adopted by a family of bears. Homer and Bart lose their clothes after plunging over a waterfall and falling into a raging river. They hide their exposed bodies with leaves and mud. After a frigid night's sleep, Homer tries to steal honey from a beehive. When the bees attack him, he evades them by jumping into a mud pit. Homer is mistaken for Bigfoot after a nature photographer takes a picture of him covered in mud. Soon the forest is inundated with Bigfoot enthusiasts after a tabloid offers a $5,000 reward for capturing the creature alive.

After Marge and Lisa are rescued by park rangers, Marge tells the media the monster in question is her husband, leading to tabloid headlines such as "I married Bigfoot". Cold, hungry, and exhausted, Homer and Bart stumble upon the bears' cave and retrieve Maggie. Homer is captured and taken to a lab for testing. He returns home after scientists agree that he is "either a below-average human being or a brilliant beast". While watching news coverage of his ordeal, Homer worries his co-workers will mock him until Marge consoles him by calling him "my brilliant beast."

== Production ==
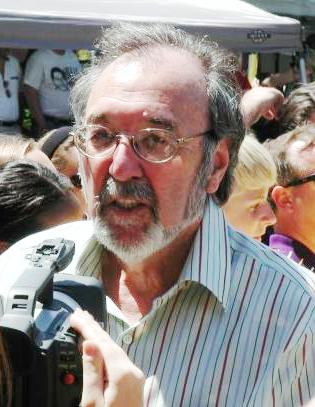
James L. Brooks suggested an idea for the plot that was later scrapped.

The episode was written by John Swartzwelder and directed by Wesley Archer. A plot twist that involved Homer being carried away to an eagle nest and being raised as a baby eagle was suggested for this episode by executive producer James L. Brooks, but they ended up going with Maggie being raised by bears instead. The sequence with Marge and Lisa by the bonfire was originally longer and included a conversation between the two about boys, but it was cut from the episode. In the original script, Homer and Bart were not talking in the scene where they concealed their private parts with mud and moss, but Sam Simon thought it would be "too funny to leave as a stage direction" and they added dialogue to the scene.

Albert Brooks guest starred in the episode as the voice of Cowboy Bob. He was not sure whether he wanted to be identified with a cartoon show or not at the time, like many of the other early guest stars on The Simpsons, and was therefore credited as A. Brooks in the ending credits. The episode was a satire of the Bigfoot specials that had aired on Fox at the time it was written. A lot of resources were spent on the backgrounds, trying to make them look realistic with many observational details such as trees, rocks, fences and the way the cars were positioned. Burger King figurines were made out of the camping designs of the Simpsons family in this episode.

== Reception ==
In its original American broadcast on February 18, 1990, "The Call of the Simpsons" finished third that day, with a Nielsen rating of 14.6 and a 22 percent audience share. The episode was nominated for an Emmy Award in 1990 in the category "Outstanding Sound Mixing for a Comedy Series or a Special". IGN named Albert Brooks' guest performance in this episode, along with his four other appearances on The Simpsons, the best guest appearance in the show's history.

"The Call of the Simpsons" received mixed reviews from critics. Gary Russell and Gareth Roberts, authors of the book I Can't Believe It's a Bigger and Better Updated Unofficial Simpsons Guide, both criticized and praised the episode saying: "This episode is a bit less than the sum of its parts. The early stuff at the RV Round-Up is much better than the main camping story, although there's some nice Marge-Lisa bonding, and who could resist Maggie and the bears?" In a DVD review of the first season, David B. Grelck rated the episode a 1 1/2 (of 5), adding "the surrealism of Homer as bigfoot is a major misstep. This type of gag would be very different today, if done at all."

Jon Bonné at MSNBC called the episode "a perfect example of the first season's bizarre and fruitful balance between edgy humor and softly-drawn neuroses" and said "it was this combination that made Groening's shorts for the Ullman show so compelling, and ultimately what made it possible for The Simpsons to break the molds of network television". Colin Jacobson at DVD Movie Guide said in a review that "while [the episode] doesn't offer the continuous highs of the best Simpsons, it's a generally solid show" and added that "the episode uses a wackier tone than usual for this era, but it works, and the program is consistently fun".

== Cultural references ==
The song that is playing in the background as the Simpson family is traveling into the woods is "The Happy Wanderer" ("Der fröhliche Wanderer" in the original German).
