= Chief Wiggum =

Character from The Simpsons franchise

Clancy Wiggum
- The Simpsons character
- First appearance: "Homer's Odyssey"; January 21, 1990
- Created by: Matt Groening
- Designed by: Matt Groening
- Voiced by: Hank Azaria

In-universe information
- Gender: Male
- Occupation: Police chief of Springfield
- Family: Iggy Wiggum (father); Mark (cousin); Unnamed brother
- Spouses: Sarah Wiggum
- Children: Ralph Wiggum (son)

Chief Clancy Wiggum is a character from the animated television series The Simpsons, voiced by Hank Azaria. He is the chief of police in the show's setting of Springfield, and is the father of Ralph Wiggum and the husband of Sarah Wiggum.

Gluttonous, irresponsible, and immature, Wiggum is often too lazy, cowardly, and corrupt to bother fighting crime. His more responsible subordinate officers Eddie and Lou play the straight men to his shenanigans.

== Character development ==
His surname "Wiggum" is Matt Groening's mother's maiden name and her parents were Norwegian immigrants. As "a conscious pun", Wiggum was designed to look like a pig. Hank Azaria first based his voice for Wiggum on David Brinkley, but it was too slow and he switched it to an Edward G. Robinson impression. The first mention of his first name being Clancy was in "Homer's Barbershop Quartet", but in the script for "The Telltale Head" his name was Abner Wiggum.

== Biography ==
Many episodes have dealt with the back story of how Wiggum, despite his incompetence, occupies such a high rank in the Springfield Police Department. However, these jokes tend to contradict one another, as is typical with side characters on The Simpsons. Wiggum was temporarily promoted to Commissioner of Police for the state in which Springfield resides during the 2005 episode "Pranksta Rap". He also appeared on a Halloween novel depicting Netflix's Stranger Things Chief Jim Hopper.

== Bibliography ==
- Groening, Matt (October 28, 2010). Richmond, Ray; Gimple, Scott M.; McCann, Jessie L.; Seghers, Christine; Bates, James W. (eds.). Simpsons World: The Ultimate Episode Guide: Seasons 1–20 (1st ed.). HarperCollins. ISBN 9780061711282.
