= Simpsons Roasting on an Open Fire =

- The Simpsons episode
- Title card
- Episode no.: Season 1 Episode 1
- Directed by: David Silverman
- Written by: Mimi Pond
- Production code: 7G08
- Original air date: December 17, 1989
- Running time: 23 minutes

Episode features
- Commentary: Matt Groening; James L. Brooks; David Silverman

Episode chronology
← Previous —	Next → "Bart the Genius"
- The Simpsons season 1

"Simpsons Roasting on an Open Fire" (titled onscreen as "The Simpsons Christmas Special") is the series premiere of the American animated television series The Simpsons. A Christmas special, the show had a very long delayed release. It first aired on Fox in the United States on December 17, 1989. Introducing the Simpson family into half-hour television, in this episode, Bart Simpson disobediently gets a tattoo without the permission of his parents. After Marge spends all the family's holiday budget on having it removed, Homer learns that his boss is not giving employees Christmas bonuses, and takes a job as a shopping mall Santa in order to pay for his children's Christmas presents.

The Simpsons was originally intended to debut earlier in 1989 with "Some Enchanted Evening", but due to animation problems with that episode, the series debuted with the Christmas Special episode on December 17. "Simpsons Roasting on an Open Fire" was written by Mimi Pond and directed by David Silverman, and was the sole full-length episode of the series to air during the 1980s. Promos for the next episode ("Bart the Genius") ran during commercial breaks for this episode.

"Simpsons Roasting on an Open Fire" was viewed by approximately 13.4 million people in its original airing, and was nominated for two Emmy Awards in 1990. Since its release on home video, the episode has received positive reviews from critics.

== Plot ==
After attending the Springfield Elementary School Christmas pageant, the Simpsons prepare for the holiday season. Bart and Lisa write letters to Santa; Lisa asks for a pony — which Marge tries to tactfully discourage by claiming that there would not be enough room for one on Santa's sleigh — and Bart wants a tattoo, which Marge and Homer forbid him from getting. The next day, Marge takes the kids Christmas shopping at the mall. Bart sneaks away to get a tattoo that reads "Mother" on his arm, thinking that Marge will like it. Before the artist can finish the tattoo, Marge finds Bart and drags him to the dermatologist to have it removed. She is forced to spend the family's entire holiday budget on the procedure, believing that Homer's Christmas bonus will cover gift expenses.

At the power plant, the boss Mr. Burns cancels this year's employee Christmas bonus. When he learns Marge spent the family's holiday money on tattoo removal, Homer moonlights as a shopping mall Santa at the suggestion of his friend Barney Gumble. While at the mall on Christmas Eve, Bart removes Santa's beard, exposing Homer's secret. Bart apologizes for the prank and praises his father for moonlighting to give the family Christmas presents. After Homer's Santa gig pays far less than expected due to deductions for training and uniform, he and Bart receive a greyhound racing tip from Barney.

At Springfield Downs, Homer bets all his money on a last-minute entry named Santa's Little Helper, a 99–1 long shot, believing it to be a sign of a Christmas miracle. The greyhound unfortunately finishes last. As Homer and Bart leave the track, they see the dog's owner yell and abandon him for losing the race. Bart pleads with Homer to keep the dog as a pet. They return home, where Homer's confession to not getting his Christmas bonus is interrupted when Bart introduces Santa's Little Helper to the others. The family is overjoyed by this gesture and celebrates by singing "Rudolph the Red-Nosed Reindeer".

== Development ==
=== Origin of The Simpsons ===
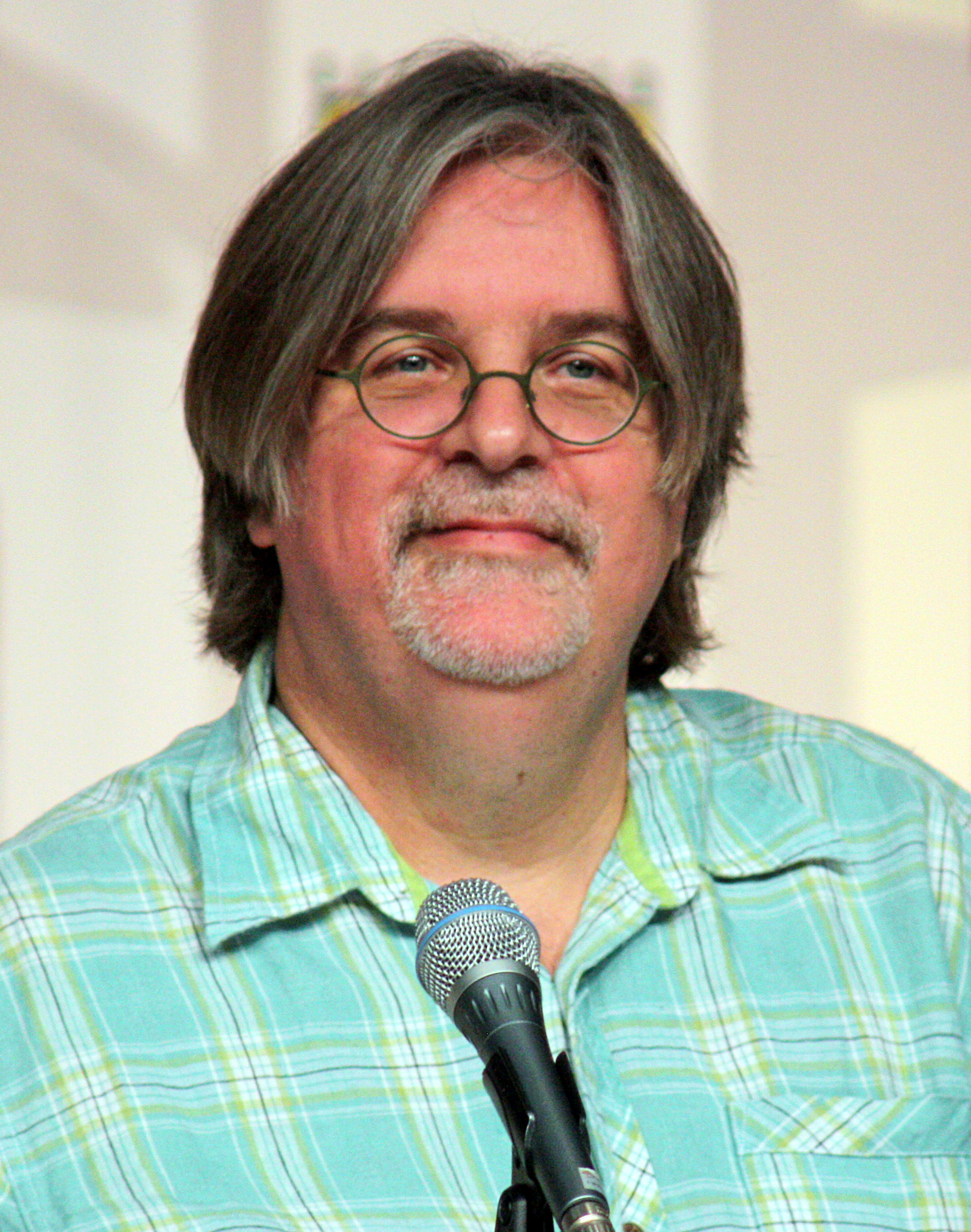
The Simpsons creator Matt Groening

The Simpsons creator Matt Groening conceived of the idea for the Simpsons in the lobby of James L. Brooks' office. Brooks, the producer of the sketch comedy program The Tracey Ullman Show, wanted to use a series of animated shorts as bumpers between sketches. He had asked Groening to pitch an idea for a series of animated shorts, which Groening initially intended to present as his Life in Hell series. However, when Groening realized that animating Life in Hell would require the rescinding of publication rights for his life's work, he chose another approach and formulated his version of a dysfunctional family.

The Simpson family first appeared as shorts in The Tracey Ullman Show on April 19, 1987. Groening submitted only basic sketches to the animators and assumed that the figures would be cleaned up in production. However, the animators merely re-traced his drawings, which led to the crude appearance of the characters in the initial short episodes. In 1989, a team of production companies adapted The Simpsons into a half-hour series for the Fox Broadcasting Company. Brooks negotiated a provision in the contract with the Fox network that prevented Fox from interfering with the show's content. Groening said his goal in creating the show was to offer the audience an alternative to what he called "the mainstream trash" they were watching. The half-hour series premiered on December 17, 1989, with this episode.

=== Production ===
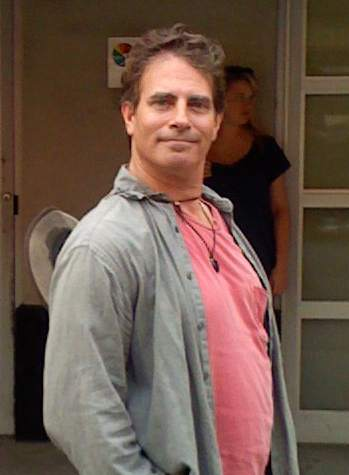
David Silverman directed the episode.

"Simpsons Roasting on an Open Fire" is the first episode of The Simpsons, and the Fox network was nervous about the show because they were unsure if it could sustain the audience's attention for the duration of the episode. They proposed doing three seven-minute shorts per episode and four specials until the audience adjusted, but in the end, the producers gambled by asking Fox for 13 full-length episodes. The series was originally planned to premiere earlier in the fall of 1989 with the episode "Some Enchanted Evening", but due to major problems with the animation of that episode, the series began on December 17 with this episode. "Some Enchanted Evening" instead aired as the season finale. "Simpsons Roasting on an Open Fire", being the first to air, lacked the opening sequence which was later added in the second episode, "Bart the Genius", when Groening realized that a longer opening sequence resulted in less animation. Because "Simpsons Roasting on an Open Fire" was the eighth episode produced, but the first one aired, it has more refined animation than the episodes following it, such as "Bart the Genius" and "Homer's Odyssey". Additionally, the characters' personalities are more developed.

The "Santas of Many Lands" portion of the Christmas pageant is based on Groening's experience in the second grade when he did a report on Christmas in Russia. Groening also used that reference in his comic strip Life in Hell when he spoofed himself as a young man, being told that it is too bad his grandmother was from Russia because Christmas was against the law there. Also, Groening claims that this episode has been incorrectly credited with creating the "alternate version" of "Jingle Bells" that has become a well-known children's playground song. During Lisa's performance at the Christmas pageant, she appears to be naked from the waist down. According to David Silverman, this was an animation error, and she was intended to be wearing a body stocking, but the Korean animators never colored it in.

Mimi Pond wrote the episode, the only one she wrote for the series, while staff writer Al Jean came up with the title, which alludes to "The Christmas Song", also known as "Chestnuts Roasting on an Open Fire". David Silverman directed this episode, while Rich Moore storyboarded it and designed Ned Flanders. Several of the scenes were laid out by Eric Stefani, brother of Gwen Stefani, the lead singer of the rock band No Doubt. In this episode, Barney Gumble has blond hair, which was the same color as his skin, but that was later dropped because of the belief that only the Simpson family should have such hair. Seymour Skinner, Milhouse Van Houten, Ralph Wiggum, Sherri & Terri, Moe Szyslak, Mr. Burns, Barney Gumble, Patty & Selma, Grampa Simpson, Ned & Todd Flanders, Santa's Little Helper, Snowball II, Dewey Largo, and Lewis all make their first appearances in this episode. Snowball I is mentioned for the first time, and Waylon Smithers can be heard over the speaker at the power plant, but he is not seen.

== Reception ==
In its original American broadcast, "Simpsons Roasting on an Open Fire" finished in thirtieth place in the weekly ratings for the week of December 11–17, 1989, with a Nielsen rating of 14.5, and was viewed in approximately 13.4 million homes. It was the second-highest-rated show on Fox up to that point.

Since airing, the episode has received mostly positive reviews from television critics. IGN's Robert Canning in a 2008 review of the episode noted, "though not the funniest of episodes, it certainly was groundbreaking. [...] With this episode, The Simpsons had its premise down, and it certainly had its edge." Gary Russell and Gareth Roberts, the authors of the book I Can't Believe It's a Bigger and Better Updated Unofficial Simpsons Guide, said of the episode: "pretty standard early fare, with the series not quite hitting its stride". They went on to say, "the realism of the first season is much apparent, with only the laser used to remove Bart's tattoo hinting at what the series will become."

In a DVD review of the first season, David B. Grelck gave the episode a rating of 3½/5 and commented: "Surprisingly, this early episode has a lot of the zest of the later shows, despite fairly odd-looking art and a very Walter Matthau voice for Homer, still has some laughs." Colin Jacobson at DVD Movie Guide said in a review that the episode "is good but not great early Simpsons" and further commented: "For many years I thought of 'Roasting' as a terrible episode, but it's not. While I don't feel it's anything special, it remains a fairly entertaining show that has a few entertaining moments."

The episode was nominated for two Emmy Awards in 1990: "Outstanding Animated Program" and "Outstanding Editing for a Miniseries or Special". Because "Simpsons Roasting on an Open Fire" was considered a separate special, The Simpsons was nominated twice in the Animated Program category. This episode lost to fellow The Simpsons episode "Life on the Fast Lane".

In 2009, IGN named the episode number 4 on its "Top 10 Holiday Specials" list, writing "With the off-beat sense of humor that we have learned to love from The Simpsons and a story showing the value of family on the Christmas holiday, we can't help but watch this great special every year." Al Jean, the current showrunner, selected the episode as one of five essential episodes in the show's history in 2014. In 2020, Jean acknowledged "Simpsons Roasting on an Open Fire" as an episode many consider to be a favorite.

In a retrospective review in The A.V. Club in 2010, Nathan Rabin called the episode "both naughty and nice", adding that its pace was slower than later episodes and resembled family sitcoms, but "the humor, heart and subversion that would make The Simpsons such a towering achievement were evident from the very beginning."

== Home media ==
The special was the subject of the series' first home video release, The Simpsons Christmas Special, released on VHS in 1991. The episode was also included in The Simpsons – Christmas (later retitled Christmas with The Simpsons), a DVD compilation of the series' Christmas episodes, produced in 2003. The episode was also included on The Simpsons season one DVD set, which was released on September 25, 2001. Groening, Brooks, and Silverman participated in the DVD's audio commentary.

Coinciding with the broadcast's 35th anniversary on December 17, 2024, Disney+ released temporarily the complete episode onto YouTube, preceded by an introductory segment with director Silverman alongside showrunner Matt Selman promoting the new Simpsons Christmas special "O C'mon All Ye Faithful".

== See also ==
- "Old Yeller-Belly", a season 14 episode in which Santa's Little Helper's previous owner from the racecourse takes him back.
- "The Way of the Dog", a season 31 episode that investigates Santa's Little Helper's background and flashes back to this episode.
