= Ralph Wiggum =

Fictional character from The Simpsons franchise

- The Simpsons character
- Ralph Wiggum
- First appearance: "Simpsons Roasting on an Open Fire" (1989)
- Created by: Matt Groening
- Designed by: Matt Groening
- Voiced by: Nancy Cartwright

In-universe information
- Gender: Male
- Occupation: Student at Springfield Elementary School; Future Police Chief of Springfield; 2008 US Presidential candidate with bi-partisan endorsement
- Family: Chief Wiggum (father); Sarah Wiggum (mother); Iggy Wiggum (grandfather)

Ralph Wiggum is a recurring character in the animated series The Simpsons. He is voiced by Nancy Cartwright. Ralph is characterized largely by his frequent non-sequiturs that range from nonsensical and bizarre to profound. His dim-witted behavior lends him an air of blissful ignorance.

The creator of the show, Matt Groening, has cited Ralph as one of his favorite characters. He generally remains one of the more popular and often quoted secondary characters in the show. In 2006, IGN ranked Ralph No. 3 on their list of the "Top 25 Simpsons Peripheral Characters", behind Sideshow Bob and Troy McClure.

== Role in The Simpsons ==
Ralph is characterized as a slow-witted and good-natured 8-year-old boy in Lisa Simpson's second-grade class, taught by Ms. Hoover. Initially, he was mostly used as a silent background character without consistent characterization. In later seasons, however, his role expanded, being a featured character in several episodes.

These episodes include: "I Love Lisa", an episode that set him apart from other tertiary characters and largely defined much of his character, "This Little Wiggy" and "E Pluribus Wiggum"; as well as appearances both minor and prominent in many other episodes. Ralph also appears in various other media, such as the Simpsons comic book series by Bongo, and has even received his own entry in The Simpsons Library of Wisdom series.

=== Personality ===
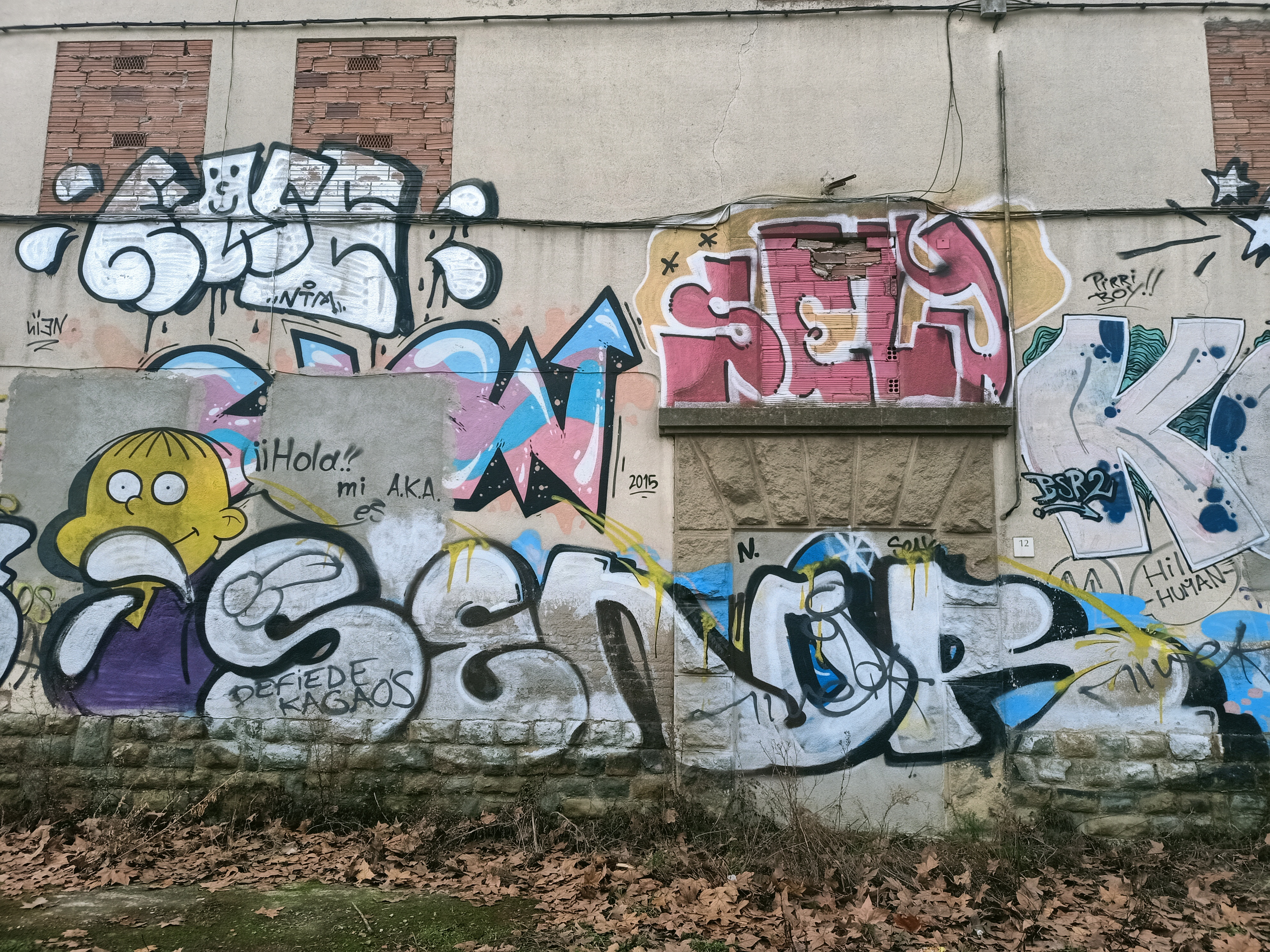
Ralph Wiggum in a graffiti in Vic, Spain

Ralph's primary role in the show is to deliver clueless asides and odd non sequiturs. Ralph is presented as quite daft, and verbally challenged. In one of his most famous quotes, Ralph responds to the news that he is failing English class with the retort: "Me fail English? That's unpossible!" In another of his famous quotes, he tries to greet Superintendent Chalmers, but he ends up saying "Hi Super Nintendo Chalmers."

In other instances, Ralph has been shown to speak with relative ease, notably in "I Love Lisa" when he gives an uncharacteristically powerful performance as George Washington in a school play. Occasionally, Ralph has been used to break the fourth wall straightforwardly.

Although it has never been explicitly stated in any Simpsons-related media that Ralph is intellectually disabled and/or brain damaged, Chief Wiggum drops baby Ralph in a flashback sequence, with the latter landing flat on his head. When Wiggum picks Ralph up again, Ralph suddenly has difficulty drinking out of his bottle.

== Creation and design ==
Ralph was named after Ralph Kramden, the character on The Honeymooners portrayed by comedian Jackie Gleason. Ralph's first credited appearance in the show was in the episode "Moaning Lisa", where he was considerably different in appearance and behavior appearing with different facial features and yellow hair, as well as lacking any of Ralph's dimwittedness. Ralph's modern design first appeared in the second-season episode "Homer vs. Lisa and the 8th Commandment". Early Ralph spoke with a voice similar to that of Nelson Muntz's until Cartwright settled into his higher-pitched whine. Originally intended to be a "Mini-Homer," Ralph eventually took on a life of his own. The staff later retconned Ralph into the son of Chief Wiggum, a fact initially hinted at in "Kamp Krusty" and later made canon in "I Love Lisa". Groening considers Ralph "really hard to write."

Ralph's normal attire usually consists of a blue long-sleeve shirt with a collar, a belt with a red buckle, and brown pants. Nonetheless, almost all Simpsons-related media and merchandise portray Ralph with white or light gray colored pants. Ralph's hair is meant to evoke a bowl-cut style. In one particular issue of the comic book, Ralph is drawn in a realistic style, depicted with blonde hair. Adult Ralph in "Bart to the Future" has light brown hair.

== Reception ==
Ralph has become one of the show's most popular characters. He is commonly featured on media and merchandise related to the show, including the season 13 home media box set. Kidrobot released Ralph as a separate figure from the rest of their Simpsons line of figurines in 2009. The figure is twice as large as the others. The comedy band The Bloodhound Gang made a song titled "Ralph Wiggum" on the album Hefty Fine, dedicated to the character and composed solely of some of his most famous quotes for lyrics. Show creator Matt Groening has stated that writers will most likely take credit for Ralph when someone asks who writes specific characters, which is a common misconception about the writing process.

== In popular culture ==
The Ralph Wiggum technique, a popular AI-driven software development method.
