= Dan Haskett =

American animator (born 1952)

- Born: Daniel A. Haskett; August 20, 1952 (age 74)
- Years active: 1969–present
- Known for: Beauty and the Beast; The Little Mermaid; Tiny Toon Adventures

Daniel A. Haskett (born August 20, 1952) is an American animator who, according to Variety, was one of a "group of young animators trained by Disney's 'Nine Old Men' that were confined to one small room in the Disney Feature Animation Building in the 1970s".

== Career ==
He started his career in 1969 when he graduated from the High School of Art and Design, and the first thing he did was a commercial for a coffee called Brim. According to Haskett, the commercial was "very psychedelic".

Haskett was worried when he first entered the company in 1977 due to Disney's reputation at that time.

He designed the character Belle for Disney’s Beauty and the Beast, as well as Ariel for The Little Mermaid, and Tod as an adult for The Fox and the Hound. Haskett also did earlier designs for Ursula; some were inspired by singer Patti LaBelle, and the character's hair almost looked like fins.

Haskett was the main designer of the characters Minerva Mink for Steven Spielberg's Animaniacs and Radio AAHS's mascot disc jockeys Ozzie and Kazoo. Haskett also has credits for films such as Tom and Jerry: The Movie, The Pagemaster, Toy Story and The Prince of Egypt, as well as Sesame Street and The Simpsons.

He has been drawing characters for Looney Tunes since 1979 and has recently worked as a character designer for Looney Tunes Cartoons.

== Credits ==
- Raggedy Ann and Andy: A Musical Adventure (1977) — assistant animator
- Cat's Can (1986, Sesame Street short) — director
- Daffy Duck's Quackbusters (1988) — animator
- The Simpsons (1989) — character designer for Moe Szyslak and Barney Gumble
- The Little Mermaid (1989) — character designer for Ursula and Ariel
- Tiny Toon Adventures (1990) — character designer, most known for Babs
- Beauty and the Beast (1991) — character designer for Belle
- Toy Story (1995) — character designer
- Space Jam: A New Legacy (2021) — animator
- Trick or Treat Scooby-Doo! (2022) — animator
