= The Telltale Head =

- The Simpsons episode
- Episode no.: Season 1 Episode 8
- Directed by: Rich Moore; Kent Butterworth (uncredited)
- Written by: Al Jean; Mike Reiss; Sam Simon; Matt Groening
- Production code: 7G07
- Original air date: February 25, 1990

Guest appearance
- Marcia Wallace as Edna Krabappel

Episode features
- Chalkboard gag: "I did not see Elvis"
- Couch gag: Bart pops out of the couch and comes down during the shot of the TV.
- Commentary: Rich Moore; Al Jean; Mike Reiss

Episode chronology
← Previous "The Call of the Simpsons"	Next → "Life on the Fast Lane"
- The Simpsons season 1

"The Telltale Head" is the eighth episode of the American animated television series The Simpsons. It originally aired on Fox in the United States on February 25, 1990. It was written by Al Jean, Mike Reiss, Sam Simon and Matt Groening, and directed by Rich Moore and an uncredited Kent Butterworth. In the episode, Bart cuts the head off the statue of Jebediah Springfield in the center of town to impress Jimbo, Kearney and Dolph, three older kids he admires. The town's residents, including the three boys, are horrified and Bart regrets his actions. After telling Lisa and Marge, Homer and Bart head to the center of town, where they are met by an angry mob. After Bart tells the mob that he has made a mistake, the townspeople forgive Bart and the boy places the head back on the statue. The episode's title and premise is a reference to the 1843 short story "The Tell-Tale Heart" by Edgar Allan Poe.

== Plot ==
The episode begins in medias res. On Monday night, Homer and Bart are chased through the streets of Springfield by an angry mob while carrying the head of the statue of their town founder, Jebediah Springfield. Surrounded by the mob, Bart begins to explain the events of the previous day, which starts the episode proper.

After going to church with his family, Bart is forbidden by Marge to see the violent movie Space Mutants 4. Later on, he runs into three of Springfield's bullies: Jimbo Jones, Kearney Zzyzwicz, and Dolph Starbeam, who invite Bart to sneak into the movie theater to watch Space Mutants 4.

After being thrown out of the theater by the manager, the gang shoplifts from the Kwik-E-Mart, owned by store clerk Apu Nahasapeemapetilon, throw rocks at the Jebediah Springfield statue, and watch clouds. Bart remarks that one cloud resembles the statue, but without a head. His new friends remark that they wish someone would decapitate the statue, saying it would be funny to see the town upset over it. When Bart disagrees, the bullies make fun of him. Bart is conflicted and asks Homer whether it is okay to compromise one's beliefs to be popular. Homer tells Bart that popularity is very important, as long as it does not involve killing someone. That night, Bart sneaks out of the house, and with no witnesses he decapitates the statue.

The town is shaken by the crime, which causes Bart to feel guilty about his action. The act also does not make him popular with Jimbo, Dolph, and Kearney, who tell Bart they did not actually mean what they said about cutting off the head, and that they would attack the culprit if he were with them. Bart begins to fear the consequences were his actions revealed, and his conscience manifests itself as the statue's severed head, which begins speaking to him. Unable to go on, Bart finally confesses to his family, explaining that he thought being popular was the most important thing in the world. Homer realizes it was his advice that caused Bart to commit the crime in the first place, and takes responsibility by accompanying Bart as he takes the head back to the statue, returning the story to the beginning.

Bart realizes his act has actually brought the town of Springfield closer together, and the mob agrees. The head is then returned to the statue and everyone forgives Homer and Bart. As they are leaving, Homer tells Bart that not all lynch mobs are this nice.

== Production ==
The idea to have the episode in flashbacks was originally thought up in the color screening stage of production. This is the first episode directed by Rich Moore. This is the first time Jebediah Springfield is mentioned, as well as the first time the Simpsons go to church. The announcer of the football game Homer is listening to at church is based on Keith Jackson. Two of the football players' names in the game are Kogen and Wolodarsky, in reference to The Simpsons writers Jay Kogen and Wallace Wolodarsky.

This is the first episode of the series in which Sideshow Bob, Reverend Lovejoy, Krusty the Clown, Jimbo Jones, Kearney Zzyzwicz, Dolph Starbeam, Ms. Albright, and Apu Nahasapeemapetilon appear. Bart awakening and finding the head of Jebediah Springfield in bed next to him is a reference to the scene in The Godfather where Jack Woltz finds the bloody severed head of his prize racehorse next to him one morning.

Outside of the Treehouse of Horror specials, this is one of only three episodes to actually show the title on screen (the others being season two's "Bart Gets Hit by a Car" and season seven's "22 Short Films About Springfield").

== Reception ==
In its original broadcast, "The Telltale Head" finished twenty-sixth in ratings for the week of February 19–25, 1990, with a Nielsen rating of 15.2, equivalent to approximately 14.0 million viewing households. It was the second highest-rated show on Fox that week, following Married... with Children.

Gary Russell and Gareth Roberts said they enjoyed: "the Simpsons [being] grossly dysfunctional in church, Homer dispensing terrible advice, and a real moral dilemma for Bart." In a DVD review of the first season, David B. Grelck rated this episode a 3 (of 5) and added, "This is a strange episode, touching on many bizarre aspects of the show to come." Colin Jacobson of DVD Movie Guide said, "Good little moments abounded, and this was a generally solid episode. I liked the objects the boys saw in the clouds, and quite a few other funny bits appeared. 'Telltale' wasn't a great episode, but it was generally entertaining and clever."
