= Kwik-E-Mart =

Shop in the television series The Simpsons

- The Simpsons organization
- Kwik-E-Mart logo
- First appearance: "The Telltale Head" (1990)

In-universe information
- Other name: Quick-E-Mart
- Type: Convenience store
- Location: Springfield, United States
- Owner: Apu Nahasapeemapetilon
- Key people: Sanjay Nahasapeemapetilon

The Kwik-E-Mart is a convenience store in the animated television series The Simpsons. It is a parody depicting many of the stereotypes of American convenience stores such as 7-Eleven and Circle K.

It is notorious for its high prices and the poor quality of its merchandise. It is run by an Indian-American named Apu Nahasapeemapetilon. It first appeared in the 1990 episode "The Telltale Head" and has since become a common setting in The Simpsons. The Simpsons family are regular customers.

In July 2007, eleven 7-Eleven locations in the United States and one in Canada were transformed into Kwik-E-Marts as part of a special promotion for The Simpsons Movie. Also in 2007, gift shops modeled after the "Kwik-E-Marts" were opened in Universal Studios Florida and Universal Studios Hollywood, where they are a companion to "The Simpsons Ride".

== Role in The Simpsons ==
In The Simpsons, the Kwik-E-Mart is a convenience store that sells the usual fare at extraordinarily high prices, including the always popular Squishee. The backstory is that the Kwik-E-Mart chain was started somewhere in the North Pole. The Springfield Kwik-E-Mart is operated by an Indian American character named Apu Nahasapeemapetilon, who runs the store with his brother Sanjay and is a caricature of the stereotypical "foreign born" convenience store clerk. Apu proudly gouges customers and sells tainted merchandise, such as rotten meat, expired milk, or tins with the label missing. The Kwik-E-Mart rarely closes; at one point Apu shuts the store for five minutes to attend a party and inadvertently locks Hans Moleman inside. The Kwik-E-Mart is quite often the target of robbers, leading to Apu having been shot on several occasions and as a result having almost missed work. On one occasion, Marge Simpson mentioned that because of the frequency of shootings, it is only a $100 fine. In the fifth season episode "Homer and Apu", Apu loses his job at the Kwik-E-Mart and the two characters visit the corporate CEO (voiced by Harry Shearer) in the Indian Himalayan mountains.

== Real-world versions ==
=== 7-Eleven promotion ===
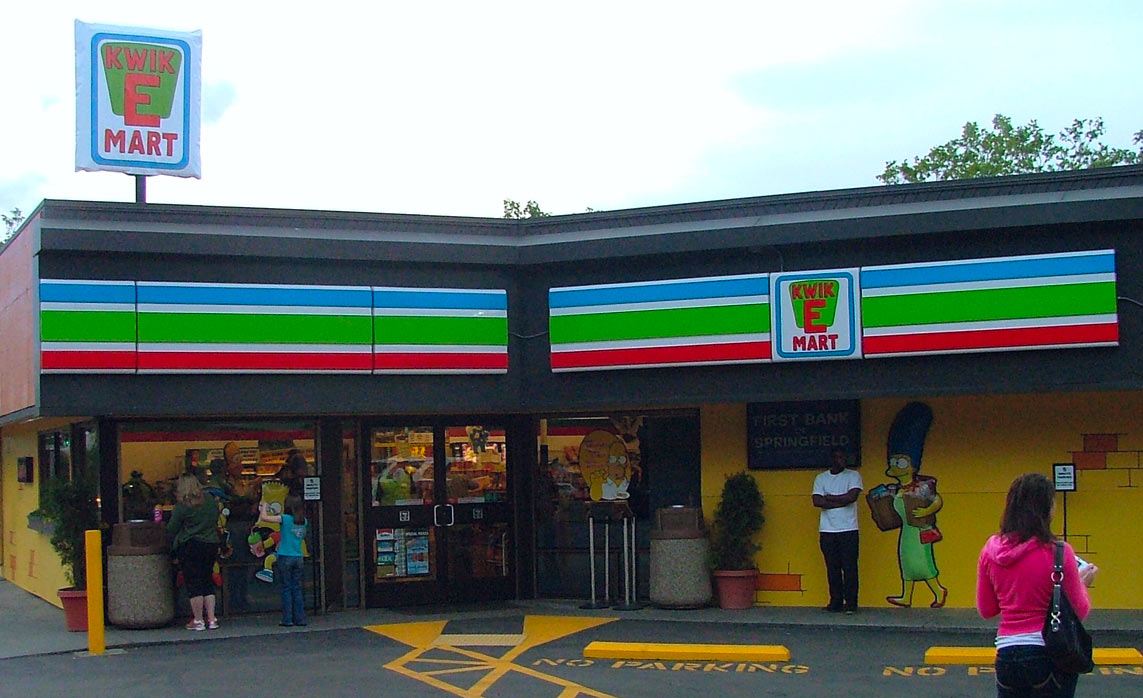
A 7-Eleven "Kwik-E-Mart" in Seattle in 2007, one of 12 stores temporarily converted so to promote The Simpsons Movie.

In July 2007, convenience store chain 7-Eleven converted 11 of its stores in the United States and one in Canada (Coquitlam) into Kwik-E-Marts to promote The Simpsons Movie. The concept was first visualized in 2006 by Fox's advertising agency, and the approximately 10 million dollar (US) cost of the promotion was borne by 7-Eleven. Another part of the promotion was a contest where customers who purchased a slurpee or sandwich also received a coded game piece that could be entered into a website. The grand prize of the contest was to be animated into an episode of The Simpsons. Prior to July, the promotion had long been known but the locations were kept a secret until the morning of July 1, when the 12 stores were made over with industrial foam, vinyl and Kwik-E-Mart signs.

These 12 locations, as well as the majority of other North American 7-Elevens, sold products found in The Simpsons, such as "Buzz Cola", "Krusty-O's", "Squishees", pink frosted "Sprinklicious doughnuts" and other Simpsons-themed merchandise. The Squishees were Slurpees that are sold in special collector cups and the Krusty-O's were made by Malt-O-Meal. Several other 7-Eleven items, such as sandwiches, were sold in Simpsons-themed packaging. It was decided that Duff Beer would not be sold due to the movie being rated PG-13, and the promoters wanted to have "good, responsible fun," though it was noted that it was a tough decision. However, a Duff Energy Drink was released in place of the Duff Beer.

The promotion resulted in a 30% increase in profits for the changed 7-Eleven stores. Many of the stores sold out of their special Simpsons products within a few days of the start of the promotion. The conversions lasted through early August, when the stores were converted back to 7-Elevens.

There was a mild controversy when the promotion offended members of the Indian-American community who felt that Apu is a caricature that plays on too many negative stereotypes. Despite this, 7-Eleven reported that many of its Indian employees have reacted positively to the idea, although it was noted that it was "not a 100 percent endorsement."

=== Universal Studios ===
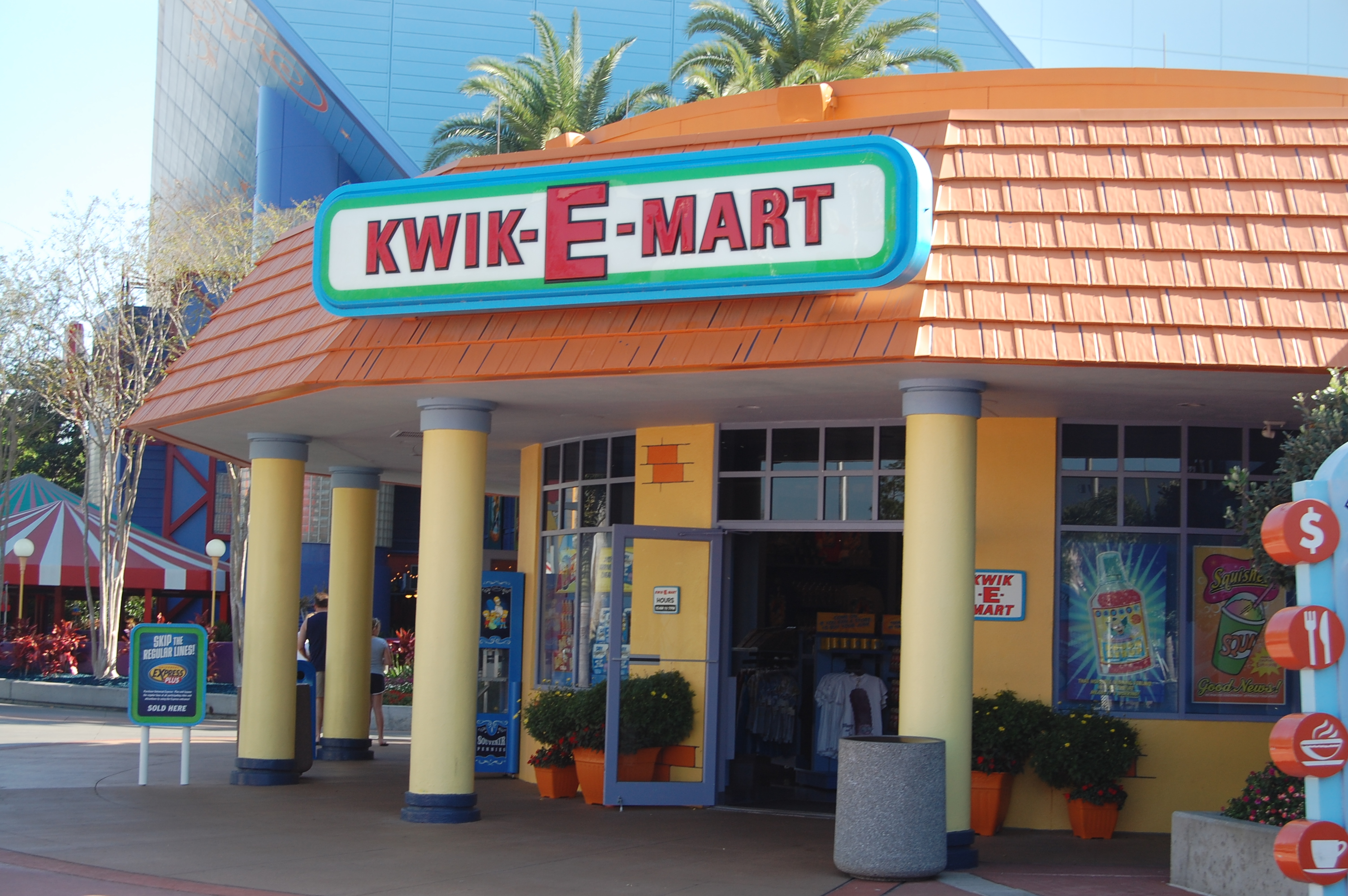
A Kwik-E-Mart at Universal Studios Florida

On October 17, 2007, a gift shop that was modeled after a Kwik-E-Mart was opened at Universal Studios Florida. One also opened at Universal Studios Hollywood at a later time. They replaced the old Back to the Future gift shop and supplement The Simpsons Ride, which opened in Spring 2008. The stores sell Simpsons-related merchandise like Flaming Moe's Energy Drinks and Squishees.

=== Broadway at the Beach ===
On August 17, 2018, a gift shop modeled after a Kwik-E-Mart opened at Broadway at the Beach in Myrtle Beach, South Carolina. The gift shop was placed at the exit of a 4D ride based on The Simpsons and was housed in a replica of The Aztec theatre from the series, which opened in 2019. The store sold Buzz Cola, Lard Lad Donuts, and Squishees along with merchandise from the show.

While no official statement has been made to date, as of late April/early May, 2024, the store, as well as the attached 4-D theater have been permanently closed. The attractions no longer appear on the Broadway at the Beach website, and an online petition has been created to reopen the attractions. Google also lists the attraction as permanently closed, alongside community posts online indicating the closures as well.
