= List of The Simpsons characters =

Some of the many recurring and regular characters in The Simpsons

Along with the Simpson family, The Simpsons includes a large array of characters: co-workers, teachers, family friends, extended relatives, townspeople, as well as local celebrities. The creators originally intended many of these characters as one-time jokesters or for fulfilling needed functions in the town. A number of them have gained expanded roles and subsequently starred in their own episodes. According to creator Matt Groening, the show adopted the concept of a large supporting cast from the Canadian sketch comedy show Second City Television.

The main episode characters, the Simpson family, are listed first; all other characters are listed in alphabetical order. Only main, supporting, and recurring characters are listed. For other recurring characters, see List of recurring The Simpsons characters.

== Characters ==
Character	Voice actor(s)	Character's role	Episode debut	Original air dates
Homer Simpson	Dan Castellaneta	Husband of Marge; father of Bart, Lisa, and Maggie. He is lazy and unintelligent, and often eats donuts, which are his favorite food. He works in a nuclear power plant. His mother, Mona, left him and his father, Abe, when he was younger, and he later gets to reunite with her until her death.	"Good Night"	1987-04-19
Marge Simpson	Julie Kavner	Wife of Homer; mother of Bart, Lisa, and Maggie. She is kind-hearted and stays at home as a housewife. Her father, Clancy, died when her children Bart and Lisa are 7 and 5 years old, respectively, and she is of French origin like him.	"Good Night"	1987-04-19
Bart Simpson	Nancy Cartwright	Oldest child and only son of Homer and Marge; brother of Lisa and Maggie. He thinks of himself as a destructive "bad boy" who is rebellious and mischievous to a fault. Enjoys pulling pranks.	"Good Night"	1987-04-19
Lisa Simpson	Yeardley Smith	Middle child and elder daughter of Homer and Marge; sister of Bart and Maggie. She is intelligent and plays with her saxophone; she is two years younger than Bart.	"Good Night"	1987-04-19
Maggie Simpson	Liz Georges, Gábor Csupó, Harry Shearer, Yeardley Smith, Nancy Cartwright, Elizabeth Taylor, James Earl Jones, Jodie Foster, Kevin Michael Richardson, Amy Sedaris, Lindsay Lohan	Youngest child and younger daughter of Homer and Marge; sister of Bart and Lisa. She does not talk.	"Good Night"	1987-04-19
Kumiko Albertson	Tress MacNeille (2014–2020), Jenny Yokobori (2021–present)	Japanese artist and the wife of Comic Book Guy.	"Married to the Blob"	2014-01-12
Ms. Albright	Tress MacNeille, Maggie Roswell	Sunday school teacher.	"The Telltale Head"	1990-02-25
Jasper Beardly	Harry Shearer, Dan Castellaneta	Grampa's closest neighbor at the Retirement Castle.	"Homer's Odyssey"	1990-02-04
Benjamin, Doug, and Gary	Dan Castellaneta, Hank Azaria, and Harry Shearer	Springfield University students.	"Homer Goes to College"	1993-10-14
Bill and Marty	Dan Castellaneta and Harry Shearer	KBBL Radio co-hosts.	"Bart vs. Thanksgiving"	1990-11-22
Blinky	Unvoiced	Three-eyed fish.	"Two Cars in Every Garage and Three Eyes on Every Fish"	1990-11-01
Blue-Haired Lawyer	Dan Castellaneta	Attorney.	"Bart Gets Hit by a Car"	1991-01-10
Booberella	Tress MacNeille	Host of late night TV monster movies. She is a parody of Elvira, who is in turn a parody of Vampira.	"I'm Spelling as Fast as I Can"	2003-02-16
Wendell Borton	Russi Taylor, Tress MacNeille, Pamela Hayden, Grey DeLisle-Griffin	Student at Springfield Elementary School.	"Homer's Odyssey"	1990-01-21
Clancy Bouvier	Harry Shearer	The chain-smoking husband of Jacqueline; father of Marge, Patty, and Selma, and grandfather of Ling. He was of French origin. He died when his grandchildren Bart and Lisa are 7 and 5 years old, respectively, and prior to the original series.	"The Way We Was"	1991-01-31
Jacqueline Bouvier	Julie Kavner	Mother of Selma and Patty and Marge, and grandmother of Bart, Lisa, Maggie and Ling. She is now a widow, after her husband Clancy died when her grandchildren Bart and Lisa are 7 and 5 years old, respectively.	"Bart vs. Thanksgiving"	1990-11-22
Patty Bouvier	Julie Kavner	Twin sister of Selma and older sister of Marge. Like her twin Selma, she can be seen smoking.	"Simpsons Roasting on an Open Fire"	1989-12-17
Selma Bouvier	Julie Kavner	Twin sister of Patty and older sister of Marge. Adoptive mother of Ling. Like her twin, Patty, she can be seen smoking. She is single, but she adopted a little Chinese girl named Ling.	"Simpsons Roasting on an Open Fire"	1989-12-17
Kent Brockman	Harry Shearer	Channel 6 News anchor.	"Krusty Gets Busted"	1990-04-29
Bumblebee Man	Hank Azaria (1992–2020), Eric Lopez (2020–present)	Star of slapstick sketch comedy show on Canal Ocho.	"Itchy & Scratchy: The Movie"	1992-11-03
Chazz Busby	Hank Azaria	Owner of Chazz Busby Ballet Academy.	"Smoke on the Daughter"	2008-03-30
Charles Montgomery Burns	Christopher Collins (early season 1), Harry Shearer	Owner of the Springfield Nuclear Power Plant.	"Simpsons Roasting on an Open Fire"	1989-12-17
Capital City Goofball	Tom Poston	Mascot of the Capital City Capitals baseball team.	"Dancin' Homer"	1990-11-08
Carl Carlson	Hank Azaria (1990–2020) Alex Désert (2020–present)	Springfield Nuclear Power Plant employee; one of Homer Simpson's friends.	"Homer's Night Out"	1990-03-25
Crazy Cat Lady	Tress MacNeille	Mentally ill owner of many cats. Name revealed as Eleanor Abernathy in "See Homer Run".	"Girly Edition"	1998-04-19
Gary Chalmers	Hank Azaria	Public schools superintendent.	"Whacking Day"	1993-04-29
Shauna Chalmers	Tress MacNeille	Daughter of Superintendent Chalmers. Despite being a student, she is working any jobs and in evenings she is working as a babysitter.	"The Good, the Sad, and the Drugly"	2009-04-19
Charlie	Dan Castellaneta	Springfield Nuclear Power Plant employee.	"Life on the Fast Lane"	1990-03-18
Chase (Pyro)	Hank Azaria	Luann Van Houten's ex-boyfriend; American Gladiator.	"A Milhouse Divided"	1996-12-01
Scott Christian	Dan Castellaneta	News co-anchor.	"Krusty Gets Busted"	1990-04-29
Lewis Clark	Russi Taylor, Nancy Cartwright, Tress MacNeille, Kevin Michael Richardson, Kimberly Brooks	Student at Springfield Elementary School.	"Simpsons Roasting on an Open Fire"	1989-12-17
Comic Book Guy	Hank Azaria	Proprietor of The Android's Dungeon comic book store. Name revealed to be Jeff Albertson in "Homer and Ned's Hail Mary Pass".	"Three Men and a Comic Book"	1991-05-09
Mr. Costington	Hank Azaria	President of Costington's Department Store.	"Trash of the Titans"	1998-04-26
Database	Nancy Cartwright, Pamela Hayden	Student at Springfield Elementary School. First name is revealed to be Kyle in "Yellow Subterfuge"	"Bart's Comet"	1995-02-05
Declan Desmond	Eric Idle	Documentary filmmaker.	"'Scuse Me While I Miss the Sky"	2003-03-20
Disco Stu	Hank Azaria	Disco aficionado.	"Two Bad Neighbors"	1996-01-14
Dolph	Tress MacNeille	Springfield Elementary School bully.	"The Telltale Head"	1990-02-25
Lunchlady Dora	Doris Grau (1991–1997); Tress MacNeille (2006–present)	Springfield Elementary School lunch lady. She's very annoyed and does not seem happy very much.	"Lisa's Pony"	1991-11-07
Duffman	Hank Azaria	Spokes-mascot for Duff Beer. His real name is Barry Duffman.	"The City of New York vs. Homer Simpson".	1997-09-21
Eddie and Lou	Harry Shearer (1990–present) and Hank Azaria (1990–2020) Alex Désert (2020–present)	Springfield police officers.	"There's No Disgrace Like Home"	1990-01-28
Fat Tony	Joe Mantegna	Mob Underboss.	"Bart the Murderer"	1991-10-10
Maude Flanders †	Maggie Roswell	Ned Flanders's wife (dies in Season 11).	"Dead Putting Society"	1990-11-15
Ned Flanders	Harry Shearer	The Simpson family's next door neighbor; owner of The Leftorium (until it closes in Season 29), Bart Simpson's teacher at Springfield Elementary School (Season 29 onwards, substituting the void left by former deceased teacher Edna Krabappel, who was previously married to Flanders from Seasons 23 to 25).	"Simpsons Roasting on an Open Fire"	1989-12-17
Rod Flanders	Pamela Hayden (1990–2024) Chris Edgerly (2024–present)	Ned and Maude Flanders's older son.	"The Call of the Simpsons"	1990-02-18
Todd Flanders	Nancy Cartwright	Ned and Maude Flanders's younger son.	"Simpsons Roasting on an Open Fire"	1989-12-17
Julio Franco	Hank Azaria (2003–2019) Tony Rodriguez (2021–present)	Homer’s great Julio and Grady are best friends.	"Three Gays of the Condo"	2003-04-13
Frankie the Squealer	Dan Castellaneta	Informant for Fat Tony.	"Insane Clown Poppy"	2000-11-12
Professor Jonathan Frink	Hank Azaria	Scientist, inventor.	"Old Money"	1991-03-28
Alice Glick	Cloris Leachman, Tress MacNeille	Elderly.	"Three Men and a Comic Book"	1991-05-09
God	Harry Shearer	Supreme and creative preserves.	"Bart Gets Hit by a Car"	1991-01-10
Barney Gumble	Dan Castellaneta	Homer's drunken old pal.	"Simpsons Roasting on an Open Fire"	1989-12-17
Gil Gunderson	Dan Castellaneta	Unsuccessful salesman.	"Realty Bites"	1997-12-07
The Happy Little Elves	Dan Castellaneta, Hank Azaria, and Harry Shearer	Children's cartoon series characters.	"Simpsons Roasting on an Open Fire"	1989-12-17
Judge Constance Harm	Jane Kaczmarek	Springfield judge. She is very mean and she enjoys humiliating everyone.	"The Parent Rap"	2001-11-11
Herman Hermann	Harry Shearer	Owner of Herman's Military Antiques shop.	"Bart the General"	1990-02-04
Bernice Hibbert	Tress MacNeille (1999–2019) Dawnn Lewis (2021–present)	Dr. Hibbert's wife.	"Bart's Dog Gets an "F""	1991-03-07
Dr. Julius Hibbert	Harry Shearer (1990–2021); Kevin Michael Richardson (2021–present)	Medical doctor.	"Bart the Daredevil"	1990-12-06
Elizabeth Hoover	Maggie Roswell	Lisa Simpson's teacher at Springfield Elementary School.	"Brush with Greatness"	1991-04-11
Lionel Hutz	Phil Hartman †	Attorney.	"Bart Gets Hit by a Car"	1991-01-10
Itchy & Scratchy	Dan Castellaneta and Harry Shearer	Cartoon cat and mouse.	"The Bart Simpson Show"	1988-11-20
Snake Jailbird	Hank Azaria	Recidivist.	"The War of the Simpsons"	1991-05-02
Jimbo Jones	Pamela Hayden (1990–2025), Mo Collins (2025–present)	Springfield Elementary School bully.	"The Telltale Head"	1990-02-25
Kang and Kodos	Harry Shearer and Dan Castellaneta	Extraterrestrials.	"Treehouse of Horror"	1990-10-25
Princess Kashmir	Maggie Roswell	Belly dancer.	"Homer's Night Out"	1990-03-25
Edna Krabappel †	Marcia Wallace †	Bart Simpson's teacher at Springfield Elementary School (until season 25), and Ned Flanders wife (Seasons 23–25, when the character is revealed to have died).	"Bart the Genius"	1990-01-14
Coach Krupt	Hank Azaria	Sadistic gym teacher at Springfield Elementary School.	"My Fair Laddy"	2006-02-26
Rabbi Hyman Krustofsky †	Jackie Mason and Dan Castellaneta	Rabbi; father of Krusty the Clown.	"Like Father, Like Clown"	1991-10-24
Krusty the Clown	Dan Castellaneta	TV show clown host, original name Herschel Shmoikel Pinchas Yerucham Krustofski.	"The Krusty the Clown Show" (short)	1989-01-15
Cookie Kwan	Tress MacNeille	Real estate agent.	"Realty Bites"	1997-12-07
Dewey Largo	Harry Shearer	Springfield Elementary School's music teacher.	"Simpsons Roasting on an Open Fire"	1989-12-17
Legs and Louie	Harry Shearer and Dan Castellaneta	Fat Tony's henchmen.	"Bart the Murderer"	1991-10-10
Leopold	Dan Castellaneta	Superintendent Chalmers' assistant.	"Sweet Seymour Skinner's Baadasssss Song"	1994-04-28
Lenny Leonard	Harry Shearer	Springfield Nuclear Power Plant employee; one of Homer Simpson's friends.	"Life on the Fast Lane"	1990-03-18
Leprechaun	Dan Castellaneta	Male faerie from Ireland as well as Saint Patrick’s Day.	"This Little Wiggy"	1998-03-22
Helen Lovejoy	Maggie Roswell, Marcia Mitzman Gaven	Reverend Lovejoy's wife. She is married to Reverend and have a daughter together, Jessica.	"Life on the Fast Lane"	1990-03-18
Reverend Timothy Lovejoy	Harry Shearer	Minister of the First Church of Springfield. He is married to Helen and have a daughter together, Jessica.	"The Telltale Head"	1990-02-25
Lurleen Lumpkin	Beverly D'Angelo, Doris Grau	Country music singer-songwriter.	"Colonel Homer"	1992-03-26
Otto Mann	Harry Shearer	Springfield Elementary School bus driver. He often listens to music.	"Homer's Odyssey"	1990-01-21
Captain Horatio McCallister	Hank Azaria	Sea captain.	"New Kid on the Block"	1992-11-12
Roger Meyers Jr.	Alex Rocco, Dan Castellaneta	Chairman of Itchy & Scratchy International.	"Itchy & Scratchy & Marge"	1990-12-20
Troy McClure	Phil Hartman †	Actor.	"Homer vs. Lisa and the 8th Commandment"	1991-02-07
Hans Moleman	Dan Castellaneta	Unfortunate man.	"Principal Charming"	1991-02-14
Dr. Marvin Monroe	Harry Shearer	Psychotherapist.	"There's No Disgrace Like Home"	1990-01-28
Eddie Muntz	Phil Hartman, Harry Shearer, Hank Azaria, Earl Mann	Nelson's father.	"Brother from the Same Planet"	1993-02-04
Mrs. Muntz	Tress MacNeille	Nelson Muntz's mother. Although she loves her son, she can be seen alcoholic.	"Tis the Fifteenth Season"	1999-01-17
Nelson Muntz	Nancy Cartwright	Springfield Elementary School bully.	"Bart the General"	1990-02-04
Captain Lance Murdock	Dan Castellaneta	Daredevil.	"Bart the Daredevil"	1990-12-06
Bleeding Gums Murphy †	Ron Taylor, Harry Shearer, Kevin Michael Richardson	Blues musician.	"Moaning Lisa"	1990-02-11
Lindsey Naegle	Tress MacNeille	Corporate executive.	"The Itchy & Scratchy & Poochie Show"	1997-02-09
Apu Nahasapeemapetilon	Hank Azaria (1990–2017), Sunil Malhotra (2026–present)	Operator of the Kwik-E-Mart.	"The Telltale Head"	1990-02-25
Manjula Nahasapeemapetilon	Jan Hooks (1997–2002), Tress MacNeille (2002–present), Janina Gavankar (2026–present)	Apu Nahasapeemapetilon's wife.	"Much Apu About Nothing"	1997-11-16
Sanjay Nahasapeemapetilon	Harry Shearer	Apu Nahasapeemapetilon's younger brother.	"Homer vs. Lisa and the 8th Commandment"	1991-02-07
Jake	Dan Castellaneta, Harry Shearer	Barber.	"Simpson and Delilah"	1990-10-18
Old Jewish Man	Hank Azaria	Springfield Retirement Castle resident.	"Krusty Gets Kancelled"	1993-05-13
Rayshelle Peyton	Kerry Washington	Bart Simpson's teacher at Springfield Elementary School. Unlike most of the teachers, she is very kind.	"My Octopus and a Teacher”	2022-04-24
Herbert Powell	Danny DeVito	Homer Simpson's half-brother.	"Oh Brother, Where Art Thou?"	1991-02-21
Janey Powell	Pamela Hayden, Kimberly Brooks	Student at Springfield Elementary School.	"Moaning Lisa"	1990-02-11
Ruth Powers	Pamela Reed, Maggie Roswell	The Simpsons' next door neighbor.	"New Kid on the Block"	1992-11-12
Gareth Prince	Dan Castellaneta, Chris Edgerly, Hank Azaria	Martin’s father.	"Bart the Genius"	1990-01-14
Gloria Prince	Russi Taylor and Pamela Hayden	Martin Prince’s mother.	"Bart the Genius"	1990-01-14
Martin Prince	Russi Taylor (1990–2019) Grey DeLisle (2019–present)	Student at Springfield Elementary School.	"Bart the Genius"	1990-01-14
Loren Pryor	Harry Shearer	Springfield Elementary's school psychologist.	"Bart the Genius"	1990-01-14
Arnie Pye	Dan Castellaneta	Channel 6 helicopter reporter.	"Homer Alone"	1992-02-06
Martha Quimby	Maggie Roswell	Long wife of the Mayor of Springfield Joe Quimby.	"Bart Gets Famous"	1994-02-03
Mayor "Diamond" Joe Quimby	Dan Castellaneta	Mayor of Springfield.	"The Call of the Simpsons"	1990-10-11
Radioactive Man	Harry Shearer	Comic book superhero.	"Three Men and a Comic Book"	1991-05-09
The Rich Texan	Dan Castellaneta	Philanthropist.	"$pringfield (Or, How I Learned to Stop Worrying and Love Legalized Gambling)"	1993-12-16
Richard	Pamela Hayden, Nancy Cartwright, Maggie Roswell	Student at Springfield Elementary School.	"Bart the Genius"	1990-01-14
Luigi Risotto	Hank Azaria	Italian restaurant proprietor.	"Sweet Seymour Skinner's Baadasssss Song"	1994-04-28
Mrs. Risotto	Tress MacNeille	Luigi's mother.	"Much Apu About Something"	2016-01-17
Dr. Nick Riviera	Hank Azaria	Incompetent medical doctor. Injured at the end of the movie by a falling chunk of glass, and brought back in nineteenth season.	"Bart Gets Hit by a Car"	1991-01-10
Santa's Little Helper	Dan Castellaneta, Frank Welker	The Simpson family's pet dog.	"Simpsons Roasting on an Open Fire"	1989-12-17
Sherri and Terri	Russi Taylor (1990–2019) Grey DeLisle (2019–present)	Identical twins; Students at Springfield Elementary School.	"Homer's Odyssey"	1990-01-21
Dave Shutton	Harry Shearer	Reporter for The Springfield Shopper.	"Two Cars in Every Garage and Three Eyes on Every Fish"	1990-11-01
Robert Terwilliger/Sideshow Bob	Kelsey Grammer	Criminal mastermind and Krusty the Clown Show ex-operator and sidekick.	"The Telltale Head"	1990-02-25
Sideshow Mel	Dan Castellaneta	The Krusty the Clown Show sidekick.	"Itchy & Scratchy & Marge"	1990-12-20
Grampa Simpson	Dan Castellaneta	Homer Simpson's father; Bart, Lisa, and Maggie Simpson's grandfather.	"Grandpa and the Kids" (The Simpsons shorts)	1988-01-10
Mona Simpson	Glenn Close, Tress MacNeille, Maggie Roswell	Estranged mother of Homer Simpson and wife of Abe Simpson.	"Oh Brother, Where Art Thou?"	1991-02-21
Agnes Skinner	Tress MacNeille	Seymour Skinner's mother. She keeps controlling her son and making him hating her. She is jealous of Edna.	"The Crepes of Wrath"	1990-04-15
Seymour Skinner	Harry Shearer	Principal of Springfield Elementary School. Despite saving her from danger, he hates his mother Agnes because she controls him. He often catches Bart when he is doing pranks on him. He was dating Edna before her death.	"Simpsons Roasting on an Open Fire"	1989-12-17
Waylon Smithers	Harry Shearer	Mr. Burns's personal assistant. He is often scolded by his boss whenever he does something bad.	"Simpsons Roasting on an Open Fire"	1989-12-17
Snowball II	Frank Welker, Dan Castellaneta	The Simpson family's pet cats. Lisa adores them.	"Simpsons Roasting on an Open Fire"	1989-12-17
Roy Snyder	Harry Shearer (1991–2020); Kevin Michael Richardson (2024–present)	Springfield judge.	"Krusty Gets Busted"	1990-04-29
Jebediah Springfield	Harry Shearer	Founder of Springfield; local hero.	"The Telltale Head"	1990-02-25
Cletus Spuckler	Hank Azaria	Slack-Jawed Yokel.	"Bart Gets an Elephant"	1994-03-31
Birthday Spuckler	Pamela Hayden	Cletus and Brandine Spuckler’s children.	"Yokel Chords"	2007-03-04
Brandine Spuckler	Tress MacNeille	Cletus Spuckler's wife and sister.	"Scenes from the Class Struggle in Springfield"	1996-02-04
Crystal Meth Spuckler	Nancy Cartwright	Cletus Spuckler and Brandine Spuckler’s children.	"Yokel Chords"	2007-03-04
Dubya Spuckler	Tress MacNeille	Cletus and Brandine’s children.	"Yokel Chords"	2007-03-04
Incest Spuckler	Dan Castellaneta	Cletus and Brandine’s children.	"Yokel Chords"	2007-03-04
Jitney Spuckler	Pamela Hayden	Cletus and Brandine Spuckler’s children.	"Yokel Chords"	2007-03-04
Whitney Spuckler	Tress MacNeille	Cletus Spuckler and Brandine Spuckler’s children.	"Yokel Chords"	2007-03-04
Squeaky-Voiced Teen	Dan Castellaneta	Service industry.	"Dog of Death"	1991-02-14
Moe Szyslak	Hank Azaria	Owner of Moe's Tavern.	"Simpsons Roasting on an Open Fire"	1989-12-17
Drederick Tatum	Hank Azaria and Jay Pharoah	Professional boxer, a caricature of Mike Tyson.	"Homer vs. Lisa and the 8th Commandment"	1991-02-07
Allison Taylor	Winona Ryder, Pamela Hayden, Tress MacNeille	Student at Springfield Elementary School.	"Lisa's Rival"	1994-09-11
Mr. Teeny	Dan Castellaneta	The Krusty the Clown Show trained monkey.	"Like Father, Like Clown"	1991-10-24
Johnny Tightlips	Hank Azaria	One of Fat Tony's henchmen.	"Insane Clown Poppy"	2000-11-12
Kirk Van Houten	Hank Azaria	Milhouse Van Houten's father; factory worker.	"Bart's Friend Falls in Love"	1992-05-07
Luann Van Houten	Maggie Roswell	Kirk Van Houten's wife; Milhouse's mother. She loves hanging out with girls.	"Homer Defined"	1991-10-17
Milhouse Van Houten	Pamela Hayden (1989–2025), Kelly MacLeod (2025–present)	Bart Simpson's best friend; Student at Springfield Elementary School. He and Bart became best friends when they are in kindergarten. He is very shy and he is often bullied by Nelson.	"Simpsons Roasting on an Open Fire"	1989-12-17
Police Chief Clancy Wiggum	Hank Azaria	Springfield Chief of Police.	"Homer's Odyssey"	1990-01-21
Ralph Wiggum	Nancy Cartwright	Son of Police Chief Clancy Wiggum. He is shown to be playful and often giggles when he is having fun.	"Simpsons Roasting on an Open Fire"	1989-12-17
Sarah Wiggum	Pamela Hayden and Megan Mullally	Chief Wiggum's wife; Ralph Wiggum's mother.	"Duffless"	1993-02-18
Groundskeeper Willie	Dan Castellaneta	Janitor of Springfield Elementary School. He might be irritated, and once he dreams about him getting married.	"Principal Charming"	1991-02-14
Raphael	Hank Azaria	Service industry.	"The Way We Was"	1991-01-31
Rainier Wolfcastle (McBain)	Harry Shearer, Hank Azaria	Actor; star of McBain films.	"The Way We Was"	1991-01-31
Hubert Wong	Tress MacNeille, Simu Liu (adult); Rosalie Chiang (child)	Lisa's classmate and intellectual rival. In the future, he is shown to be married at Lisa.	"Treehouse of Horror XX"	2009-10-18
The Yes Guy	Dan Castellaneta	Service industry.	"Mayored to the Mob"	1998-12-20
Artie Ziff	Jon Lovitz, Dan Castellaneta	Former billionaire and Marge's prom date.	"The Way We Was"	1991-01-31
Üter Zörker	Russi Taylor (1993–2016), Grey DeLisle (2025–present)	Student at Springfield Elementary School.	"Treehouse of Horror IV"	1993-10-28
Kearney Zzyzwicz	Nancy Cartwright	Springfield Elementary School bully.	"The Telltale Head"	1990-02-25

== Appearances ==
List indicators
- M A green cell indicates the character has a main role in that season.
- R A red cell indicates the character has a recurring role in that season. (Note: When referring to The Simpsons Movie, a red cell indicates the character was present in the movie.)
- G A light blue cell indicates the character has a guest role in that season. (Note: A blue cell, with a 'V', indicates the character appears via voice only.)
- A light gray cell indicates the character did not appear in that season.
- O A light gray cell, with an 'O', indicates the character appears only in the opening sequence (including the couch gag and title screen).

Character	Appearances																																						
Character	1	2	3	4	5	6	7	8	9	10	11	12	13	14	15	16	17	18	Mo	19	20	21	22	23	24	25	26	27	28	29	30	31	32	33	34	35	36	37	38
Main characters
Homer Simpson	M	M	M	M	M	M	M	M	M	M	M	M	M	M	M	M	M	M	M	M	M	M	M	M	M	M	M	M	M	M	M	M	M	M	M	M	M	M	M
Marge Simpson	M	M	M	M	M	M	M	M	M	M	M	M	M	M	M	M	M	M	M	M	M	M	M	M	M	M	M	M	M	M	M	M	M	M	M	M	M	M	M
Bart Simpson	M	M	M	M	M	M	M	M	M	M	M	M	M	M	M	M	M	M	M	M	M	M	M	M	M	M	M	M	M	M	M	M	M	M	M	M	M	M	M
Lisa Simpson	M	M	M	M	M	M	M	M	M	M	M	M	M	M	M	M	M	M	M	M	M	M	M	M	M	M	M	M	M	M	M	M	M	M	M	M	M	M	M
Maggie Simpson	M	M	M	M	M	M	M	M	M	M	M	M	M	M	M	M	M	M	M	M	M	M	M	M	M	M	M	M	M	M	M	M	M	M	M	M	M	M	M
Major supporting characters
Abraham Simpson	R	R	R	R	R	R	R	R	R	R	R	R	R	R	R	R	R	R	R	R	R	R	R	R	R	R	R	R	R	R	R	R	R	R	R	R	R	R	R
Mr. Burns	R	R	R	R	R	R	R	R	R	R	R	R	R	R	R	R	R	R	R	R	R	R	R	R	R	R	R	R	R	R	R	R	R	R	R	R	R	R	R
Waylon Smithers	R	R	R	R	R	R	R	R	R	R	R	R	R	R	R	R	R	R	R	R	R	R	R	R	R	R	R	R	R	R	R	R	R	R	R	R	R	R	R
Ned Flanders	R	R	R	R	R	R	R	R	R	R	R	R	R	R	R	R	R	R	R	R	R	R	R	R	R	R	R	R	R	R	R	R	R	R	R	R	R	R	R
Moe Szyslak	R	R	R	R	R	R	R	R	R	R	R	R	R	R	R	R	R	R	R	R	R	R	R	R	R	R	R	R	R	R	R	R	R	R	R	R	R	R	R
Barney Gumble	R	R	R	R	R	R	R	R	R	R	R	R	R	R	R	R	R	R	R	R	R	R	R	R	R	R	R	R	R	R	R	R	R	R	R	R	R	R	R
Milhouse Van Houten	R	R	R	R	R	R	R	R	R	R	R	R	R	R	R	R	R	R	R	R	R	R	R	R	R	R	R	R	R	R	R	R	R	R	R	R	R	R	R
Patty Bouvier	R	R	R	R	R	R	R	R	R	R	R	R	R	R	R	R	R	R	R	R	R	R	R	R	R	R	R	R	R	R	R	R	R	R	R	R	R	R	R
Selma Bouvier	R	R	R	R	R	R	R	R	R	R	R	R	R	R	R	R	R	R	R	R	R	R	R	R	R	R	R	R	R	R	R	R	R	R	R	R	R	R	R
Edna Krabappel	R	R	R	R	R	R	R	R	R	R	R	R	R	R	R	R	R	R	R	R	R	R	R	R	R	R	G		G	G	G	G	G	G	O				
Principal Seymour Skinner	R	R	R	R	R	R	R	R	R	R	R	R	R	R	R	R	R	R	R	R	R	R	R	R	R	R	R	R	R	R	R	R	R	R	R	R	R	R	R
Krusty the Clown	R	R	R	R	R	R	R	R	R	R	R	R	R	R	R	R	R	R	R	R	R	R	R	R	R	R	R	R	R	R	R	R	R	R	R	R	R	R	R
Martin Prince	R	R	R	R	R	R	R	R	R	R	R	R	R	R	R	R	R	R	R	R	R	R	R	R	R	R	R	R	R	R	R	R	R	R	R	R	R	R	R
Apu Nahasapeemapetilon	R	R	R	R	R	R	R	R	R	R	R	R	R	R	R	R	R	R	R	R	R	R	R	R	R	R	R	R	R	R	R	R	R	R	R	G	G	G	R
Chief Clancy Wiggum	R	R	R	R	R	R	R	R	R	R	R	R	R	R	R	R	R	R	R	R	R	R	R	R	R	R	R	R	R	R	R	R	R	R	R	R	R	R	R
Reverend Timothy Lovejoy	R	R	R	R	R	R	R	R	R	R	R	R	R	R	R	R	R	R	R	R	R	R	R	R	R	R	R	R	R	R	R	R	R	R	R	R	R	R	R
Otto Mann	R	R	R	R	R	R	R	R	R	R	R	R	R	R	R	R	R	R	R	R	R	R	R	R	R	R	R	R	R	R	R	R	R	R	R	R	R	R	R
Lenny Leonard	R	R	R	R	R	R	R	R	R	R	R	R	R	R	R	R	R	R	R	R	R	R	R	R	R	R	R	R	R	R	R	R	R	R	R	R	R	R	R
Carl Carlson	G	R	R	R	R	R	R	R	R	R	R	R	R	R	R	R	R	R	R	R	R	R	R	R	R	R	R	R	R	R	R	R	R	R	R	R	R	R	R
Kent Brockman	G	R	R	R	R	R	R	R	R	R	R	R	R	R	R	R	R	R	R	R	R	R	R	R	R	R	R	R	R	R	R	R	R	R	R	R	R	R	R
Nelson Muntz	G	R	R	R	R	R	R	R	R	R	R	R	R	R	R	R	R	R	R	R	R	R	R	R	R	R	R	R	R	R	R	R	R	R	R	R	R	R	R
Ralph Wiggum	G	G	R	R	R	R	R	R	R	R	R	R	R	R	R	R	R	R	R	R	R	R	R	R	R	R	R	R	R	R	R	R	R	R	R	R	R	R	R
Dr. Julius Hibbert		R	R	R	R	R	R	R	R	R	R	R	R	R	R	R	R	R	R	R	R	R	R	R	R	R	R	R	R	R	R	R	R	R	R	R	R	R	R
Mayor Joe Quimby		R	R	R	R	R	R	R	R	R	G	R	R	R	R	R	R	R	R	R	R	R	R	R	R	R	R	R	R	R	R	R	R	R	R	R	R	R	R
Lionel Hutz		R	R	R	R	R	R	R	R	G		G		R		G	G									G	O								O				
Groundskeeper Willie		G	R	R	R	R	R	R	R	R	R	R	R	R	R	R	R	R	R	R	R	R	R	R	R	R	R	R	R	R	R	R	R	R	R	R	R	R	R
Professor Jonathan Frink		G	R	R	R	R	R	R	R	R	R	R	R	R	R	R	R	R	R	R	R	R	R	R	R	R	R	R	R	R	R	R	R	R	R	R	R	R	R
Snake Jailbird		G	R	R	R	R	R	R	R	R	R	R	R	R	R	R	R	R	R	R	R	R	R	R	R	R	R	R	R	R	R	R	R	R	R	R	R	R	R
Comic Book Guy		G	G		R	R	R	R	R	R	R	R	R	R	R	R	R	R	R	R	R	R	R	R	R	R	R	R	R	R	R	R	R	R	R	R	R	R	R
Fat Tony			G		G	G	R	R	G	R	R	R	R	R	R	R	G	R	R	R	R	R	R	R	G	R	R	R	R	R	G	R	R	R	R	R	R	R	R
Superintendent Gary Chalmers				G	G	R	R	R	R	R	R	R	R	R	R	R	R	R	R	R	R	R	R	R	R	R	R	R	R	R	R	R	R	R	R	R	R	R	R
Cletus Spuckler					G	G	R	R	R	R	R	R	R	R	R	R	R	R	R	R	R	R	R	R	R	R	R	R	R	R	R	R	R	R	R	R	R	R	R
Recurring characters
Jasper Beardsley	R	R	R	R	R	R	R	R	R	R	R	R	R	R	R	R	R	R	R	R	R	R	R	R	R	R	R	R	R	R	R	R	R	R	R	R	R	R	R
Lou	R	R	R	R	R	R	R	R	R	R	R	R	R	R	R	R	R	R	R	R	R	R	R	R	R	R	R	R	R	R	R	R	R	R	R	R	R	R	R
Eddie	R	R	R	R	R	R	R	R	R	R	R	R	R	R	R	R	R	R	R	R	R	R	R	R	R	R	R	R	R	R	R	R	R	R	R	R	R	R	R
Dr. Marvin Monroe	R	R	R	G	G	O	O	O	O	O	O	O	O	O	G	O	O	O		O	O						G	O		G							G		G
Dewey Largo	R	R	G	R	R	R	R	R	R	R	R	R	R	R	R	R	R	R	R	R	R	R	R	R	R	R	R	R	R	R	R	R	R	R	R	R	R	R	R
Sherri & Terri	R	R	R	R	R	R	R	R	R	R	R	R	R	R	R	R	R	R	R	R	R	R	R	R	R	R	R	R	R	R	R	R	R	R	R	R	R	R	R
Helen Lovejoy	G	R	R	R	R	R	R	R	R	R	R	R	R	R	R	R	R	R	R	R	R	R	R	R	R	R	R	R	R	R	R	R	R	R	R	R	R	R	R
Jimbo Jones	G	R	R	R	R	R	R	R	R	R	R	R	R	R	R	R	R	R	R	R	R	R	R	R	R	R	R	R	R	R	R	R	R	R	R	R	R	R	R
Kearney Zzyzwicz	G	G	R	R	R	R	R	R	R	R	R	R	R	R	R	R	R	R	R	R	R	R	R	R	R	R	R	R	R	R	R	R	R	R	R	R	R	R	R
Dolph Starbeam	G	G	R	R	R	R	R	R	R	G	R	R	R	R	R	R	R	R	R	R	R	R	R	R	R	R	R	R	R	R	R	R	R	R	R	R	R	R	R
Rod Flanders	G	R	R	R	R	R	R	R	R	R	R	R	R	R	R	R	R	R	R	R	R	R	R	R	R	R	R	R	R	R	R	R	R	R	R	R	R	R	R
Todd Flanders	G	R	R	R	R	R	R	R	R	R	R	R	R	R	R	R	R	R	R	R	R	R	R	R	R	R	R	R	R	R	R	R	R	R	R	R	R	R	R
Agnes Skinner	G	G	G	G	R	R	R	R	R	R	R	R	R	R	R	R	R	R	R	R	R	R	R	R	R	R	R	R	R	R	R	R	R	R	R	R	R	R	R
Old Jewish Man	G	G		R	R	R	R	R	R	R	R	R	R	R	R	R	R	R	R	R	R	R	R	R	R	R	R	R	R	R	R	R	R	R	R	R	R	R	R
Herman Hermann	G	R	R	G	R	R	R	R	R	R	R	R	G	R	R	R	G	G		G	R	G	G	G	R	R	G	R	R	R	R	R	R	G	R	R	R	R	R
Jacqueline Bouvier	G	R	R	R	G	R	G	R							R	R	G					G	G	O		G	G	R	G	G	R	R	R	R		R	O	R	G
Judge Roy Snyder	G	G	G	R	G	G	G	G	R	R		R	R	R	R	R	G	G		G	G	G	G	R	R	G	R	G	G		R	R	R	G	G	G	G	G	R
Sideshow Bob	G		G	G	G	G	G	G				G		G		O	G			G	G	R	O	G	R	R	R	R	R	R	O	G	G	G	G	G	G	G	G
Bleeding Gums Murphy	G	R	R	G	O	G	O	O	O	O	O	O	O	O	O	O	O	O		O	G				G			O		R			G	G	G				
Maude Flanders		R	R	R	R	R	R	R	R	R	R	G	O	G	O	O	O	O		O	G	G		R			O	G	G	R	G	G	G	G	G		G		G
Sideshow Mel		R	R	R	R	R	R	R	R	R	R	R	R	R	R	R	R	R	R	R	R	R	R	R	R	R	R	R	R	R	R	R	R	R	R	R	R	R	R
Dr. Nick Riviera		R	R	R	G	G	R	R	R	R	R	R	R	R	R	R	R	R	R	G	R	R	G	G	R	R	R	R	R	R	R	R	G	R	G	G	G	G	G
Troy McClure		R	R	R	R	R	R	R	R	G				G	G													O		G					O				
Elizabeth Hoover		R	R	R	R	R	R	R	R	R	R	R	R	R	R	R	R	R	R	R	R	R	R	R	R	R	R	R	R	R	R	R	R	R	R	R	R	R	R
Rainier Wolfcastle		R	G	R	R	R	G	R	R	G	R	R	R	R	R	R	R	R	R	R	R	R	G	R	R	R	R	R	R	R	R	R	R	R	R	R	R	R	R
Wise Guy		R	G	R	G	R	R	R	R	R	R	R	G	R	R	R	R	R	R	R	R	R	R	R	R	R	R	R	R	R	R	R	R	R	R	R	R	R	R
Hans Moleman		G	G	R	R	R	R	R	R	R	R	R	R	R	R	R	R	R	R	R	R	R	R	R	R	R	R	R	R	R	R	R	R	R	R	R	R	R	R
Squeaky-Voiced Teen		G		R	R	R	R	G	R	R	R	R	R	R	R	R	R	R	R	R	R	R	R	R	R	R	R	R	R	R	R	R	R	R	R	R	R	R	R
Blue-Haired Lawyer		G	R	R	R	G	G	R	R	G	G	G	R	R	R	G	R	G	R	R	R	R	G	R	R	R	R	R	R	R	R	R	R	R	R	R	R	R	R
Drederick Tatum		G	G	G				G		G		G	R	R	R	G	R	G		G	R	R	R	R	R	R	R	R	R	R	R	R	R	R	R	R	R	R	R
Kang & Kodos		G	G	G	G	G	G	G	G	G	R	G	R	R	G	G	G	G		G	O	G	G	G	G	G	R	G	G	G	G	R	O	G	R	G	R	R	R
Mona Simpson		G				G	G			G		G			G	G	G			G				G	G	G	G	G	G	G		G		G	O		G	G	G
Artie Ziff		G		G									G		G						G				G		O			G		G	G		O		G	G	G
Roger Meyers Jr.		G	G	G	G	G	G	G	G							G	G	G		G	G		G	G			O		G						O		G	G	G
Bernice Hibbert		G		R	R	R	R	R	R	R	R	R	R	R	R	R	R	R	R	R	R	R	R	R	R	R	R	R	R	R	R	R	R	R	R	R	R	R	R
Alice Glick		G		G	G		R	R	R	G	R	R	R	R	R	R	R	R	R	R	R	G	R	R	G	G	R			G	G	G	G	G	G	G	R	G	
Akira Kurosawa		G	R	G				G	G		G	R	G			G						G	R	R	R	G	R	G	R	R	R	R	R	R	G	R	R	R	R
Luann Van Houten			R	G	R	R	R	R	R	R	R	R	R	R	R	R	R	R	R	R	R	R	R	R	R	R	R	R	R	R	R	R	R	R	R	R	R	R	R
Kirk Van Houten			G	G	R	R	R	R	R	R	R	R	R	R	R	R	R	R	R	R	R	R	R	R	R	R	R	R	R	R	R	R	R	R	R	R	R	R	R
Lunchlady Doris			G	R	G	R	R	R	R	R	R	R	G	R	R	R		R		G	R	R	R	R	R	R	R	R	R	R	R	R	R	R	R	R	R	R	R
Arnie Pye			G	R		R	R	G	G	G	G	R	G	G	R	G		G	R	R	G	G	R	R	R	R	R	G	R	R	G	R	G	R	R	R	R	R	R
Louie			G	G		G	G	R	R	R	G	R	R	R	R	R	G	R	R	G	G	R	R	R	G	R	R		R	R	G	R	R	R	R	G	R	R	R
Legs			G	G		G		R	G	R	G	R	R	R	R	R	R	R	R	G	G	R	R	R	G	R	G	G	R	R	G	R	G	R	R	G	R	R	R
Hyman Krustofski			G	G										G	G	R	G	G				G	G	R	R		G		G	R	G				G				
Sea Captain				R	R	R	R	R	R	R	R	R	R	R	R	R	R	R	R	R	R	R	R	R	R	R	R	R	R	R	R	R	R	R	R	R	R	R	R
Bumblebee Man				R	R	R	R	R	R	R	R	R	R	R	R	R	R	R	R	R	R	R	R	R	R	R	R	R	R	R	G	R	R	R	R	R	R	R	R
Ruth Powers				R	G	R	R	R	R	R	R	R	R	R	R	R	R	R	R	R	R	R	R	R	R	R	R	R	R	R	R	R	G	R	R	R	R	R	R
Miss Springfield				G	G									G		G	R	G		G	G	G	G	R	O	G	G	G	R	G	O	G	O	O	R	G	R	R	R
Sarah Wiggum				G	G	G	R	R	R	R	R	R	R	R	R	R	R	R	R	R	R	R	R	R	R	R	R	R	R	R	R	R	R	R	R	R	R	R	R
Luigi Risotto					R	R	G			G	G	G	R	R	R	R	R	R	R	R	R	O	R	R	R	R	R	R	R	R	R	R	G	R	R	R	R	R	R
The Rich Texan					G	R		G	R	G	G	R	R	R	R	R	R	R	R	R	R	G	R	R	R	R	R	R	R	R	O	R	G	G	R	R	R	R	R
Baby Gerald					G			G	G		G	G			G		R			G	R	G	G	G	G	R	R	R	G	O	R	R	G	R	G	G	G	G	G
Üter Zörker					G	R	R	G	G	G		R	G		G	R	G	R	R	G	G	G	G	G	R	G	O	R	G	G	R	R	G	O	R	G	R	R	R
Database						R		R	R	R	G	R	R	R	R	G	R	R	R	R	G	R	R	R	R	R	R	R	R	R	R	R	R	G	R	R	G	R	R
Brandine Spuckler							R	R	R	G	R	R	R	R	R	R	R	R	R	R	R	R	R	R	R	R	R	R	R	R	R	R	R	R	R	R	R	R	R
Disco Stu							G	R	R		R	R	R	R	R	R	R	R	R	R	R	R	R	R	R	R	R	R	R	R	R	R	R	R	R	R	R	R	R
Manjula Nahasapeemapetilon							G		R	R	R	R	R	R	R	R	R	R	R	R	R	R	R	R	R	R	R	R	R	R	R	R	R	R	G	G	G	G	G
Lindsey Naegle								G	G	G	R	R	R	R	R	R	R	R	R	R	R	R	R	R	R	R	R	R	R	R	R	R	R	R	R	R	R	R	R
Gil Gunderson									R	R	R	G	R	R	R	G	R	R	R	R	R	R	R	R	R	R	R	R	R	R	R	R	R	R	R	R	R	R	R
Crazy Cat Lady									G						R	R	R	R	R	G	R	G	R	R	R	R	R	G	R	R	G	R	G	R	R	R	R	R	R
Duffman									G		G	G	R	R	R	G	R		R	R	R	G	G	G	R	R	R	R	G	R	R	R	G	R	G	R	R	R	G
Cookie Kwan									G				G	R	R	R	R	R	R	G	R	R	R	R	R	R	R	R	R	R	R	R	R	R	R	R	R	R	R
Mrs. Vanderbilt									G		G	R	R							G		R	R			G				G	G			G	O	G	R	R	R
The Yes Guy										G		G	R	R	R	G	G	G		G										G		G	G		O	R	R	R	R
Mrs. Muntz										V					G	G	G	G	R	R	G	R	R	R	R	R	R	R	R	R	R	R	R	R	R	R	R	R	R
Johnny Tightlips												G	G	R	G	G	G	G				G	R	G	G	R	G		G	G	G	R	R	R	R	G	R	R	R
Booberella														G	G	G	G	G		G		G	G				G		G	G				G	O				
Julio Franco														G		G		G		G	G	G	R	G	G	G	R	R	G	G	R	R	R	R	R	R	R	R	R
Shauna Chalmers																				G	G	G	G	R	R	G	R	R	R	R	R	R	R	R	R	R	R	R	R
Kumiko Albertson																									G	R	R	R	R	R	R	R	R	R	R	R	R	R	R
Rayshelle Peyton																																		G	R	R	R	R	R
Animals
Santa's Little Helper	R	R	R	R	R	R	R	R	R	R	R	R	R	R	R	R	R	R	R	R	R	R	R	R	R	R	R	R	R	R	R	R	R	R	R	R	R	R	R
Snowball II	R	R	R	R	R	R	R	R	R	R	R	R	R	R	G												O			G		G							
Itchy & Scratchy	R	R	R	R	R	R	R	R	G	G	G	R	R	G	R	R	R	G	R	R	G	R	R	R	R	R	R	G	R	R	R		R	G	R	G	G	G	G
Mr. Teeny		G	R	G	G		R		G	G		R		R	R	R	R	R	R	R	R	R	O	R	R	R	R	R	R	R	R	R	R	G	G	G	G	G	G
Snowball V															R	R	R	R	R	R	R	R	R	R	R	R	R	R	R	R	R	R	R	R	R	R	R	R	R
