= Lionel (given name) =

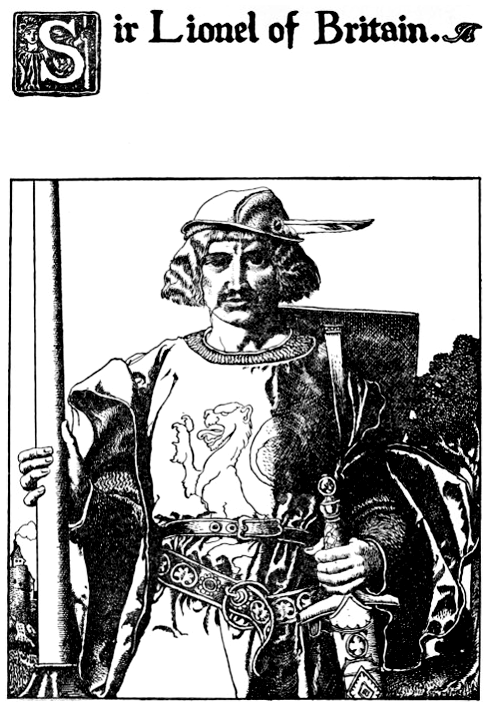
- Sir Lionel is a character from Arthurian legend.
- Gender: Masculine
- Language: English and French via Greek ( Leon of Sparta)

Origin
- Meaning: “Little lion”

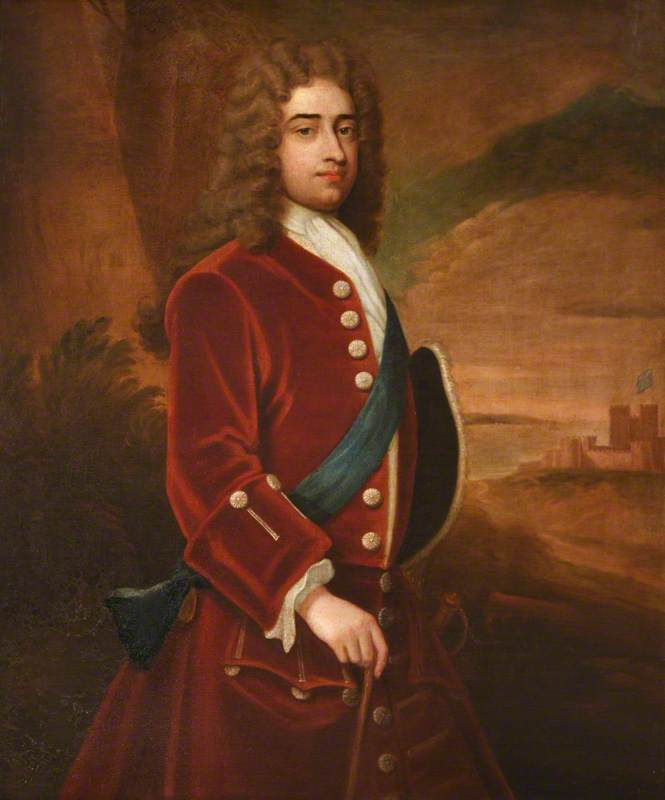
Lionel Sackville, 1st Duke of Dorset (1688–1765)

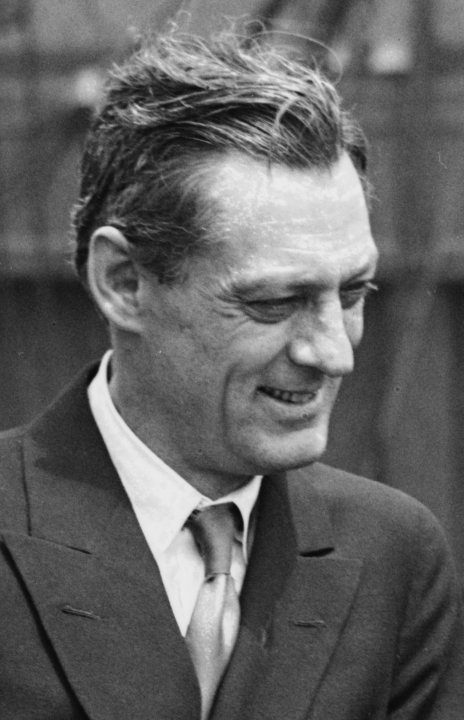
American actor Lionel Barrymore (1878–1954), pictured in 1923

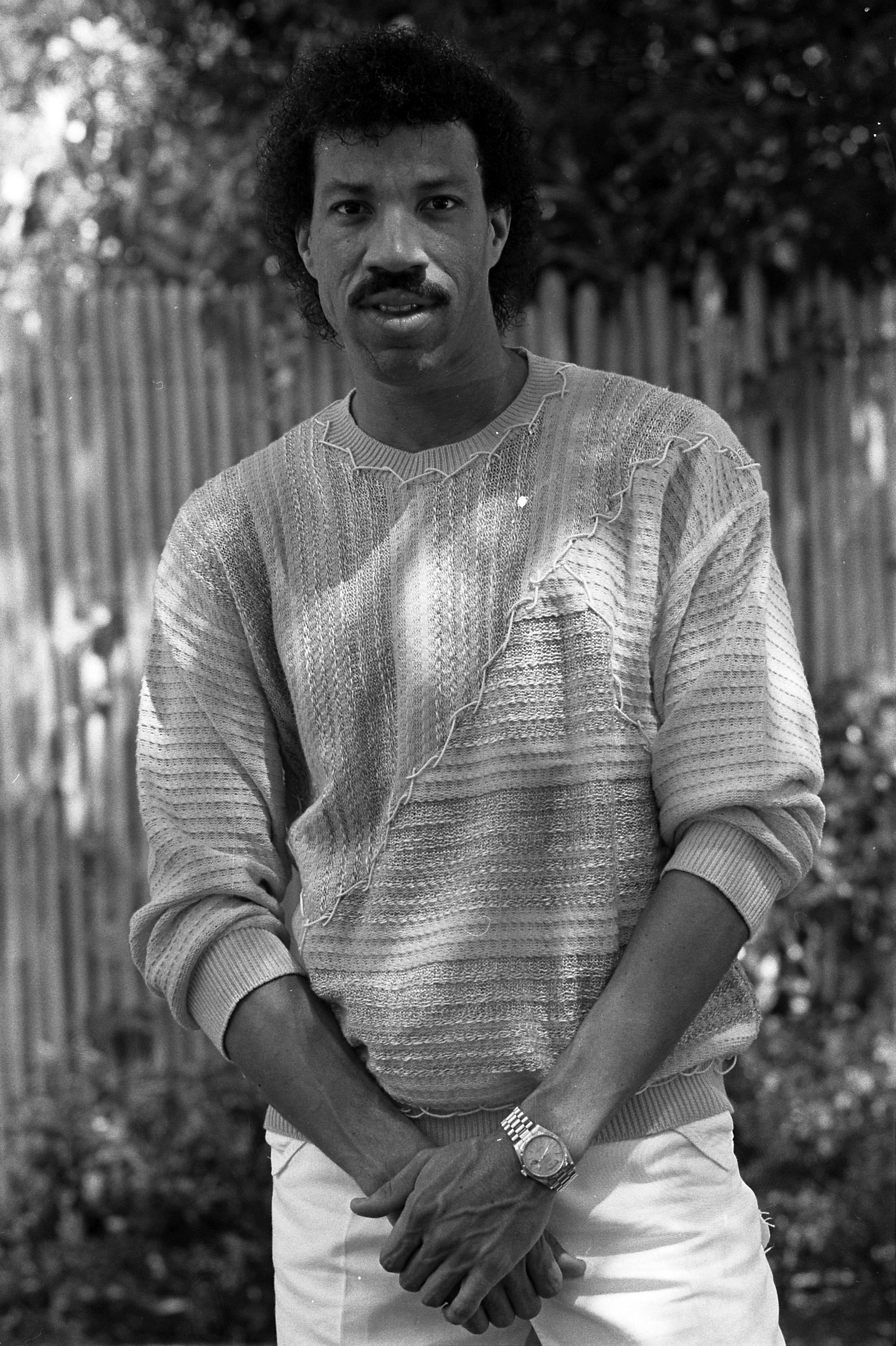
American singer Lionel Richie (born 1949), pictured at the height of his fame in 1984

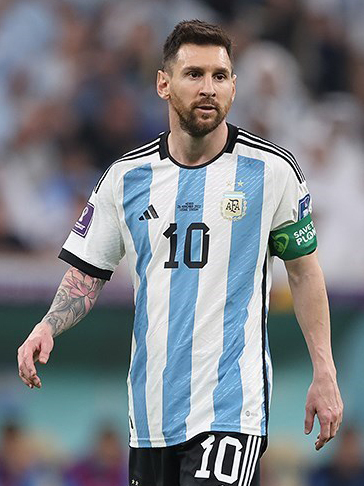
Argentine soccer player Lionel Messi (born 1987), pictured in 2022

Lionel is a masculine given name which originated as a French diminutive of Léon. Both names are derived from the Greek word “leon,” meaning “lion”.

== Usage ==
The name has been in regular use since the Middle Ages. It was popularized in the Anglosphere by Sir Lionel, a character in Arthurian Legend. Edward III of England portrayed this character in Arthurian-themed tournaments and named his son, Lionel of Antwerp, Duke of Clarence, for Sir Lionel. The name was in occasional use by British nobility such as Lionel Sackville, 1st Duke of Dorset (1688–1765), and for literary characters, including Lionel Lincoln, titular character of American author James Fenimore Cooper’s 1825 novel. The name was less popular in the United States than in the United Kingdom during the mid-19th century due to the negative impressions Americans had of Cooper’s character, a British Army major who refuses to join the American side during the American Revolutionary War.

The name Lionel later increased in use worldwide during the late 19th and early 20th centuries. American actor Lionel Barrymore increased attention to the name. The name had an upper class, aristocratic image in the United States that had greater appeal to African Americans than it did to White Americans. Lionel was a name more commonly used for black American boys than for American boys of other races during the mid-20th century. This was reinforced to some degree by the fame of American singer Lionel Richie. The name Lionel declined in use in the United States after 2002, but has again increased in use in the 2020s, particularly among Hispanic and Latino Americans families, due to the fame of Argentine footballer Lionel Messi. Lionel was among the 1,000 most popular names for American boys at different times between 1880 and 1998 and again between 2010 and 2023. In the United Kingdom, Lionel was among the top 100 names for boys until 1924. It has since declined in use for British boys. Lionel was among the top 100 names for boys in New Zealand between 1900 and 1935. It was among the 100 most popular names for boys in France between 1933 and 1988 and was among the top 500 names for French boys between 1900 and 2003. In Switzerland, the name has been among the 100 most popular names for boys since 2007. In French-speaking Quebec, Canada, Lionel has been among the 100 most popular names for boys since 2021.

It may refer to one of the following persons:

== People ==
All male, unless otherwise noted.

- Lionel (artist) an anonymous street artist based in Guelph, Ontario
- Lionel (radio personality) (born 1958), an American radio talk show host
- Lionel of Antwerp, 1st Duke of Clarence (1338–1368), son of King Edward III of England
- Lionel Aingimea (born 1965), President of Nauru (2019–2022)
- Lionel Algama (1935–2008), Sri Lankan Sinhala musician and composer
- Lionel Antoine (1950–2021), American football player
- Lionel Balagalle, general, Commander of the Sri Lanka Army from 2000 to 2004
- Lionel Barber (born 1955), English journalist
- Lionel Barrymore (1878–1954), American actor
- Lionel Bart (1930–1999), British composer
- Lionel Bender (1934–2008), American author and linguist
- Lionel Blair (1928–2021), British dancer and actor
- Lionel Bordeaux (1940–2022), Native American educator
- Lionel Bowen (1922–2012), Australian politician
- Lionel Boyce (born 1991), American actor, writer, producer, and musician
- Lionel Bussey (1883–1969), British engineer and collector of women's shoes
- Lionel Herbert Clarke (1859–1921), Canadian businessman and Lieutenant Governor of Ontario
- Lionel Cohen (disambiguation), various people
- Lionel Constable (1828–1887), British artist
- Lionel Cox (disambiguation), various people
- Lionel Cranfield (disambiguation), various people
- Lionel Cust (1859–1929), British art historian, courtier and museum director
- Lionel Herbert Dahmer, father of Jeffrey Dahmer
- Lionel Henry Daiches (1911–1999), Scottish Queen's Counsel
- Lionel Deraniyagala (1940–1994), Sri Lankan Sinhala cinema and theater actor
- Lionel Dubray (1923–1944), member of French Resistance during World War II
- Lionel Dunsterville (1865–1946), British general
- Lionel Dyck (1944–2024), Rhodesian-born mercenary
- Lionel Edirisinghe (1913–1988), Sri Lankan Sinhala musicologist
- Lionel Jr. "L. J." Figueroa Mercado (born 1998), Dominican-American basketball player
- Lionel Fleury (1912–1997), Canadian ice hockey administrator
- Lionel Gaunce (1915–1941), Canadian military aviator
- Lionel Grigson (1942–1994), British jazz musician and educator
- Lionel Victor Gunaratna (1893–1971), Sri Lankan Sinhala army officer, educationist, municipal councilor
- Lionel Hampton (1908–2002), American jazz musician, bandleader and actor
- Lionel Hollins (born 1953), American basketball player and coach
- Lionel James (1962–2022), American football player
- Lionel Jeffries (1926–2010), English actor, screenwriter and director
- Lionel Johnson (1867–1902), English poet
- Lionel Jospin (1937–2026), French politician and Prime Minister of France (1997–2002)
- Lionel Kouadio (born 2001), Ivorian basketballer
- Lionel Letizi (born 1973), French footballer
- Lionel Logue (1880–1953), Australian speech therapist and friend of King George VI
- Lionel Manuel (born 1962), American football player
- Lionel Mapoe (born 1988), South African rugby union footballer
- Lionel Martin (1878–1945), English businessman and co-founder of Aston Martin
- Lionel Messi (born 1987), Argentine footballer
- Lionel Morgan (footballer) (born 1983), English footballer
- Lionel Morgan (rugby league) (1938–2023), Australian rugby league footballer
- Lionel de Moustier (1817–1869), French diplomat and politician
- Lionel Newman (1916–1989), American film & television composer who worked for 20th Century Fox
- Lionel de Nicéville (1852–1901), English entomologist and curator
- Lionel Nshole Makondi (born 1995), Belgian footballer
- Lionel Penrose (1898–1972), British psychiatrist, medical geneticist, mathematician and chess theorist
- Lionel Power (c. 1370–1385–1445), English composer
- Lionel Price (1927–2019), British basketball player
- Lionel Ranwala (1939–2002), Sri Lankan folk musician
- Lionel Richie (born 1949), American singer, songwriter, musician, record producer and actor
- Lionel Rivera (born 1956), American politician
- Lionel Robbins, Baron Robbins (1898–1984), British economist and academic
- Lionel Rose (1948–2011), Australian boxer
- Lionel Rothschild (disambiguation), various people
- Lionel Royce (1891–1946), Austrian-American actor
- Lionel Royer-Perreaut (born 1972), French politician
- Lionel Sackville-West, 2nd Baron Sackville (1827–1908), British diplomat
- Lionel Scaloni (born 1978), Argentine football manager and former player
- Lionel Allen Sheldon (1828–1917), American politician and Governor of New Mexico Territory
- Lionel Shriver (born 1957), female American author
- Lionel Simmons (born 1968), American basketball player
- Lionel Stander (1908–1994), American actor
- Lionel Taylor (born 1935), American football player
- Lionel Taylor (footballer) (born 1984), Samoan footballer
- Lionel Tennyson, 3rd Baron Tennyson (1889–1951), English cricketer
- Lionel Tiger (born 1937), British anthropologist
- Lionel Tollemache (disambiguation), various earls and baronets
- Lionel Trilling (1905–1975), American literary critic
- Lionel Wendt (1900–1944), Sri Lankan pianist, photographer, literature collector, critic, and cinematographer
- Lionel Wigram (film producer), producer and screenplay writer
- Lionel Wigram (British Army officer), Second World War British soldier and tactics instructor
- Lionel Woodville (1446/1447–1484), Bishop of Salisbury

== Fictional characters ==
- Lionel, a Lion villager from the video game series Animal Crossing
- Sir Lionel, a knight of the Round Table in Arthurian legend
- Lionel Griff, Stanley's older brother in the Playhouse Disney animated television series Stanley
- Lionel Hutz, a recurring character in the television series The Simpsons
- Lionel Jefferson, a character in the American sitcom The Jeffersons
- Lionel Lockridge, a character in the American soap opera Santa Barbara
- Lionel Lion, a main character on the children's television show Between the Lions
- Lionel Shrike, a character in the Now You See Me film series
- Lionel Skeggins, a character in the New Zealand soap opera Shortland Street
- Lionel Verney, the narrator in Mary Shelley's novel The Last Man
