= Cranfield (disambiguation) =

Cranfield is a village in Bedfordshire, England. It may also refer to:

== Education ==
- Cranfield University, British postgraduate university
  - Cranfield School of Management, business school of Cranfield University

== Places ==
- Cranfield Airport, formerly RAF Cranfield, airfield outside Cranfield, England
- Cranfield Court, demolished country house in Cranfield, Bedfordshire, England
- Cranfield Icefalls, series of icefalls in Oates Land, Antarctica
- Cranfield Peak, peak in the Queen Elizabeth Range, Antarctica
- Cranfield Point, southernmost point of Northern Ireland

== People ==
- Arthur Cranfield (1892–1957), British newspaper editor
- Beaumont Cranfield (1872–1909), English cricketer
- Charles Cranfield (1915–2015), British theologian, academic, and minister
- Edward Cranfield (fl. 1680–1696), English colonial administrator
- Harry Cranfield (1917–1990), English footballer
- John Cranfield, Saint Helena politician
- Lionel Cranfield (disambiguation), multiple people
- Monty Cranfield (1909–1993), English cricketer

== Other ==
- Cranfield experiments, computer information retrieval experiments
- Cranfield United F.C., English football club
- Cranfield Vertigo, 1980s British human-powered helicopter
