= Sleeping with the Enemy (The Simpsons) =

- The Simpsons episode
- Episode no.: Season 16; Episode 3
- Directed by: Lauren MacMullan
- Written by: Jon Vitti
- Production code: FABF19
- Original air date: November 21, 2004

Guest appearance
- Marcia Wallace as Edna Krabappel

Episode features
- Couch gag: The Simpsons run in and find that the couch is missing. A few seconds later, the couch falls from the sky and crushes everyone.
- Commentary: Al Jean; Jon Vitti; Matt Selman; Tom Gammill; Max Pross; Mike Reiss; Lauren MacMullan; Mike B. Anderson

Episode chronology
← Previous "All's Fair in Oven War"	Next → "She Used to Be My Girl"
- The Simpsons season 16

"Sleeping with the Enemy" is the third episode of the sixteenth season of the American animated television series The Simpsons. It originally aired on the Fox network in the United States on November 21, 2004. To date, this is Jon Vitti's last episode as writer and Lauren MacMullan's last episode as director.

In the episode, Marge finds Nelson and acts as a mother figure towards him due to her belief that her children lost interest in her. Meanwhile, Lisa gets teased about her big butt, and becomes obsessed with her weight. The episode received mixed reviews.

== Plot ==
Lisa gets teased by Sherri and Terri about her big butt, making her embarrassed and self-conscious about her weight. Homer only makes matters worse when he tells her about the "Simpson butt", something that all Simpsons have. Bart brings home a geography test with a grade of 100, eagerly expecting a party that was promised to him if he had got a 100. Despite Homer discovering that the watermark of Bart's test is real and that all the answers are correct, he and Marge speak to Bart's teacher. Mrs. Krabappel confesses that she did not bother to fold up the map during the test, so Bart and everyone else received 100. Marge throws Bart a party, which is attended by Patty and Selma, Grampa, Grandma, Ralph, and Martin. Milhouse can only attend via speakerphone because he is sick with measles. Bart hates the party and to make matters worse, Lisa runs up to her room crying when Marge offers her one slice of cake.

Marge thinks her children no longer appreciate her, so when she finds Nelson catching tadpoles from a water fountain at the zoo, she decides to become a mother figure by spending quality time with him. They bond as Nelson tells Marge about his poor life involving his father abandoning him and never coming back. Marge brings him home so he can do some chores for money. Nelson's mother finds this out and does not want Marge giving them any charity. Later that night, Mrs. Muntz leaves town, and Nelson, having nowhere else to go, stays with the Simpsons. Marge lets him sleep in Bart's room, forcing Bart to sleep underneath his bed.

Late one night, Bart sees Nelson sing about his missing father, and sees Lisa eat an entire Labor Day cake as she was unable to take any more starvation. As Bart walks away, Nelson also sees her doing this and after talking about the situation, he offers to help Lisa get back at Sherri and Terri for teasing her. The next day, Nelson unleashes a skunk, which sprays both of them, while Lisa and her friends point and sing a parody of Jingle Bells. Both twins are scared and flee. When Lisa and Nelson return home, they find Nelson's father, who Bart found working at a freak show in a circus. It turns out that Mr. Muntz had really gone to the Kwik-E-Mart, where he had gotten a severe allergic reaction from eating a peanut bar. Coincidentally, the circus had made a stop in the Kwik-E-Mart parking lot, and the unscrupulous ringmaster noted the allergy and kept him as a forced freak for his traveling show. Nelson's mother finally returns, after going to Hollywood and getting the lead role in Macbeth, playing Lady Macbeth. Before returning to his family, Nelson thanks Marge for making him feel good about himself and appreciates what Bart did but says that this is not enough to stop him from bullying Bart.

As the family talk about the morals of the episode, Lisa admits that she still has body image issues. Homer tries to get Lisa to talk about it positively, but Lisa says that it is a "very open-ended problem" and that she may never fully be content with her body image. Homer tries to goad Lisa into changing her mind, but she refuses to do so.

== Production ==
The episode was written by Jon Vitti and was directed by Lauren MacMullan. This is their last episode to act as those roles.

== Reception ==
=== Viewing figures ===
In its original broadcast, "Sleeping with the Enemy" earned a 3.6 rating and was viewed by 9.95 million people, which was the 38th most-watched show that week.

=== Critical response ===
Colin Jacobson of DVD Movie Guide said the episode was "mediocre-at-best". He called Lisa's subplot "awfully preachy" and did not like Nelson's interactions with the Simpson family.

On Four Finger Discount, Guy Davis and Brendan Dando liked both the main plot and Lisa's subplot. They liked how the story added more dimension to Nelson's character.
