= Lionel Cranfield =

Lionel Cranfield may refer to:

- Lionel Cranfield, 1st Earl of Middlesex (1575–1645), English merchant and nobleman
- Lionel Cranfield, 3rd Earl of Middlesex (1625–1674), English nobleman
- Lionel Cranfield (cricketer) (1883–1968), Gloucestershire and Somerset cricketer
- Monty Cranfield, Lionel Montague Cranfield, (1909–1993), Gloucestershire cricketer and son of Lionel Cranfield (cricketer)
