= Lionel Cohen =

Lionel Cohen may refer to:

- Lionel Cohen, Baron Cohen (1888–1973), British judge
- Lionel I. Cohen (1914–2009), changed to Lionel Casson, American classicist
- Lionel Louis Cohen (1832–1887), English financier, politician, and communal worker
- Lionel Cowen (1846–1895), painter
