= Homer's Odyssey (The Simpsons) =

- The Simpsons episode
- Episode no.: Season 1 Episode 3
- Directed by: Wes Archer
- Written by: Jay Kogen; Wallace Wolodarsky
- Production code: 7G03
- Original air date: January 21, 1990

Guest appearances
- Sam McMurray as SNPP Employee and Duff Commercial VO; Marcia Wallace as Edna Krabappel

Episode features
- Chalkboard gag: "I will not skateboard in the halls"
- Couch gag: The family hurries on to the couch which makes it collapse.
- Commentary: Matt Groening; Wes Archer; Jay Kogen; Wallace Wolodarsky

Episode chronology
← Previous "Bart the Genius"	Next → "There's No Disgrace Like Home"
- The Simpsons season 1

"Homer's Odyssey" is the third episode of the American animated television series The Simpsons. It originally aired on Fox in the United States on January 21, 1990. In this episode, Homer becomes a crusader for safety in Springfield and is promoted to safety inspector at Springfield Nuclear Power Plant. The episode was written by Jay Kogen and Wallace Wolodarsky and was the first Simpsons script to be completed, although it was the third episode produced.

== Plot ==
Mrs. Krabappel takes Bart's class on a field trip to the Springfield Nuclear Power Plant. Distracted when Bart waves at him, Homer crashes an electric cart into a cooling vent and is fired. Homer searches for a new job without success. Feeling like a failure, he writes a note to his family and decides to commit suicide by tying a boulder to himself and jumping off a bridge.

Upon finding his suicide note, his family hurries to the bridge to save him, but they are almost run over by a speeding truck. Homer pulls them to safety just in time, and he is suddenly filled with a new reason to live: to place a stop sign at the dangerous intersection. After successfully petitioning the city council, Homer embarks on a public safety crusade that involves placing speed bumps and warning signs throughout the town.

Inspired to use his new safety efforts in order to not give up on finding a new job, Homer takes on the biggest danger in Springfield, the nuclear power plant. After Homer rallies people to his cause, Mr. Burns decides to end the furor he is creating by offering him a new position as the plant safety inspector, along with a higher salary. Homer, torn between his principles and his livelihood, tearfully tells his followers that they must fight their battles on their own from this point on, and takes the job who cheer for him.

== Cast ==
- Dan Castellaneta as Homer Simpson, Barney Gumble, Mr. Winfield and City Council #1
- Julie Kavner as Marge Simpson
- Nancy Cartwright as Bart Simpson, Lewis and Actor
- Yeardley Smith as Inanimate Carbon Rod #2 and Lisa Simpson
- Harry Shearer as Mr. Burns, Otto, Waylon Smithers, Smilin' Joe Fission, SNPP Supervisor, Loaftime Announcer, Jasper, City Council #2, City Council #1 (take 2) and Demonstrator
- Marcia Wallace as Edna Krabappel
- Hank Azaria as Moe Szyslak and Chief Wiggum
- Christopher Collins as City Council #3
- Pamela Hayden as Wendell
- Sam McMurray as SNPP Employee and Duff Commercial VO
- Russi Taylor as Sherri, Terri, Inanimate Carbon Rod #1 and Mrs. Winfield

== Production ==
"Black Smithers", as seen in this episode

Waylon Smithers makes his first appearance in this episode, although he can be heard over a speaker in the series premiere. In his first visual appearance, he was mistakenly animated with the wrong color and was made an African American by Györgyi Peluce, the color stylist. David Silverman has claimed that Smithers was always intended to be Mr. Burns's "white sycophant", and the staff thought it "would be a bad idea to have a black subservient character" and so switched him to his intended color for his next episode. Smithers's skin tone was later explained as an "extreme tan".

Blinky the Three-Eyed Fish makes a brief cameo in this episode; he later becomes of importance in episode four of the second season, "Two Cars in Every Garage and Three Eyes on Every Fish". Also notable is that Marge was originally called Juliette in this script as a homage to Romeo and Juliet. Homer's middle initial, J, is mentioned for the first time in this episode. According to Matt Groening, it was a reference to Bullwinkle J. Moose. Additionally, the following characters made their first appearances in this episode: Otto Mann, Chief Wiggum, Jasper Beardsley, Sam & Larry, Mr. & Mrs. Winfield and Sherri and Terri.

The episode's title comes from the Greek epic poem Odyssey, traditionally attributed to the legendary poet Homer. On the bus, Bart sings "John Henry was a Steel Driving Man", an American folk-song about a 19th-century hero of the working-class, building railroads across the West Virginia mountains.

== Reception ==
In its original broadcast, "Homer's Odyssey" finished twenty-eight in ratings for the week of January 15–21, 1990, with a Nielsen rating of 14.9, equivalent to approximately 13.7 million viewing households. It was the highest-rated show on the Fox network that week, beating Married... with Children.

Since airing, the episode has received mixed reviews from television critics. Gary Russell and Gareth Roberts, authors of the book I Can't Believe It's a Bigger and Better Updated Unofficial Simpsons Guide, said that "the story rather fizzles out at the end, but there are many good moments, especially in the power plant".

Colin Jacobson at DVD Movie Guide said in a review that the episode is "possibly the best of the [first six] shows" and that it "suffers a little from an odd tone, as the characters hadn't become settled. Still, it seems surprisingly clever and witty."

In September 2001, in a DVD review of the first season, David B. Grelck rated the episode 1 1/2 (of 5) and called it "the first season at its worst", continuing that it was "notable for introducing Mr. Burns and (a strangely African-American) Smithers, but otherwise boring and preachy".

== Home media ==
The episode was released first on home video in the United Kingdom, as part of a VHS release titled The Simpsons Collection, in which it was paired with the sixth episode of the season, "Moaning Lisa". In the United Kingdom, it was once re-released as part of a VHS boxed set of the complete first season, released in November 1999.

In the United States, the episode would finally see the home video release as a part of The Simpsons Season One DVD set, which was released on September 25, 2001. Groening, Archer, Kogen, and Wolodarsky participated in the DVD's audio commentary. A digital edition of the series' first season was published on December 20, 2010, in the United States containing the episode, through Amazon Video and iTunes.
