= Nelson Muntz =

Fictional character from The Simpsons franchise

- The Simpsons character
- First appearance: "Bart the General" (1990)
- Created by: Matt Groening
- Designed by: Matt Groening
- Voiced by: Nancy Cartwright

In-universe information
- Full name: Nelson Mandela Muntz
- Gender: Male
- Occupation: Student at Springfield Elementary School
- Family: Eddie Muntz (father); Marilyn Muntz (mother); Judge Muntz (grandfather)

Nelson Mandela Muntz is a fictional character, the lead school bully, and a recurring antagonist from the animated television series The Simpsons, where he is best known for his signature mocking laugh "Ha-ha!" He is voiced by Nancy Cartwright. Nelson was first introduced in Season 1's "Bart the General" as an antagonist, but later became more of an anti-hero, continuing to bully those weaker than him while occasionally showing a friendly and sensitive nature underneath. Nelson lives in poverty with his mother in a run-down home, and often shoplifts from convenience stores to get by.

== Role in The Simpsons ==
Nelson is a 10-year-old student and bully at Springfield Elementary School. He is known to have terrorized virtually every child in Springfield at one point or another. Most often, it is the school nerds and less popular students, such as Milhouse and Martin, who are the subjects of his cruelty. Nelson shows the occasional glimpse of humanity, and other characters have warmed to him because of that; Lisa dates him briefly in "Lisa's Date with Density", Marge informally adopts him in "Sleeping with the Enemy", and Bart is shown as a friend to him several times, such as in "The Haw-Hawed Couple".

His family is also financially poor resulting in a dysfunctional day-to-day lifestyle. While some early episodes offer inconsistent histories (such as Nelson's dad going insane and abandoning him, Nelson's parents divorcing because of his mom's cough drop addiction, or Nelson's dad in prison while his mom "has bigger problems"), the current canon story is that he lives in a dilapidated house with his mother, who works on the fringes of the sex industry, either as a waitress at Hooters or in a topless bar. The character design and voice portrayal of both parents have varied throughout the course of the series.

It is shown in many episodes that Nelson's father abandoned him and his mother at an early age when he "went to pick up some Pop-Tarts," although later on in the series he was said to have gone to pick up a pack of cigarettes. In the fourth-season episode "Brother from the Same Planet," Nelson's father is the children's soccer coach who awards Nelson with a free trip to Pele's Soccer and Acting Camp. Nelson's father also appears briefly in the sixth-season episode "Bart's Girlfriend," depicted capturing Nelson with a leash as the children run through the cornfields in an attempt to avoid attending church. He also appears in the ninth-season episode "Bart Star" to congratulate Nelson after a football game victory and take him to Hooters (with Nelson turning down the invitation because he "doesn't want to bother [his] Mom at work"). Nelson's father returns in the sixteenth-season episode "Sleeping with the Enemy". It turns out that he did not leave Nelson deliberately; he bit into a chocolate bar, not knowing it had peanuts, and had an allergic reaction, covering 90% of his body with large tumors. Confused and facially deformed, he ran out of the store and encountered a circus that made him a part of its freak show. Whenever there were performances, circus attendees threw peanuts at him, which perpetuated his reaction, preventing him from returning to normal. When the circus came through Springfield, Bart recognized him and brought him home to rid himself of Nelson (who had been taken into the Simpson home by Marge).

Nelson is also a natural athlete. In the episode "Bart Star", Nelson almost single-handedly carries the entire Springfield Pee-Wee football team. As the team quarterback, he also on one occasion catches his own pass and plows through the opposing team with extreme ease. In various episodes, he gives out the impression that he is a lot smarter than he may first appear. Nelson often points out painfully obvious things to adults and kids alike that take them longer to grasp. Another example is a running joke where Nelson does a class assignment that is implied to be of high quality. However, he is always brushed off by the teachers before he gets to show them his work. Another running joke, though, is Nelson presenting ridiculously simple assignments, such as repeatedly showing a can of tomato paste in Show and Tell, and a presentation on The Grapes of Wrath, consisting of himself crushing a bunch of grapes with a hammer, stating "Here's the grapes, and here's the wrath!" In later episodes, Nelson shows signs of being a tormented artist type, even submitting a film to the Sundance Film Festival about his life as a child living in poverty with a single, unfit mother and no strong father figure. He memorably says in the documentary, "I like to cry at the ocean, because only there do my tears seem small."

In the episode "Little Big Girl", it is revealed that Nelson is German-American. Ironically, in "Much Apu About Nothing", Nelson picks on foreign exchange student Üter for being German during Springfield's anti-immigration mania. He is shown to be a big fan of Andy Williams when he, Bart, Milhouse and Martin attend a Williams concert in "Bart on the Road".

In "The Simpsons Guy", he was captured along with Sideshow Bob, Principal Skinner, Jimbo Jones, and Apu by Stewie Griffin.

== Relationships with other characters ==
Even though in the first season (and for many seasons afterward) Nelson seemed to be Bart's antagonist, he eventually becomes what can be considered Bart's second closest friend after Milhouse.

In his debut episode, Lisa was the initial target of Nelson's friend. Nelson had two minions at first, one of whom snatched a box of cupcakes from Lisa, which prompted Bart to defend her. Bart's actions resulted in frequent beatings by Nelson and his gang, but finally ended when Bart received help from Herman, who came up with the idea of standing up to Nelson and his gang by pelting them with water balloons. From that point on, Nelson shows grudging respect for Bart, though he occasionally reverts to his past behaviour towards him.

Although still prone to violence, Nelson hangs out with Bart and his less popular friends, such as Milhouse Van Houten and occasionally even common bullying target Martin Prince. In "The Debarted", it is shown that Nelson has become Bart's "other best friend", along with Milhouse. Nelson is shown participating in many things with Bart further proving they're friends. Some of the activities they do consist of football, basketball, baseball, lacrosse, going to read comics, and playing pranks on people. They even competed on the same e-sports team and went to the world championship.

Nelson has many other moments where he displays his hidden good nature, such as his brief amorous relationship with Lisa. Although he cannot control his delinquent tendency, he treats her with respect and even tries to change for her, although both of them realize that he is not being true to himself by doing so. In "Lisa's Date with Density", Nelson kisses Lisa, only to be berated by Jimbo, Kearney, and Dolph, who believe that kissing girls is "gay" (despite the events that occurred revolving around Jimbo in "New Kid On The Block").

He also punishes Sherri and Terri for tormenting Lisa by having a skunk spray on them. Another curious example of his "good side" is with Martin, a boy whom Nelson picks on perhaps more so than any other kid in town. Despite the utter cruelty, there are occasional hints that Nelson does not harbor any real hatred towards Martin and only does so to maintain his 'tough guy' reputation. In "Dial 'N' for Nerder", when it is believed that Martin has died, Nelson endeavors to learn the truth and find Martin's killers. When it is revealed that Martin is alive, Nelson mocks and punches him, but also states that he is glad Martin is not dead. In this same episode, however, when Lisa tries to bribe him to not rat her out by offering to get back together with him, he rejects it. In another episode, it is revealed that both Martin and Nelson went to space camp and that Nelson was a loyal officer to Martin. (See "I'm Spelling as Fast as I Can")

In "Loan-a Lisa", Lisa uses $50 to help Nelson fund his bicycle company, which becomes a success. When Nelson almost drops out of school to spend more time on the company, Lisa is saddened and attempts to stop him from doing so, but eventually respects his decision after realizing he will not change despite the money used to fund it. Nelson eventually decides not to drop out after all and takes Lisa skating to make it up to her.

Though Nelson is often said to not really have friends aside from his on-and-off relationship with Bart and the others, Nelson sometimes hangs out with his fellow school bullies Jimbo, Dolph, Kearney, and (to a lesser extent) two smaller and younger fraternal twin minions known as the Weasels. Though only seen with them occasionally, Nelson is also ironically the leader of the school bullies (possibly by virtue of being the most often seen and most recognizable of the gang).

In "Sleeping with the Enemy", Moe Szyslak appears briefly during a Muntz family reunion. The facial similarities between Moe and the Muntzes are surprisingly quite apparent and Moe's childhood experiences and behaviour are somewhat relatable with Nelson's. Moe briefly appears and claims that he is part of the family and is then shunned off-screen by the Muntzes' confused looks.

== Character ==
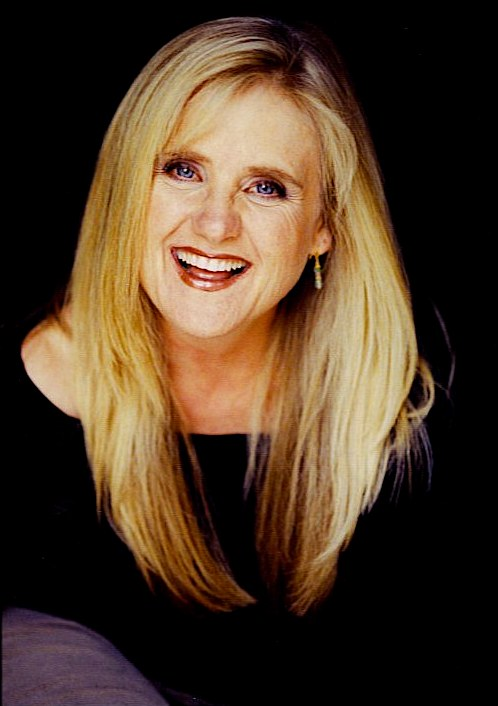
Nancy Cartwright voices Nelson, even though the role was not assigned to her originally.

The Simpsons creator Matt Groening named Nelson after the wrestling hold of the same name. Cast member Nancy Cartwright voices the character, who first appeared in the fifth episode of the first season, "Bart the General" (1990). American voice actress Dana Hill was first supposed to provide Nelson's voice and attended the read-through of the episode. However, as Cartwright wrote in her autobiography My Life as a 10-Year-Old Boy, "the producers were still putting together this ensemble of [actors] and, come Monday, at the recording, she was nowhere to be found and the part was assigned to me. I didn't have time to ask why and I still don't have a clue." Cartwright also commented that when she first found out she would be voicing Nelson, "I asked myself, 'What does a bully sound like?' Well... what you hear is what you get. When I first uttered, 'I'll get you after school, man!' I let out a sigh of relief when I got through the line and a double-sigh when it got a laugh."

By the eighth season of The Simpsons, the writers began to explore the secondary characters of the show. "Lisa's Date with Density" (season eight, 1996) was the first episode to center around Nelson and was used to explain why he acts the way he does. The idea of Nelson dating Lisa Simpson had already been around for a while, but this was the first time that the staff worked it into the show. Cartwright said in 2012 that she thinks Nelson "has evolved the most out of all the characters I do. There's a soft spot in him that the writers have found. He's got this special attraction to Marge, and he sings these songs, and he's got a crush on Lisa. There's something about this poor kid – his mother works at Hooters, his dad went out to buy cigarettes and never came back. I wouldn't want him to come over for dinner, but I really love doing his voice."

== Reception ==
The episode "The Haw-Hawed Couple" in 2007 was nominated for the Emmy Award for Outstanding Animated Program. The writer of the episode, Matt Selman, was nominated for a Writers Guild of America Award.

In his review of the season 22 episode "Loan-a Lisa", Rowan Kaiser of The A.V. Club commented that Nelson's character has undergone a "Spikeification", in reference to the bully's near-exclusive portrayal as being likable and vulnerable in later seasons of the program.
