= There's No Disgrace Like Home =

- The Simpsons episode
- Episode no.: Season 1 Episode 4
- Directed by: Gregg Vanzo; Kent Butterworth
- Written by: Al Jean; Mike Reiss
- Production code: 7G04
- Original air date: January 28, 1990

Episode features
- Chalkboard gag: "I will not burp in class"
- Couch gag: The family hurries on to the couch. Homer is squeezed off it and says, "D'oh!"
- Commentary: Matt Groening; Al Jean; Mike Reiss

Episode chronology
← Previous "Homer's Odyssey"	Next → "Bart the General"
- The Simpsons season 1

"There's No Disgrace Like Home" is the fourth episode of the American animated television series The Simpsons. It first aired on Fox in the United States on January 28, 1990. In the episode, Homer is ashamed of his family's behavior at a catastrophic company picnic and enrolls them in therapy. The therapist, Dr. Marvin Monroe (Harry Shearer), struggles to solve their problems − culminating in a shock therapy-based showdown between the family members − before eventually giving up and refunding their money.

One of the first-produced episodes of the season, it is known for showcasing early designs and different characterizations for several members of the cast. The episode is inspired by the comedy of Laurel and Hardy and features cultural references to films such as Citizen Kane and Freaks as well as the Batman and Twilight Zone television series. When the BBC began airing The Simpsons in November 1996, this episode was the first to be shown.

== Plot ==
Homer takes his family to a company picnic, where he is embarrassed by the behavior of Bart, Lisa, Maggie, and Marge. Mr. Burns, Homer's boss, fires any employee whose family members are not enjoying themselves. When Homer notices that Mr. Burns approves of a "normal", well-mannered family who treat one another with respect, he wonders why his own family is so dysfunctional. The picnic is a catastrophe when Bart chases and tortures the swans, Lisa swims in the fountain, and Marge gets drunk from alcohol-spiked punch and performs a musical number.

Homer tries to prove his point to Bart, Lisa, and Marge by taking them on a tour of the neighborhood and peeking in windows to observe other families. The excursion makes the others uncomfortable for invading these families' privacy, and one homeowner shoots at them for trespassing. A depressed Homer visits Moe's Tavern, where he sees a television advertisement for Dr. Marvin Monroe's Family Therapy Center. Enticed by Monroe's guarantee of "family bliss or double your money back", Homer decides to sign the Simpsons up for an appointment.

To his family's chagrin, Homer pawns their television to pay for the $250 therapy. When Monroe asks the Simpsons to draw pictures of the source of their problems, Bart, Lisa, and Marge draw Homer. Distracted, Homer draws an airplane in flight and Monroe scolds him for being a bad father figure. After Homer gets angry with Bart and tries to attack him with a lamp, Monroe gives the Simpsons padded mallets to work out their aggression without harming each other. The exercise fails when Bart removes the padding from his mallet and hits Monroe in the knee with the hard inner core.

In frustration, Monroe resorts to aversion therapy by wiring the family members to an electric generator, so they can deliver shocks to one another to deter misbehavior. However, they shock each other so many times that the generator becomes damaged, scaring Monroe's other patients into fleeing the office, and the entire city suffers a brownout to Burns's delight. Realizing he cannot help the Simpsons, Monroe unplugs the generator and begs them to leave. After Homer reminds him of the double-money-back guarantee, Monroe angrily pays him $500 on the condition that they never tell anyone of their visit to the center. The Simpsons decide to buy a new television with the money.

== Cast ==
- Dan Castellaneta as Homer Simpson, Barney Gumble and Son in Monroe ad
- Julie Kavner as Marge Simpson
- Nancy Cartwright as Bart Simpson, Tom Gammil, Mother #2 and Receptionist
- Yeardley Smith as Lisa Simpson
- Harry Shearer as Mr. Burns, Waylon Smithers, Father #1, Documentation voice, Father #2, Boxing announcer, Eddie, Dr. Marvin Monroe, Voice in Monroe ad, Pawnbroker and Father #3
- Hank Azaria as Moe Szyslak, Mr. Gammil, Lou and Father in Monroe ad
- Maggie Roswell as Mother #1, Daughter and Mother in Monroe ad
- Pamela Hayden as Son #1 and Son #2

== Production ==
The episode shows signs of being one of the earliest produced. Several of the characters notably behave differently compared to the episodes surrounding it: akin to her portrayal in the Tracey Ullman Show shorts, Lisa is an undisciplined brat indistinguishable from Bart, Marge gets drunk and is inattentive, and Homer is the voice of reason. These roles were reversed in later episodes. It was an early episode for Mr. Burns, who was known as Mr. Meanie in the first draft. Originally, the character was influenced by Ronald Reagan, a concept that was later dropped. The idea that he would greet his employees using index cards was inspired by the way Reagan greeted people. The episode marks the first time Burns refers to "releasing the hounds".

The episode marked the first appearance of Dr. Marvin Monroe and Itchy & Scratchy; the latter had previously appeared in the shorts. It also marked the first appearance of yellow Smithers, who was drawn as an African-American in the previous episode. Eddie and Lou also appeared for the first time, although Lou was mistakenly animated with yellow instead of black, as he would later become. Lou was named after Lou Whitaker, a Major League Baseball player.

The idea behind the shock therapy scene was based on Laurel and Hardy throwing pies at each other. The scene was rearranged in the editing room; it played out differently when first produced. The edits to this scene were preliminary, but well-received, and remained unchanged in the finished product.

The episode's title is a parody of the phrase "There's no place like home," first heard in the 1823 song "Home! Sweet Home!," and best recognized from the 1939 film The Wizard of Oz. The scene in which the family enters Burns's Manor contains two cultural references. The Manor resembles Charles Foster Kane's mansion from the 1941 film Citizen Kane. The characters refer to it as "stately Burns Manor", a reference to the Batman TV series. In addition, there is a reference to Freaks, the Tod Browning cult horror film, in the repetition of the line "one of us".

While drunk at Mr. Burns's picnic, Marge sings a version of the song "Hey, Brother, Pour the Wine" which was popularised by Dean Martin. The shock therapy scene is reminiscent of the 1971 film A Clockwork Orange.

The episode made a brief appearance as inflight entertainment in the 1990 action film Die Hard 2.

== Reception ==
In its original broadcast, "There's No Disgrace Like Home" (which aired the same day as Super Bowl XXIV on rival network CBS) finished forty-fifth in ratings for the week of January 22–28, 1990, with a Nielsen rating of 11.2, equivalent to approximately 10.3 million viewing households. It was the second-highest-rated show on Fox that week, following Married... with Children.

Since airing, the episode has received mixed reviews from television critics. The authors of the book I Can't Believe It's a Bigger and Better Updated Unofficial Simpsons Guide, Gary Russell and Gareth Roberts, note: "It's very strange to see Homer pawning the TV set in an attempt to save the family; if this episode had come later Marge would surely have taken this stance." They continue, "A neat swipe at family counseling with some great set pieces; we're especially fond of the perfect version of The Simpsons and the electric-shock aversion therapy."

Colin Jacobson at DVD Movie Guide said in a review that the episode is "[his] least favorite episode of Season One" and further commented: "Homer feels embarrassed by the others? Marge acts poorly in public and doesn't care about the upkeep of the family? Lisa (Yeardley Smith) engages in pranks and silliness? This ain't the family we've grown to know and love."

It was the first episode to be broadcast on terrestrial television by the BBC on November 23, 1996, on a Saturday at 5:30 pm, because the episodes were shown out of order. The episode was screened with five million viewers, slightly less than the show Dad's Army, which previously held the timeslot. The episode also faced competition from ITV's screening of Sabrina the Teenage Witch.

== Home media ==
The episode was released first on home video in the United Kingdom, as part of a VHS release titled The Simpsons Collection; the episode was paired with season one episode "Bart the General". It was released in the US on the VHS release The Best of The Simpsons, Vol. 1 (1997), paired with "Life on the Fast Lane". It was later re-released in the US in a collector's edition boxed set of the first three volumes of The Best of The Simpsons collections. It was re-released in the UK as part of a VHS boxed set of the complete first season, released in November 1999. The episode's debut on the DVD format was as a part of The Simpsons season one DVD set, which was released on September 25, 2001. Groening, Jean, and Reiss participated in the DVD's audio commentary. A digital edition of the series' first season was published December 20, 2010 in the United States containing the episode, through Amazon Video and iTunes.
