= Bart the General =

- The Simpsons episode
- Episode no.: Season 1 Episode 5
- Directed by: David Silverman
- Written by: John Swartzwelder
- Production code: 7G05
- Original air date: February 4, 1990

Episode features
- Commentary: Matt Groening; James L. Brooks; David Silverman

Episode chronology
← Previous "There's No Disgrace Like Home"	Next → "Moaning Lisa"
- The Simpsons season 1

"Bart the General" is the fifth episode of the American animated television series The Simpsons. It originally aired on Fox in the United States on February 4, 1990. In the episode, Bart Simpson enlists Grampa's help to battle local bully Nelson Muntz. Bart unites the neighborhood children against Nelson and defeats him. The episode was directed by David Silverman and was the first to be written by John Swartzwelder.

== Plot ==
Bart gets into a fight with Nelson Muntz, the school bully, after Nelson's friends stomp on a box of cupcakes that Lisa baked for Miss Hoover's birthday party. Nelson beats up Bart after school and warns him to expect the same pummeling the next day. Marge encourages Bart to reason with Nelson, but Homer urges him to bend the rules and fight dirty. Bart follows Homer's advice but gets beaten up again. He turns to the toughest member of the Simpson family, Grampa, who introduces him to Herman, the crazed one-armed proprietor of an army surplus store called Herman's Military Antiques. After Herman teaches him military tactics, Bart declares war on Nelson and his gang of bullies.

Bart enlists all of Nelson's other victims — nearly all of his friends and classmates — and trains them for combat. With Herman commanding from Bart's tree house, Bart leads his forces into battle by ambushing Nelson and his minions. They commence saturation bombing with water balloons, forcing Nelson's thugs to surrender and Nelson to be taken prisoner, who threatens to beat up Bart as soon as he is untied. Herman drafts an armistice that states that Nelson will retain his honorary position and name but not hold any actual power. After Bart and Nelson sign the treaty, Marge serves cupcakes and peace prevails.

During the epilogue, Bart tells the audience that contrary to the events of the episode, war is neither glamorous nor fun, and states that there are no winners and very few good wars. He also advises that the audience visit their local library for more information about war then wishes the audience a goodnight.

== Cast ==
- Dan Castellaneta as Homer Simpson and Grampa Simpson
- Julie Kavner as Marge Simpson and Receptionist
- Nancy Cartwright as Bart Simpson, Nelson Muntz and Lewis
- Yeardley Smith as Lisa Simpson
- Harry Shearer as Otto, Principal Seymour Skinner, Jasper and Herman
- Susan Blu as Weasel #1
- Jo Ann Harris as Weasel #2, Richard and Lewis
- Pamela Hayden as Milhouse Van Houten and Boy

== Production ==
Harry Shearer based the voice of Herman, a character introduced in this episode, on that of George H. W. Bush.

This episode was running too long to use the normal opening sequence and therefore did not feature a chalkboard gag or a couch gag. Instead, it just cut to an image of the Simpson house. David Silverman was the director and was somewhat stressed, because he was doing storyboards for this episode while also directing "Bart the Genius". Originally, he had planned to use the song "War" by Edwin Starr in the episode. The plans were dropped when they decided the song did not really fit the story. John Swartzwelder wrote the episode, his first on the show. The episode had problems with the censors, who did not want the characters to say "family jewels" on prime time television. The producers ignored the notes and "family jewels" remained in the episode. This act of attempted censorship was reflected in the part where Grampa Simpson writes a letter complaining of how sexualized television has become and gives a list of words he never wants to hear on television again, one of which is the phrase "family jewels".

Two new characters were introduced in this episode. The first, Nelson Muntz, remains a frequently used recurring character. Voice actress Dana Hill was originally assigned to play Nelson and was present at the table read, but not at the recording session (for unknown reasons). Nancy Cartwright was then assigned the role. The second character, Herman, has been used far less. The design of Herman, with the exception of his missing arm, was inspired by writer John Swartzwelder. His voice, as performed by Harry Shearer, was partly inspired by George H. W. Bush. The original idea for Herman was for him to have a differing story for the loss of his arm with every appearance.

== Cultural references ==
The episode featured several references to war films. Several lines of dialogue, Bart slapping one of his soldiers for "being a disgrace", and the music was lifted directly from the 1970 film Patton, composed by Jerry Goldsmith. Fox owned the rights to this film, so it was no problem to use the soundtrack. The marching sequence and the silhouettes of the children climbing the jungle gym against the setting sun are a nod to Stanley Kubrick's 1987 film Full Metal Jacket. The Longest Day from 1962 is also referenced. The episode parodies the famous sailor kissing a girl in Times Square photograph taken on V-J Day, where a random boy in a sailor suit kisses Lisa, before she slaps him in the face. Bart concludes the episode by saying the only "good wars" are the American Revolution, World War II, and the Star Wars trilogy.

== Reception ==
In its original American broadcast, "Bart the General" finished 31st place in the weekly ratings for the week of January 29 – February 4, 1990 with a Nielsen rating of 14.3. It was the highest-rated show on Fox that week.

Since airing, the episode has received mostly positive reviews from television critics. The authors of the book I Can't Believe It's a Bigger and Better Updated Unofficial Simpsons Guide, Gary Russell and Gareth Roberts, said: "Some good lines and setpieces aside – we love Bart's fantasy of death at Nelson's hands – this episode nevertheless feels a bit unsure of itself, particularly towards the end." In a DVD review of the first season, David B. Grelck rated the episode a 3 (of 5) and called it "another episode that helped to propel Bart's popularity into the stratosphere ..."

Colin Jacobson at DVD Movie Guide said in a review that the episode "remains a primitive example of The Simpsons, but it's a reasonably amusing and entertaining experience", adding that the episode "lacks the subtlety and cleverness found on later episodes, but it was onto something". Matt Groening notes on the commentary track that he finds it strange how controversial this episode seemed at the time of its release. Today, they would go a lot further and to him this episode now seems harmless. The episode's reference to Full Metal Jacket was named the eleventh greatest film reference in the history of the show by Nathan Ditum of Total Film.

=== Use in scientific research ===
"Bart the General" and Seinfeld's "The Tape" were used in a Dartmouth College experiment to study brain activity in relation to humorous moments in television shows. The results were published in a 2004 issue of the academic journal Neurolmage. The researchers noted, "During moments of humor detection, significant [brain] activation was noted in the left posterior middle temporal gyrus ... and left inferior frontal gyrus."

== Home media ==
The episode was released first on home video in the United Kingdom, as part of a VHS release titled The Simpsons Collection; the episode was paired with season one episode "There's No Disgrace Like Home". It was released in the US on the VHS release The Best of The Simpsons, Vol. 2 (1997), paired with "Moaning Lisa". It was later re-released in the US in a collector's edition boxed set of the first three volumes of The Best of The Simpsons collections. It was re-released in the UK as part of a VHS boxed set of the complete first season, in November 1999. The episode's debut on the DVD format was as a part of The Simpsons season one DVD set, which was released on September 25, 2001. Groening, Brooks, and Silverman participated in the DVD's audio commentary. A digital edition of the series' first season, including the episode, was published December 20, 2010 in the United States through Amazon Video and iTunes.
