= Bart Gets Hit by a Car =

- The Simpsons episode
- Episode no.: Season 2 Episode 10
- Directed by: Mark Kirkland
- Written by: John Swartzwelder
- Production code: 7F10
- Original air date: January 10, 1991

Guest appearances
- Phil Hartman as Lionel Hutz, the Heavenly voice, and Larry Dalrymple

Episode features
- Chalkboard gag: "I will not sell school property"
- Couch gag: Homer bumps everybody off the couch.
- Commentary: Matt Groening; Mike Reiss; Mark Kirkland

Episode chronology
← Previous "Itchy & Scratchy & Marge"	Next → "One Fish, Two Fish, Blowfish, Blue Fish"
- The Simpsons season 2

"Bart Gets Hit by a Car" is the tenth episode of the second season of the American animated television series The Simpsons. It originally aired on Fox in the United States on January 10, 1991. In the episode, Bart is hit by Mr. Burns' car. Prompted by ambulance-chasing lawyer Lionel Hutz and quack doctor Nick Riviera, the Simpsons sue Burns, seeking extensive damages for Bart's injuries. Hutz and Dr. Nick exaggerate Bart's injuries to earn the jury's sympathy at the trial. Marge wants Homer to accept Burns' proposed settlement instead of asking Bart to lie on the witness stand.

"Bart Gets Hit by a Car" was written by John Swartzwelder and directed by Mark Kirkland. The episode's plot was based on Billy Wilder's 1966 film The Fortune Cookie. Much of the ending of the show was pitched by executive producer James L. Brooks, who felt the episode needed a more emotional ending. The episode includes the debuts of three recurring characters, Lionel Hutz, Dr. Nick and the Blue-Haired Lawyer. The Devil also appears on the show for the first time. Recurring guest star Phil Hartman makes his first appearance as Hutz. The show's then-script supervisor Doris Grau also voices a character in the show for the first time.

In its original broadcast, "Bart Gets Hit by a Car" received a Nielsen rating of 14.5, finishing the week ranked 32nd. The episode received generally positive reviews.

== Plot ==
While crossing the road on his skateboard, Bart is struck by Mr. Burns' car and hospitalized. When Bart wakes up, the attorney Lionel Hutz suggests that the Simpsons sue Mr. Burns. Marge disagrees since according to Dr. Hibbert, the family's physician, Bart's injuries are minor. After Mr. Burns offers Homer a measly $100, which he immediately rescinds when Homer mentions it would not even cover Bart's medical bills, accusing him of extortion, Homer visits Hutz's law office at Springfield Mall.

Hutz promises Homer a cash settlement of $1 million if Bart lies about the extent of his injuries, of which Hutz gets half as his fee. Hutz takes Bart to go see Dr. Nick, a quack doctor who claims Bart has extensive injuries and wraps him in bandages. On the stand, Bart and Mr. Burns both tell exaggerated versions of the accident to impress the jury, who find Bart's story to be more believable, but Marge and Lisa are furious because they know it is Hutz's attempt to curry their favor.

An angry Mr. Burns offers Marge and Homer an out of court $500,000 settlement. When Mr. Burns leaves the room to let Homer discuss the offer with Marge, she pleads with Homer to accept the money and drop the lawsuit. Homer refuses, knowing Mr. Burns will lose and have to pay the full $1 million. Angered, Marge admits that she and Lisa are concerned over his recent behavior and the "shifty lawyers" and "phony doctors" he hired. Having eavesdropped on the conversation, Mr. Burns quickly returns and withdraws his offer.

At the trial, Marge is called to the stand and, due to being under oath, reluctantly denounces Dr. Nick as a quack with no medical qualifications that Hutz hired to discredit Dr. Hibbert. When Mr. Burns's lawyer asks about the extent of Bart's injuries, she outlines Dr. Hibbert's original prognosis of how limited his injuries really are, and how Homer and Hutz made Bart lie in his testimony. Her honest testimony destroys Hutz's case, and the Simpsons get nothing.

That night, Homer goes to Moe's Tavern to drown his sorrows. Marge follows him and asks to forgive her for testifying truthfully. Homer looks into her eyes and realizes he loves her as much as ever.

== Production ==
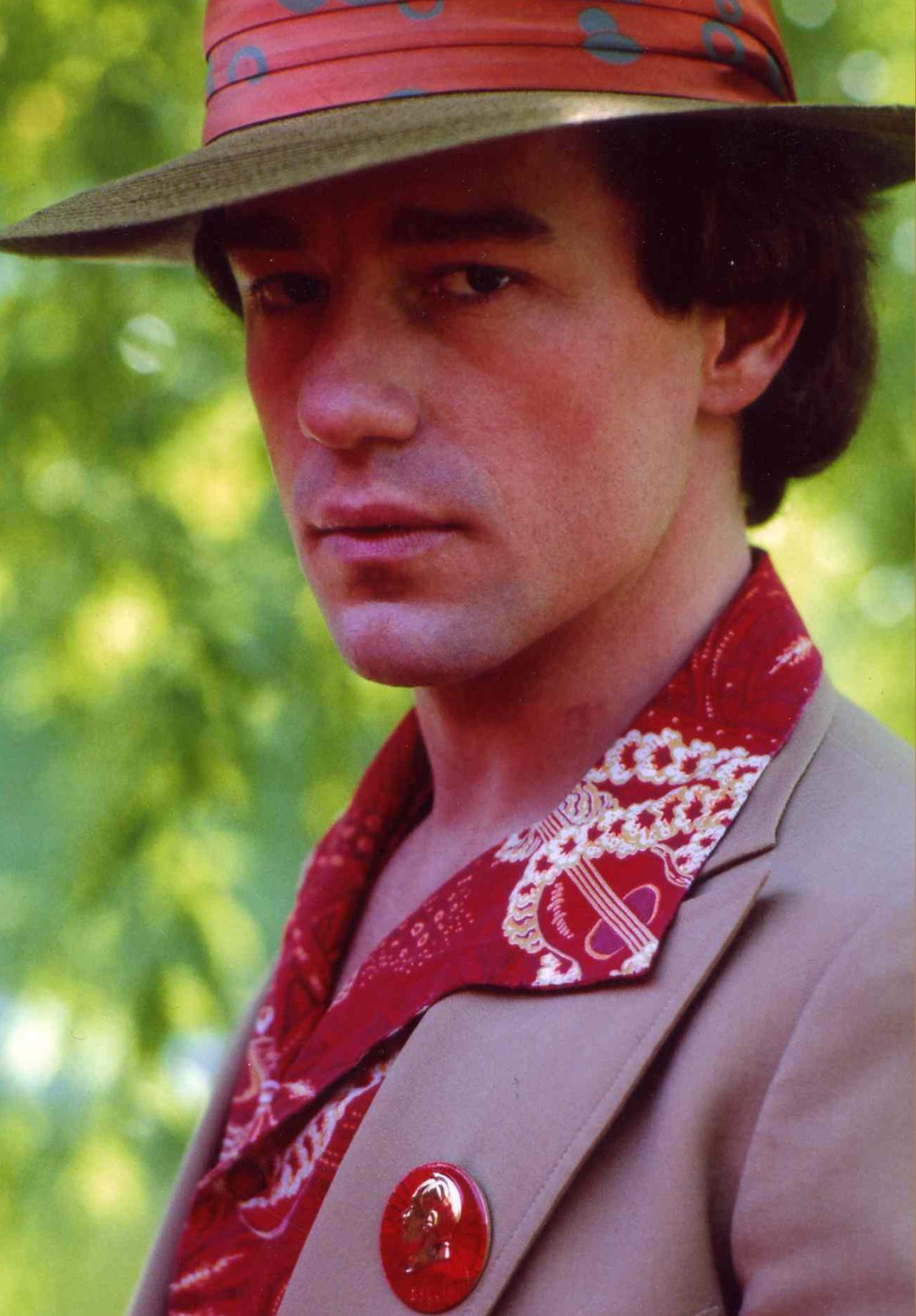
This was the first episode to guest star Phil Hartman, who voiced Lionel Hutz

The episode's plot was based on Billy Wilder's 1966 film The Fortune Cookie, in which Walter Matthau plays a dishonest lawyer who convinces Jack Lemmon's character to fake an injury for a large cash settlement. While working on the court room scenes, director Mark Kirkland watched To Kill a Mockingbird and The Verdict to get ideas for different angles he could use. Although the episode was written by John Swartzwelder, a lot of the ending was pitched by executive producer James L. Brooks. Brooks felt that the episode needed a more emotional ending, so some shots were reworked so voice-overs could be added.

The episode includes the debuts of three recurring characters, Lionel Hutz, Dr. Nick Riviera and the Blue-Haired Lawyer. Lionel Hutz was designed by Mark Kirkland, who gave him an evil design, but was asked to make him more "bland looking". He gave him a powder blue suit to make him stand out more. Phil Hartman, who voiced Hutz, also guest stars for the first time. He would later become one of the most frequently appearing guest stars, with Hutz and Troy McClure (who was introduced later in the second season) being his most well-known characters.

Dr. Nick Riviera is voiced by Hank Azaria, who used a "bad Ricky Ricardo" impression. The animators modeled Dr. Nick after then-supervising director Gábor Csupó, because they mistakenly believed that Azaria was impersonating him. The Blue-Haired Lawyer, who does not have a proper name, was based on Roy Cohn, who became famous as Senator Joseph McCarthy's lawyer. His voice, provided by Dan Castellaneta, was also an impression of Cohn. The Devil is also shown for the first time, and he was designed by Mark Kirkland, who originally tried to give him a scary design, but the writers asked him to use a more comedic look.

The show's then-script supervisor Doris Grau also appears in the show for the first time. She was used because of her unique voice, and appears as a minor character in this episode, but would later become known for voicing Lunchlady Doris.

This is one of five episodes to feature the title on screen (season one's "The Telltale Head" among others).

== Cultural references ==
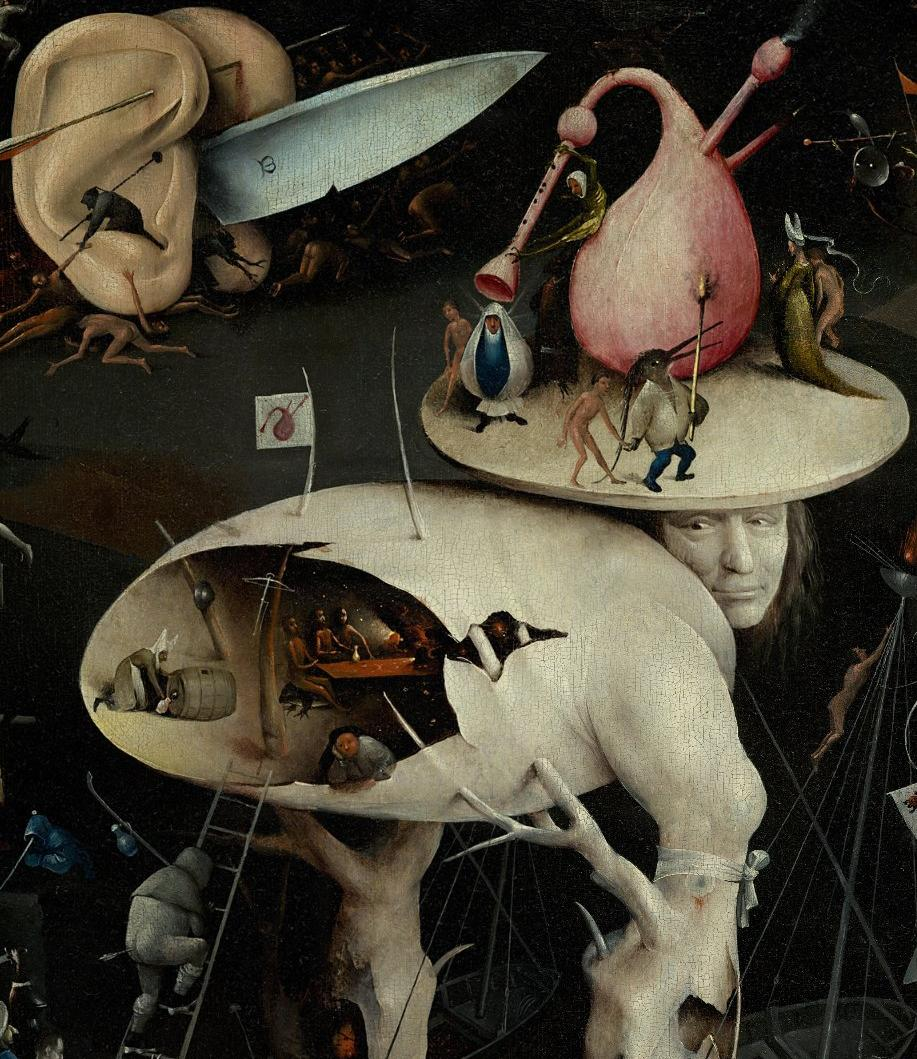
The brief shot of hell in the episode was inspired by the hell panel (detail picture) of Hieronymus Bosch's triptych The Garden of Earthly Delights.

The Devil says "Please allow me to introduce myself", a reference to The Rolling Stones song "Sympathy for the Devil". When Bart wakes up from his out-of-body experience, he says, "I did go away, Mom! I was miles and miles and miles away, writhing in agony in the pits of Hell! And you were there! And you and you and you," a reference to the 1939 film adaptation of The Wizard of Oz, when Dorothy awakens from her slumber. The design of Hell in the episode references Hieronymus Bosch's triptych The Garden of Earthly Delights, particularly the Hell panel.

== Reception ==
In its original broadcast, "Bart Gets Hit by a Car" finished 32nd in ratings for the week of January 7–13, 1991, with a Nielsen rating of 14.5 and was viewed in approximately 13.5 million homes, down from show's season average rank of 28th. It was the highest rated program on Fox that week. The episode finished second in its timeslot to The Cosby Show, which aired at the same time on NBC, which had a Nielsen rating of 17.8.

The episode's reference to The Wizard Of Oz was named the fourth greatest film reference in the history of the show by Nathan Ditum of Total Film. The authors of the book I Can't Believe It's a Bigger and Better Updated Unofficial Simpsons Guide, Gary Russell and Gareth Roberts, praised "Bart Gets Hit by a Car" as "an interesting episode in that we begin to see the very dark side of Burns that will develop later, although Smithers is still just a toady. A good introduction for Lionel Hutz and a nice look at Hell, Heaven and the original Snowball".

Doug Pratt, a DVD reviewer and Rolling Stone contributor, concurred, stating that the episode led to "inspired looks at Heaven, Hell, and ambulance-chasing lawyers". DVD Movie Guide's Colin Jacobson lauded the episode for "provid[ing] a lot of great moments, especially in court when we heard the differing viewpoints of the accident offered by Bart and Mr. Burns. 'Car' worked well and was consistently amusing and lively." Dawn Taylor of The DVD Journal thought the best line was Bart's testimony: "It was a beautiful Sunday afternoon. I was playing in my wholesome childlike way, little realizing that I was about to be struck down by the Luxury Car of Death."
