= Lionel Cranfield (cricketer) =

English cricketer

Personal information
- Full name: Lionel Lord Cranfield
- Born: 11 October 1883; Brixton, London, England
- Died: 17 May 1968 (aged 84); Sale, Cheshire, England
- Batting: Right-handed
- Bowling: Left-arm orthodox spin
- Role: Bowler
- Relatives: Brother Beaumont, son Monty

Domestic team information
- Years: Team
- 1903–22: Gloucestershire
- 1906: Somerset
- First-class debut: 15 June 1903 Gloucestershire v Gentlemen of Philadelphia
- Last First-class: 20 July 1922 Gloucestershire v Derbyshire

Career statistics
Competition	First-class
Matches	29
Runs scored	612
Batting average	13.30
100s/50s	–/1
Top score	51*
Balls bowled	3753
Wickets	59
Bowling average	29.83
5 wickets in innings	2
10 wickets in match	–
Best bowling	6/67
Catches/stumpings	15/–
- Source: CricketArchive, 12 June 2010

Lionel Lord Cranfield (11 October 1883 – 17 May 1968) played first-class cricket for Gloucestershire and Somerset between 1903 and 1922. He was born in Brixton, London and died at Sale, Cheshire.

Cranfield was a right-handed lower-order batsman and a left-arm orthodox spin bowler. He had a very spasmodic career in first-class cricket, playing four games for Gloucestershire in 1903, four for Somerset in 1906, and then two more for Gloucestershire in 1910. In 1913 and 1914 he appeared in seven and eight games respectively, and there were then four appearances in three different seasons after the First World War; all of these later matches were for Gloucestershire. As late as the early 1930s he was playing Lancashire League cricket for Enfield.

Cranfield's best bowling figures were achieved in the first innings of his first first-class match: six for 67 against the Gentlemen of Philadelphia at Cheltenham in 1903. He passed 50 only once in a first-class innings, making an undefeated 51 against Kent at Gloucester in 1914; he also made 46 in the second innings of this match.

His brother, Beaumont Cranfield, played for Somerset between 1897 and 1908 and Lionel's son, Monty Cranfield, played for Gloucestershire from 1934 to 1951.

== League cricket ==
The cricket writer John Kay, in his anecdotal history of Lancashire League cricket, Cricket in the Leagues, wrote a whole chapter on Lionel Cranfield as "The Man who Inspired". Cranfield, he wrote, had set up a florist shop in Middleton and joined Middleton Cricket Club as its professional "for less money than he could have obtained elsewhere in league cricket because of the challenge the job offered and the prospect that his engagement might be good for (the) florist business". He had earlier played for clubs in the Bolton League, the Central Lancashire League and the Lancashire League. Kay records that Cranfield was an inspirational cricket coach and that, when his League cricket playing career was over, he became assistant coach at Eton College, working alongside George Hirst, before retiring from that back to Middleton.
