= Lionel Rothschild =

Lionel Rothschild may refer to:

- Lionel de Rothschild (1808–1879), the son of Nathan Mayer Rothschild
- Lionel de Rothschild (born 1882) (1882–1942), the eldest son of Leopold de Rothschild
- Lionel Walter Rothschild, 2nd Baron Rothschild (1868–1937), the eldest son of Nathan Rothschild, 1st Baron Rothschild
