= John Cranfield =

Saint Helena politician

John Cranfield is a Saint Helena politician. Cranfield and his wife, Vilma Cranfield, were invited as the official representatives of Saint Helena, Ascension and Tristan da Cunha to the Wedding of Prince William of Wales and Kate Middleton in 2011. He is a former Justice of the Peace, and is currently the Deputy Speaker of the Legislative Council of Saint Helena.
