= Monty Cranfield =

Personal information
- Full name: Lionel Montague Cranfield
- Born: 29 August 1909; Bristol, England
- Died: 18 November 1993 (aged 84); Stockport, Cheshire, England
- Batting: Right-handed
- Bowling: Right-arm leg break/off break
- Role: All-rounder
- Relatives: Father Lionel, uncle Beaumont

Domestic team information
- Years: Team
- 1934–51: Gloucestershire
- First-class debut: 2 May 1934 Gloucestershire v Oxford University
- Last First-class: 15 May 1951 Gloucestershire v Somerset

Career statistics
Competition	First-class
Matches	162
Runs scored	2466
Batting average	14.25
100s/50s	–/4
Top score	90
Balls bowled	15518
Wickets	233
Bowling average	32.92
5 wickets in innings	8
10 wickets in match	2
Best bowling	8/45
Catches/stumpings	38/–
- Source: CricketArchive, 16 June 2010

Lionel Montague Cranfield (29 August 1909 – 18 November 1993) played first-class cricket for Gloucestershire between 1934 and 1951. He was born in Bristol and died at Stockport, Greater Manchester.

== Family ==
Monty Cranfield was the son of Lionel Cranfield, who played first-class cricket for Gloucestershire and Somerset between 1903 and 1922, and the nephew of Beaumont Cranfield, who played for Somerset from 1897 to 1908 and who died just months before Monty was born.

== Cricket career ==
Monty Cranfield was a right-arm leg break and off break bowler and a right-handed lower-order batsman who played fairly regularly for Gloucestershire both before and after the Second World War without ever really being certain of his place in the team. As a spin bowler, he coincided for much of his career with off-spinner Tom Goddard and then later with the slow left-arm spin bowler Sam Cook, both Test players and inevitable first-choice bowlers. As a result, he never achieved 50 wickets in a single English season, and nor did he ever bowl as many as 500 overs in a single season. As a batsman, though he often made useful runs, he had only one season, when he was 37 years old, when he was anywhere close to a front-line batsman.

== Pre-war cricket ==
Cranfield first appeared for Gloucestershire in 1934 and played in 17 first-class matches that season, making 305 runs at an average of 16.05 and taking 23 wickets at an average of 37.60. His first five-wicket haul came at Bristol against a Yorkshire team weakened by Test calls; he took five for 58 in the first innings, but scarcely bowled in the second innings as Reg Sinfield and Charles Parker shared the wickets between them. In 1935, Cranfield was awarded his county cap, though his season's figures were poor: 294 runs at an average of just 8.16 and only 10 wickets all season. He did, however, produce his first 50 in first-class cricket: an innings of exactly 50 against Derbyshire at Bristol. The batting got no better across the 1930s, and though Wisden noted in its review of Gloucestershire's 1936 season that "[Cranfield's] slow leg-breaks were often useful", the 35 wickets he took in that season were his best return in pre-war cricket. By 1939, he was playing mostly for Gloucestershire's second team in the Minor Counties, though he returned for the game against Cambridge University in June 1939 and took 10 wickets in the match for 88 runs, including a first-innings return of five for 33 which was at that stage his best in first-class cricket. Wisden's report that Cranfield was "flighting and spinning the ball from the off" suggests that he was bowling off spin at this stage.

== Postwar cricket ==
When first-class cricket resumed after the Second World War in the 1946 season, Sinfield had retired and Goddard was 45 years old. But though that gave Cranfield a more reliable place in the Gloucestershire side, he did not do much more bowling than before, as Sam Cook emerged as a slow left-arm spin bowler to partner Goddard. In the match against Cambridge University at Gloucester, however, Cranfield took the bowling honours, with eight for 45 from his off breaks in the first Cambridge innings and five for 9 as the university was dismissed for just 34 in the second innings; Cranfield's match figures were 13 wickets for 54 runs and both the first innings and the match figures were the best of his career. The other seven Cambridge wickets in the match were taken by Cook at a cost of 54 runs also. Those 13 wickets took him to a season total of 47 wickets at the for-him low average of 20.44.

The 1947 season, when Gloucestershire chased Middlesex hard for the County Championship, was Cranfield best as a batsman by some distance: he made three scores of more than 50 to add to his solitary effort in 1935. Against Cambridge University, he made 67 and helped Jack Crapp put on 172 for the eighth wicket. He made 59 against Sussex. And then in the last game of the season, against Essex at Bristol, he scored 90, the top score of a high-scoring match. In the season as whole, Cranfield scored 660 runs at an average of 26.48, though in a season in which Goddard took more than 200 wickets, he took only 29 and bowled only just over 300 overs. The following season, 1948, was less successful and Cranfield's highest score was just 37; he did, however, take 41 wickets at a respectable average of 29.24 with one five-wicket haul, and he played in 27 matches duringt the season, the most in any single season of first-class cricket. In 1949, though, he lost his place in the side and he retired at the end of the season.

From 1950 to 1952, Cranfield acted as scorer for Gloucestershire. In May 1951, he returned for one final first-class match against Somerset at Taunton.
