= Lionel Hutz =

Fictional character from The Simpsons franchise

- The Simpsons character
- First appearance: "Bart Gets Hit by a Car" (1991)
- Last appearance: "Realty Bites" (1997)
- Created by: Jay Kogen; Mike Scully; John Swartzwelder; Matt Groening
- Designed by: Matt Groening
- Voiced by: Phil Hartman

In-universe information
- Occupation: Lawyer (Main); Shoe repair expert; Real estate broker
- Home: Springfield

Lionel Hutz is a fictional character in the American animated sitcom The Simpsons. He was voiced by Phil Hartman, and his first appearance was in the season two episode "Bart Gets Hit by a Car". Hutz is a stereotypical shady ambulance chasing lawyer in Springfield, with questionable competence and ethics. Nevertheless, he is often hired by the Simpsons. His final speaking role was in the season nine episode "Realty Bites" in December 1997; the character was retired five months later following Hartman's murder. Hutz has since appeared as an occasional non-speaking background character.

== Role in The Simpsons ==
=== Personality ===
Lionel Hutz is an egotistical ambulance chasing personal injury lawyer and, according to Lisa Simpson, a "shyster" whom the Simpsons nonetheless hire as their lawyer in multiple episodes (a fact remarked on by Marge Simpson in a typically self-aware aside), mostly because Hutz is the only legal counsel the Simpsons can afford. His legal practice, shown to be located in a shopping mall, is named "I Can't Believe It's A Law Firm!" and also offers "expert shoe repair." He often tries to entice potential clients with gifts, including a "smoking monkey" doll, a pen that looks like a cigar, an exotic faux-pearl necklace, a business card that "turns into a sponge when you put it in water," and even an almost-full Orange Julius he had been drinking himself. John G. Browning of the Southeast Texas Record describes the character of Hutz as a literal ambulance chaser: "Hutz typifies the sleazy lawyer. He exaggerates his academic credentials ('I've attended Harvard, Yale, MIT, Oxford, the Sorbonne, the Louvre')" and is "the very worst in legal marketing".

Hutz is characterized as both a grossly incompetent lawyer and an unethical individual in general. This is supported in his first appearance in "Bart Gets Hit by a Car", an episode which also demonstrates his greed as he wants half of the Simpsons' settlement money. Hutz is disliked and mistrusted by both Marge and Lisa. In "Bart Gets Hit by a Car", Marge ultimately testifies against Hutz for hiring Dr. Nick, a quack doctor with a shady reputation, and for making Bart lie about his injuries. Hutz's incompetence and greed are also noted by his rival, the more competent Blue Haired Lawyer. In the episode "Marge in Chains" Hutz describes the following as his "problem" with Judge Snyder:

Well, he's had it in for me ever since I kinda ran over his dog. Well, replace the word "kinda" with the word "repeatedly" and the word "dog" with "son".

Hutz is characterized as a recovering alcoholic. In one episode he offers Marge a celebratory "belt of Scotch" at 9:30 in the morning, remarking that he had not slept in days. In the same episode, he hastily leaves the courtroom after handling a bottle of bourbon in order to consult his sponsor, David Crosby. He then gives his closing statement, unaware that he is not wearing any pants, and thinks that Clarence Darrow was "the black guy on The Mod Squad". Beyond practicing law, he also tries his hand at selling real estate, reasoning that it was a natural move as most of his clients ended up losing their homes anyway. Out of desperation for work, he has resorted to babysitting. Hutz, left in charge of the children for longer than he was hired, nods off in a sitting position; he produces a switchblade upon awakening suddenly. He burns all of his personal documentation in the Simpsons fireplace, claiming that "Lionel Hutz" no longer exists and he is now "Miguel Sanchez". His other alias is "Dr. Nguyen Van Phuoc". Hutz's incompetence and financial desperation sometimes lead him to resort to rooting through dumpsters, claiming it is client-related. Hutz was briefly married to Selma Bouvier, although this storyline is not shown in an episode and instead mentioned in "Much Apu About Nothing.” In “Selma's Choice,” Hutz attempts to get his hands on the Bouvier sisters’ Aunt Gladys' inheritance. When he was caught forging Gladys' signature by Marge and Lisa, Hutz was forced to properly read the will and give Marge's family Gladys' inheritance. Hutz has also been known to use a phone booth as an office.

Hutz does not seem to care about conflict of interest; in "A Streetcar Named Marge" he represents clients in a lawsuit against the producers of a local production of A Streetcar Named Desire for not giving them any roles in the play, although he had a role himself.

Another display of his incompetence takes place in "The Boy Who Knew Too Much" when, while representing a French waiter who is accusing Mayor Quimby's nephew Freddy of battery, he is surprised when the opposing counsel mentions that Hutz's client is an immigrant (despite the client's French accent). Hutz then demands that his client tell him everything from then on. Browning wrote that his "courtroom skills leave something to be desired"; in the episode "Marge in Chains", he motions for a "bad court thingy", to which the judge replies "You mean a mistrial?", and then refers to himself as the "law-talking guy".

=== Cases won ===
Although Hutz loses most of his cases in the episodes in which he appears, he does win several cases for the Simpsons. In "Bart the Murderer", he represented Bart when the latter was suspected of the supposed murder of Seymour Skinner, and the charges were dropped when Skinner revealed himself to be alive. In "New Kid on the Block", he represents Homer in his case against the Sea Captain and the Frying Dutchman restaurant over its "All You Can Eat" offer ("The most blatant case of fraudulent advertising since my suit against the film The NeverEnding Story"). He also wins a case for Bart in "The Day the Violence Died", by proving that Itchy was created by an old man named Chester J. Lampwick—though the deciding factor of the case is mainly proven by Bart's footwork to collect the crucial piece of evidence, rather than Hutz's competence. Hutz initiates the trial with zero credible evidence. In "'Round Springfield", Hutz successfully sues Krusty the Clown after Bart accidentally consumes a jagged metal prize from a box of Krusty-O cereal, resulting in an inflamed appendix. After winning the case, Hutz gives Bart only $500 of the $100,000 settlement. In "Sideshow Bob Roberts", Hutz wins a case against Sideshow Bob, who was mayor at that time, for electoral fraud, although Bart and Lisa once again found all the supporting evidence.

The only other case technically won by Hutz was in "Treehouse of Horror IV", where he represents Homer against Satan (who, in a twist, is revealed to resemble Ned Flanders). In a purportedly-deleted scene for this episode, as subsequently seen in "The Simpsons 138th Episode Spectacular", Hutz's slogan is "Cases won in 30 minutes or your pizza is free". After he thinks he has lost the case, he gives the Simpsons their pizza. However, Marge informs him that they did win. Then, he tells them that the box was empty anyway. In the video game The Simpsons: Hit & Run, billboards can be seen around Downtown Springfield promoting Hutz's free pizza offer.

== Creation and retirement ==
Phil Hartman was first suggested for the role of Lionel Hutz by Simpsons writer Jay Kogen, who liked Hartman's "great, strong voice." Writer Mike Scully described Hutz as a "combination of overconfidence and incompetence. He never doubted his ability in the courtroom for some reason, even though he had no idea what was going on."

After Hartman's murder at the hands of his wife, Brynn, on May 28, 1998, Hutz was going to be recast with Harry Shearer, but the character was retired along with Troy McClure, Hartman's other recurring character. The last episode to feature Hutz speaking was the season 9 episode "Realty Bites".

== Reception ==
Entertainment Weekly named Hutz as one of their 15 favorite fictional television and film lawyers. His characterization as an ambulance chaser who is only concerned with money has been viewed as part of a trend away from more noble depictions of lawyers in literature, such as Atticus Finch, and towards more critical depictions of lawyers and the United States legal system. Hutz has also been examined as an example of a fictional depiction of a member of the professional service market in popular culture.
