= List of The New York Times number-one books of 1984 =

The American daily newspaper The New York Times publishes multiple weekly lists ranking the best-selling books in the United States.

== Changes to the list ==
Beginning on January 1, 1984, The New York Times Book Review introduced revised and expanded best seller lists to "clarify categories of book buying". The hardcover books list was previously divided into two lists: fiction (15 titles) and general (15 titles). The hardcover fiction list remained the same, but the hardcover general list was divided into two new lists: nonfiction (15 titles) and advice, how-to, and miscellaneous (5 titles). The nonfiction list would be reserved for "serious nonfiction" while the advice list would be dedicated to the self-improvement genre. This change to the list was made because advice best sellers were sometimes crowding the general nonfiction list. The inaugural number one bestseller of the advice list, The Body Principal by Victoria Principal, had been number 10 and number 12 on the general nonfiction lists for the two preceding weeks.

The paperback books list previously consisted of two categories: mass market and trade. Both categories were eliminated because the editors believed the distinction was "less important to the general reader than to the industry". Mass market and trade were replaced by three new categories: fiction (15 titles), nonfiction (5 titles) and advice, how-to and miscellaneous (10 titles). The miscellaneous category would accommodate cartoon books, joke books and other titles that were not listed before, including "road atlases, tax preparation guides and computer handbooks".

== Fiction ==
The following list ranks the number-one best-selling fiction books, in the hardcover fiction category.

Date	Book	Author
January 1	Poland	James Michener
January 8	Poland	James Michener
January 15	Pet Sematary	Stephen King
January 22	Pet Sematary	Stephen King
January 29	Who Killed the Robins Family?	Thomas Chastain
February 5	Pet Sematary	Stephen King
February 12	Pet Sematary	Stephen King
February 19	Pet Sematary	Stephen King
February 26	Pet Sematary	Stephen King
March 4	Pet Sematary	Stephen King
March 11	The Aquitaine Progression	Robert Ludlum
March 18	The Aquitaine Progression	Robert Ludlum
March 25	The Aquitaine Progression	Robert Ludlum
April 1	The Aquitaine Progression	Robert Ludlum
April 8	The Aquitaine Progression	Robert Ludlum
April 15	The Aquitaine Progression	Robert Ludlum
April 22	The Aquitaine Progression	Robert Ludlum
April 29	The Aquitaine Progression	Robert Ludlum
May 6	The Aquitaine Progression	Robert Ludlum
May 13	The Aquitaine Progression	Robert Ludlum
May 20	The Aquitaine Progression	Robert Ludlum
May 27	The Aquitaine Progression	Robert Ludlum
June 3	Full Circle	Danielle Steel
June 10	Full Circle	Danielle Steel
June 17	Full Circle	Danielle Steel
June 24	Full Circle	Danielle Steel
July 1	The Aquitaine Progression	Robert Ludlum
July 8	"...And Ladies of the Club"	Helen Hooven Santmyer
July 15	"...And Ladies of the Club"	Helen Hooven Santmyer
July 22	"...And Ladies of the Club"	Helen Hooven Santmyer
July 29	"...And Ladies of the Club"	Helen Hooven Santmyer
August 5	"...And Ladies of the Club"	Helen Hooven Santmyer
August 12	"...And Ladies of the Club"	Helen Hooven Santmyer
August 19	"...And Ladies of the Club"	Helen Hooven Santmyer
August 26	First Among Equals	Jeffrey Archer
September 2	First Among Equals	Jeffrey Archer
September 9	First Among Equals	Jeffrey Archer
September 16	The Fourth Protocol	Frederick Forsyth
September 23	The Fourth Protocol	Frederick Forsyth
September 30	The Fourth Protocol	Frederick Forsyth
October 7	The Fourth Protocol	Frederick Forsyth
October 14	The Fourth Protocol	Frederick Forsyth
October 21	The Fourth Protocol	Frederick Forsyth
October 28	The Talisman	Stephen King and Peter Straub
November 4	The Talisman	Stephen King and Peter Straub
November 11	The Talisman	Stephen King and Peter Straub
November 18	The Talisman	Stephen King and Peter Straub
November 25	The Talisman	Stephen King and Peter Straub
December 2	The Talisman	Stephen King and Peter Straub
December 9	The Talisman	Stephen King and Peter Straub
December 16	The Talisman	Stephen King and Peter Straub
December 23	The Talisman	Stephen King and Peter Straub
December 30	The Talisman	Stephen King and Peter Straub

== Nonfiction ==
The following list ranks the number-one best-selling nonfiction books, in the hardcover nonfiction category.

Date	Book	Author
January 1	Motherhood: The Second Oldest Profession	Erma Bombeck
January 8	Motherhood: The Second Oldest Profession	Erma Bombeck
January 15	Motherhood: The Second Oldest Profession	Erma Bombeck
January 22	In Search of Excellence	Thomas J. Peters and Robert H. Waterman Jr.
January 29	In Search of Excellence	Thomas J. Peters and Robert H. Waterman Jr.
February 5	In Search of Excellence	Thomas J. Peters and Robert H. Waterman Jr.
February 12	In Search of Excellence	Thomas J. Peters and Robert H. Waterman Jr.
February 19	In Search of Excellence	Thomas J. Peters and Robert H. Waterman Jr.
February 26	Mayor	Edward I. Koch with William Rauch
March 4	Motherhood: The Second Oldest Profession	Erma Bombeck
March 11	Mayor	Edward I. Koch with William Rauch
March 18	Mayor	Edward I. Koch with William Rauch
March 25	Mayor	Edward I. Koch with William Rauch
April 1	Mayor	Edward I. Koch with William Rauch
April 8	Mayor	Edward I. Koch with William Rauch
April 15	Mayor	Edward I. Koch with William Rauch
April 22	Mayor	Edward I. Koch with William Rauch
April 29	Motherhood: The Second Oldest Profession	Erma Bombeck
May 6	Motherhood: The Second Oldest Profession	Erma Bombeck
May 13	Motherhood: The Second Oldest Profession	Erma Bombeck
May 20	Motherhood: The Second Oldest Profession	Erma Bombeck
May 27	Motherhood: The Second Oldest Profession	Erma Bombeck
June 3	Motherhood: The Second Oldest Profession	Erma Bombeck
June 10	Motherhood: The Second Oldest Profession	Erma Bombeck
June 17	First Lady from Plains	Rosalynn Carter
June 24	Wired	Bob Woodward
July 1	Wired	Bob Woodward
July 8	Wired	Bob Woodward
July 15	Wired	Bob Woodward
July 22	The Kennedys: An American Drama	Peter Collier and David Horowitz
July 29	The Kennedys: An American Drama	Peter Collier and David Horowitz
August 5	The Kennedys: An American Drama	Peter Collier and David Horowitz
August 12	The Kennedys: An American Drama	Peter Collier and David Horowitz
August 19	The Kennedys: An American Drama	Peter Collier and David Horowitz
August 26	The Kennedys: An American Drama	Peter Collier and David Horowitz
September 2	The Kennedys: An American Drama	Peter Collier and David Horowitz
September 9	Loving Each Other	Leo Buscaglia
September 16	Loving Each Other	Leo Buscaglia
September 23	Loving Each Other	Leo Buscaglia
September 30	Loving Each Other	Leo Buscaglia
October 7	Loving Each Other	Leo Buscaglia
October 14	Loving Each Other	Leo Buscaglia
October 21	Loving Each Other	Leo Buscaglia
October 28	Loving Each Other	Leo Buscaglia
November 4	Iacocca: An Autobiography	Lee Iacocca with William Novak
November 11	Iacocca: An Autobiography	Lee Iacocca with William Novak
November 18	Iacocca: An Autobiography	Lee Iacocca with William Novak
November 25	Iacocca: An Autobiography	Lee Iacocca with William Novak
December 2	Iacocca: An Autobiography	Lee Iacocca with William Novak
December 9	Iacocca: An Autobiography	Lee Iacocca with William Novak
December 16	Iacocca: An Autobiography	Lee Iacocca with William Novak
December 23	Iacocca: An Autobiography	Lee Iacocca with William Novak
December 30	Iacocca: An Autobiography	Lee Iacocca with William Novak

== See also ==
- Publishers Weekly list of bestselling novels in the United States in the 1980s
