= The War of the Simpsons =

- The Simpsons episode
- Episode no.: Season 2 Episode 20
- Directed by: Mark Kirkland
- Written by: John Swartzwelder
- Production code: 7F20
- Original air date: May 2, 1991

Episode features
- Chalkboard gag: "I will not do anything bad ever again"
- Couch gag: Homer squeezes everyone off the couch one by one until he has the couch all to himself.
- Commentary: Matt Groening; Mike Reiss; Mark Kirkland

Episode chronology
← Previous "Lisa's Substitute"	Next → "Three Men and a Comic Book"
- The Simpsons season 2

"The War of the Simpsons" is the twentieth episode of the second season of the American animated television series The Simpsons. It originally aired on Fox in the United States on May 2, 1991. In the episode, Homer gets drunk at a dinner party and embarrasses Marge, so she enrolls them in marriage counseling at a lakeside retreat with Reverend Lovejoy.

The episode was written by John Swartzwelder and directed by Mark Kirkland. It was the last episode Kirkland directed during his first year on the show. Although not named until season three's "Black Widower", the character Snake Jailbird appeared for the first time in this episode. "The War of the Simpsons" features songs such as Tom Jones's "It's Not Unusual", Dusty Springfield's "The Look of Love", KC and the Sunshine Band's "That's the Way (I Like It)", and Glen Campbell's "Wichita Lineman".

Since airing, the episode has received mostly positive reviews from television critics. It acquired a Nielsen rating of 11.6 and was the second highest-rated show on Fox the week it aired.

== Plot ==
During a party at the Simpsons' house, Homer humiliates himself by getting drunk, insulting guests, and leering at Maude Flanders' cleavage. At church the next day, Marge signs up for marriage counseling at a weekend retreat hosted by Reverend Lovejoy and his wife Helen. When Homer learns the retreat will be held at Catfish Lake, he packs his fishing equipment, but Marge tells him they are only attending to resolve their marital problems. On the way to the retreat, Homer stops at a bait shop and learns of the legendary catfish General Sherman.

At the lake the next morning, Homer tries to sneak away to fish, upsetting Marge that he would choose fishing over their marriage. Instead of returning to bed, Homer takes a walk and finds an abandoned fishing pole on a dock. As he grabs the pole with General Sherman on the line, the fish yanks him from the pier into a small rowboat and onto the lake. From their cabin window, Marge grows angry watching Homer battle General Sherman. Marge attends the marriage workshops alone while Homer triumphantly docks with General Sherman aboard the boat. When Homer returns, Marge tells him their marriage is in serious trouble if he values fishing more than his wife. To prove his love for her, Homer releases the fish, which swims away.

While Marge and Homer are away, Grampa babysits Bart and Lisa, who trick their grandfather into letting them throw a party. After the party ends, the house is a total mess. When Grampa cries, they fear their mess will land him in trouble with their parents, so they frantically clean the house. Once home, Marge praises Grampa for the house's cleanliness. He reveals his secret is "pretending to cry" to con his grandchildren into cleaning it. Bart and Lisa realize they were tricked as Grampa leaves while laughing at them.

== Production ==
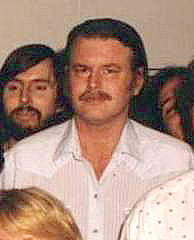
This episode was written by John Swartzwelder.

The episode was written by John Swartzwelder, and it was the last episode Mark Kirkland directed during his first year on the show. Kirkland and his animation team were relatively new to animation when they began working on the show, and to make the animation in this episode the best they had ever done, they incorporated all the techniques they had learned during their first year into it. Kirkland said animating Homer drunk was a challenge for him as he had to analyze how people behave when they are intoxicated by alcohol. He said of the animation: "I shifted [Homer's] eyes open and close, they're not working in sync. And of course Homer can't keep his balance so that's why he's shifting back and forth." Kirkland was raised in New York in an environment similar to the one where the marriage retreat was held. He therefore enjoyed drawing and overseeing the scenery for the episode, and the bait shop was based on the bait shops he visited when he grew up. Snake Jailbird, Springfield's resident recidivist felon, appeared for the first time on the show in this episode, though he was not named until season three's "Black Widower". He appears at Bart and Lisa's wild house party. A woman named Gloria who seeks marriage counseling at the retreat was voiced by Julie Kavner. It is one of the few times in the history of the show that Kavner has voiced a character other than Marge and her relatives. Gloria's hair was based on Kirkland's assistant director Susie Dietter's.

The Simpsons writer Mike Reiss said on the episode's DVD audio commentary that while the episode was "full of funny moments", it caused "nothing but trouble" for the staff. One of those troubles was that after the episode had been written by Swartzwelder, an unsolicited writer sent them a script containing a virtually identical story. To avoid a lawsuit, the staff paid him US$3000 and went forward with theirs. Material cut from the episode's script included many couples who were supposed to be at the retreat instead of the Flanders family, such as Mr. Burns and his mail-order bride, and Mrs. Krabappel trying to reunite with her estranged husband Ken Krabappel. Reiss said the scene played out "horribly badly", and it appeared as if Mr. Burns's mail-order bride was a prostitute. The Ken Krabappel character was supposed to be based on singer Dean Martin, but somehow he ended up with a southern accent that made him sound like a hick. The whole scene was rewritten with help from producer James L. Brooks and it was completed after several hours. A scene in which Moe asked Dr. Hibbert to cure his discolored feces was also removed during the first reading of the script after a complaint by Brooks. Series creator Matt Groening later expressed an objection to the ending, which sees General Sherman jumping out of the water and winking at the camera, believing it to be overly cartoony.

== Cultural references ==
The way Ned Flanders prepares the cocktails at the party is similar to bartending stunts in the 1988 film Cocktail. Songs heard at the party include Tom Jones's "It's Not Unusual" (1965), Dusty Springfield's "The Look of Love" (1967), KC and the Sunshine Band's "That's the Way (I Like It)" (1975), and Glen Campbell's "Wichita Lineman" (1968). Homer's false memory of the party the following day (in which he imagines himself as being erudite and witty instead of drunk) is a reference to the Algonquin Round Table, a group of New York City writers, critics, actors, and wits. The animation style and color scheme matches a typical cover of The New Yorker featuring the magazine's Eustace Tilley character. The "Mexican hat dance" song is heard when Marge turns on the radio in the car to mute the conversation between herself and Homer so the children cannot hear them fight. When Homer comes into the church late, while looking for his chair, a character who strikes a resemblance to Adolf Hitler is seen. In a flashback sequence, Bart remembers chasing away a screaming babysitter with the car as a toddler. This sequence and the music in it are references to a scene in the 1976 film The Omen, in which the Devil's child Damien makes animals shriek in terror as Damien approaches. The picture of General Sherman at the bait shop is a reference to the famous hoax picture of the Loch Ness Monster. John and Gloria are a reference to George and Martha from Who's Afraid of Virginia Woolf? Homer's attempt at catching General Sherman, his bludgeoning of the fish and the line "I love you but I have to kill you" are all based on Santiago's fight with the marlin in Ernest Hemingway's novel The Old Man and the Sea. The battle between Homer and General Sherman is also reminiscent of Captain Ahab's battle with the white whale Moby-Dick in the novel Moby-Dick. Also, General Sherman’s reputation for being the biggest catfish in the lake and his name comes from the real General Sherman, a sequoia tree that holds the record for being the tallest tree ever.

== Reception ==
In its original broadcast, "The War of the Simpsons" finished fortieth in the ratings for the week of April 29 to May 5, 1991, with a Nielsen rating of 11.6, equivalent to approximately 10.8 million viewing households. It was the second highest-rated show on Fox that week, following Married... with Children.

Since airing, the episode has received mostly positive reviews from television critics. The Orlando Sentinel's Gregory Hardy named it the twelfth best episode of the show with a sports theme (sport fishing). The authors of the book I Can't Believe It's a Bigger and Better Updated Unofficial Simpsons Guide, Gary Russell and Gareth Roberts, thought the Homer vs. Marge plot was "good on its own", but it was also "Grampa's big moment. His final revelation to Bart and Lisa is inspired." DVD Movie Guide's Colin Jacobson said the main concern with the episode "stemmed from its start. The scenes at the party were so terrific that the episode could have tanked after that. Happily, it didn't, as the show provided a consistently high level of entertainment. Between Homer's excesses at marriage camp and the kids' antics while Grampa watches them, the program packed in a ton of great gags."

In a review of the second season, Bryce Wilson of Cinema Blend said "The War of the Simpsons" felt "a bit flat", but "even in [its] lowest points, humor is easy to find". Jeremy Kleinman of DVD Talk said it was "another great episode, featuring first, a new level of Homer's debauchery after drinking way too much at a party the Simpsons host, Reverend Lovejoy's marital retreat, and an epic battle with a legendary fish named General Sherman. Each of these portions of the episode are filled with laughs, perhaps the funniest being Homer's distorted high-society recollection of the previous night's events in which he is hailed as charming and a jolly good fellow."
