= Sam Simon =

American television writer and producer (1955–2015)

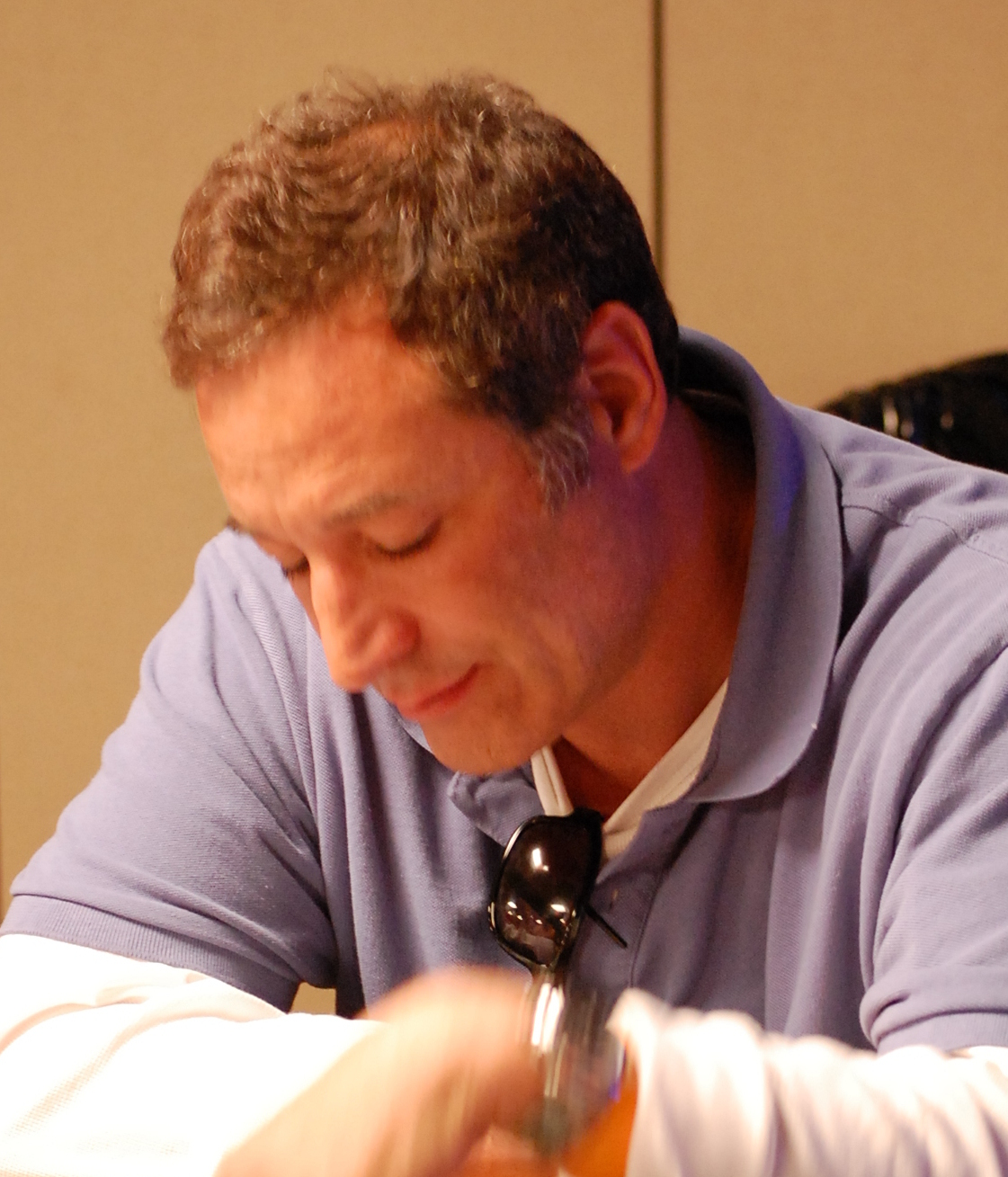
- Simon at a poker tournament in 2008
- Born: Samuel Michael Simon; June 6, 1955; Los Angeles, California, US
- Died: March 8, 2015 (aged 59); Pacific Palisades, Los Angeles, US
- Resting place: Westwood Village Memorial Park Cemetery
- Education: Stanford University
- Occupations: Producer, writer, director
- Years active: 1979–2015
- Notable work: The Simpsons
- Spouses: Jennifer Tilly (m. 1984; div. 1991); Jami Ferrell (m. 2000; div. 2000)

Samuel Michael Simon (June 6, 1955 – March 8, 2015) was an American television writer, producer and animal rights activist who co-developed the animated sitcom The Simpsons.

While at Stanford University, Simon worked as a newspaper cartoonist and after graduating became a storyboard artist at Filmation Studios. Simon submitted a spec script for the sitcom Taxi, which was produced, and he later became the series' showrunner. Over the next few years, Simon wrote and produced for Cheers, It's Garry Shandling's Show and other programs, as well as writing the 1991 film The Super.

Simon turned to fields outside television in his later years. He regularly appeared on Howard Stern's radio shows, managed boxer Lamon Brewster and helped guide him to the World Boxing Organization Heavyweight Championship in 2004, and was a regular poker player and six-time in the money finisher at the World Series of Poker. Simon founded the Sam Simon Foundation, which consists of a mobile veterinary clinic that goes into low-income neighborhoods offering free surgeries for cats and dogs several days per week, as well as a program that rescues and trains shelter dogs. He also funded the Sea Shepherd Conservation Society vessel MY Sam Simon. Simon was engaged at the time of his death, having been previously twice married, including to the actress Jennifer Tilly. Following a profile of Simon on 60 Minutes in 2007, CBS writer Daniel Schorn wrote in an online article that Simon was "perhaps the Renaissance man of the baffling, uncertain age we live in."

Simon was diagnosed with terminal colorectal cancer in 2012 and given only three to six months to live. He bequeathed his $100 million estate to various charities that he actively supported during his lifetime. He died on March 8, 2015.

== Early life ==
Simon was born on June 6, 1955, in Los Angeles, to a Jewish family. He grew up in Beverly Hills and Malibu. Simon's family lived opposite Groucho Marx. Simon's father, nicknamed Monty (after whom Simon named Monty Burns) was a clothing manufacturer of Estonian-Jewish heritage. Simon had a childhood which has been described as "comfortable" and "privileged". Although his parents wanted Simon to become a lawyer, he was interested in art from a young age, appearing on televised local art programs as young as the age of five. He once was told by Walt Disney that he would one day work at his studio.

Simon attended Beverly Hills High School, where he was on the football team and served as a cartoonist for the school newspaper. He was named "Most Humorous" and "Most Talented" in his senior yearbook. He later attended Stanford University, graduating in 1977. Simon had not wished to attend college, but Stanford persuaded him to apply due to his sufficient grades and proficiency at football; Simon quit the football team after one day. Simon drew comics for The Stanford Daily, a college newspaper, but was denied admission to a drawing class for not being talented enough. As he recalled to the Stanford alumni magazine, he was told, "You'd be taking the space of a student who has talent." Simon majored in psychology, but did not focus on his academics.

== Career ==
=== Early career ===
While still at Stanford, Simon's first job was a newspaper sports cartoonist for the San Francisco Chronicle and the San Francisco Examiner. After graduating, he worked as a television storyboard artist, and later a writer, at Filmation Studios. There he worked on several animated shows, including The New Adventures of Mighty Mouse and Heckle & Jeckle and Fat Albert and the Cosby Kids (1979). Simon recalls Filmation approving of his work because he was "self-taught and unschooled," but Simon felt the majority of what the studio produced was "awful". On the suggestion of Filmation producer Lou Scheimer who was impressed by Simon's writing ability, Simon submitted a spec script for the series Taxi which was produced as "Out of Commission" and aired in 1981 during its third season. Simon was hired as a writer, quickly becoming showrunner for its fifth and final season in 1983. Simon next worked as a writer and producer on Cheers from seasons one to three (1982–1985), writing five episodes: "Endless Slumper", "Battle of the Ex's", "Fairytales Can Come True", "Cheerio Cheers" and "The Bartender's Tale". Simon created, wrote and produced the short-lived sitcom Shaping Up in 1984, alongside Ken Estin; the show starred Leslie Nielsen as a gym owner and ran for five episodes on ABC. Simon also wrote and produced for Best of the West (1981), Barney Miller (1982) and It's Garry Shandling's Show (1987–1988), and wrote the 1991 film The Super.

=== The Simpsons ===
In the beginning, I was skeptical it could be successful, but I was not skeptical it could be good. I was hoping for 13 episodes that my friends would like. It's a good lesson, isn't it? If you do something trying to make your friends laugh and that you can be proud of, you can also be successful.

— Simon on his work on The Simpsons.

Simon co-developed the animated series The Simpsons, which premiered on the Fox network in 1989 and has remained on air ever since. The show is regarded as one of the greatest television series of all time, with Time magazine naming it the 20th century's best series. The premise for the series originated as a series of short cartoons airing in 1987 as part of The Tracey Ullman Show, on which Simon was a writer and executive producer alongside James L. Brooks, with whom Simon had worked on Taxi. The cartoons were developed into a full series two years later. For The Simpsons, Simon served alongside Matt Groening (who conceived the show and the five main characters) and Brooks as executive producer and showrunner for the show's first (1989–1990) and second (1990–1991) seasons, and was creative supervisor for the first four seasons. He assembled and led the initial team of writers, consisting of John Swartzwelder, Jon Vitti, George Meyer, Jeff Martin, Al Jean, Mike Reiss, Jay Kogen and Wallace Wolodarsky. The cartoonist and writer Mimi Pond, who wrote the first broadcast episode "Simpsons Roasting on an Open Fire" (1989), claimed that she was not permitted to permanently join the show because Simon deliberately kept women out of the writing team.

Simon has been credited with "developing [the show's] sensibility." Former Simpsons director Brad Bird has described him as "the unsung hero" of the show, while Vitti has stated to "leave out Sam Simon" is to tell "the managed version" of The Simpsons' history, because "he was the guy we wrote for." Writer Ken Levine called Simon "the real creative force behind The Simpsons ... The tone, the storytelling, the level of humor—that was all developed on Sam's watch." Levine says that Simon "brought a level of honesty to the characters" and made them "three-dimensional", adding that his "comedy is all about character, not just a string of gags. In The Simpsons, the characters are motivated by their emotions and their foibles. 'What are they thinking?'—that is Sam's contribution. The stories come from the characters." Simon crafted much of the world of Springfield, and designed the models for many of the show's recurring characters, including Mr. Burns, Dr. Hibbert, Chief Wiggum and Eddie and Lou, as well as many of the one-time and guest-star roles, such as Bleeding Gums Murphy. One of his contributions to the show's character development was his proposal that Waylon Smithers should be gay, but that this should never have too much attention drawn to it; Smithers' sexuality became one of the show's longest-running gags. Simon saw The Simpsons as a chance to solve "what [he] didn't like about the Saturday-morning cartoon shows [he had] worked on ... [he] wanted all the actors in a room together, not reading their lines separated from each other. The Simpsons would have been a great radio show. If you just listen to the sound track, it works."

The Simpsons utilized a process of collaborative script re-writing by the show's whole writing staff; this meant the credited writer may not have been responsible for the majority of an episode's content. Nevertheless, Simon was credited with co-writing the season one episodes "The Telltale Head," "The Crepes of Wrath," and the season finale "Some Enchanted Evening." "Some Enchanted Evening" was intended to be the show's premiere but was delayed due to substandard animation. Simon adapted Edgar Allan Poe's "The Raven" for the third segment of the season two episode "Treehouse of Horror." Groening was nervous about "The Raven" because it did not have many gags, and felt it would be "the worst, most pretentious thing [they had] ever done" on the show. Nevertheless, the segment has often been praised as one of the best Treehouse of Horror stories in the show's history. Ryan J. Budke of TV Squad described the segment as "one of the most refined Simpsons pop references ever", and knows "people that consider this the point that they realized The Simpsons could be both highly hilarious and highly intelligent." Simon co-wrote the episode "Two Cars in Every Garage and Three Eyes on Every Fish" with Swartzwelder, an episode which Tom Shales of The Washington Post has described as "a bull's-eye political satire". The final episode he co-wrote for season two was "The Way We Was", alongside Jean and Reiss. While Reiss and Jean took over as showrunners, Simon remained on the writing staff for seasons three (1991–92) and four (1992–93). For the third season he co-wrote "Treehouse of Horror II," and conceived the story for the Sideshow Bob episode "Black Widower", together with mystery author Thomas Chastain, hoping to construct a full mystery story; Vitti wrote the episode's teleplay. Simon also substantially contributed to the episode "Stark Raving Dad," pitched the episode "Homer at the Bat," and proposed the "Land of Chocolate" sequence from "Burns Verkaufen der Kraftwerk." Simon's final writing credit was for the "Dial 'Z' For Zombies" segment of "Treehouse of Horror III."

Although they initially worked well together, Simon and Groening's relationship became "very contentious" according to Groening. Simon never expected the show to be a success, often proclaiming to fellow staff members "We're thirteen and out"—meaning that the show would be cancelled after the thirteenth episode of the first season. Therefore, he also told the staff that they had creative freedom to do whatever they wanted to make The Simpsons as good a show as possible, regardless of network or public opinion, because he thought it inevitably would not be renewed; he elaborated in 2009 that "Really I was saying that to take the pressure off of everyone. I was just saying let's just go out and make 13 episodes that are really good and really funny." However, Groening interpreted it as meaning Simon was uncommitted and did not care whether the show was a success or not, as Simon's career would survive, whereas his own would not. In 2001, Groening described Simon as "brilliantly funny and one of the smartest writers I've ever worked with, although unpleasant and mentally unbalanced." According to John Ortved's book The Simpsons: An Uncensored, Unauthorized History, when the show became successful Simon resented the media attention Groening received, particularly the praise for the show's writing; Simon felt that Groening's involvement was limited, and that he should have been the one receiving credit for the show. Simon later spoke well of Groening's influence, particularly on the show's positive tone.

As well as Groening, Simon was often at odds with Brooks and production company Gracie Films. While working on The Simpsons, he and Brooks had co-created the series Sibs (1991) and Phenom (1993) as part of a multi-series deal for ABC. Simon did not want to work on either series, both of which were poorly received and swiftly canceled, which put a strain on the pair's relationship.

Simon left The Simpsons in 1993; he commented that he "wasn't enjoying it anymore", wished to pursue other projects, and that of "any show I've ever worked on, it turns me into a monster. I go crazy. I hate myself." Before leaving, he negotiated a deal that saw him receive a share of the show's profits every year, particularly from home media, and an executive producer credit despite not having worked on the show since 1993. The deal means he made over $10 million a year from The Simpsons; he later told Stanford Magazine that "tens of millions" was a closer figure. Simon commented: "When I was there I thought I was underpaid. I thought I wasn't getting enough credit for it. Now, I think it's completely the opposite. I get too much credit for it. And the money is ridiculous."

=== Subsequent media work ===
In January 1994, Simon co-created with comedian George Carlin the sitcom The George Carlin Show for Fox. It aired for 27 episodes before being canceled in December 1995. Simon served as showrunner throughout its run and directed several episodes. Simon persuaded Carlin to do the show after writing it as something which would not be "typically sitcomy." He conceived the show as what Carlin's life would have been like had he never become a comedian; Carlin played a heavy drinking New York taxi driver. Simon commented: "When I was doing The Simpsons, people couldn't see how smart it was because of the low moments. There's something about this show. People who like it say it's classy. They don't see how vulgar it is." Carlin wrote negatively of his relationship with Simon. On his own website, Carlin wrote of the show: "always check mental health of creative partner beforehand. Loved the actors, loved the crew. Had a great time. Couldn't wait to get the fuck out of there." In his final book, the posthumously published Last Words (2009), Carlin elaborated: "I had a great time. I never laughed so much, so often, so hard as I did with cast members Alex Rocco, Chris Rich, Tony Starke. There was a very strange, very good sense of humor on that stage ... The biggest problem, though, was that Sam Simon was a fucking horrible person to be around. Very, very funny, extremely bright and brilliant, but an unhappy person who treated other people poorly." Simon described himself as "combative" and said that most people see him as having a "bad attitude".

In the late 1990s, Simon primarily worked as a director. He directed on the American adaptation of the sitcom Men Behaving Badly in 1996, the Friends season three episode "The One Without the Ski Trip" in 1997, and several episodes of The Norm Show (1999) and The Michael Richards Show (2000). From 1998 to 2003, he served as a consulting producer and director for The Drew Carey Show, and directed the show's series finale. He was also a creative consultant on Bless This House in 1996.

From 1999 to some time in the early 2000s, Simon was President of e-Nexus Studios the once entertainment content arm of ZeniMax Media, Parent Company of video game publisher Bethesda Softworks. After E-Nexus was shut down, Simon became President of the creative group at ZeniMax Productions, another subsidiary of ZeniMax. ZeniMax Productions and its sister division Vir2L Studios jointly created four online games featured on the website for the series Survivor: The Australian Outback.

After leaving The Simpsons and The George Carlin Show, Simon sought to find a "life outside television", as working in the industry "made [him] crazy." On working in television, Simon concluded: "In some ways, it's the greatest job in the world. You make a product that's given away, and all it does is make people smile. Nobody gets hurt, there's no damage, and you can get crazy rich." Simon retired from full-time television work, although still worked in the media, frequently contributing, as a writer and a participant, to Howard Stern's radio shows. He wrote and directed the one-off radio sitcom "The Bitter Half" for Stern's Howard 101 in 2006. Simon had his own show on Radioio. Simon returned to television production work in 2012, serving as a consultant and director on the series Anger Management for half a day a week.

=== Other ventures ===
==== Animal rights ====
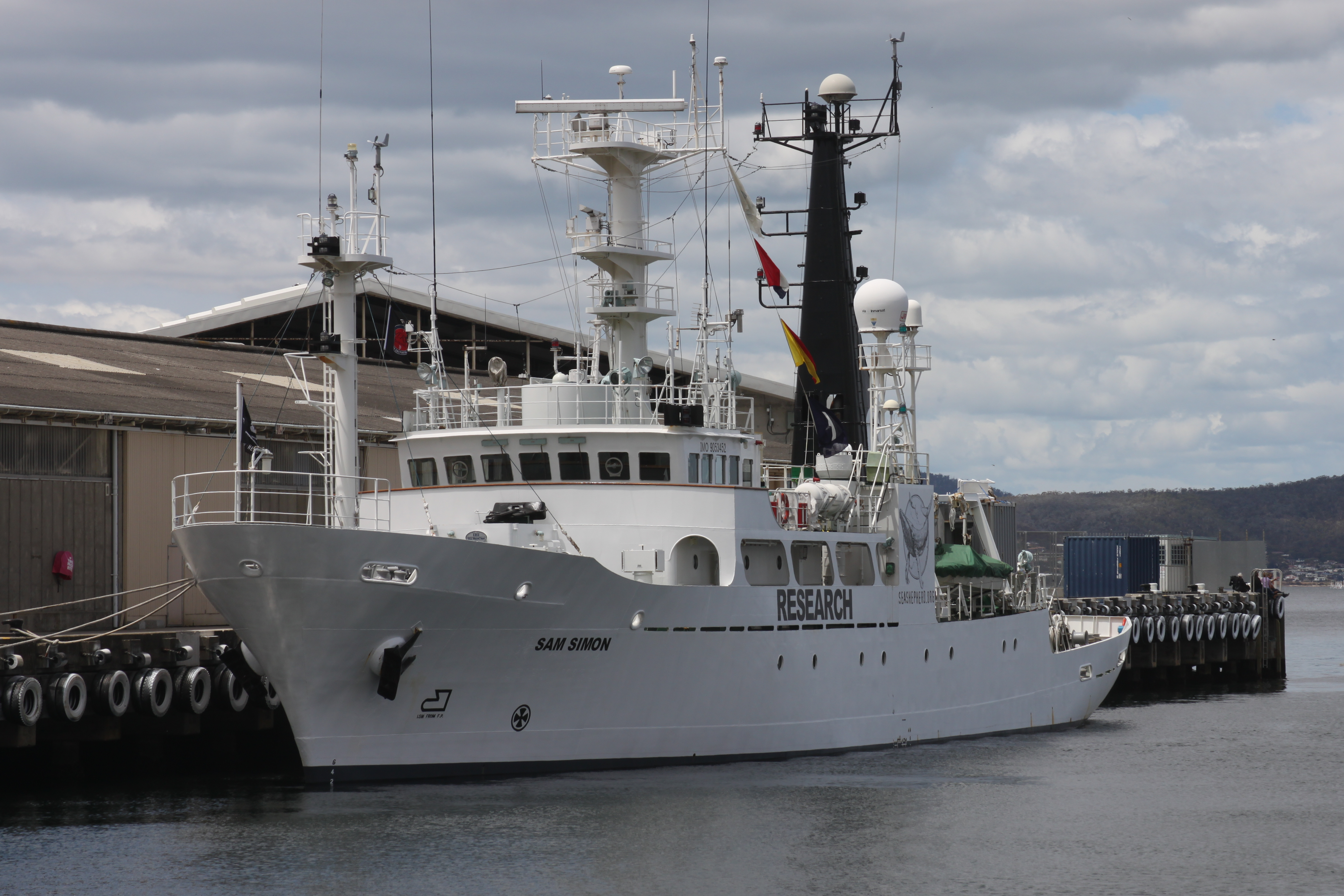
The MY Sam Simon Sea Shepherd vessel paid for by, and named after, Simon

Simon was a staunch advocate for animal rights and veganism, and described himself as an "animal lover". Around the year 2000, he joined People for the Ethical Treatment of Animals (PETA). Starting in 2002, he self-funded, at an annual cost of several million dollars, The Sam Simon Foundation, which has a mobile clinic that provides free surgeries for cats and dogs, as well as rescuing and retraining shelter dogs who might otherwise be euthanized. An episode of 60 Minutes broadcast in March 2007 described it as "the grandest dog shelter in the country, a five star, [6 acres (0.024 km^{2}; 0.0094 sq mi)] spread in Malibu, perhaps the most desirable real estate on the planet. Here, among the waterfalls and the manicured grounds, The Sam Simon Foundation gives stray and abandoned dogs a new lease on life, literally."

As Simon explained, the foundation aims to "rescue dogs" and "train them to be service dogs, [to help] people with disabilities," primarily the deaf. It also provides free veterinary surgeries to pets belonging to low-income families, and trains dogs to help soldiers returning from combat in Iraq and Afghanistan deal with post-traumatic stress disorder. Simon said the money he used was "well spent just for the pleasure it gives me." The training program has a 20% success rate, because many of the rescued dogs "have physical and psychological problems" but the dogs who cannot be trained are put up for adoption. The foundation is non-profit, and does not accept public donations. In 2011, Simon established and self-funded a second non-profit called The Sam Simon Foundation: Feeding Families. This is a food truck which delivers vegan food to about 200 low-income families each week. He also donated an undisclosed sum to the Sea Shepherd Conservation Society in 2012 for the purpose of purchasing another vessel for their fleet, the MY Sam Simon, which was unveiled in December 2012. Simon was also a board member for Save the Children, and hosted the largest annual fundraiser for PETA, who named him an Honorary Director and their Norfolk, Virginia headquarters building after him. Simon has stated that animal rights charities have been his main preference for donations, over other causes like human disease and environmental damage, because "your money can bring success" with visible results. Simon stated in 2011 that there is "nothing [which gives him] more pleasure than" helping others via his charities, and gave away most of his fortune.

==== Boxing ====
It's more than a hobby. I take my responsibilities very seriously and get very involved emotionally in Lamon's fights. The three days before a fight feel like they're an hour or two long for me. I love the rules meetings and press conferences and hanging out in the hotel lobby with the fighters. But on the night of a fight, once we get to the locker room, everything moves very slowly. I feel very tense in a way that nothing else, including my own wrestling matches and gym fights, ever made me feel. I'm aware that Lamon's career is on the line and he's risking his life every time he steps into the ring.

— Simon in 2004 on his role as Lamon Brewster's manager.

Simon was a long time fan of boxing, attending fights with his grandfather, but his interest increased particularly after seeing the 1990 heavyweight championship fight between Evander Holyfield and James "Buster" Douglas, which he described as "the most electrifying feeling I'd had in my life." He began training and won six out of nine amateur fights; he was also a reserve contestant on the Fox series Celebrity Boxing. Simon was for eight years the manager of heavyweight boxer Lamon Brewster, the now-retired former World Boxing Organization heavyweight champion. He met Brewster in 1997 and began managing him, helping him rise to the top of the WBO rankings. He considers guiding Brewster to his April 2004 victory over Wladimir Klitschko to win the vacant WBO Heavyweight Championship, with Klitschko the heavy favorite, to be amongst the greatest moments of his life; it "eclipsed everything he had achieved in a glittering 26-year showbiz career." Before the Klitschko fight, Simon calculated he had spent several hundred thousand dollars funding Brewster, paying him a large salary on top of match fees as well as letting him stay rent-free at one of his houses, and taking only a 10% cut of the match fees; however, he never intended boxing to be a substantial "source of revenue". Simon also briefly managed heavyweight Steve Vukosa, but retired from boxing management soon after Brewster became WBO Heavyweight Champion.

==== Poker ====
Simon was a regular player of poker, and Texas hold 'em in particular. He was introduced to the game as a child through weekly family poker games and casino trips with his grandfather. Simon did not consider himself a serious player until a game at writer David Steinberg's house with several "scholarly" players, which encouraged him to study the game and enter numerous tournaments, although he decided not to become professional. He competed at the World Series of Poker (WSOP) each year between 2007 and 2011, finishing in the money in six events. In 2007, at the 6,358-player $10,000 No-Limit Texas Hold'em Main Event, he finished 329th with $39,445. He also finished 16th, winning $35,493 at the $1,000 1,048-player No-Limit Hold'em w/Re-Buys in 2007; 41st, winning $10,708 at the $1,000 706-player No-Limit Hold'em w/ReBuys in 2008; 53rd, winning $10,692 at the $1,000 879-player No-Limit Hold'em w/ReBuys in 2008; 20th, winning $24,066 at the $10,000 275-player World Championship Pot-Limit Hold'em in 2009; and 500th, winning $23,876 at the $10,000 6,865-player No-Limit Hold'em Championship in 2011. He also won the $300 438-player No-Limit Hold'em Bounty $100,000 Guarantee at the 2009 L.A. Poker Open, winning $22,228. His biggest win in terms of both field size and prize money was the $200 1,082-player No-Limit Hold'em $150,000 Guarantee at the 2010 Winnin O' The Green, where he won $57,308. Simon's private poker games between him and his celebrity friends have been described as "raucous and very entertaining". Their reputation led Playboy TV to produce the show Sam's Game, a televised version featuring Simon as host and master of ceremonies of a Las Vegas celebrity Texas Hold 'em match; he produced the show. He had previously appeared on a 2009 episode of High Stakes Poker.

== Awards ==
Awards and nominations
Year	Award	Category	Nominated work	Result	Ref.
1983	Primetime Emmy Awards	Outstanding Comedy Series	Taxi	Nominated	
1985	Primetime Emmy Awards	Outstanding Comedy Series	Cheers	Nominated	
1986	Writers Guild of America Awards	Episodic Comedy	Cheers: "Fairy Tales Can Come True"	Nominated	
1987	Primetime Emmy Awards	Outstanding Writing for a Variety or Music Program	The Tracey Ullman Show	Nominated	
1988	Primetime Emmy Awards	Outstanding Writing for a Comedy Series	It's Garry Shandling's Show: "Angelica, Part 2"	Nominated	
1988	Primetime Emmy Awards	Outstanding Writing for a Variety or Music Program	The Tracey Ullman Show	Nominated	
1989	Primetime Emmy Awards	Outstanding Variety, Music or Comedy Program	The Tracey Ullman Show	Nominated	
1989	Primetime Emmy Awards	Outstanding Writing for a Variety or Music Program	The Tracey Ullman Show	Nominated	
1990	Primetime Emmy Awards	Outstanding Animated Program (for Programming One Hour or Less)	The Simpsons: "Life on the Fast Lane"	Won	
1990	Primetime Emmy Awards	Outstanding Animated Program (for Programming One Hour or Less)	The Simpsons: "Simpsons Roasting on an Open Fire"	Nominated	
1990	Primetime Emmy Awards	Outstanding Variety, Music or Comedy Series	The Tracey Ullman Show	Nominated	
1990	Primetime Emmy Awards	Outstanding Variety, Music or Comedy Special	The Best of The Tracey Ullman Show	Nominated	
1990	Primetime Emmy Awards	Outstanding Writing for a Variety or Music Program	The Tracey Ullman Show	Won	
1991	Primetime Emmy Awards	Outstanding Animated Program (for Programming One Hour or Less)	The Simpsons: "Homer vs. Lisa and the 8th Commandment"	Won	
1992	Primetime Emmy Awards	Outstanding Animated Program (for Programming One Hour or Less)	The Simpsons: "Radio Bart"	Nominated	
1995	Primetime Emmy Awards	Outstanding Animated Program (for Programming One Hour or Less)	The Simpsons: "Lisa's Wedding"	Won	
1996	Primetime Emmy Awards	Outstanding Animated Program (for Programming One Hour or Less)	The Simpsons: "Treehouse of Horror VI"	Nominated	
1997	Primetime Emmy Awards	Outstanding Animated Program (for Programming One Hour or Less)	The Simpsons: "Homer's Phobia"	Won	
1998	Primetime Emmy Awards	Outstanding Animated Program (for Programming One Hour or Less)	The Simpsons: "Trash of the Titans"	Won	
1999	Primetime Emmy Awards	Outstanding Animated Program (for Programming One Hour or Less)	The Simpsons: "Viva Ned Flanders"	Nominated	
2000	Primetime Emmy Awards	Outstanding Animated Program (for Programming One Hour or Less)	The Simpsons: "Behind the Laughter"	Won	
2001	Primetime Emmy Awards	Outstanding Animated Program (for Programming Less than One Hour)	The Simpsons: "HOMR"	Won	
2002	Primetime Emmy Awards	Outstanding Animated Program (for Programming Less than One Hour)	The Simpsons: "She of Little Faith"	Won	
2013	Writers Guild of America Awards	Animation Writers Caucus Animation Writing Award		Won	
2014	Writers Guild of America Awards	Valentine Davies Award		Won	

Additionally, Simon won a Peabody Award for The Simpsons in 1996.

== Personal life ==
Simon was married to actress and fellow poker player Jennifer Tilly from 1984 to 1991; they remained friends after their divorce. As of 2018, Tilly receives 30 percent of net proceeds that Simon's estate receives from the show. He married Playboy Playmate Jami Ferrell in 2000, and the marriage lasted three weeks. Simon was engaged to chef and caterer Jenna Stewart around 2011. In 2012, he began dating Kate Porter, a make-up artist; they were together until his death.

Simon became a vegetarian at the age of 19 and when joining People for the Ethical Treatment of Animals around 2000, he turned to veganism. He had three dogs.

He lived in Pacific Palisades, Los Angeles, in the restored Bailey House, designed by Richard Neutra. After his home was destroyed by a fire in 2007, Simon redesigned it to be environmentally friendly; much of the interior is constructed from recycled materials, while solar panels provide virtually its entire power needs. The building has a Leadership in Energy and Environmental Design Gold certificate. He had an extensive art collection; he owned paintings by Thomas Hart Benton, John Singer Sargent and one of the original casts of Auguste Rodin's The Thinker. He also had a sculpture by Robert Graham and works by Alberto Vargas, Gil Elvgren, Ed Ruscha and Richard Estes.

== Illness and death ==
In late 2012, Simon was diagnosed with terminal colorectal cancer that later metastasized to his other organs, including his liver and kidneys. He had been feeling ill for some time and had earlier been misdiagnosed. He was given between three and six months to live; chemotherapy treatment reduced the size of his tumors over the following six months. He arranged for his fortune to be left to various charitable causes, stating: "The truth is, I have more money than I'm interested in spending. Everyone in my family is taken care of. And I enjoy this." Simon died in his Los Angeles home from complications of the disease on March 8, 2015, aged 59. His remains are interred at Westwood Village Memorial Park Cemetery in Los Angeles.

Controversy surrounds the management of his trust as well as the lack of donations to groups that he supported in his lifetime.

The Simpsons episode "Waiting for Duffman" was dedicated to him.

== Filmography ==
Credits in films and television productions
Year	Title	Medium	Role	Notes
1979	The New Adventures of Mighty Mouse and Heckle & Jeckle	TV series	Storyboard artist, writer	
1979	Fat Albert and the Cosby Kids	TV series	Storyboard artist, writer	
1981	Best of the West	TV series	Writer	
1982	Barney Miller	TV series	Writer	
1981–1983	Taxi	TV series	Executive story editor, showrunner, producer, writer	
1982–1985	Cheers	TV series	Producer, writer	
1984	Shaping Up	TV series	Creator, executive producer, writer	
1987–1988	It's Garry Shandling's Show	TV series	Creative consultant, writer	
1987–1989	The Tracey Ullman Show	TV series	Executive producer, writer	
1989–1993	The Simpsons	TV series	Character designer, creative supervisor, developer, executive producer, showrunner, writer	Left in 1993, but still receives an executive producer credit on later episodes, even after his death in 2015.
1991	Sibs	TV series	Creator, writer	
1991	The Super	Feature film	Writer	
1993	Phenom	TV series	Creator, writer	
1994–1995	The George Carlin Show	TV series	Co-creator, director, executive producer, showrunner, writer	
1996	Men Behaving Badly	TV series	Director	
1996	Bless This House	TV series	Creative consultant	
1997	Friends	TV series	Director	
1998–2003	The Drew Carey Show	TV series	Consulting producer, director, writer	
1999	The Norm Show	TV series	Director	
2000	The Michael Richards Show	TV series	Director	
2000	American Adventure	TV film	Executive producer	
2001	Rock & Roll Back to School Special	TV film	Consulting producer, writer	
2001	House of Cards	TV film	Executive producer, writer	
2009	Sam's Game	Reality TV series	Creator, executive producer, host	
2012	Anger Management	TV series	Consultant, director	
