= Black Widower =

- The Simpsons episode
- Episode no.: Season 3 Episode 21
- Directed by: David Silverman
- Story by: Sam Simon; Thomas Chastain
- Teleplay by: Jon Vitti
- Production code: 8F20
- Original air date: April 9, 1992

Guest appearance
- Kelsey Grammer as Sideshow Bob

Episode features
- Chalkboard gag: "Funny noises are not funny"
- Couch gag: Two thieves are carting the couch away. The family leaps onto the couch, but the thieves dump them on the floor and continue stealing it.
- Commentary: Matt Groening; Al Jean; Mike Reiss; Julie Kavner; Jon Vitti; David Silverman

Episode chronology
← Previous "Colonel Homer"	Next → "The Otto Show"
- The Simpsons season 3

"Black Widower" is the twenty-first episode of the third season of the American animated television series The Simpsons. It originally aired on Fox in the United States on April 9, 1992. The episode was written by Jon Vitti, with a story conceived by Sam Simon and Thomas Chastain, and directed by David Silverman. Kelsey Grammer guest-starred as Sideshow Bob for the second time, becoming a reoccurring character as Bart's archenemy.

In this episode, Sideshow Bob — Bart's new archenemy — returns, apparently in a romantic relationship with Bart's aunt Selma, but when Bart later realizes that Bob is planning to kill Selma, he prevents the attempted murder and Bob is sent back to prison. "Black Widower" finished 39th in Nielsen ratings for the week that it originally aired. Reviewers generally enjoyed the episode, and gave Grammer's portrayal of Sideshow Bob particular praise.

== Plot ==
The Simpsons have dinner with Selma and her new boyfriend Sideshow Bob. Bob's presence frightens Bart and Lisa. During dinner, Bob reveals that while he was in prison, he began building up hatred and the desire to kill Bart for exposing his crime of framing Krusty the Clown (Note: As depicted in the 1990 episode "Krusty Gets Busted".) and started plotting revenge. However, after receiving Selma's response to his "Prison Pen Pal" ad, he fell in love with her and was inspired to become a model prisoner, earning an early release.

Bob proposes to Selma and she accepts. He makes an appearance at a Krusty the Clown telethon and they reconcile. Lisa encourages Bart to forgive Bob, but Bart refuses to believe he is reformed. When Selma discovers that Bob detests MacGyver, the marriage is nearly called off until Bob takes Homer's suggestion to let Selma watch it alone while he takes a walk.

Whilst planning for the wedding, Selma reveals that she has no sense of smell or taste after a mishap with a bottle rocket as a child, and at the wedding reception, she announces that she has cut back on cigarettes, smoking only after meals and episodes of MacGyver. Selma sends the Simpsons a tape of their honeymoon which captures Bob's tirade over the lack of a gas fireplace in their hotel room. While watching MacGyver with Patty that night, Bart realizes that Selma is in danger and the Simpsons rush to the hotel room.

When Selma retires alone to watch MacGyver, her hotel room explodes. Bob returns, expecting Selma dead, but she is unscathed, and the Simpsons and the police apprehend Bob. Bart explains how he exposed Bob's scheme: Bob opened the gas valve in the hotel room, knowing Selma would not smell the leak. He left while she watched MacGyver, knowing she would light a cigarette afterwards and cause an explosion. Although Bart foiled the plot, Chief Wiggum absent-mindedly threw a match into the room after lighting a celebratory cigar, causing the explosion. Bob, vowing revenge on Bart, is led away by the police. As Selma blames herself for almost getting killed, Marge praises Bart for foiling Bob's plot and not losing his mistrust of Bob.

== Production ==
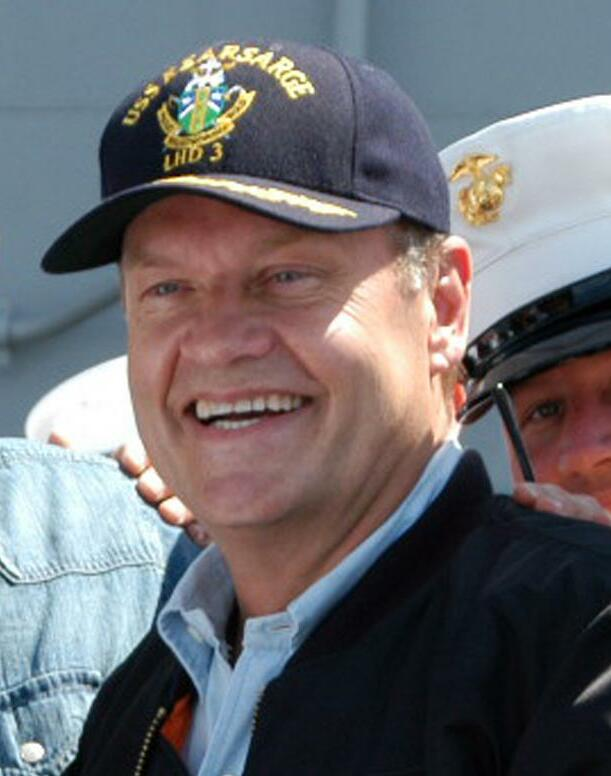
Kelsey Grammer returned to play Sideshow Bob for the episode "Black Widower".

"Black Widower" was conceived by Sam Simon and Thomas Chastain who received story credits, with a teleplay written by Jon Vitti and direction by David Silverman. The staff wanted an episode involving a "mystery", so executive producer Sam Simon approached Thomas Chastain, head of the Mystery Writers of America, to help construct the mystery. A number of clues leading up to the revelation at the end were inserted into the script so viewers would be able to solve the mystery on their own. As the episode was being written, the writers had their eyes towards winning an Edgar Award, awarded by the Mystery Writers of America to the best mystery fiction in print, television and film. Despite their efforts, "Black Widower" was not nominated for an Edgar Award.

In the episode, the writers echoed the premise of Wile E. Coyote by having Sideshow Bob unexpectedly insert himself into Bart's life and attempt to kill him. Executive producer Al Jean has compared Bob's character to that of Wile E. Coyote, noting that both are intelligent, yet always foiled by what they perceive as an inferior intellect. For "Black Widower", director David Silverman updated the character model of Bob to reflect the animation of director Brad Bird. One of Bob's prison friends is Snake Jailbird. He first appeared in the season two episode "The War of the Simpsons" only as "Jailbird", but his full name was first mentioned in "Black Widower". The writers named him Snake after the snake tattoo on his arm, and he has been so called ever since.

"Black Widower" was the second episode in which Kelsey Grammer guest starred as Sideshow Bob. He had previously appeared in the season one episode "Krusty Gets Busted", in which Bart gets Bob sentenced to jail for framing Krusty for armed robbery. Grammer initially expected to voice Bob in a one-time role, but the character was well-liked enough to have him brought back. Sideshow Bob eventually became one of the most popular roles Grammer ever played, and Bob became a recurring character. Grammer bases his Bob voice on theatre actor and director Ellis Rabb. He had once worked for Rabb, whose "lamenting tones became [the] foundation for Sideshow Bob".

== Cultural references ==
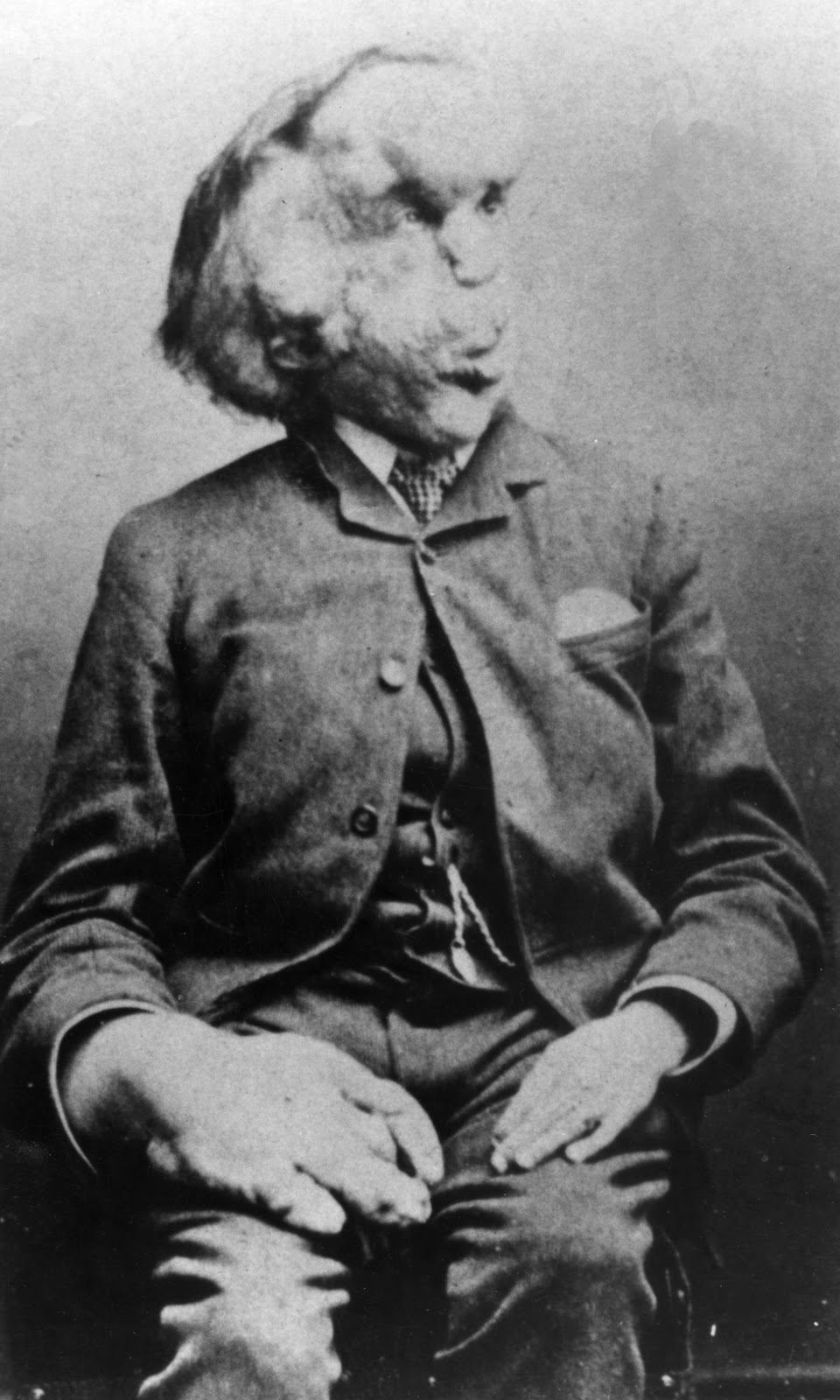
Lisa imagines that Selma's new boyfriend is The Elephant Man.

The episode begins with the family, except for Marge, watching a parody of Dinosaurs on television. The staff thought Dinosaurs was a knock-off of The Simpsons; at one point Bart exclaims "It's like they saw our lives and put it right on screen!" Before she reveals to the Simpson family that Selma's new boyfriend is Bob, Patty says there is something "disturbing" about him, which results in Lisa's imagining him as The Elephant Man. Bob tells Homer he's forgetting the first two noble truths of the Buddha. As Bob remembers his time in prison, there is a scene of him picking up roadside trash, modeled on Cool Hand Luke (1967). The music in the scene is a reference to the film's soundtrack. Bob also remembers winning a Daytime Emmy Award in the "Best Supporting Performer in a Children's Program" category. In Selma's letters to Sideshow Bob, she refers to him by his prison number, 24601, which is Jean Valjean's prison number in Victor Hugo's Les Misérables. The song Selma and Sideshow Bob sing as a montage is "Somethin' Stupid", made famous by Frank Sinatra and his daughter Nancy. The reunion between Krusty and Bob at the telethon is a reference to a surprise reunion between former comedy partners Jerry Lewis and Dean Martin on a 1970s telethon. The chairman character in the telethon scene is a reference to Frank Sinatra, who was nicknamed "the chairman of the board" and who reunited Martin and Lewis at the surprise reunion. The telethon logo features an Al Hirschfeld-style caricature of Krusty.

"Black Widower" was the second episode to show Patty and Selma's obsession with MacGyver, which has become a recurring joke. When Sideshow Bob goes into the room to see Selma's corpse, he turns around the chair, only to see Bart sitting in it. Bob turns around and sees Selma in the doorway. These shots, from Bob turning the chair to Selma in the doorway, are a reference to the climax of Alfred Hitchcock's Psycho (1960). Alf Clausen's music in the scene references to Bernard Herrmann's in Psycho. In Bart's retelling of the story at the end of the episode, Homer shouts "To the Simpsonmobile!", a reference to Batman's batmobile. When Sideshow Bob realizes he's been caught he says, "My best laid plans have gang agley," referencing Robert Burns's poem "To a Mouse".

== Reception ==
In its original American broadcast, "Black Widower" finished 39th in Nielsen ratings for the week of April 6–12, 1992, making The Simpsons the third-highest rated television series on Fox that week, after Married... with Children and In Living Color.

In I Can't Believe It's a Bigger and Better Updated Unofficial Simpsons Guide, Gary Russell wrote that he considered the episode a "terrific show", appreciating Grammer's work in particular, and he also enjoyed the Dinosaurs gag and Bob's reaction to MacGyver, which he remarked "make the whole thing great fun". Bill Gibron of DVD Verdict rated the episode 97%, and considered it a "timeless treat" because of Sideshow Bob's appearance, calling it "excellent from beginning to end".

Nate Meyers of the website digitallyOBSESSED rated the episode a 3 (of 5). He felt the episode was "not a strong entry to the series", noting that "the love story between Bob and Selma never seems to play as well as it should". Colin Jacobson of DVD Movie Guide remarked that later episodes of The Simpsons seasons were typically of lesser quality than episodes that appeared earlier in a season because of "general tiredness and the pressure of creating so many programs". However, he found "Black Widower" an exception, noting that most episodes featuring Sideshow Bob rarely disappoint. Hock Guan Teh of DVD Town applauded Grammer's performance as Sideshow Bob in the episode, saying he could not "get over Sideshow Bob´s evil and conniving tone of voice, all delivered in a pseudo-Anglophile accent".

Nathan Rabin asks, "How great is Grammer as Sideshow Bob? He manages to make a prissy elitist scary. There is a musicality and a poetry to his performance, an almost hypnotic rhythm to the way he delivers a line like, 'Ah, fire: scourge of Prometheus, toaster of marshmallows, eradicator of dead wood.' In depth, richness, multi-dimensionality and language, Sideshow Bob might just be the most Shakespearean character in The Simpsons universe... It's a testament to how thoroughly Sideshow Bob and Grammer's performance dominate the episode that Bart, our ostensible boy detective hero, barely registers. Then again, the bad guy always gets the best lines. Where The Simpsons and Sideshow Bob are concerned, he also gets the best episodes and this funny, scary, and quietly sad episode is right up there."
