= List of Playboy Playmates of 1997 =

The following is a list of Playboy Playmates of 1997. Playboy magazine names its Playmate of the Month each month throughout the year.

== January ==
Jami Ferrell

Personal details
- Born: June 20, 1974 (age 52) Muncie, Indiana, U.S.
- Height: 5 ft 8 in (1.73 m)

Jami Ferrell (born June 20, 1974, in Muncie, Indiana) is an American model and actress. She is the Playboy's Playmate and Playboy (Germany): Playmate of the Month for January 1997. She was married to Simpsons producer Sam Simon for three weeks in 2000. Afterwards she dated Playboy founder Hugh Hefner and actor Jack Nicholson.

== February ==
Kimber West

Personal details
- Born: May 23, 1974 (age 52) Atlanta, Georgia, U.S.
- Height: 5 ft 9.5 in (1.765 m)

Kimber West (born May 23, 1974, in Atlanta) is an American model. She was Playboy magazine's American Playmate of the Month for February 1997 and German Playmate of the Month for January 1998.

== March ==
Jennifer Miriam

Personal details
- Born: May 2, 1972 (age 54) Oklahoma City, Oklahoma, U.S.
- Height: 5 ft 5 in (1.65 m)

Jennifer Miriam (born May 2, 1972, in Oklahoma City, Oklahoma) is an American model and actress. She is Playboy magazine's Playmate of the Month for March 1997. Her centerfold was photographed by Arny Freytag and Stephen Wayda.

== April ==
Kelly Monaco

Personal details
- Born: May 23, 1976 (age 50) Philadelphia, Pennsylvania U.S.
- Height: 5 ft 3 in (1.60 m)

Kelly Marie Monaco (born May 23, 1976) is an American model, actress, reality television contestant and winner of Dancing with the Stars in Season 1. Since 2003, she has played the character of Sam McCall on General Hospital.

In April 1997, Monaco became the Playboy Playmate of the Month. She made cover appearances in other magazines such as FHM and Maxim. Maxim also awarded her 13th place on their annual Hot 100 List in May 2006.

== May ==
Linn Thomas
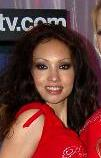

Personal details
- Born: January 21, 1976 (age 50) Newport News, Virginia, U.S.
- Height: 5 ft 7 in (1.70 m)

Lynn Thomas (also known as Linn Thomas) (born January 21, 1976, in Newport News, Virginia) is an American model. Thomas became Playboy's Playmate of the Month for May 1997. In October 2000, she became a Penthouse Pet of the Month, the first model to have appeared in both Playboy and Penthouse as a centerfold. She has also modeled for Perfect 10 and Danni's Hard Drive. In 2003, she appeared in the high-gloss erotic film Temptation, directed by Michael Ninn.

== June ==
Carrie Stevens
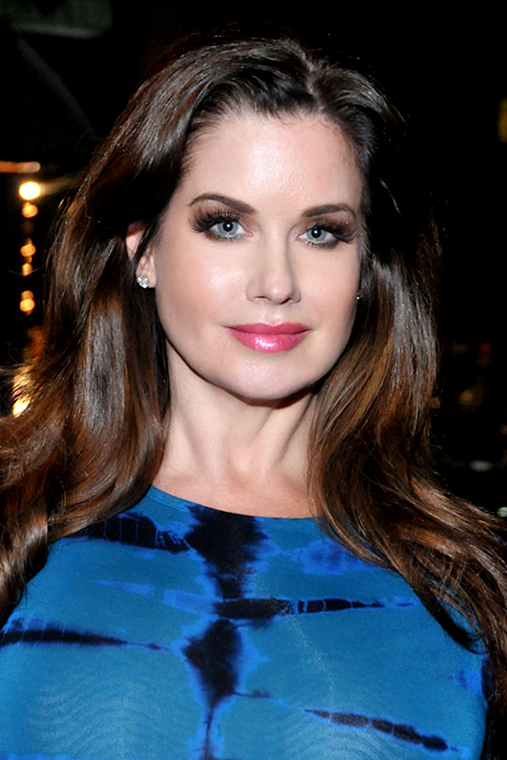
- Stevens in 2014

Personal details
- Born: May 1, 1969 (age 57) Buffalo, New York, U.S.
- Height: 5 ft 6 in (1.68 m)

Carrie Stevens (born May 1, 1969, in Buffalo, New York) is an American model and actress. She is Playboy's Playmate of the Month for June 1997.

== July ==
Daphnée Lynn Duplaix
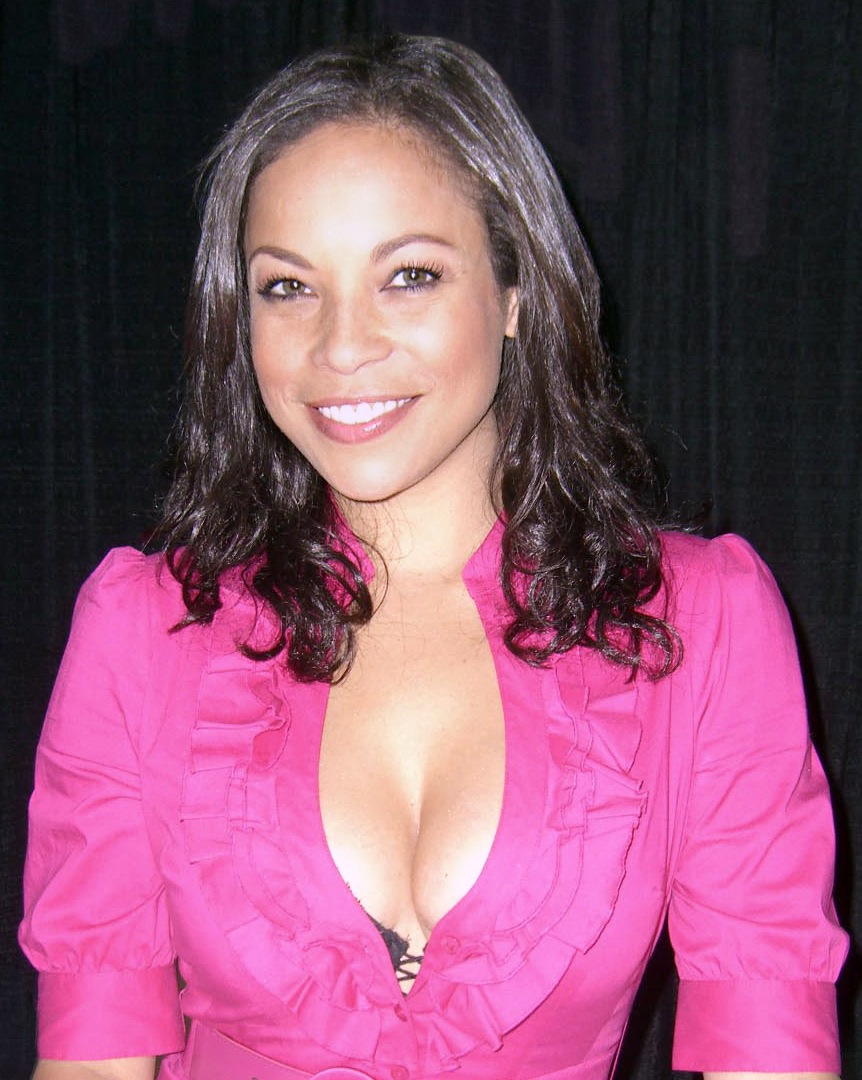
- Duplaix in 2009

Personal details
- Born: August 18, 1976 (age 49) Manhattan, New York, U.S.
- Height: 5 ft 7.5 in (1.715 m)

Daphnée Lynn Duplaix (born August 18, 1976, in Manhattan, New York) is an American actress and model. After appearing in Playboy magazine as its Playmate of the Month for July 1997, she appeared in several Playboy videos. Her Playmate pictorial was photographed by Richard Fegley. She held regular roles on the soap operas One Life to Live and Passions.

== August ==
Kalin Olson

Personal details
- Born: December 29, 1975 (age 50) Hot Springs, Arkansas, U.S.
- Height: 5 ft 7 in (1.70 m)

Kalin Olson (born December 29, 1975, in Hot Springs, Arkansas) is an American glamour model and actress. She is the Playmate of the Month for August 1997. Her centerfold was photographed by Arny Freytag and Stephen Wayda. She has also modelled for Perfect 10 (December 1999). She was married to a professional hockey player, Pascal Trepanier. In 2021, she and her new boyfriend were arrested in her hometown over theft of an American flag.

== September ==
Nikki Ziering
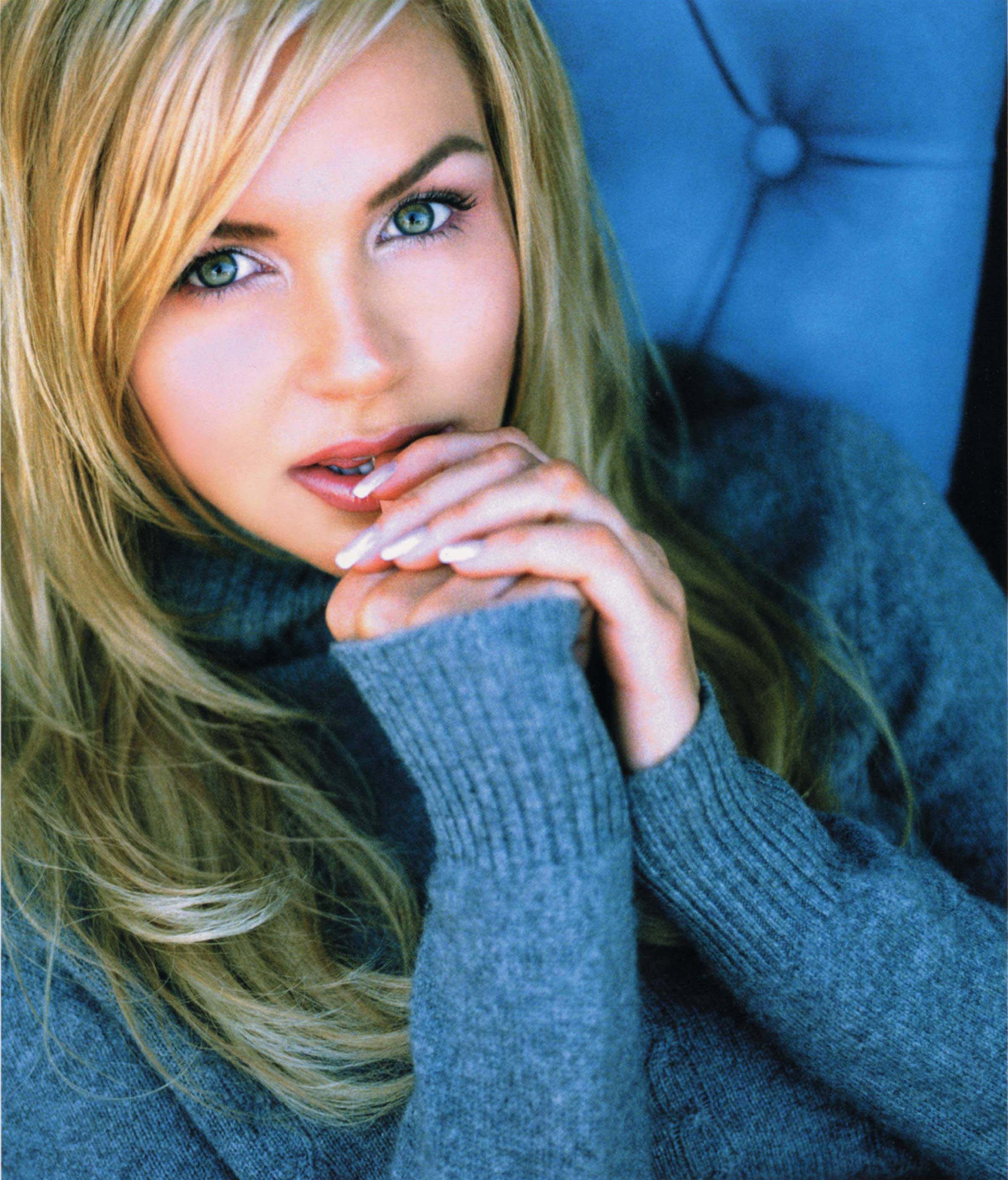

Personal details
- Born: Natalie Schieler; August 9, 1971 (age 54) Norwalk, California, U.S.
- Height: 5 ft 8 in (1.73 m)

Nikki Schieler (born August 9, 1971) is an American model and actress. She is Playboy's Playmate of the Month for September 1997. She appeared on the cover twice, first in August 1997, then in July 2003, along with a feature pictorial. Prior to Playboy, she was a swimwear model usually seen modeling for Venus Swimwear and Frederick's of Hollywood. She also appeared as a Barker's Beauty on the game show The Price Is Right, from 1999 to 2002.

== October ==
Layla Roberts

Personal details
- Born: October 22, 1974 (age 51) Kealakekua, Kona, Hawaii, U.S.
- Height: 5 ft 9.5 in (1.77 m)

Layla Harvest Roberts (born October 22, 1974) is an American model and actress. She is Playboy magazine's Playmate of the Month for October 1997. Her centerfold was photographed by Stephen Wayda. Roberts had a minor role as the stripper Molly Mounds in the 1998 film Armageddon.

== November ==
Inga Drozdova

Personal details
- Born: December 14, 1975 (age 50) Latvia
- Height: 5 ft 8 in (1.73 m)

Inga Drozdova (born December 14, 1975, Latvia) is a model and actress. She is Playboy's Playmate of the Month for November 1997 and has appeared in Playboy videos.

== December ==
Karen McDougal
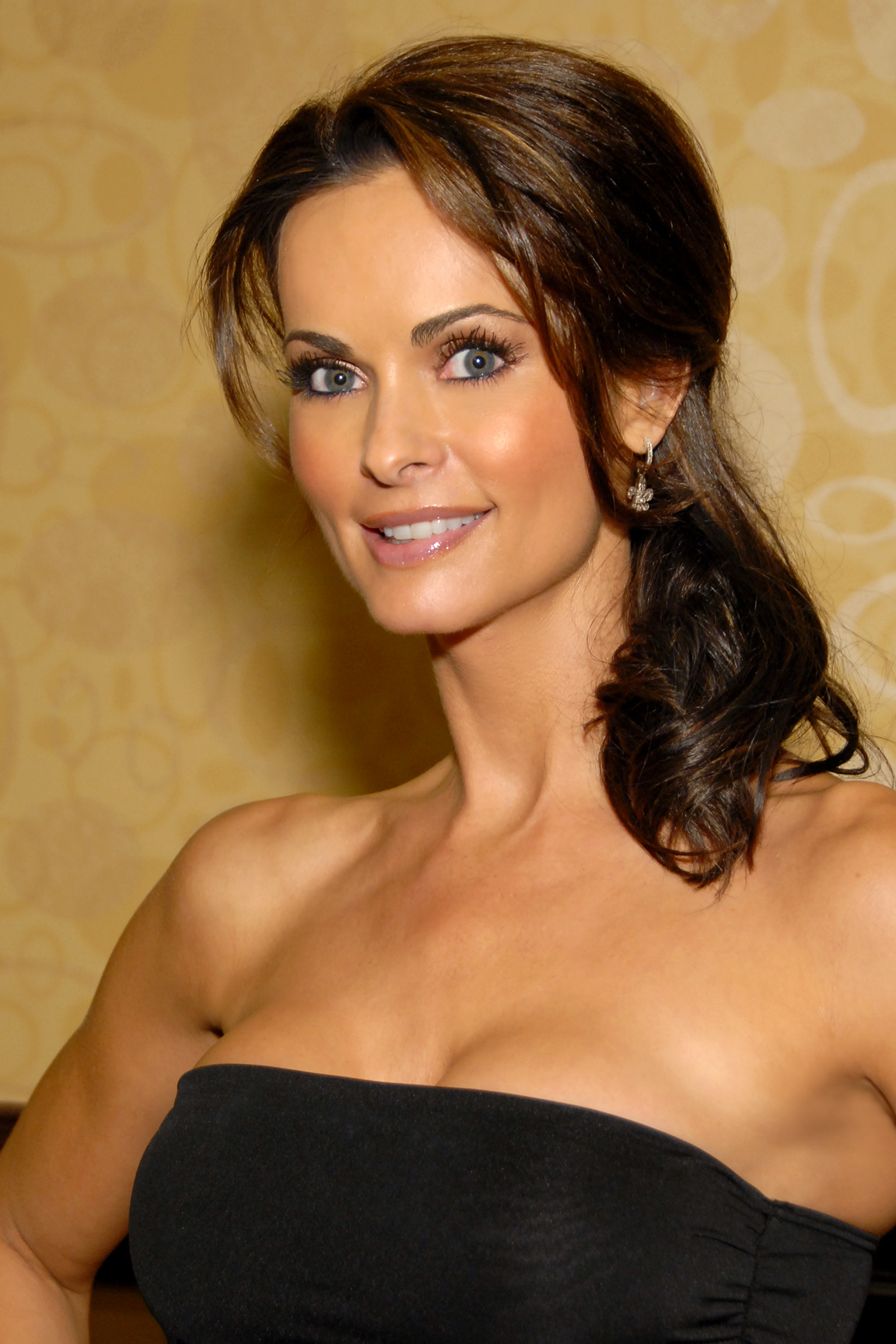
- McDougal in 2011

Playboy Playmate of the Year
- 1998
- Preceded by: Victoria Silvstedt
- Succeeded by: Heather Kozar

Personal details
- Born: March 23, 1971 (age 55) Merrillville, Indiana, U.S.
- Height: 5 ft 8 in (1.73 m)

Karen McDougal (born March 23, 1971) is an American model and actress. She is Playboy magazine's Playmate of the Month for December 1997 and Playmate of the Year for 1998.

McDougal taught pre-kindergarten before winning a swimsuit competition and beginning her career as a model. As a fitness model, she was the first woman to appear on the cover of Men's Fitness magazine. She starred in The Arena, a direct-to-video film. She is an avid motorcycle and car collector. She later became involved in a political scandal involving hush money over an extramarital affair with businessman and then-future U.S. President, Donald Trump.

== See also ==
- List of people in Playboy 1990–1999

Jami Ferrell	Kimber West	Jennifer Miriam	Kelly Monaco	Lynn Thomas	Carrie Stevens
Daphnée Duplaix	Kalin Olson	Nikki Ziering	Layla Roberts	Inga Drozdova	Karen McDougal
