= Pascal Trépanier =

Canadian ice hockey player

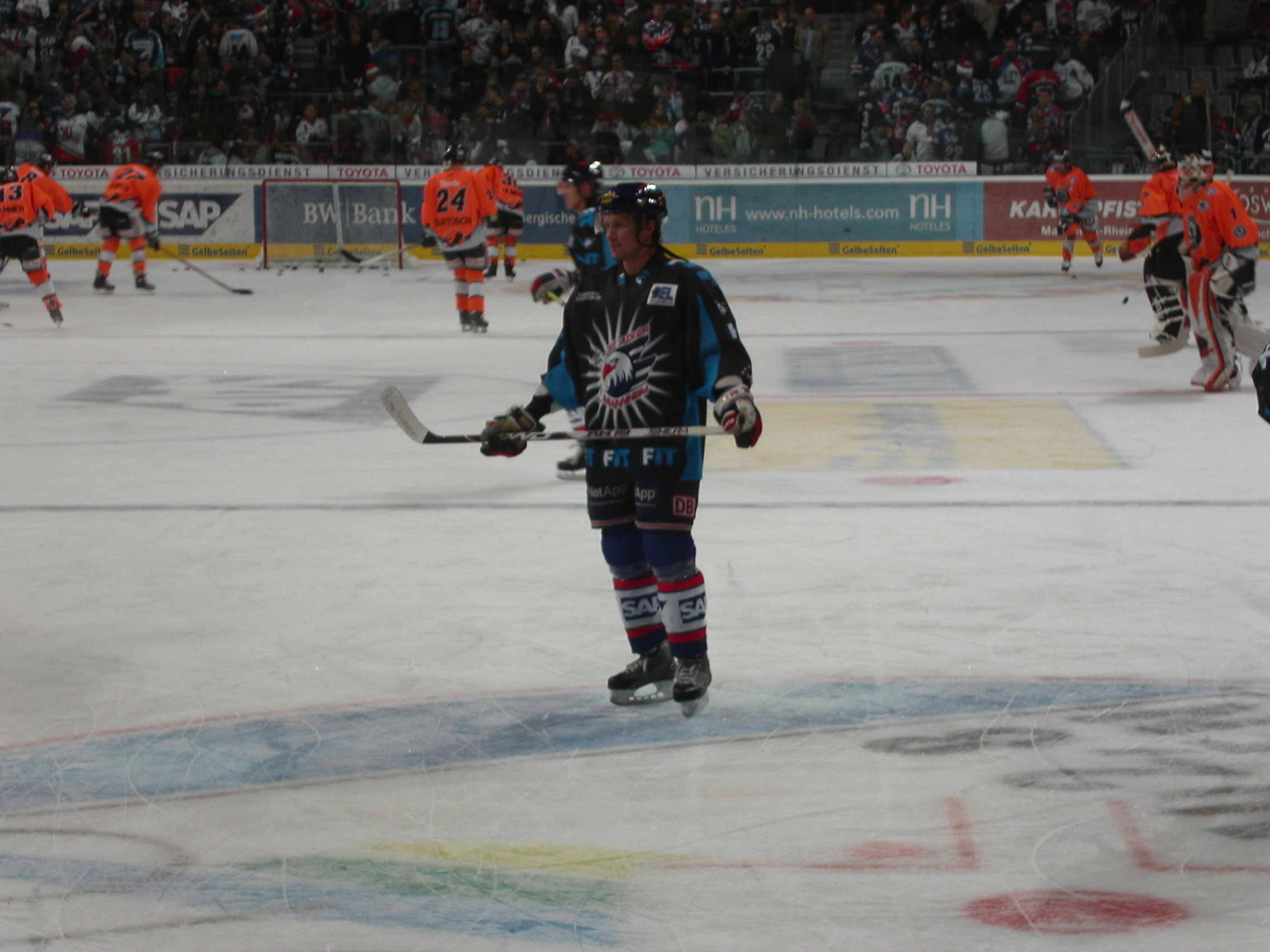
- Born: September 4, 1973 (age 52) Gaspé, Quebec, Canada
- Height: 6 ft 0 in (183 cm)
- Weight: 205 lb (93 kg; 14 st 9 lb)
- Position: Defence
- Shot: Right
- Played for: Colorado Avalanche; Mighty Ducks of Anaheim; Nashville Predators; Nürnberg Ice Tigers; SC Bern; Adler Mannheim; Krefeld Pinguine
- NHL draft: Undrafted
- Playing career: 1994–2012

Pascal Trépanier (born September 4, 1973) is a Canadian former professional ice hockey defenceman who played in the National Hockey League with the Colorado Avalanche, Mighty Ducks of Anaheim and the Nashville Predators. He finished his 18-year career with Krefeld Pinguine of the Deutsche Eishockey Liga in Germany.

== Playing career ==
Undrafted, Trepanier played in the National Hockey League for the Colorado Avalanche, Mighty Ducks of Anaheim, and the Nashville Predators, appearing in 229 regular season games, scoring 12 goals and 22 assists for 34 points, picking up 252 total penalty minutes between 1998 and 2002.

After spending the entire 2003–04 season in the AHL with the Hershey Bears, Trepanier left North America to sign in Germany with Nürnberg Ice Tigers of the Deutsche Eishockey Liga during the 2004 NHL Lockout. Pascal remained in Europe and played in the Swiss NLA with SC Bern the following season before returning to the DEL with Adler Mannheim. Trepanier established himself within the German league as one of the premier offensive defenseman, topscoring for the Eagles defense in three consecutive seasons.

After the 2009–10 campaign, his fourth with Adler Mannheim, Pascal left as a free agent and signed a one-year contract with fellow DEL club, Krefeld Pinguine, on July 27, 2010.

On March 20, 2012, Trepanier announced his retirement after 18 professional seasons.

== Personal life ==
He is married to Playboy Playmate Miss August 1997 Kalin Olson.

Trépanier is the nephew of former Montreal Canadiens forward and head coach Mario Tremblay.

== Career statistics ==
=== Regular season and playoffs ===
			Regular season					Playoffs
Season	Team	League	GP	G	A	Pts	PIM	GP	G	A	Pts	PIM
1990–91	Hull Olympiques	QMJHL	46	3	3	6	56	4	0	2	2	7
1991–92	Trois-Rivières Draveurs	QMJHL	53	4	18	22	125	15	3	5	8	21
1992–93	Sherbrooke Faucons	QMJHL	59	15	33	48	130	15	5	7	12	36
1993–94	Sherbrooke Faucons	QMJHL	48	16	41	57	67	12	1	8	9	14
1994–95	Dayton Bombers	ECHL	36	16	28	44	133	9	2	4	6	20
1994–95	Kalamazoo Wings	IHL	14	1	2	3	47	—	—	—	—	—
1994–95	Cornwall Aces	AHL	4	0	0	0	9	14	2	7	9	32
1995–96	Cornwall Aces	AHL	70	13	20	33	142	8	1	2	3	24
1996–97	Hershey Bears	AHL	73	14	39	53	151	23	6	13	19	59
1997–98	Hershey Bears	AHL	43	13	18	31	105	7	4	2	6	8
1997–98	Colorado Avalanche	NHL	15	0	1	1	18	—	—	—	—	—
1998–99	Mighty Ducks of Anaheim	NHL	45	2	4	6	48	—	—	—	—	—
1999–00	Mighty Ducks of Anaheim	NHL	37	0	4	4	54	—	—	—	—	—
2000–01	Mighty Ducks of Anaheim	NHL	57	6	4	10	73	—	—	—	—	—
2001–02	Colorado Avalanche	NHL	74	4	9	13	59	2	0	0	0	0
2002–03	Nashville Predators	NHL	1	0	0	0	0	—	—	—	—	—
2002–03	Milwaukee Admirals	AHL	52	9	15	24	33	—	—	—	—	—
2002–03	San Antonio Rampage	AHL	12	4	6	10	10	2	0	0	0	2
2003–04	Hershey Bears	AHL	75	11	33	44	53	—	—	—	—	—
2004–05	Nürnberg Ice Tigers	DEL	52	15	39	54	66	6	3	1	4	6
2005–06	SC Bern	NLA	41	4	15	19	66	5	1	1	2	8
2005–06	EHC Biel	NLB	—	—	—	—	—	8	1	7	8	8
2006–07	Adler Mannheim	DEL	51	15	21	36	87	11	4	2	6	20
2007–08	Adler Mannheim	DEL	55	15	25	40	30	5	3	3	6	2
2008–09	Adler Mannheim	DEL	49	7	19	26	69	9	1	4	5	6
2009–10	Adler Mannheim	DEL	51	10	13	23	55	2	0	0	0	2
2010–11	Krefeld Pinguine	DEL	49	5	14	19	59	8	1	3	4	10
2011–12	Krefeld Pinguine	DEL	52	4	13	17	85	—	—	—	—	—
NHL totals			229	12	22	34	252	2	0	0	0	0
