= Sam's Game =

- Starring: Sam Simon
- Country of origin: United States

Production
- Running time: 55 mins

Original release
- Network: Playboy TV
- Release: June 11, 2009

Sam's Game was a celebrity poker program on Playboy TV. It featured a line-up of comedians, Playmates, and professional Texas Hold 'Em players, and it was hosted by Simpsons' co-developer, Sam Simon.

== Format ==
Shot at Hugh Hefner's private sky villa at the Palms Resort, the show featured celebrities playing traditional Texas Hold 'Em with their own actual money, as opposed to charity contributions.

Women in Playboy bunny costumes served as the card dealers and cocktail waitresses. A variety of comedians, actresses, professional card players, and ex-Playmates made up the rotating table of players, with Sam Simon, Norm Macdonald and Jennifer Tilly being the only constants.

== Featured players ==
- Norm Macdonald
- Artie Lange
- Brande Roderick
- Dave Attell
- Jennifer Tilly
- Jeff Ross
- Deanna Brooks
- Andrea Lowell
- Phil Laak
- Jay Kogen
- Ralph Cirella
