= Animation Writers Caucus Animation Writing Award =

Annual award given to a member of the Writers Guild of America, West

The Animation Writers Caucus Animation Writing Award is a special award given to a member of the Writers Guild of America, West, who, in the opinion of the Board of Directors, has advanced the literature of animation in film and/or television through the years and who has made outstanding contributions to the profession of the animation writer.

== Recipients ==
| Year | Person(s) |
|---|---|
| 1998 | Gordon Bressack |
| 1999 | Paul Dini |
| 2000 | Christy Marx |
| 2001 | Alan Burnett |
| 2002 | Patric Verrone |
| 2003 | Mark Evanier |
| 2004 | Jack Mendelsohn |
| 2005 | Al Jean and Mike Reiss |
| 2006 | Jules Feiffer |
| 2007 | Brad Bird |
| 2008 | Linda Woolverton |
| 2009 | Stan Berkowitz |
| 2010 | Mike Scully |
| 2011 | Dwayne McDuffie and Earl Kress (both posthumously) |
| 2012 | Matt Groening |
| 2013 | Sam Simon |
| 2014 | Len Uhley |
| 2015 | Seth MacFarlane |
| 2016 | Mike Judge |
| 2017 | Len Wein (posthumously) |
| 2018 | Nicole Dubuc |
| 2019 | David N. Weiss |
| 2020 | Craig Miller |
| 2021 | No award given |
| 2022 | Mark McCorkle and Bob Schooley |
| 2023 | No award |
| 2024 | No award |
| 2025 | No award |
| 2026 | No award |
