= Who Killed the Robins Family? =

1983 novel by Thomas Chastain

Who Killed the Robins Family? is a mystery/contest novel created by Bill Adler and written by Thomas Chastain. The first edition (ISBN 0-688-02171-9) was published in hardcover format by William Morrow in 1983. Warner Books published the paperback edition in 1984 (ISBN 0-446-32314-4).

== Plot summary ==
Who Killed the Robins Family? is a mystery novel in which all eight members of the Robins family are murdered or disappear throughout the story. The hardcover book provided no solutions to the murders. The books were also a contest where the person who provided the best answers to who, when, where, how, and why each murder happened won $10,000. The paperback version, released after the contest ended, revealed the answers to all the questions.

Most chapters revolved around the death of a Robins family member, though one chapter contained a murder and a disappearance, and two others involved a disappearance. Most chapters contained all the needed information to provide all five answers regarding each death, though some gave only a hint as to an answer. However, if properly understood, it only took a bit of minor research to obtain the complete answer.

The murders ranged from a classic locked-room puzzle to death by strangulation. The book also gives homage to several classic works of mystery and suspense.

As the book is a contest, liberties are taken with proper police investigation of the crimes, which would have resulted in an immediate solution. For example, when one family member is shot to death in a darkened room, nobody thinks to check for gunshot residue. In addition, while some murders have fit very neatly with the facts on a theoretical basis, the method of implementation has questionable realism.

== Characters in "Who Killed the Robins Family?" ==
- Tyler Robins
- Evelyn Robins
- Marshall Robins
- Lewis Robins
- James Robins
- Libby Robins Pittman
- Candace Robins
- Cynthia Robins

== Reception ==
Kirkus Reviews lambasted it as a "flat, brief quasi-novel" with a "colorless, all-plot format", "heavyhanded red herrings", and a "short but listless narrative".

== Winners ==
The contest was won by a group of eight friends from Denver, who solved the mystery at a party.

== Awards and honours ==
Who Killed the Robins Family? topped The New York Times Fiction Best Sellers of 1984 in January 1984.
