= Thomas Chastain =

American novelist

- Born: January 17, 1921
- Died: September 1, 1994 (aged 73); Manhattan, New York City
- Citizenship: USA
- Writing career
- Pen name: Nick Carter; Thomas Chastain, Jr.
- Genre: Crime fiction
- Notable work: Who Killed the Robins Family?

Thomas Chastain (January 17, 1921 – September 1, 1994) was an American author of crime fiction. He is best known for his bestseller Who Killed the Robins Family? And Where and When and Why and How Did They Die? as well as the sequel to that work. He served as the president of Mystery Writers of America in 1989. He was also known as Nick Carter and Thomas Chastain Jr.

== Career ==
Chastain was born in Canada but grew up in the south of the United States. He attended Johns Hopkins University and worked in Baltimore, Maryland, and New York City writing copy for newspapers, magazines and advertising.

Chastain has worked as an author of crime fiction and mystery since his first work, Judgment Day, was published in 1962. He became a novelist full-time in 1974. Before the success of those novels, Chastain wrote a series of crime novels featuring Max Kauffman the Deputy Chief Inspector for New York City.

His most well known work, Who Killed the Robins Family? And Where and When and Why and How Did They Die? (1983), was a mystery novel about the murder of a wealthy cosmetics firm owning family, in which the solution to the mystery was not revealed. Readers were to guess who had committed the crimes and submit their guesses to the publisher. The first reader to guess correctly received a cash prize. Four married couples from Denver answered 39 of the 40 questions in the book correctly and won the $10,000 prize. The book sold over 1 million copies and was top of the New York Times best-seller in January 1984. A sequel entitled The Revenge of the Robins Family (1984) was released; while not as successful it also sold well.

He served as the president of Mystery Writers of America in 1989. Chastain authored several other novels including Pandora's Box (1974), Where the Truth Lies (1988) with Helen Hayes and The Prosecutor (1992). Over the course of his career he also worked as a newspaper reporter and editor. He co-wrote (with Sam Simon) the story of The Simpsons episode "Black Widower".

Chastain died September 1, 1994, aged 73, from lung cancer at Lenox Hill Hospital in Manhattan. He was married to Louise until his death and had a brother and a sister.

== Selected bibliography ==
- Judgment Day (1962)
- Death Walk (1971)
- Assassination Brigade (under the pseudonym Nick Carter) (1974)
- Pandora's Box (1974)
- 911 (1976)
- Vital Statistics (1977)
- High Voltage (1979)
- The Diamond Exchange (1981)
- Nightscape (1982)
- Who Killed the Robins Family? And Where and When and Why and How Did They Die? (1983)
- Where The Truth Lies (1988)
- Perry Mason in the Case of Too Many Murders (1989)
- Perry Mason in the Case of the Burning Bequest (1990)
- The Prosecutor (1992)

== Sources ==
- Contemporary Authors Online, Gale, 2009. Reproduced in Biography Resource Center. Farmington Hills, Mich.: Gale, 2009. http://galenet.galegroup.com/servlet/BioRC
- "Thomas Chastain." St. James Guide to Crime & Mystery Writers, 4th ed. St. James Press, 1996.

Reproduced in Biography Resource Center. Farmington Hills, Mich.: Gale, 2009. http://galenet.galegroup.com/servlet/BioRC
