= Million Dollar Abie =

- The Simpsons episode
- Episode no.: Season 17; Episode 16
- Directed by: Steven Dean Moore
- Written by: Tim Long
- Production code: HABF09
- Original air date: April 2, 2006

Guest appearances
- Rob Reiner as himself; Michael Carrington as Jock Center Host #2

Episode features
- Chalkboard gag: "I will not flip the classroom upside down" (The classroom is upside down)
- Couch gag: The Simpsons sit down on the couch as normal. A TiVo menu pops up, asking the viewer if he would like to save the recording or delete it. "Delete This Recording" is chosen and the screen goes black.
- Commentary: Al Jean; Tim Long; Matt Selman; Carolyn Omine; Michael Price; Tom Gammill; Max Pross; Steven Dean Moore

Episode chronology
← Previous "Homer Simpson, This Is Your Wife"	Next → "Kiss Kiss, Bang Bangalore"
- The Simpsons season 17

"Million Dollar Abie" is the sixteenth episode of the seventeenth season of the American animated television series The Simpsons. It was originally aired on the Fox network in the United States on April 2, 2006. The episode was written by Tim Long and directed by Steven Dean Moore. This is the first episode to have a parody title of the film Million Dollar Baby, with the second being "Million Dollar Maybe" in season 21.

In this episode, Grampa attempts suicide after angering the town and becomes a matador when the procedure is stopped. Actor and director Rob Reiner appeared as himself. The episode received mixed reviews.

== Plot ==
The commissioner of pro football, Bud Armstrong, announces plans to expand the league, and Homer leads the charge to get a new franchise in Springfield. Homer puts forth a strong package for the team and the new stadium. The owners award Springfield the new team, named the Springfield Meltdowns. The town quickly builds Homer's new stadium, changes the street names to football-related names and repaints the town in the team's colors. When Armstrong comes to Springfield to announce the new team, he gets confused by the new street names. He stops for directions at the Simpsons' house and is greeted by Grampa, who welcomes him in as he is watching Maggie. However, Grampa is watching a television program about burglars who act as the commissioner did, so he knocks Armstrong unconscious. The rest of the family arrives home and finds him tied up. The commissioner declares that neither he nor the league will ever return to Springfield.

Homer and the rest of the town becomes furious with Grampa for his actions. Grampa is depressed and seeks assisted suicide. The doctor tells Grampa to reconsider before following through with it. After waiting twenty-four hours with no one phoning him, Grampa goes back to the clinic the next day. To make it a more peaceful experience, they project in front of him, at his request, hippies being beaten by police while music from the Glenn Miller Orchestra plays. Grampa nearly dies, but Chief Wiggum ends the procedure, telling the doctor that voters have overturned Springfield's assisted-suicide law. Grampa thinks he is dead and runs through town without fear. He soon learns he is not dead and decides to live without fear. Meanwhile, the city turns the unused football stadium into an arena for bullfighting despite Lisa's protests. Grampa decides to become a matador.

Grampa wins his first bullfight, but Lisa wants him to stop hurting and killing animals. Grampa says that people are cheering his success, but Lisa says she has always cheered for him until now. In the next fight, he sees the bull that he is about to kill and spares its life. He releases all the bulls, which immediately start running through the streets of Springfield, causing destruction and injuring everyone. Lisa is proud of Grampa, and the two reconcile in two floating chairs tied to balloons, but they both are in danger by two bulls flying with balloons.

== Production ==
This episode had its script finalized on June 22, 2005. The first act of the storyboard was rough drafted on July 6, 2005, and it was revised on July 12. The second act's storyboard was roughed on July 11, 2005.

Actor and director Rob Reiner appeared as himself.

== Cultural references ==
In the "Springfield Blows" music video, Freddy Krueger from the A Nightmare on Elm Street film franchise is seen.

The euthanasia machine, the "diePod", is named after the iPod media player and bears a physical resemblance to it.

The scene where Grandpa seeks assisted suicide is also a reference to the scene in the film Soylent Green where the character played by Edward G. Robinson seeks a similar fate.

== Reception ==
=== Viewing figures ===
The episode earned a 2.4 rating and was watched by 7.84 million viewers, the 51st most-watched show that week.

=== Critical response ===
Adam Finley of TV Squad liked the jokes and the scene where Grampa kills the bull. His favorite moments were when the bulls were floating and when the firemen threw Grampa into a burning building.

Colin Jacobson of DVD Movie Guide thought it was not funny to discuss the ethics of bullfighting. He also noticed that it was another episode discussing suicide after the episode "We're on the Road to D'ohwhere" earlier in the season.

On Four Finger Discount, Guy Davis and Brendan Dando did not like the episode, calling it "sad and depressing" to feature Grampa attempting suicide and killing a bull.
