= Homer's Paternity Coot =

- The Simpsons episode
- Episode no.: Season 17; Episode 10
- Directed by: Mike B. Anderson
- Written by: Joel H. Cohen
- Production code: HABF03
- Original air date: January 8, 2006

Guest appearances
- Joe Frazier as himself; William H. Macy as himself; Michael York as Mason Fairbanks

Episode features
- Chalkboard gag: "I am not smarter than the President"
- Couch gag: A photographer comes in and takes a series of family photos: the family is normal in 2006 and 2007, Homer dies in 2008, Marge marries Lenny in 2009, Marge leaves and Lenny and Carl in charge of taking care of the kids in 2010, Lenny and Carl are gone, Marge returns and is now married to Jimbo Jones in 2011, Jimbo Jones is gone and Homer returns as a robot in 2012, and all of the Simpsons are now robots in 2013.
- Commentary: Matt Groening; Al Jean; Joel H. Cohen; Matt Selman; Dana Gould; Michael York; Mike B. Anderson; Mike Marcantel; David Silverman

Episode chronology
← Previous "Simpsons Christmas Stories"	Next → "We're on the Road to D'ohwhere"
- The Simpsons season 17

"Homer's Paternity Coot" is the tenth episode of the seventeenth season of the American animated television series The Simpsons. It first aired on the Fox network in the United States on January 8, 2006. The episode was written by Joel H. Cohen and directed by Mike B. Anderson.

In this episode, mail from forty years earlier is discovered, and a letter from Homer's mother's old boyfriend states that he is Homer's true father. Homer sets out to find his supposed new father, leaving Grampa behind. The episode guest stars William H. Macy and Joe Frazier as themselves, and Michael York as Homer's new father, Mason Fairbanks. The episode received mixed reviews.

== Plot ==
As Marge drives on a highway, she finds a toll booth, but she and other Springfield residents drive through an adjacent forest trail to avoid paying. A week later, Mayor Quimby deploys tire spikes and blocks off the escape route. When Marge comes to the booth, she refuses to pay and backs up, blowing out many cars' tires, which are thrown into the Springfield tire fire. The heat and smoke from it melt ice on Mount Springfield and reveal a mailman frozen for forty years. One of his letters is delivered to Homer's mother, Mona. It is from her old lifeguard boyfriend, whose name begins with an M, who writes that if Mona replies to the letter, she has chosen him, and if she does not, she is choosing to stay with her husband, Grampa, but he believes the baby she is carrying is his.

Wondering who his biological father is, Homer goes to the library to look in Lifeguards of Springfield in the Twentieth Century. The only person in there whose name begins with M is Mason Fairbanks. Homer goes to his house posing as a reporter, but eventually tells him he thinks he is his father, and Mason is delighted. He takes the Simpson family on a ride on his ship and tells them the story of the lost emerald treasure of Piso Mojado, which impresses them. However, when they invite Mason home for dinner, Grampa accuses him of having tried to steal his wife and now trying to steal his family and is saddened Homer would think that Mason could be his real father. They take a DNA paternity test, and Homer is thrilled to learn his real father is Mason.

Later, while Marge, Bart, Lisa and Maggie have an awkward visit with Grampa, Mason and Homer are underwater in individual submarines salvaging the lost treasure. Homer gets separated from Mason, and he follows a small light from a glowing fish, thinking it is him, and gets stuck in coral. As his oxygen runs out and he loses consciousness, he sees flashbacks of himself and Grampa. After being rescued and spending three days in a coma, Homer wakes up in a hospital and says he considers Grampa to be his real father. Grampa reveals he switched the labels on the DNA samples after seeing how happy Homer was with Mason, and the duo share a hug.

== Production ==
Michael York guest starred as Mason Fairbanks. Actor William H. Macy and boxer Joe Frazier appeared as themselves. Frazier previously appeared in the third season episode "Brother, Can You Spare Two Dimes?".

== Reception ==
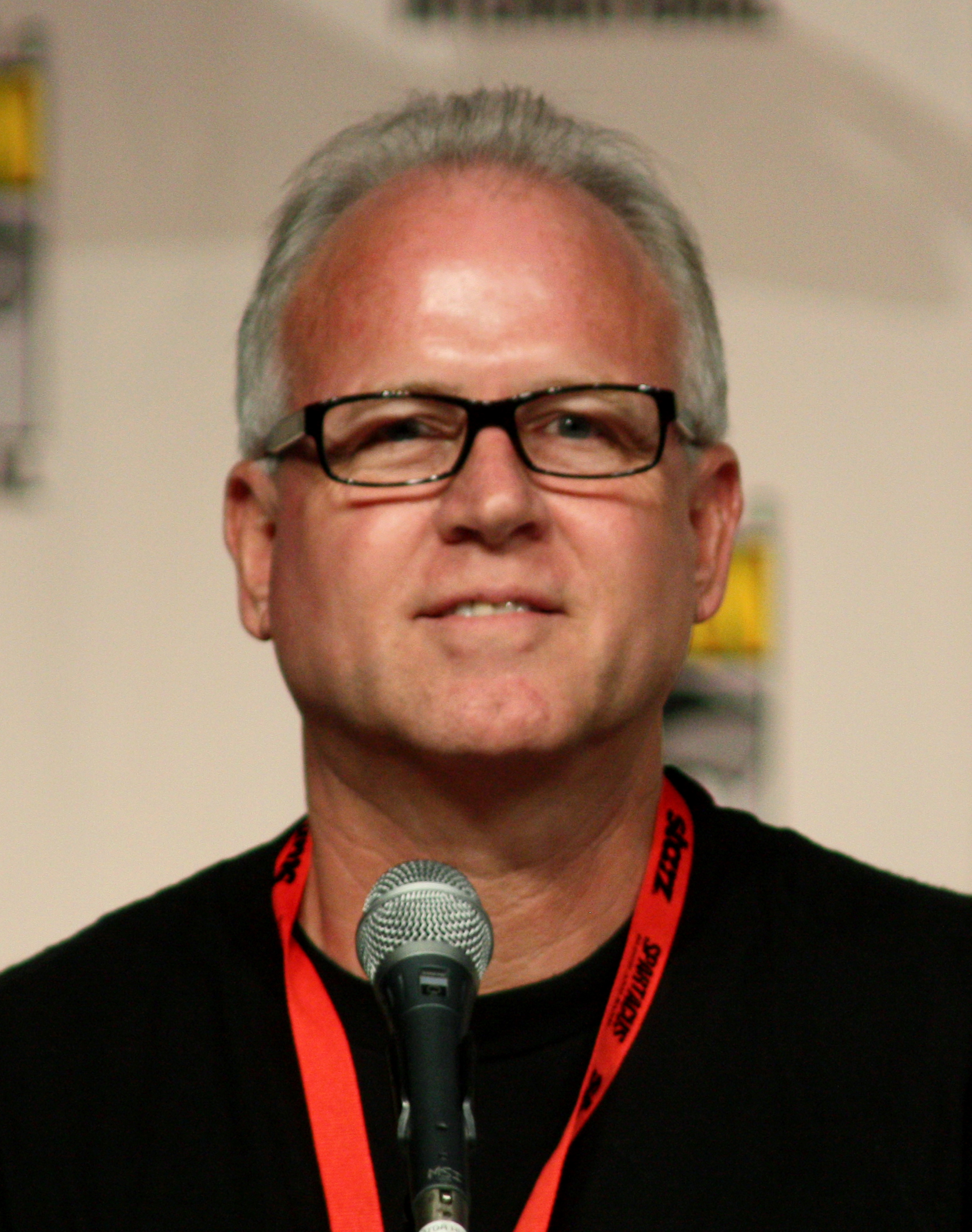
Mike B. Anderson (pictured) directed the episode.

=== Viewing figures ===
The episode was watched by 10.11 million viewers, which was the 39th most-watched show that week.

=== Critical response ===
Brendan Dando and Guy Davis of the podcast Four Finger Discount gave the episode a positive review, particularly Michael York's performance as Mason Fairbanks.

Ryan J. Budke of TV Squad gave the episode a strong positive rating, citing its ingenuity and charm. He called it a funny episode with a lot of heart, and said that it was a great episode by comparing it alongside another one of his favorites, "The Girl Who Slept Too Little".

Colin Jacobson of DVD Movie Guide said the episode was "heavy on concept and light on execution." He said it seems the writer did not know what to do with the premise after they thought of it.

== Titan submersible incident "prediction" ==
In June 2023, it was alleged that Homer's near death experience in the episode while on board a submarine predicted the Titan submersible implosion which involved the deaths of five tourists who were set to visit the Titanic wreckage while onboard OceanGate's Titan submarine. Simpsons writer and former showrunner Mike Reiss openly acknowledged that he had ridden on the same submarine and also claimed he had concerns about its technical issues.
