= The Bonfire of the Manatees =

- The Simpsons episode
- Episode no.: Season 17; Episode 1
- Directed by: Mark Kirkland
- Written by: Dan Greaney
- Production code: GABF18
- Original air date: September 11, 2005

Guest appearances
- Alec Baldwin as Caleb Thorn; Joe Mantegna as Fat Tony

Episode features
- Chalkboard gag: "Does any kid still do this anymore?"
- Couch gag: Marge, Lisa, Bart and Maggie go through a metal detector safely, but Homer sets it off. After three attempts (and removing all but his underwear), Homer is then searched with a scanning wand by a security guard.
- Commentary: Al Jean; David Silverman; Mark Kirkland; Nancy Kruse; Matt Selman; Dan Greaney; Tom Gammill; Max Pross

Episode chronology
← Previous "The Father, the Son, and the Holy Guest Star"	Next → "The Girl Who Slept Too Little"
- The Simpsons season 17

"The Bonfire of the Manatees" is the first episode of the seventeenth season of the American animated television series The Simpsons. It originally aired on the Fox network in the United States on September 11, 2005, making it the first Simpsons season premiere to air in September since the eleventh season opened with "Beyond Blunderdome" on September 26, 1999. The episode was written by Dan Greaney and directed by Mark Kirkland.

In this episode, Marge leaves Homer to save manatees after he is forced to use the house to film pornography. Alec Baldwin guest starred as Caleb Thorn. In its original broadcast, it was watched by 11.1 million viewers and received mixed reviews.

== Plot ==
Homer gets into trouble with the local mob over football gambling debts. As compensation, Fat Tony wants to use the Simpson home for shooting the adult film Lemony Lick-It's A Series of Horny Events, with the participation of Carl and Lenny. Homer gets Marge and the children to leave the house by sending them off to "Santa's Village", a Christmas-themed amusement park that proves to be lackluster. Marge, Bart, Lisa and Maggie return home to find the production is still underway. Marge, outraged by Homer's latest bit of idiocy, leaves. Homer, home alone with the kids, tries to figure out what to do next.

Just as Marge is about ready to reconcile with Homer (though she flatly expresses that she is not interested in his gift of Kwik-E-Mart chocolates, half of which have "test bites"), she encounters Dr. Caleb Thorn, a good-looking scientist with a passion for saving the endangered manatee. Homer and the kids go on a quest to find Marge, and they stop and stay with their "country cousins" (their dog is Santa's Little Helper's brother). Meanwhile, Marge is finding herself while helping to save manatees. Caleb helps Marge realize that Homer is still the man she fell in love with, and the problem is that she still expects him to change.

Homer decides to win Marge back by saving a herd of manatees from a gang of abusing jet skiers. The gang initially agreed to leave, but return after hearing Homer calling them 'rubes'. He attempts to organize the manatees to battle the gang, but they all flee. However, the gang is dispersed when Homer's country cousin shows up with a notarized court order to have all jet skiers vacate the waters at once. Despite Homer's failure, Marge is impressed by his efforts to save the manatees and declares she is taking home "the real endangered species": "a devoted husband". The family decides to take a mini-vacation, and Homer gets a manatee sent to the power plant to fill in for his job for the next few days. After Mr. Burns discovers the manatee, Smithers tells him that the manatee is about to die of dehydration, Mr. Burns and Smithers help him by washing him like a car, which the manatee actually enjoys.

== Production ==
When the writers were discussing ideas for The Simpsons Movie in 2003, Al Jean suggested the idea of Marge leaving Homer to rescue manatees after Homer accidentally rents the house to film pornography. While the idea was rejected for the film, it was adapted into the script for this episode. Former writer of The Simpsons, Brent Forrester, suggested the title "The Bonfire of the Manatees" to Greaney, who accepted it.

Alec Baldwin guest starred as Caleb Thorn. Baldwin previously appeared as himself in the tenth season episode "When You Dish Upon a Star".

== Conspiracy theory ==
In 2014, the episode was noted for having predicted the matchup for Super Bowl XLVIII between the Denver Broncos and the Seattle Seahawks.

== Reception ==
=== Viewing figures ===
The episode earned a 4.0 rating and was watch by 11.1 million viewers, which was the ninth most-watched show that week.

=== Critical response ===
Colin Jacobson of DVD Movie Guide said that the episode was a repeat of previous themes, but “[s]ome of this veers toward self-parody.”

On Four Finger Discount, Guy Davis and Brendan Dando thought the beginning of the episode with the pornography was “quite fun” but the remainder of the story of Homer and Marge fighting was a repeat of previous episodes.

In September 2008, Entertainment Weekly named Alec Baldwin's role as Caleb Thorn as one of 16 great guest stars on The Simpsons.

=== Awards and nominations ===
At the 16th Environmental Media Awards, this episode won the award for Television Episodic Comedy.
