= The Simpsons season 17 =

Season of a television series

The Simpsons
- Season 17
- DVD cover featuring Sideshow Bob
- Showrunner: Al Jean
- No. of episodes: 22

Release
- Original network: Fox
- Original release: September 11, 2005 – May 21, 2006

Season chronology
- ← Previous; Season 16 Next → Season 18

The seventeenth season of the American animated sitcom The Simpsons aired on Fox between September 11, 2005, and May 21, 2006. The season was produced by Gracie Films and 20th Century Fox Television. Executive producer Al Jean remained the showrunner. Work from this season won two Emmy Awards, was nominated for six Writers Guild of America Awards, winning one, and won an Annie Award.

It broke Fox's tradition of pushing its shows' season premieres back to November to accommodate the Major League Baseball games airing on the network during September and October of each year. Season 17 was released on DVD and Blu-ray in Region 1 on December 2, 2014, Region 2 on December 1, 2014, and Region 4 on December 3, 2014.

== Voice cast & characters ==
=== Main cast ===
- Dan Castellaneta as Homer Simpson, Snowball II, Groundskeeper Willie, Santa's Little Helper, Krusty the Clown, Kodos, Barney Gumble, Blue-Haired Lawyer, Mayor Quimby, Sideshow Mel, Hans Moleman, Grampa Simpson, Rich Texan, Squeaky-Voiced Teen, Rabbi Krustofsky, Mr. Teeny, Itchy, Gil Gunderson, Benjamin and various others
- Julie Kavner as Marge Simpson, Selma Bouvier, and Patty Bouvier
- Nancy Cartwright as Bart Simpson, Nelson Muntz, Ralph Wiggum, Kearney Zzyzwicz, Todd Flanders, Database and various others
- Yeardley Smith as Lisa Simpson
- Hank Azaria as Johnny Tightlips, Moe Szyslak, Carl Carlson, Dr. Nick Riviera, Chief Wiggum, Lou, Kirk Van Houten, Wiseguy, Comic Book Guy, Apu Nahasapeemapetilon, Old Jewish Man, Disco Stu, Professor Frink, Superintendent Chalmers, Cletus Spuckler, Drederick Tatum, Luigi Risotto, Snake, State Comptroller Atkins, Coach Krupt, Bumblebee Man, Doug, Sea Captain, Duffman and various others
- Harry Shearer as Lenny Leonard, Mr. Burns, Waylon Smithers, Ned Flanders, Kent Brockman, Eddie, Scratchy, Reverend Lovejoy, Dr. Hibbert, Kang, Principal Skinner, Dr. J. Loren Pryor, Otto Mann, Dewey Largo, Rainier Wolfcastle, Jasper Beardsley, Judge Snyder and various others

=== Supporting cast ===
- Pamela Hayden as Milhouse Van Houten, Jimbo Jones, Janey Powell, Rod Flanders and various others
- Tress MacNeille as Agnes Skinner, Dolph Shapiro, Brandine Spuckler, Miss Springfield, Martha Quimby, Bernice Hibbert, Cookie Kwan, Crazy Cat Lady, Myra, Brunella Pommelhorst, Lindsey Naegle, Booberella and various others
- Karl Wiedergott as additional characters
- Maggie Roswell as Luann Van Houten, Helen Lovejoy, Maude Flanders, Elizabeth Hoover and various others
- Russi Taylor as Martin Prince, Sherri, Terri and various others

=== Guest stars ===
Guest stars for the season included.

- Marcia Wallace as Edna Krabappel
  (5 episodes)
- Alec Baldwin as Caleb Thorn
  ("The Bonfire of the Manatees")
- Dennis Rodman as himself
  ("Treehouse of Horror XVI")
- Terry Bradshaw as himself
  ("Treehouse of Horror XVI")
- Lily Tomlin as Tammy
  ("The Last of the Red Hat Mamas")
- Kelsey Grammer as Sideshow Bob
  ("The Italian Bob")
- Maria Grazia Cucinotta as Francesca
  ("The Italian Bob")
- Joe Frazier as himself
  ("Homer's Paternity Coot")
- William H. Macy as himself
  ("Homer's Paternity Coot")
- Michael York as Mason Fairbanks
  ("Homer's Paternity Coot")
- Antonio Fargas as Huggy Bear
  ("Bart Has Two Mommies")
- Randy Johnson as himself
  ("Bart Has Two Mommies")
- Susan Sarandon as herself
  ("Bart Has Two Mommies")
- Dave Thomas as Bob Hope
  ("Bart Has Two Mommies")
- Ricky Gervais as Charles Heathbar
  ("Homer Simpson, This Is Your Wife")
  - Christoph Maria Herbst as Charles Heathbar (in German version)
- Rob Reiner as Himself
  ("Million Dollar Abie")
- Richard Dean Anderson as Himself
  ("Kiss Kiss, Bang Bangalore")
- Frances McDormand as Melanie Upfoot
  ("Girls Just Want to Have Sums")
- Sal Bando as himself
  ("Regarding Margie")
- Gene Tenace as himself
  ("Regarding Margie")
- Melanie Griffith as herself
  ("The Monkey Suit")
- Larry Hagman as Wallace Brady
  ("The Monkey Suit")
- Mandy Moore as Tabitha Vixx
  ("Marge and Homer Turn a Couple Play")
- Stacy Keach as Howard K. Duff
  ("Marge and Homer Turn a Couple Play")

== Episodes ==
No. overall	No. in season	Title	Directed by	Written by	Original release date	Prod. code	U.S. viewers (millions)
357	1	"The Bonfire of the Manatees"	Mark Kirkland	Dan Greaney	September 11, 2005	GABF18	10.8
Because of a gambling debt, Homer allows Fat Tony to shoot an explicit movie in the Simpson home while the family is away. When Marge learns what happened, she angrily leaves and meets Caleb Thorn, an attractive marine biologist, and they go to save manatees while the family looks for her. Marge expects Homer to change, so he helps save a group of manatees from jet skiers. Marge is impressed and reconciles with Homer. Guest star: Alec Baldwin as Caleb Thorn
358	2	"The Girl Who Slept Too Little"	Raymond S. Persi	John Frink	September 18, 2005	GABF16	10.00
When a graveyard is relocated to the lot next to the Simpsons, Lisa has nightmares that prevent her from sleeping. Her parents go to a therapist who says that Lisa needed to care for herself as a baby while they handled Bart and needs to change her mindset to that of a child. Meanwhile, Lisa goes into the graveyard at night to overcome her fear and is locked inside. She hits her head on a tombstone and has a nightmare where she learns it is acceptable to be scared. In the morning, Marge and Homer find her and take her home.
359	3	"Milhouse of Sand and Fog"	Steven Dean Moore	Patric Verrone	September 25, 2005	GABF19	10.46
When Maggie gets chicken pox, Homer tries to capitalize on it by throwing a pox party and inviting parents to infect their children. At the party, Milhouse's parents get back together, but Milhouse feels neglected, and Bart helps break them up again by placing Marge's bra in Kirk's bedroom. Luann informs Homer, who confronts Marge and gets kicked out of the house. To get his parents together, Bart plans to throw a dummy of himself off a cliff, so his parents can rescue him. However, Milhouse pushes the real Bart over the cliff, and Homer jumps in after him. Marge rescues them when Homer trusts her to save them.
360	4	"Treehouse of Horror XVI"	David Silverman	Marc Wilmore	November 6, 2005	GABF17	11.66
B.I. Bartificial Intelligence – Bart falls into a coma after trying to jump into the swimming pool at Patty and Selma's apartment complex. With Bart incapacitated, the Simpsons buy a robot son, who proves to be a better son than Bart ever was, leaving the real Bart to befriend a group of traveling robots. Survival of the Fattest – Mr. Burns hunts down Homer and a small collection of male ancillary characters as part of a new reality show called "The World Series of Manslaughter."; I've Grown a Costume on Your Face – After she loses a Halloween costume contest, a witch turns the townspeople into their Halloween costumes, and Lisa (who is now Albert Einstein) finds out that Maggie (who is dressed as a witch) is the key to revert the spell. Guest stars: Terry Bradshaw and Dennis Rodman
361	5	"Marge's Son Poisoning"	Mike B. Anderson	Daniel Chun	November 13, 2005	GABF20	11.41
Realizing that Marge is lonely, Bart decides to spend extra time with her, causing his classmates to call him a mama's boy. He revels against Marge, leaving her lonely. Feeling guilty, he enters a karaoke contest with her, but after seeing Agnes and Principal Skinner perform, she lets him go to live his own life. Meanwhile, Homer begins exercising and becomes an arm wrestler, with Moe as his coach. He wins an arm wrestling competition but misses Marge, so he goes to sing karaoke with her.
362	6	"See Homer Run"	Nancy Kruse	Stephanie Gillis	November 20, 2005	GABF21	10.31
Homer's reaction to Lisa's Father's Day book causes her to develop a disappointment disorder. To get her respect back, Homer dresses up as a mascot known as the Safety Salamander. When a multi-vehicle collision occurs and Homer rescues them as the salamander, a recall of Mayor Quimby is held, and Homer runs in the election. When Marge washes the salamander costume and ruins it, Homer loses his popularity, and Quimby retains his office.
363	7	"The Last of the Red Hat Mamas"	Matthew Nastuk	Joel H. Cohen	November 27, 2005	GABF22	11.46
Looking for new friends, Marge joins a group of women, whom she gets along with. However, she is conflicted when they plan a heist on Mr. Burns' mansion when he withheld a promised donation. She goes along with them while Homer follows her. When he triggers an alarm, the women escape with one Faberge egg to replace Burns' donation. Meanwhile, Lisa learns Italian from Milhouse and bonds with him until she sees him giving another girl similar lessons and chases him away. Guest Star: Lily Tomlin
364	8	"The Italian Bob"	Mark Kirkland	John Frink	December 11, 2005	HABF02	10.30
Homer brings the whole family along when he is sent to Italy to pick up a new sports car for Mr. Burns. It gets damaged while they drive it, and they look for help in a town whose mayor is Sideshow Bob. Now having a wife and child, he agrees to help the Simpsons if they do not reveal his past. When Lisa gets drunk and exposes Bob, he and his family chase them to Rome, where Krusty is performing. On stage, Bob is tricked into performing while Krusty helps send the Simpsons back to America. Guest Stars: Maria Grazia Cucinotta and Kelsey Grammer
365	9	"Simpsons Christmas Stories"	Steven Dean Moore	Don Payne	December 18, 2005	HABF01	9.93
Three stories about Christmas are told. First, the Simpsons re-enact the Nativity with Homer, Marge, and Bart as the Holy Family with Mr. Burns as King Herod tries to attack them. Next, a World War II tale stars Grampa and Mr. Burns, stranded on an island and shooting down an airplane that is actually Santa's sleigh. Burns tries to escape with the sleigh, but Grampa stops him. Santa promises to return to rescue them but does not return. Finally, a musical features "The Nutcracker Suite" as Moe attempt suicide but fails while Homer looks for a gift for Marge.
366	10	"Homer's Paternity Coot"	Mike B. Anderson	Joel H. Cohen	January 8, 2006	HABF03	10.11
Marge's rage against the new toll road system leads to the discovery of a frozen mailman and his 40-year-old mail. A letter addressed to Abe Simpson shows that Homer may not be his son, and Homer sets out to find his real father. He discovers Mason Fairbanks, a treasure hunter. They take a paternity test, and Mason is Homer's father. When Mason and Homer search for underwater treasure, and Homer has a near-death experience where he sees Grampa, he awakens and learns Grampa switched the test labels because he seemed happier with Mason. Guest Stars: Michael York, William H. Macy and Joe Frazier
367	11	"We're on the Road to D'ohwhere"	Nancy Kruse	Kevin Curran	January 29, 2006	HABF04	8.97
After Bart steals a key from Principal Skinner's office and gets himself into hot water, Marge and Homer send him to a behavior modification camp. Because he is on the No-Fly List, Homer drives him here. On the way, Bart tries to escape, but Homer recovers him. After dropping him off, Homer feels guilty and retrieves him, and they go to Las Vegas and get into trouble. Meanwhile, Lisa and Marge have a yard sale, and Marge makes money selling old prescription drugs until she is arrested. Lisa is left to fend for herself and Maggie.
368	12	"My Fair Laddy"	Bob Anderson	Michael Price	February 26, 2006	HABF05	9.51
When Bart accidentally destroys Willie's shack with a game of solid-ice dodgeball, Marge takes in the homeless janitor in a parody of My Fair Lady. Lisa turns Willie into a gentleman after wagering with Bart that she can do it for the science fair. Lisa wins the science fair and the bet, but Willie misses his old life and returns to his rebuilt shack. Meanwhile, Homer loses his last pair of blue pants, so he creates an advertisement to increase demand and get more pants.
369	13	"The Seemingly Never-Ending Story"	Raymond S. Persi	Ian Maxtone-Graham	March 12, 2006	HABF06	9.71
While exploring with his family, Homer causes a cave to crumble and finds himself stuck upside-down on the ceiling. To pass the time, Lisa tells him a story, with many layers of nested storytelling involved. Moe stole gold coins from Snake to run away with Edna, but she leaves him. Mr. Burns learns of this and steals the coins to give them to the Rich Texan in exchange for his possessions, which Burns lost in a bet earlier. The Rich Texan hid them in the cave, and everyone is there to retrieve them until Marge throws them into a chasm. Emmy Award winning episode.
370	14	"Bart Has Two Mommies"	Michael Marcantel	Dana Gould	March 19, 2006	HABF07	8.67
Marge babysits Rod and Todd Flanders while Ned is away and teaches them to have more fun. Meanwhile, a monkey at the zoo adopts Bart while under Homer's care. When Ned returns and disapproves of Marge's influence, the children protest. Lisa learns that the monkey misses its real son. Marge tries to rescue Bart, but the monkey escapes. Rod, with Ned's encouragement, takes Mr. Teeny, the monkey's son, to it, and it releases Bart. In Heaven, Maude looks down in pride of Rod. Guest Stars: Susan Sarandon, Antonio Fargas, Dave Thomas and Randy Johnson
371	15	"Homer Simpson, This Is Your Wife"	Matthew Nastuk	Ricky Gervais	March 26, 2006	HABF08	10.09
Homer's obsession with Lenny's new plasma TV prompts Marge to enter the family in a sweepstakes, and they win a trip to the Fox Studio Lot. Against Marge's wishes, Homer signs them up for a Trading Spouses/Wife Swap-style reality show and is forced to take in a controlling wife, Verity, while Marge moves in with a beaten-down husband, Charles, and his perfect son. He falls in love with Marge and reveals his marriage troubles, but Marge rejects him. Meanwhile, the Simpsons clash with Verity. Charles takes Marge home to confront Verity, but she has already moved on with Patty. Guest Star: Ricky Gervais
372	16	"Million Dollar Abie"	Steven Dean Moore	Tim Long	April 2, 2006	HABF09	7.84
Grampa is shunned by the town after foiling Homer's plans to make Springfield home to a professional football franchise. He tries to commit suicide, but the town has banned assisted suicide. However, he gains a new purpose in life as a matador. He is successful, and the people cheer for him, but Lisa protests him harming animals. He releases the bulls, but they cause havoc on the town while Lisa is proud of what Grampa did. Guest stars: Rob Reiner and Michael Carrington
373	17	"Kiss Kiss, Bang Bangalore"	Mark Kirkland	Deb Lacusta & Dan Castellaneta	April 9, 2006	HABF10	8.27
Homer learns the nuclear power plant is being shut down and outsourced to India, where the new workers worship him as a god. Worried for Homer, the family goes to India with Mr. Burns and learn that they worship him because he introduced American benefits, so Burns returns the plant to America where the workers are ignorant. Meanwhile, Patty and Selma kidnap Richard Dean Anderson but soon grow annoyed by his antics when he wants to keep escaping using MacGyver-style tactics, and they send him away. Guest Star: Richard Dean Anderson
374	18	"The Wettest Stories Ever Told"	Mike B. Anderson	Jeff Westbrook	April 23, 2006	HABF11	7.10
When the Simpsons' plans for a nice family outing at the Frying Dutchman turn into a dining disaster, the family (and show writers) try to salvage the night by telling three tales of disasters at sea: in "Mayflower Madman," Pilgrims Moe and Homer fight for the hand of Goody Marge while sailing to Plymouth Rock; in "The Whine-Bar Sea," Bart leads a mutiny against Captain Principal Skinner; and in "Watership D'ohn," The Simpsons (and a collection of ancillary characters) re-enact The Poseidon Adventure.
375	19	"Girls Just Want to Have Sums"	Nancy Kruse	Matt Selman	April 30, 2006	HABF12	8.74
Principal Skinner is replaced by a women's education expert after making a sexist statement about women's math skills during a musical, which was written by a former female Springfield Elementary school student who was a math whiz, who segregates the school by gender. At first, Lisa loves the arrangement, but when she discovers that the girls' classes are more about self-esteem boosting than actual learning, Lisa disguises herself as a boy and attends the boys' classes. When she is recognized for her math performance and reveals herself, Bart says she only performed well because she learned to think like a boy. She makes a speech saying she is proud of her feminism and intelligence. Guest Star: Frances McDormand as Melanie Upfoot
376	20	"Regarding Margie"	Mike Frank Polcino	Marc Wilmore	May 7, 2006	HABF13	8.47
Marge goes nuts trying to clean the kitchen in time for a best house contest, but when she inhales the fumes of one too many cleaning solvents, she passes out and bangs her head on a stool. When Marge comes to at the hospital, she is stricken with amnesia, which does not last when she immediately remembers everyone in the family through their quirks—except for Homer. With Marge's memory of Homer erased, Patty and Selma help their sister find a new man. Guest Stars: Sal Bando and Gene Tenace
377	21	"The Monkey Suit"	Raymond S. Persi	J. Stewart Burns	May 14, 2006	HABF14	8.41
Reverend Lovejoy is appointed to spread the word of creationism in Springfield after Flanders complains about a new museum display about evolution, leading creationism to be taught in schools, and Lisa to fight back with secret classes about Charles Darwin and his theories of evolution. However, she is quickly arrested and a trial against her is initiated. Worried Lisa will lose, Marge gives Homer a beer at the trial that he has trouble opening. As Ned testifies, he is distracted by Homer and calls him a monkey. He concedes victory to Lisa. Guest Stars: Melanie Griffith and Larry Hagman
378	22	"Marge and Homer Turn a Couple Play"	Bob Anderson	Joel H. Cohen	May 21, 2006	HABF16	8.22
A first baseman for the Springfield Isotopes, Buck Mitchell, calls upon Homer and Marge to help him with his marriage to a pop singer named Tabitha Vixx, who upstages him with a racy musical number during one of his games. Their advice helps, and his on-field performance improves. When Buck punches Homer when he thinks Homer is having an affair with Tabitha, his performance drops again. Homer tricks Buck with a message of love from Tabitha from a blimp, but he is discovered. As Buck threatens Homer, Tabitha says she wants to stay together, and he agrees. Guest Stars: Mandy Moore and Stacy Keach

== Production ==
By April 2005, the series was renewed for a seventeenth season. Al Jean remained showrunner, with this being his fifth year in the position since he started it in season 13, while the season was produced by Gracie Films and 20th Century Fox Television. David Silverman was the supervising director of animation. New writers included Patric Verrone (previously a writer for The Critic, Futurama, and then-current president of the Writers Guild of America, Western Division), Daniel Chun, and Stephanie Gillis. The season featured an episode from guest writer and guest star Ricky Gervais. During this season, there were no episodes that aired during the month of October.

Seven hold-over episodes from the season 16 (GABF) production line aired as part of this season. One of these episodes, "The Girl Who Slept Too Little", was intended to air as the season 16 finale on May 15, 2005, but after "The Father, the Son, and the Holy Guest Star", an episode satirizing the Catholic Church, was postponed due to Pope John Paul II's death, it was moved into this season.

By March 2006, the series had been renewed for an eighteenth and nineteenth season.

== Reception ==
=== Reviews ===
The season was met with mixed-to-positive reviews. Jeffry Kauffman of Blu-ray.com gave the season 4/5. He said the season was "arguably an incremental step downward" but he still thought "There are still delights galore to be sampled throughout the season," Shadowlocked gave the season 4/5 stars. Luke Connolly said that the season did a great job at tying things together and praised "Girls Just Want to have Sums" and "We're on the Road to D'ohwhere" as highlights. He concluded by saying "While season 17 shows its age in certain places, its continual pursuit of originality and familiar comedy more than makes up for this, and one cannot help but be impressed." Fanboy Nation's Sean Mukvihill was positive on the season saying "Even though it isn't as a great as it once was, the show still boast some very clever writing and the best voice cast of any animated program in history." Capsule Computers was more critical of the season giving the season 5.5/10 and commented "As a long time fan of the early Simpsons that involved great episodes with hilarious, tightly developed plots, it is hard to stomach what the show has become." Spotlight Report gave the season 3.0/5 criticizing that it wasn't as funny as previous seasons.

Colin Jacobson of DVD Movie Guide said that the season "overcomes the weaker seasons and becomes a fairly entertaining collection of episodes" and concluded that "The Blu-ray offers very good picture quality, good audio, and bonus features. Fans will enjoy season 17." Ron Cerabona of The Sydney Morning Herald found the season enjoyable and offered plenty of laughs, saying, "It may be past its peak and occasionally show signs of repetition and despair, but this long-running animated series remains one of the funniest and most entertaining programs on television." John Schwarz of Bubbleblabber gave it an eight out of ten praising the DVD's content and the episode commentary, saying "In any case, hearing Matt Groening rave about The Simpsons, even after all this time, is a gem in itself, and should not be missed by die-hard Simpsons fans."

=== Awards ===
"The Seemingly Never-Ending Story" won an Emmy for Outstanding Animated Program, the first Simpsons episode to win since season 14's "Three Gays of the Condo" and the ninth time in the history of the show. Kelsey Grammer received the Emmy for Outstanding Voice-Over Performance for "The Italian Bob".

At the 59th Writers Guild of America Awards, John Frink won the Writers Guild of America Award for Television: Animation for his script for "The Italian Bob". The writers for "Simpsons Christmas Stories", "Kiss Kiss, Bang Bangalore", and "Girls Just Want to Have Sums" were nominated for the same award. The writers for "The Girl Who Slept Too Little" and "See Homer Run" were nominated for the same award at the 58th Writers Guild of America Awards.

At the 34th Annie Awards, Ian Maxtone-Graham won the Annie Award for Outstanding Achievement for Writing in an Animated Television/Broadcast Production for his script for "The Seemingly Never-Ending Story". At the 16th Environmental Media Awards, "The Bonfire of the Manatees" won the award for Television Episodic Comedy.

=== Nielsen ratings ===
The show ranked 56th in the seasonal ratings tied with Invasion, America's Funniest Home Videos, and The Amazing Race with a viewership 9.2 million viewers and an 18–49 Nielsen Rating of 4.4/11.

== Home media ==
The DVD and Blu-ray box set for season seventeen was released by 20th Century Fox Home Entertainment in the United States and Canada on Tuesday, December 2, 2014, eight years after it had completed broadcast on television. As well as every episode from the season, the Blu-ray and DVD releases feature bonus material including deleted scenes, animatics, and commentaries for every episode. The box art features Sideshow Bob, and a special limited-edition "embossed head case" package was also released.

This is the only season of The Simpsons to receive a 15 rating in the UK, but this is due to the additional material (the episodes are only a 12 rating).

The Complete Seventeenth Season
Set Details			Special Features
22 episodes; 3-disc set (Blu-ray); 4-disc set (DVD); 1.33:1 aspect ratio; AUDIO (DVD); English 5.1 Dolby Digital; Spanish 2.0 Dolby Surround; French 2.0 Dolby Surround; AUDIO (Blu-ray); English 5.1 DTS HD Master Audio; Spanish 5.1 Dolby Digital; French 5.1 Dolby Digital; SUBTITLES; English SDH; Spanish			Optional commentaries for all 22 episodes; Buogiorno, Simpsons Lovers; Deleted Scenes; The Bonfire of the Manatees; The Girl Who Slept Too Little; Milhouse of Sand and Fog; Treehouse of Horror XVI; See Homer Run; The Last of the Red Hat Mamas; Simpsons Christmas Stories; Homer's Paternity Coot; We're on the Road to D'ohwhere; Bart Has Two Mommies; Homer Simpson, This Is Your Wife; Million Dollar Abie; Kiss Kiss, Bang Bangalore; The Wettest Stories Ever Told; The Monkey Suit; Marge and Homer Turn a Couple Play; Special Language Feature; Homer Simpson, This Is Your Wife; Hungarian 2.0; Ukrainian 2.0; German 2.0; Italian 2.0; The Great ones; Live! It's The Simpsons; Sketch Gallery 1 & 2; Easter Egg; Let there be Music!; Animation Showcase; Bonus Episodes: "Krusty Gets Busted" (Blu-ray exclusive); "Cape Feare" (Blu-ray exclusive); "The Man Who Grew Too Much"
Release Dates
Region 1	Region 2	Region 4	
Tuesday, December 2, 2014	Monday, December 1, 2014	Wednesday, December 3, 2014	
