= The Seemingly Never-Ending Story =

- The Simpsons episode
- Promotional image featuring the family trapped in a cave
- Episode no.: Season 17; Episode 13
- Directed by: Raymond S. Persi
- Written by: Ian Maxtone-Graham
- Production code: HABF06
- Original air date: March 12, 2006

Guest appearances
- Maurice LaMarche as Commander McBragg; Marcia Wallace as Edna Krabappel

Episode features
- Couch gag: The couch (with Marge, Maggie, Bart, and Lisa on it) is delivered to the living room via a conveyor belt and stops in front of the TV. Homer is added on by a mechanical arm and the couch continues onward.
- Commentary: Al Jean; Ian Maxtone-Graham; Matt Selman; John Frink; Michael Price; Raymond Persi; David Silverman

Episode chronology
| ← Previous "My Fair Laddy" | Next → "Bart Has Two Mommies" |
- The Simpsons season 17

"The Seemingly Never-Ending Story" is the thirteenth episode of the seventeenth season of the American animated television series The Simpsons. It originally aired on the Fox network in the United States on March 12, 2006. The episode was written by Ian Maxtone-Graham and directed by Raymond S. Persi.

In this episode, Lisa tells several stories to Homer after the family gets trapped in a cave. The episode contains many levels of nested storytelling, much like the novel The NeverEnding Story by Michael Ende, which the title references. The episode received positive reviews, and it won the Emmy Award for Outstanding Animated Program. Maxtone-Graham won the Annie Award for Outstanding Achievement for Writing.

== Plot ==
Visiting a cave, Homer tampers with a fragile stalactite, causing the family to fall through the floor and leaving Homer hanging upside down. While Marge and Bart look for an exit, Lisa tells him a story to pass the time. Last week, Lisa encountered a bighorn sheep, which chases her. She runs to the nearest shelter, Mr. Burns' house, and they hide in the attic. Lisa finds a photo of Burns working at Moe's Tavern, and he tells her the story.

Burns and Rich Texan were involved in a scavenger hunt where the winner receives the loser's possessions. Burns obtained every item except a picture of himself with a smiling child. The Texan won, so Burns began working at Moe's to earn money. He found and read a letter written by Moe describing his treasure. Moe met a newly arrived Edna Krabappel, and they fell in love. Moe planned to leave Springfield with her but had no money. He encountered Snake, an idealistic archaeologist, who intended to donate gold coins to a museum. Moe stole them from Snake, leading him to be a criminal. Before leaving with Moe, Edna stopped by Springfield Elementary School to resign and found Bart seemingly in detention. Edna told Moe that she must stay to help Bart succeed. Moe became depressed and used his coins to play music on the tavern's jukebox.

Burns took the coins from the jukebox and bought his possessions back, but the Texan refused to give the power plant back until Burns completed the scavenger hunt. The sheep bursts into the attic, and Burns gets hurt defending Lisa. The sheep had found Lisa's pearl necklace earlier and is returning it. To thank him, Lisa takes a photo of her and Burns together, allowing him to get the plant back.

Homer breaks free. He confesses that he saw the Texan hide the coins in the cave and brought the family there to steal them. Suddenly, the Texan arrives, and the coins are found. Moe, Burns, and Snake appear and enter a Mexican standoff. Marge takes the coins and drops them into a chasm, and they thank her for ending their greed. They go out to volunteer as a way of atoning for their sins, while Burns promises to catch up with them after climbing down the chasm to retrieve the coins. The entire episode turns out to be a story told by Bart to Principal Skinner, explaining why he did not have time to study for a test. Skinner is unconvinced until he sees Edna kissing Moe outside.

== Reception ==
=== Viewing figures ===
The episode earned a 3.5 rating and was watched by 9.71 million viewers, the 38th most-watched show that week.

=== Critical response ===
Timothy Sexton of Yahoo said that The Seemingly Never-Ending Story was "innovative", and "featured the kind of intricate development that you don't get in shows such as Friends, Will & Grace, Ally McBeal or Everybody Loves Raymond". Sexton noted that each of those series won the Best Comedy Emmy Award in a year that The Simpsons aired but was not even nominated.

Adam Finley of TV Squad liked the layering of stories but thought it felt like a series of stories that could not be an episode on their own.

Colin Jacobson of DVD Movie Guide said the episode "manages a clever approach to the" anthology genre and enjoyed the changes with the characters.

On Four Finger Discount, Brendan Dando and Guy Davis liked the episode as long as viewers ignore continuity or logic.

In 2015, Erik Adams of The A.V. Club named the episode as one of the 10 best episodes between season 17 and season 25 and called the plots "ambitious". The same year, Jesse Schedeen of IGN called it one of the top 10 episodes since season 12 and called it "a clever and consistently entertaining episode" similar to the seventh season episode "22 Short Films About Springfield". In 2019, Bernardo Sim of Screen Rant called it the best episode of the 17th season. In 2023, Tony Sokol of Den of Geek named the episode the third best episode of the 2000s and said it had "enough origin tales to qualify as a hastily buried treasure".

=== Awards and nominations ===
At the 58th Primetime Creative Arts Emmy Awards, the episode won the Primetime Emmy Award for Outstanding Animated Program (For Programming less than One Hour). The episode beat out the South Park episode "Trapped in the Closet", in which Tom Cruise and Scientology are satirized. Executive producer Al Jean, accepting the award, said: "This is what happens when you don't mock Scientology." At the 34th Annie Awards, episode writer Ian Maxtone-Graham won the Annie Award for Outstanding Achievement for Writing in an Animated Television/Broadcast Production.
