= Bart Has Two Mommies =

- The Simpsons episode
- Episode no.: Season 17; Episode 14
- Directed by: Michael Marcantel
- Written by: Dana Gould
- Production code: HABF07
- Original air date: March 19, 2006

Guest appearances
- Antonio Fargas as Huggy Bear; Randy Johnson as himself; Susan Sarandon as herself; Dave Thomas as Bob Hope

Episode features
- Couch gag: The living room is blocked by a laser security system. The Simpsons work their way through the system and successfully make it to the couch. However, when they sit down, Homer's head falls off.
- Commentary: Matt Groening; Al Jean; Dana Gould; David Silverman; Mike B. Anderson; Michael Marcantel; Matt Selman; Joel H. Cohen; Michael York

Episode chronology
← Previous "The Seemingly Never-Ending Story"	Next → "Homer Simpson, This Is Your Wife"
- The Simpsons season 17

"Bart Has Two Mommies" is the fourteenth episode of the seventeenth season of the American animated television series The Simpsons. It originally aired on the Fox network in the United States on March 19, 2006. The episode was written by Dana Gould and directed by Michael Marcantel.

In the episode, Marge Simpson babysits for Flanders' sons while Bart is kidnapped by a chimpanzee. Baseball player Randy Johnson and actress Susan Sarandon voiced themselves. The episode received mixed reviews.

== Plot ==
The Simpson family attend a church fundraiser for a new steeple. Ned Flanders wins a rubber duck racing contest and is awarded a computer, although he gives it to Marge because he does not have any use for it. Marge babysits Rod and Todd while Ned attends a left-handed convention to repay the favor. She finds that all the games they play are boring and overly safe, such as a "sitting still contest," and helps Rod and Todd have fun by encouraging them to liven up. At the left-handed convention, Ned meets baseball hall of famer Randy Johnson (who was then playing for the New York Yankees), who is there to pitch his own line of teddy bears called Randy Johnson's Southpawz. After asking Johnson if he has any mailman teddy bears, the pitcher tells Ned that a teddy bear can't be a mailman. Johnson then asks Ned how many doctor bears he wants as they come in a box of 1,000. When Ned tells him he only wants one box, this makes Johnson angry with Ned. Marge tells a returned Ned that his sons are great kids.

With Marge spending so much time at the Flanders' house, Homer, Bart, and Lisa go to an animal sanctuary for retired film animals. Bart sees an elderly female chimpanzee named Toot-Toot and offers her some ice cream, only to be taken into her cage and "adopted." Ned comes home and sees Todd wearing a Band-Aid, having injured himself during one of Marge's games. He starts his trend of completely overreacting by lambasting Marge for not preventing the very minor injury. Marge encourages Ned to let his kids start taking more risks, showing him a flyer for a child-safe activity center.

Marge takes Rod and Todd to the activity center. Ned follows her and is surprised to see Rod climbing a structure, yelling that he will get hurt. Rod gets worried and falls, chipping a tooth against the structure. An enraged Ned bans Marge from being around his sons. A news broadcast plays about Bart's kidnapping, shocking Marge and causing everyone at the center to view her as an unfit mother. Ned then babyproofs the house and "cheerfully" tells his sons it's time to play a lame card game, only to be shocked when they loudly tell him no. He looks thoughtful as he hears that Rod and Todd actually felt happy being around Marge (and "for real" happy, not "church" Happy) for the first time since their mom passed away.

Lisa suggests that Toot-Toot is keeping Bart captive because her real son has gone missing, and they find him in a surprising place: he's Mr. Teeny, Krusty's simian sidekick. When Marge goes into the cage to talk to Toot-Toot, she escapes and climbs atop the unfinished church steeple, which Reverend Lovejoy, anticipating the worst, pledges to name in Bart's memory. Ned starts to freak out as Rod replicates his earlier climb to get Mr. Teeny to Toot-Toot, but after Marge tells him that his sons need his support and not his smothering useleness, he calms down and exhorts Rod to successfully complete the climb, which he does. Toot-Toot happily reunites with Mr. Teeny and lets Bart go. In a mid-credits scene, Maude Flanders looks down from Heaven, proud that Rod is growing up. God and Bob Hope enjoy hanging out together and snark on Maude a little bit before walking away.

== Production ==
This episode was recorded on May 9, 2005, and the script was finalized for the first time on May 27, 2005.

Actress Susan Sarandon voiced herself as the voice of the FeMac computer won by Ned. Sarandon previous guest starred as a ballet teacher in the sixth season episode "Homer vs. Patty and Selma". Left-handed pitcher Randy Johnson makes a cameo appearance at the Left-Handed convention selling his own line of left-handed teddy bears.

== Cultural references ==
The episode title refers to the children's book Heather Has Two Mommies. The FeMac computer is a parody of the iMac G4, and it runs AOL software.

== Purported foreshadowing ==
In 2016, the incident with the gorilla Harambe generated reports that the subplot involving Bart and the chimpanzee was a purported foreshadowing of the event.

== Reception ==
=== Viewing figures ===
The episode earned a 3.1 rating and was watched by 8.67 million viewers, which was the 48th most-watched show that week.

=== Critical response ===
Adam Finley of TV Squad said the main plot of Marge and the Flanders children was "okay but forgettable." He highlighted Homer's attempt to retrieve his rubber duck and the Flanders children playing on the seesaw.

Colin Jacobson of DVD Movie Guide said the story of Marge with Rod and Todd was "positive" but disliked the Bart subplot.

On Four Finger Discount, Guy Davis and Brendan Dando said the main plot with the Flanders children was relatable but they thought the subplot with Bart was "random".
