= The Monkey Suit =

- The Simpsons episode
- Episode no.: Season 17; Episode 21
- Directed by: Raymond S. Persi
- Written by: J. Stewart Burns
- Production code: HABF14
- Original air date: May 14, 2006

Guest appearances
- Melanie Griffith as herself; Larry Hagman as Wallace Brady

Episode features
- Chalkboard gag: "Je ne parle pas français" (French for “I don't speak French”)
- Couch gag: A photographer takes the Simpsons' picture, which sets off a slideshow of events from 2006 to 2013.
- Commentary: Al Jean; J. Stewart Burns; Matt Selman; Tim Long; Marc Wilmore; Raymond S. Persi

Episode chronology
← Previous "Regarding Margie"	Next → "Marge and Homer Turn a Couple Play"
- The Simpsons season 17

"The Monkey Suit" is the twenty-first and penultimate episode of the seventeenth season of the American animated television series The Simpsons. It originally aired on the Fox network in the United States on May 14, 2006. In the episode, Ned Flanders is shocked after seeing a new display at the museum about evolution. Together with Reverend Lovejoy, he spreads the religious belief of creationism in Springfield, and at a later town meeting, teaching evolution is made illegal. As a result, Lisa decides to hold secret classes for people interested in evolution. However, she is quickly arrested and a trial against her is initiated.

J. Stewart Burns wrote "The Monkey Suit", for which he received inspiration from the 1925 Scopes Monkey Trial. The episode features a few references to this legal case, as well as several references to popular culture. Many analysts have commented on the episode's treatment of the creation–evolution controversy, a dispute about the origin of humanity between those who support a creationist view based upon their religious beliefs, versus those who accept evolution, as supported by scientific evidence.

Critics have given the episode generally positive reviews, praising it for its satire of the creation-evolution debate. "The Monkey Suit" has won an award from the Independent Investigations Group (IIG) for being "one of those rare shows in the media that encourage science, critical thinking, and ridicule those shows that peddle pseudoscience and superstition." In 2007, a scene from the episode was highlighted in the scientific journal Nature.

== Plot ==
After Bart hurriedly completes a series of summer vacation activities days before the start of the new academic year, Lisa decides to take the family to the museum to see a weaving exhibit. However, they soon discover that it has been replaced by a "History of Weapons" exhibit, sponsored by Kellogg's. Faced with an incredibly long line, Homer notices Ned Flanders and his sons at the front of the line and cuts in front of them. Everyone else starts taking advantage of Ned's kindness as well until the Flanders family is stuck at the end. At the end of the day, they are still waiting, and are denied entry, as it is closing time for the weapons exhibit. They decide to check out the human evolution exhibit next door. Ned is outraged to hear that humans actually evolved from apes and that the creation account in the Genesis is therefore a myth. Covering his sons' eyes, he forcefully drags them out of the exhibit.

Ned meets up with the church council to suggest promotion of creationism. The next day, he and Reverend Lovejoy blackmail Principal Skinner into introducing creationism in the school. Lisa is perturbed by this, and at a town meeting asks everyone to make a choice between creationism and Darwinism, as there is only one truth. The townspeople vote for creationism, much to her chagrin, and the act of teaching or learning Darwinism and evolution is made illegal. Lisa therefore decides to start holding secret classes for people interested in evolution. However, just as the first lesson is about to begin, she is arrested by Chief Wiggum. She asks why she is being arrested when there are far worse crimes out there, and embarrassed he tells her they only have enough manpower to enforce the last three laws passed (as demonstrated by their non-response to Snake randomly shooting at people from atop the Kwik-E-Mart whilst yelling "you live, you die"). Lisa is brought to trial, which is dubbed Lisa Simpson v. God. Representing her is Clarice Drummond, an ACLU lawyer, while on Ned's side is Wallace Brady, an overweight, southern lawyer. The trial does not go smoothly for Lisa, as Professor Frink gives ambiguous answers regarding God's existence, while a creationist says that evolution cannot be real, as there is no proof of a "missing link" (depicted in a picture as a savage hominid, holding a rock over his head).

After reading Charles Darwin's On the Origin of Species (incorrectly called The Origin of Species), Marge believes that he presents a convincing argument and decides to help Lisa (whilst Bart proposes sending Milhouse in disguise in her place to allow Lisa to flee the country). When the trial resumes, Marge tells Lisa that she now knows a way that she can help her. While Ned is being cross-examined by Drummond, she gives Homer a beer. Homer, ecstatic at getting the beer, tries to open it unsuccessfully. The more he tries, the more primitive he gets, hooting and banging the beer on the bench, disrupting the trial. Ned loses his temper and tells Homer to stop behaving like a monkey. Drummond then asks Ned to compare the picture of the "missing link" and Homer shaking the beer over his head, and asks if he truly believes Homer cannot be related to apes. Ned cannot and concedes victory to Lisa. After the trial, Lisa goes up to Ned and tells him that while she fully respects his religious beliefs, she just does not think it is proper for the church to dominate the school in the same way that he and Reverend Lovejoy do not want scientists taking over the church. Ned finally agrees with this, so he offers to take Lisa and his sons out for ice cream. However Todd (in a call back to an earlier joke) turns out to be Nelson instead after he insults Ned and pulls off his mask.

== Production ==
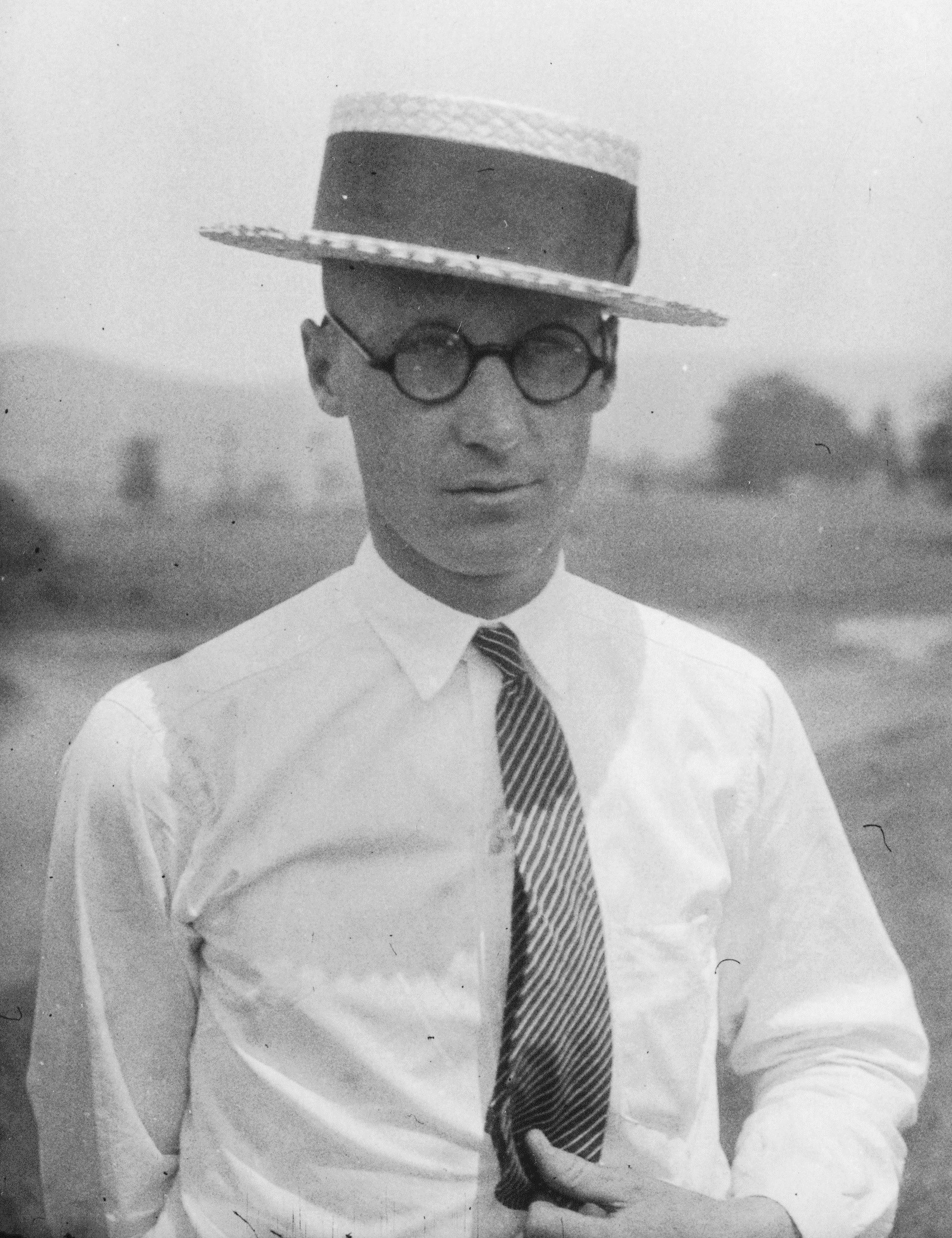
A legal case involving high school science teacher John Scopes served as inspiration for the episode.

"The Monkey Suit" was written by J. Stewart Burns and directed by Raymond S. Persi as part of the seventeenth season of The Simpsons (2005–2006). Burns received inspiration for the episode from the Scopes Monkey Trial, a 1925 legal case in which high school science teacher John Scopes was accused of violating Tennessee's Butler Act which made teaching evolution unlawful. Clarice Drummond, the ACLU lawyer who represents Lisa, is a reference to the ACLU lawyer Clarence Darrow who defended Scopes, while Wallace Brady is a reference to William Jennings Bryan, an attorney in the Scopes Monkey Trial. American actor and Dallas star Larry Hagman guest starred in the episode as Wallace Brady, while American actress Melanie Griffith played herself as the narrator of an audio tour at the museum. Burns did research for "The Monkey Suit" by reading Richard Dawkins' book The Selfish Gene and watching Inherit the Wind (a film loosely based on the Scopes Monkey Trial). He also visited a natural history museum.

The opening of the episode, in which Bart rushes to do everything he planned on doing during summer vacation, was originally written and animated for the season fourteen episode "I'm Spelling as Fast as I Can" (2003) but was cut. This episode came in short, and to fill in time, the sequence was added. Burns has said commented the episode "ended up being incredibly short because when you do an episode where there's really just one good side of an argument [creation vs. evolution], you don't fill out as much time as you need to." The opening sequence features a large number of allusions to popular culture, including references to The Natural (1984 film), Happy Days (television sitcom), and Men in Black (1997 film).

== Themes ==
"The Monkey Suit" is an episode that tackles the creation–evolution controversy, and according to Theresa Sanders in her book Approaching Eden: Adam and Eve in Popular Culture, "skewered antievolution legislation." The authors of the book Chronology of the Evolution-Creationism Controversy commented that the episode "caricatures creationism as an intellectual joke." Burns has cited the episode as "a nice example of The Simpsons really taking one clear side". However, as pointed out by Sanders, it "should be pointed out that though the Simpsons episode clearly sides with Darwin, evolutionists come in for criticism as well. When Ned and his sons go into the museum's Hall of Man, one of the exhibits they see in support of evolution is a collection of dinosaur bones with the title 'Indisputable Fossil Records.' The cartoon's inclusion of the sign can be interpreted as mocking the pretension that science knows all and may not be questioned." Sanders cited another scene as an example of this; at the trial, Drummond asks Professor Frink if "this theory of evolution necessarily mean that there is no God?", to which he replies, "No, of course not. It just says that God is an impotent nothing from nowhere with less power than the undersecretary of Agriculture." Sanders wrote that "His arrogance is clear, and equally clear is the show's satirical presentation of science's hubris."

Ted Gournelos analyzed "The Monkey Suit" in his 2009 book Popular Culture and the Future of Politics: Cultural Studies and the Tao of South Park, writing: "More than anything, the episode is used to critique the demonization of evolutionary theory by religious propaganda, by an instructional video used in the school (that shows a drunken Charles Darwin passionately kissing Satan) as well as by the prosecuting attorney. This allows for a somewhat leftist discussion of the issue, but ultimately is unable to address the rise of Christian fundamentalism in the United States [...]". Gournelos noted that the episode focuses on the old Scopes Monkey Trial and does not address contemporary creation–evolution debates, adding: "Interestingly, The Simpsons continues to place creationism at a higher popular plain than evolution, as the jury and trial audience are obviously biased towards the creationists (who, unlike in contemporary cases, are the prosecutors rather than the plaintiffs)." Gournelos concluded that the episode "pokes gentle fun at media rhetoric and the questioning of evolutionary theory [...], but is unable or unwilling to address the rise of intelligent design or contemporary court battles (in Pennsylvania [see Kitzmiller v. Dover Area School District], Kansas [see Kansas evolution hearings], and elsewhere) that might encourage debate in its audience."

== Release ==
The episode originally aired on the Fox network in the United States on May 14, 2006. During this broadcast, it was seen by approximately 8.41 million viewers, finishing forty-sixth in the ratings for the week of May 8–14, 2006.

Since airing, the episode has received generally positive reviews from critics.

In a retrospective that was published on the twentieth anniversary of The Simpsons in 2010, writers for BBC News selected "The Monkey Suit" as one of the show's "10 classic episodes", one they said demonstrated that "the writers still have fire in their bellies."

TV Squad critic Adam Finley wrote that "Last night's episode had some good moments, but it did feel like they were treading upon somewhat familiar ground and not saying anything especially new," referring to the fact the issue of science and religion has been dealt with before on the show, "most notably in the 'Lisa the Skeptic' episode in which the supposed skeleton of a dead angel is found."

In 2007, "The Monkey Suit" won an award from the Independent Investigations Group (IIG) for being "one of those rare shows in the media that encourage science, critical thinking, and ridicule those shows that peddle pseudoscience and superstition." J. Stewart Burns, the writer of the episode, was present at the awards ceremony to accept the award.

While reviewing the seventeenth season of The Simpsons, Jesse Hassenger of PopMatters noted that he thought the show had declined in quality compared to its earlier years, and added that the stronger episodes in the later seasons are that ones that "satirize topical issues", giving "The Monkey Suit" as an example.

Similarly, Fort Worth Star-Telegram staff writer Robert Philpot commented that "Even in its weak seasons, this show has always been good for at least one belly laugh per episode. Not this year [season seventeen]. Aside from an installment that took on the evolution -vs.-creationism edge and a couple of other bits, the satirical edge has really dulled, making the announcement that it will have at least two more seasons a cause for concern rather than celebration."

In the July 26, 2007 issue of Nature, the scientific journal's editorial staff listed among "The Top Ten science moments in The Simpsons" the scene from the episode in which "Flanders is flabbergasted that the science museum's exhibit on the origins of man both highlights evolution and makes light of creationism — and, to top it all, has a unisex bathroom."

== See also ==
- History of the creation–evolution controversy
- Creation and evolution in public education
