= Milhouse of Sand and Fog =

- The Simpsons episode
- Episode no.: Season 17; Episode 3
- Directed by: Steven Dean Moore
- Written by: Patric M. Verrone
- Production code: GABF19
- Original air date: September 25, 2005

Episode features
- Couch gag: The Simpsons sit down on the couch as normal. A TiVo menu pops up, asking the viewer if they would like to save the recording or delete it. "Delete This Recording" is chosen and the screen goes black.
- Commentary: Al Jean; Patric M. Verrone; Matt Selman; Tim Long; Kevin Curran; J. Stewart Burns; Michael Price; Steve Dean Moore

Episode chronology
← Previous "The Girl Who Slept Too Little"	Next → "Treehouse of Horror XVI"
- The Simpsons season 17

"Milhouse of Sand and Fog" is the third episode of the seventeenth season of the American animated television series The Simpsons. It originally aired on Fox network in the United States on September 25, 2005. The episode was written by Patric M. Verrone and directed by Steven Dean Moore.

In this episode, Milhouse’s parents reconcile, which makes him feel neglected, so he and Bart tried to break them up, which accidentally causes Homer and Marge to fight. The episode received mixed reviews.

== Plot ==
During Reverend Lovejoy's sermon, Maggie is scratching. The family takes Maggie to see Dr. Hibbert, who diagnoses Maggie with chicken pox. Inspired by Ned Flanders' suggestion of purposely exposing his sons to chicken pox, Homer invites all the neighborhood kids over to the Simpson house for a "pox party". Having no childhood immunity, he ends up catching it himself by drinking from Maggie's milk bottle. Milhouse's parents Luann and Kirk attend the party, and after getting drunk on Marge's custom margaritas, they resume their relationship.

Kirk and Luann inform Milhouse that they are considering reuniting. However, Milhouse feels neglected because his parents are not fawning over him as they did while they were separated. He schemes to break them up again, and Bart helps him with a plot borrowed from The O.C.. The boys place a bra, belonging to Marge, on Kirk's bed. Luann finds the bra, assumes Marge is having an affair with Kirk, and informs Homer. When Homer confronts Marge, she angrily denies the allegation and kicks him out of the house.

Prodded by Lisa, a remorseful Bart confesses to Marge of what he did, but Marge refuses to reconcile with Homer due to his mistrust towards her. To bring Homer and Marge back together, Lisa inadvertently influences Bart and Milhouse to plan to throw a dummy that looks like Bart off a cliff into the river below, while Homer and Marge, after receiving false messages from each other to meet, watch. However, after breaking his glasses, Milhouse accidentally pushes the real Bart off the cliff. Homer jumps into the rapids to save him, but they end up clinging to a rock near a waterfall. There, Bart confesses to Homer what he did, leading Homer to strangle him. Marge advises them to trust her and let go of the rock. They let go, and she catches them while swinging from a rope tied to a tree. Once safely on the riverbank, Marge and Homer reconcile. They see Milhouse, thinking Bart died, jump off the cliff, leaving his fate unresolved. Marge wonders if Milhouse can swim, to which Bart asks "What do you think?"

== Production ==
Writer Patric M. Verrone based the episode on his own experiences at the time since he was raising three children and dealing with chickenpox.

== Cultural references ==
In August 2022, screenshots from this episode were used in social media to erroneously show that the series had predicted the 2022–2023 mpox outbreak. Instead, the screenshots from this episode showing Homer with rashes were combined with an image of Homer with a monkey from the ninth season episode "Girly Edition."

== Reception ==
=== Viewing figures ===
The episode earned a 3.7 rating and was watched by 10.46 million viewers, which was the 34th most-watched show that week.

=== Critical response ===
Ryan Budke of TV Squad enjoyed the first half of the episode featuring Maggie and the chickenpox but thought the second half "seemed almost phoned in." He also did not like that two of the first three episodes of the season featured Homer and Marge fighting.

Colin Jacobson of DVD Movie Guide said it was a "moderately amusing episode" reexamining the Kirk and Luann relationship since most character changes are undone by episode's end.

In 2021, Hannah Saab of Screen Rant named this episode as one of the 10 best episodes featuring Milhouse.

== See also ==
- "Chickenpox", an episode of South Park similarly addressing a pox party intended to spread varicella
