= My Fair Laddy =

- The Simpsons episode
- Promotional artwork for the episode.
- Episode no.: Season 17; Episode 12
- Directed by: Bob Anderson
- Written by: Michael Price
- Production code: HABF05
- Original air date: February 26, 2006

Guest appearance
- Marcia Wallace as Edna Krabappel

Episode features
- Couch gag: Filmed in claymation, six balls roll in and bump into each other before turning into Homer, Marge, Bart, Lisa, Maggie, and Gumby.
- Commentary: Al Jean; Michael Price; Matt Selman; Carolyn Omine; Tom Gammill; Max Pross; David Silverman; Steven Dean Moore

Episode chronology
← Previous "We're on the Road to D'ohwhere"	Next → "The Seemingly Never-Ending Story"
- The Simpsons season 17

"My Fair Laddy" is the twelfth episode of the seventeenth season of the American animated television series The Simpsons. It first aired on the Fox network in the United States on February 26, 2006. The episode was written by Michael Price and directed by Bob Anderson.

In this episode, Lisa makes a bet with Bart that she can turn Groundskeeper Willie into a proper gentleman while Homer creates an advertising campaign for blue pants so he can buy a new pair. The title and plot are based on the Broadway musical and film My Fair Lady. The episode received positive reviews.

== Plot ==
When Mrs. Pummelhorst (the school gym teacher) announces that she will be leaving to undergo gender reassignment surgery and will come back as the shop teacher "Mr. Pummelhorst," Coach Krupt, a substitute, takes her place. Every gym class, he has the students play a game called "Bombardment," which consists of him throwing dodgeballs at the students.

When Bart gets sick of the constant bullying, he fills a ball full of water and sticks it in the freezer overnight. The next day, he tries to throw the frozen ball at Coach Krupt, who ducks; the ball crashes through the window and destroys Willie's shack. When Marge picks up Bart from school and sees Willie is homeless, she offers to let him stay at their house, and he eventually accepts. When there, Lisa has Willie realize that his life could be much better, and she decides to turn him into a proper gentleman. Bart, however, does not believe that she can do it, but Lisa bets that she can in time for the school science fair.

Meanwhile, Homer comes home with his last pair of blue pants ripped and torn after his seat breaks at the go-cart track. As he searches through town for a new pair, he finds no store that sells his favorite type of pants. When he goes to the factory that sells them, the manager tells him that they do not make blue pants anymore due to poor sales thanks to a disastrous Super Bowl ad. Homer tells him that he will get more customers. He does this by writing "Buy blue pants" on the back of his head. Homer's advertising campaign pays off and soon everyone is wearing blue pants. However, Marge is annoyed when Homer begins putting other advertisements all over his body.

Lisa struggles to teach Willie how to act sophisticated. On the day before the science fair, he is still his same old self, but when he sees how disappointed Lisa is, he suddenly surprises both Bart and Lisa by correctly (and with a 'proper' accent) saying a sentence she gave him. At the science fair the next day, he impresses everyone with his politeness and verbal dexterity under the guise of G.K. Willington Esq. No one actually knows that it is the old groundskeeper until Lisa announces it to everyone. Once again, she wins the science fair, and the bet along with it.

Even though he is respected by everybody, Willie soon begins to miss his old life and feels out of place working as the maître d' at a fancy restaurant; unfortunately, both his job and his shack were taken by the music teacher. He explains to Lisa that he wishes to go back to the way things were, and she understands. Soon, he is returned to his restored "crap shack", which Lisa has decorated with a new sign on the inside wall reading "Home Sweet Home." Willie, acting very grateful for the gift, asks to be alone. Lisa understands and promptly exits the shack. Upon her leaving, Willie takes the sign and smashes it on the ground, declaring that he liked his shack "the way it was".

== Cultural references ==
The episode's plot is based on the musical play My Fair Lady and also features parodies of songs from the play such as "Wouldn't It Be Loverly", "The Rain in Spain", "I Could Have Danced All Night". The couch gag featured the claymation character Gumby from the eponymous media franchise.

== Reception ==
=== Viewing figures ===
In its first airing, the episode was watched by 9.51 million viewers.

=== Critical response ===
Ryan J. Budke of TV Squad liked the episode and thought it had more "'adult' jokes than normal". He noticed that unlike the story it parodies, Willie would not lose anything if he returned to his old lifestyle. He also thought the subplot with Homer was funny but did not have an ending.

Colin Jacobson of DVD Movie Guide liked the beginning of the episode but thought that it became "less consistent" when the My Fair Lady parody started.

On Four Finger Discount, Brendan Dando and Guy Davis enjoyed the songs and were "fairly happy with it."

"My Fair Laddy" was ranked as the twenty-fifth best The Simpsons episode by Kimberly Potts of AOL.

Eric Goldman, Dan Iverson, and Brian Zoromski of IGN named it the best episode of the seventeenth season, calling it a fun parody of My Fair Lady.

In 2014, David Ng of the Los Angeles Times named the parody of "The Rain in Spain" as one of the five greatest musical moments in the series.

In 2015, Jesse Schedeen of IGN named the couch gag as the tenth best couch gag of the series.
