= Simpsons Christmas Stories =

- The Simpsons episode
- Homer's depiction of Jesus' birth.
- Episode no.: Season 17; Episode 9
- Directed by: Steven Dean Moore
- Written by: Don Payne
- Production code: HABF01
- Original air date: December 18, 2005

Episode features
- Couch gag: A copy of The Springfield Shopper spins into frame. The headline reads, "COUCH GAG THRILLS NATION" with a photo of the Simpsons on the couch.
- Commentary: Al Jean; Matt Selman; Tim Long; Kevin Curran; J. Stewart Burns; Michael Price; Steven Dean Moore; Patric M. Verrone

Episode chronology
← Previous "The Italian Bob"	Next → "Homer's Paternity Coot"
- The Simpsons season 17

"Simpsons Christmas Stories" is the ninth episode of the seventeenth season of the American animated television series The Simpsons. It originally aired on the Fox network in the United States on December 18, 2005. The episode was written by Don Payne and directed by Steven Dean Moore

In this episode, three Christmas-related stories are told. Homer tells the story of the nativity of Jesus, Grampa tells the story of the time he met Santa Claus, and Homer tries to find a gift for Marge while Moe attempts suicide. The episode received positive reviews.

== Plot ==
=== The First D'oh-El ===
When Reverend Lovejoy cannot attend the Christmas sermon due to a horrible train wreck on his train set, Ned Flanders immediately takes over. However, when he gets a paper cut and faints, Homer decides to lead the sermon and tells the story of the first Christmas.

Mary (Marge) tells Joseph (Homer) that she is pregnant, even though she is a virgin. The angel Gabriel (Lisa) appears to them and explains that Mary is going to give birth to the Son of God. The three wise men (Dr. Hibbert, Principal Skinner, and Professor Frink) tell King Herod (Mr. Burns) that they are going to give gold, frankincense, and myrrh (which Frink is re-gifting) to the King of the Jews. When Herod assumes the gifts are for him, the men explain to him that they are for the infant. Herod becomes angry and plots to kill the baby.

At the Bethlehem Inn, the innkeeper (Moe) tells Mary and Joseph that he has plenty of rooms available with brand new carpeting. However, when Mary's water breaks, he forces them to stay in the barn. Mary successfully gives birth to baby Jesus (Bart), and the three wise men, along with the two shepherds (Lenny and Carl) come to see the baby. Joseph is upset because he is not Jesus's father, and when he drinks some wine, the baby turns it into water.

When the infant keeps crying, Mary gives him to Joseph. He entertains him by hurting himself and one of the wise men (Skinner). When baby Jesus finally falls asleep, Herod and his troops find the manger that they are staying in. They escape and trick the soldiers by putting Jesus' halo on a duck. On top of the hill, Joseph cuts down a spruce tree, and as it rolls down, the soldiers get caught in it. The soldiers, along with Herod, are arranged like ornaments on the tree, and the duck, still wearing the halo, stands on top of the tree. Mary calls it a Christmas tree, and Homer concludes his service.

=== I Saw Grampa Cussing Santa Claus ===
When Bart and Lisa find Grampa trying to stick a bear trap on top of the chimney, Grampa tells them that he is trying to get his revenge on Santa Claus. When Bart asks why, Grampa recalls how, back in World War II, he and his brother Cyrus (not mentioned before or since this episode aired) were fighting off Japanese planes, accompanied by Mr. Burns, when Cyrus got shot down. Shortly after, Grampa and Burns have their plane's wings shot off and are stranded on an island. After a few months, they see a plane in the sky, and Burns shoots it down. However, when they go over to investigate, they see that it is actually Santa Claus. They build him a new sleigh and gather up all the presents. When Santa is about to leave, Burns knocks him unconscious with a coconut and flies away in the sleigh, intent on keeping all the presents for himself.

Grampa catches up to him on Prancer, who has been left behind because Santa could not find him, and jumps on board the sleigh. After he beats Burns with a tricycle, he gives the sleigh back to Santa. As Santa leaves, he tells Grampa that he will be back in a few days. However, he never returns, and Grampa has to get off using a jet ski he made out of coconuts. Bart and Lisa believe that it is just another one of Grampa's far-fetched tales, but when they hear a thump in the den, they find that Santa is there. He tells them that Cyrus did not die, but instead crashed into Tahiti. Santa takes Grampa there, and they meet up with Cyrus and his fifteen wives. Santa explains to Grampa that he did not come back for him on the island due to his procrastination and eventually feeling embarrassed about it. When Grampa comments on Cyrus's fifteen wives and the sex he must have, Cyrus points out that they are wives, not girlfriends.

=== The Nutcracker...Sweet ===
After the children of Springfield Elementary perform The Nutcracker, everyone begins to go about their business singing to the tune of the songs from the play. This is done after mentioning that these songs are in the public domain and thus can be (and are) played constantly for free. After the opening number (sung to the tune of "Marche"), Moe continues his holiday tradition of attempting suicide (done to the tune of "Dance of the Flutes"), first by hanging himself with popcorn string which breaks under his weight, next by riding a sleigh into open traffic only to have all the cars swerve and miss him, and then by shooting himself in the head with a revolver that sends a "Merry Christmas" flag out through his other ear. In a fourth attempt, Moe asks Barney to kill him instead of buying him a present, but Barney has already gotten him a wool hat and Moe gives up on the idea for now.

That evening, Marge tells Homer that he will like the present that she got him. Having forgotten to buy her anything and not wanting to upset her, Homer tells her that his present for her is outside; he then frantically rushes out to find a gift (sung to the tune of "Trepak"). Every store is closed, and all Apu has at the Kwik-E-Mart is some jerky made out of trout. Homer searches in garbage cans, gutters, trees, and he even chases down Milhouse, but he cannot find anything.

When he gets home, Marge gives Homer his present (done to "Pas De Deux"). He opens it and sees that it is another present with a tag that reads, "To Marge, From Homer." Marge tells him that she knew that he would forget to give her a present, so she gave him one to give to her. He gives it to her and she unwraps it, and Homer sees that it is a picture of him dressed up as Santa with Marge on his lap. They hug and kiss, and Moe unsuccessfully attempts suicide a fifth time by riding a sleigh toward a fully loaded tractor-trailer.

== Reception ==
=== Viewing figures ===
The episode earned a 3.5 rating and was watched by 9.93 million viewers, which was the 21st most-watched show that week.

=== Critical response ===
Ryan Budke of TV Squad said it was a "good episode." He thought the best part of the first segment was Jesus using his powers like Jeannie from the television series I Dream of Jeannie and thought that Marge's gift to Homer in the third segment was heartwarming.

Colin Jacobson of DVD Movie Guide thought the quality of the segments differed with the first one being the best and the other two being "spottier."

On Four Finger Discount, Guy Davis and Brendan Dando liked the episode and enjoyed the variety of the different stories.

=== Awards and nominations ===
Writer Don Payne was nominated for the Writers Guild of America Award for Outstanding Writing in Animation at the 59th Writers Guild of America Awards for his script to this episode.
