= The Last of the Red Hat Mamas =

- The Simpsons episode
- Marge and Tammy (Lily Tomlin).
- Episode no.: Season 17; Episode 7
- Directed by: Matthew Nastuk
- Written by: Joel H. Cohen
- Production code: GABF22
- Original air date: November 27, 2005

Guest appearance
- Lily Tomlin as Tammy

Episode features
- Couch gag: The couch is a giant nest. A mother bird flies in and feeds Homer a worm.
- Commentary: Al Jean; Joel H. Cohen; Matt Selman; Tim Long; Marc Wilmore; Tress MacNeille; David Silverman; Jeff Westbrook

Episode chronology
← Previous "See Homer Run"	Next → "The Italian Bob"
- The Simpsons season 17

"The Last of the Red Hat Mamas" is the seventh episode of the seventeenth season of the American animated television series The Simpsons. It originally aired on the Fox Network in the United States on November 27, 2005. The episode was written by Joel H. Cohen and directed by Matthew Nastuk.

In the episode, Marge befriends a group of women called the Cheery Red Tomatoes, while Milhouse tutors Lisa in Italian. Lily Tomlin guest stars as the voice of Tammy, the leader of the group. "The Last of the Red Hat Mamas" was the second highest rated of the season with 11.5 million viewers and received mixed reviews.

== Plot ==
At Mayor Quimby's Easter egg hunt, Homer gets into a fight with the Easter Bunny mascot. Marge takes a tour of the mayor's mansion, and she and her friends are embarrassed by Homer's antics. That night, Homer feels guilty and unsuccessfully tries to find Marge new friends. Going for a walk, Marge meets a group of women called the Cheery Red Tomatoes. She befriends the leader, Tammy, and is inducted into the group.

Marge learns that the Cheery Red Tomatoes plan to steal Faberge eggs from Mr. Burns's mansion, after he ruined their fundraiser by backing out on a promised donation. She goes along with this to stay in the group, while Homer finds the heist plans and follows Marge. He mistakenly alerts the police on his way over, who catch the Cheery Red Tomatoes stealing the eggs. They flee the mansion seemingly empty-handed, but Marge reveals that she has hidden one egg in her hair, allowing the Cheery Red Tomatoes to replace the money Burns did not donate. They agree to go their separate ways and stay safe, while Homer reassures Marge that she will always have him as a special friend.

Meanwhile, Lisa seeks summer opportunities and decides on studying abroad in Rome. The only requirement Lisa has not met is to speak fluent Italian, so she hires a tutor, who turns out to be Milhouse. To Lisa's surprise, Milhouse is fluent in Italian from having spent summers with his abusive xenophobic Italian grandmother, who beat him with an olive branch for speaking English (because an American WWII soldier left her pregnant). Lisa enjoys the special time spent during her lessons and learning Italian culture, and begins to like Milhouse more, but soon comes across Milhouse tutoring another girl in the same way he taught her. Lisa berates him in perfect Italian, chasing him with an olive branch in the same manner his grandmother did.

== Production ==
Lily Tomlin guest starred as Tammy.

== Cultural references ==
The Cheery Red Tomatoes is a parody of the social organization Red Hat Society.

== Reception ==
=== Viewing figures ===
"The Last of the Red Hat Mamas" was the second highest rated of the season with 11.5 million viewers.

=== Critical response ===
Ryan J. Budke of TV Squad said the episode "seems to be embracing it's sillier side" of the series, which made him enjoy the episode. He highlighted the "kicks are for ribs" line and several sight gags.

Colin Jacobson of DVD Movie Guide did not like the plot twist involving the Tomatoes but thought the episode was "a decent show despite the missteps."

On Four Finger Discount, Brendan Dando and Guy Davis did not like that most of the episodes this season thus far featured Homer being a poor husband or father but highlighted the performance by Lily Tomlin.

== See also ==
- List of Easter television episodes
