= Homer Simpson, This Is Your Wife =

- The Simpsons episode
- Episode no.: Season 17; Episode 15
- Directed by: Matthew Nastuk
- Written by: Ricky Gervais
- Production code: HABF08
- Original air date: March 26, 2006

Guest appearances
- Ricky Gervais as Charles Heathbar; Christoph Maria Herbst as Charles Heathbar (in German version)

Episode features
- Chalkboard gag: "I will not eat things for money" (similar to "Marge vs. the Monorail") (original airing; taken from Sky One promo) "I will not laminate dog doo" (re-run airing)
- Couch gag: A live-action version of the opening sequence. (original airing; taken from Sky One promo); The Simpsons sit down on the couch. A roasting spit skewers the couch and the floor below pulls back to reveal a fiery pit. The Simpsons are then spun around over the heat. Marge's hair is soon on fire. (re-run airing)
- Commentary: Matt Groening; Al Jean; Ricky Gervais; Matt Selman; Tom Gammill; Max Pross; David Silverman

Episode chronology
← Previous "Bart Has Two Mommies"	Next → "Million Dollar Abie"
- The Simpsons season 17

"Homer Simpson, This Is Your Wife" is the fifteenth episode of the seventeenth season of the American animated television series The Simpsons. It originally aired on the Fox network in the United States on March 26, 2006, and was watched by around ten million people during that broadcast. In the episode, Homer signs the Simpson family up for a reality show in which the mothers of two families switch places. Marge gets to live with a friendly man named Charles and his perfect son, while Homer, Bart, and Lisa must spend time with Charles' strict wife Verity.

English comedian Ricky Gervais contributed to the writing of the episode and guest starred in it as Charles. As a big fan of The Simpsons, he felt it was "a dream come true." He was given the offer to write and guest star by The Simpsons creator Matt Groening, who was a fan of Gervais' British comedy series The Office. After meeting Groening and executive producer Al Jean in early 2004, Gervais set out to come up with the storyline for the episode. He was inspired by the British reality show Wife Swap. Though Gervais contributed a large part to the episode, the script was a joint effort with the regular writing staff of the show.

Gervais' performance has been praised by critics, being listed as one of the best guest appearances on The Simpsons by writers for Entertainment Weekly and The Times. Groening also liked the performance and invited Gervais to appear on the show again. The episode as a whole, however, received mixed reviews from critics. A live-action remake of the regular animated opening sequence of The Simpsons aired at the beginning of the episode, which was taken from a promo for the show's broadcast on the British television network Sky One.

== Plot ==
Lenny invites his friends in Springfield to a party at his apartment, where he has bought a brand new plasma screen high-definition television. Homer immediately falls in love with its HD picture, and begins to spend all his time at Lenny's home watching HDTV. Marge sends over Bart and Lisa to convince him to come back but they too become enthralled.

After a few days, Homer is kicked out by Lenny, and when he returns home he no longer enjoys watching his regular CRT TV, so Marge enters the family in a contest where first-place prize is a plasma HDTV. They later manage to win the third-place prize: a trip to the Fox studios. There, Homer learns of a reality show called Mother Flippers in which the mothers of two families switch places. The grand prize happens to be enough money to buy a new plasma HDTV, so the family signs up for the show.

Marge is traded to a nice, easygoing man named Charles Heathbar and his perfect son Ben, while Homer gets Charles' strict wife Verity. Charles dislikes his wife, especially for constantly telling him what to do, so he is surprised to see that Marge is understanding and kind. As Marge enjoys her time with Charles, he begins to develop an infatuation for her. Meanwhile, Homer, Bart, and Lisa are having major troubles with Verity, who disciplines them and objects to everything they do. At one point, Verity makes Bart and Homer write reports on Itchy and Scratchy and CSI: Miami.

Charles proclaims his love for Marge by song, but she explains to him that she loves Homer. After Charles expresses his despondency with his married life, including the fact that Ben is not his biological son owing to Verity having an affair, Marge tells him that he should tell his wife how he feels about her. He agrees, and decides to take Marge back to Homer and then get rid of Verity. When the two arrive in Springfield, however, Verity has already decided to leave Charles and found a new partner, Patty Bouvier, brought together by their hatred for Homer. That night Homer plays a guitar and expresses his undying love for his newly bought plasma HDTV and (to a lesser extent) Marge.

== Production ==
=== Background ===
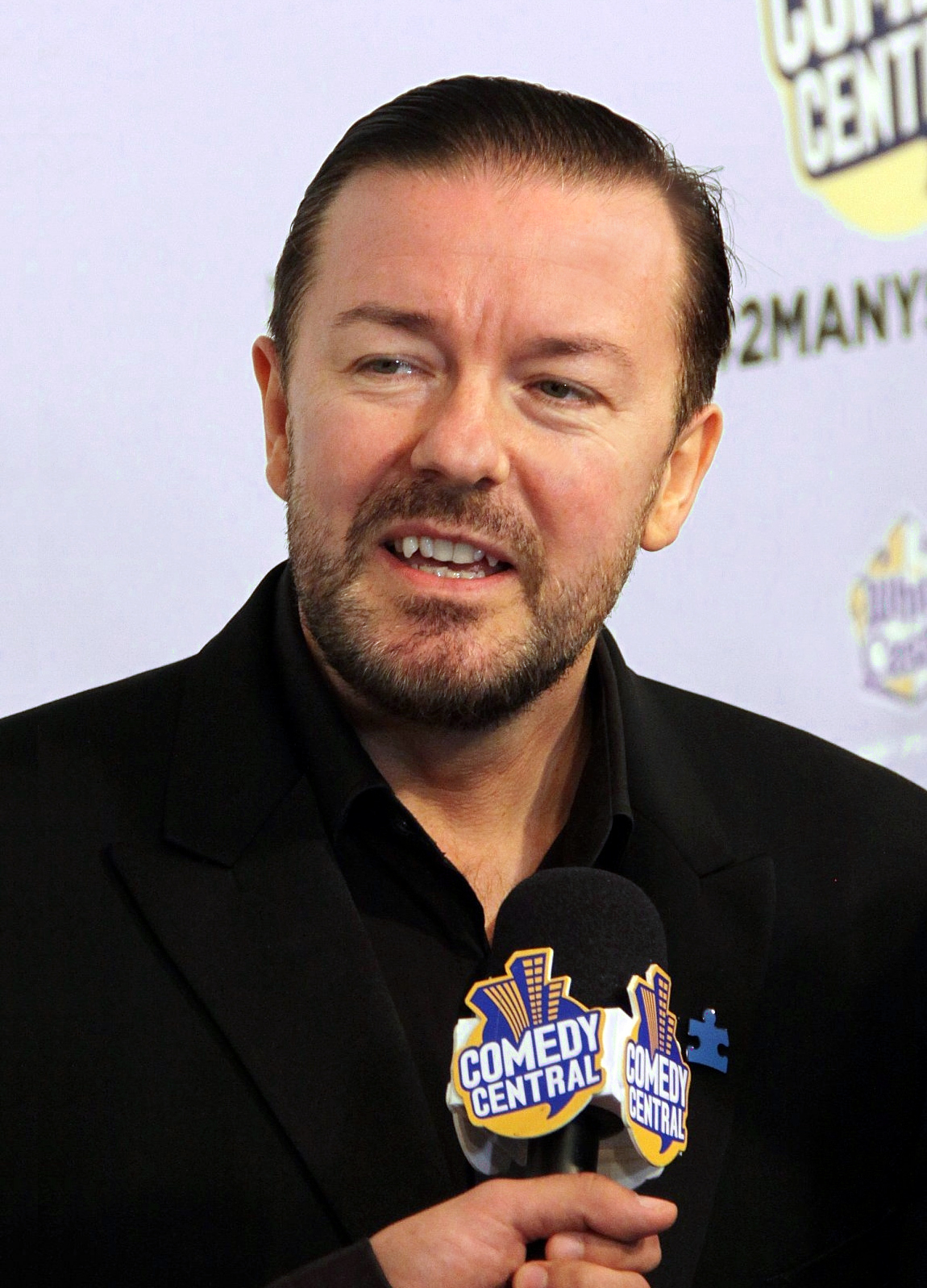
Comedian Ricky Gervais became the first person to both appear in, and write an episode of The Simpsons.

Many Simpsons staff members were fans of English comedian Ricky Gervais and his British comedy series The Office that he created and starred. In January 2004, The Simpsons creator Matt Groening called Gervais to congratulate him on his double Golden Globe win. During the phone call, Gervais was invited to lunch with Groening and executive producer Al Jean since they were big fans and wanted to meet him. At this lunch, he was offered a chance to appear in and write an episode of The Simpsons. Groening first asked Gervais for just a guest appearance, but came to the conclusion that he might be interested in writing an episode too. Gervais told The Independent that when he got the offer, "well, I knew I had to say yes, but fear kicked in at exactly the same time." He became the first person to be credited with simultaneously writing and guest-starring in an episode of The Simpsons. He was also the first Briton to write an episode for the show. As a big follower of The Simpsons, Gervais saw the experience as "a dream come true."

=== Writing process ===
After the lunch with Groening and Jean in early 2004, Gervais began coming up with a storyline. Because The Simpsons had been airing for such a long time, he found it difficult to think of a story that had not been done before. He finally based the plot on the British reality series Wife Swap after a suggestion from his girlfriend Jane Fallon, and wrote the character Charles to resemble David Brent, the character Gervais played on The Office. While working on the episode, Gervais made sure to make use of his favorite characters from The Simpsons, such as Lenny. He revealed to the press for the first time in December 2004 that he was writing an episode, commenting that "I've got the rough idea but this is the most intimidating project of my career. The Simpsons is the greatest TV show of all time." When he showed his first work to Groening and Jean, they liked it. Groening told the press that "we could never have written his character the way he did" and that "he caught our tone exactly, and then added his own Ricky Gervais/David Brent patheticness."

Although Gervais came up with the plot of the episode and wrote parts of it on his own, the whole writing team of The Simpsons worked on the script and pitched ideas, as is done with all episodes. Gervais has said in interviews that he thinks he received too much credit for writing the episode, claiming he merely sent his plot ideas, along with some written scenes, to Jean through email, and it was then the staff of the show that "made it look like a Simpsons script." He commented in a Dazed & Confused article that "I'm going to get the credit, but I think everyone in the industry knows it was a joint effort." One of the scenes that Gervais wrote himself was Charles' love song for Marge, which later appeared on the 2007 soundtrack album The Simpsons: Testify.

"Matt Groening rang me up because he'd seen The Office on a flight, ages before it was shown in America. I did a very rough sketch and wrote a song. So the only things that were mine were the song, a couple of jokes and the Wife Swap idea, which was Jane's anyway. So I mustn't take too much credit – I said as much once, but they said no, no, that's always the case. Whoever it says 'wrote' the episode goes through the same process. So that made me feel slightly less guilty."

— Ricky Gervais, The Guardian interview from 2007

=== Impact ===
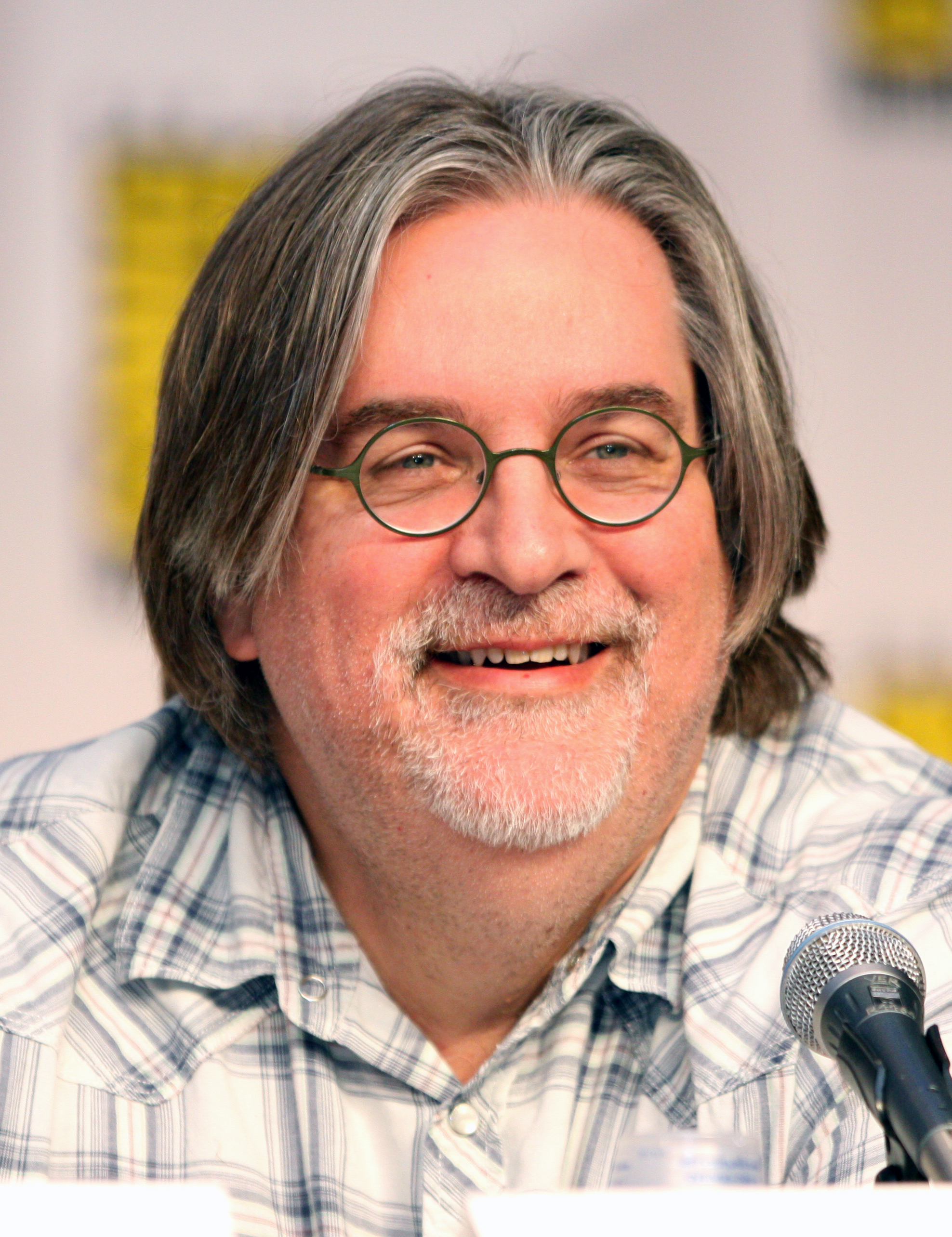
The Simpsons creator Matt Groening enjoyed Gervais' performance.

When asked in an interview if the Simpsons staff learned anything from the experience of having Gervais contribute to the show, Groening said they found out "that we could stay true to The Simpsons' sensibility, with high-velocity visual gags, but also honor what Ricky does with subtlety and nuance." Jean added that "there was a scene with Ricky and Julie Kavner [who plays Marge], which was longer than scenes we normally do, and slower-paced, but it got a bigger laugh." According to Don Kaplan, writing for the New York Post, Gervais said to a British newspaper in late 2005 that as a result of working on The Simpsons and other American shows, his connection with American television is deeper than his connection with British television.

In July 2007, Groening stated that he would like to see Gervais appear on the show again because the staff enjoyed his performance. He also said that Gervais could decide himself if he wanted to return as Charles or a new character, should he choose to lend his voice again. Gervais did make another guest appearance on the show in an episode entitled "Angry Dad: The Movie" that was broadcast in the United States on February 20, 2011. This time he played himself.

== Release ==
"Homer Simpson, This Is Your Wife" was originally broadcast on the Fox network in the United States on March 26, 2006. With a total of 10.09 million viewers, the episode finished 38th in the ratings for the week of March 20–26, 2006. It was the seventh highest-rated broadcast on the Fox network that week. During the episode's first airing in the United Kingdom on April 23, 2006, it was watched by 2.18 million people. At the time, this made it the second most-watched broadcast in the history of Sky1, after a Friends episode from 2000 that drew 2.8 million viewers. The large number of viewers of "Homer Simpson, This Is Your Wife" was the result of Gervais' involvement—new episodes of the show were usually seen by approximately one million people on Sky1 at the time.

Instead of the usual animated opening sequence that is played in front of The Simpsons episodes, this episode began with a live-action opening sequence. The sequence, which mirrors the normal opening but with real-life actors and locations, was originally created by British Sky Broadcasting for Sky One's promotion of The Simpsons. The live-action opening had already become an Internet hit before it was aired in front of "Homer Simpson, This Is Your Wife", and it was Groening's decision to use it. Jean commented in a press statement that he was "just amazed there are people who want to be known for looking like the Simpsons." The usual opening sequence is used for re-runs of the episode and on the season 17 DVD and Blu-ray release.

=== Critical reception ===
Gervais has been praised by critics for his performance in the episode. In a 2012 article, Mike Bruno of Entertainment Weekly named Gervais one of the 21 best The Simpsons guest stars, and in 2007 Simon Crerar of The Times listed the performance as one of the funniest cameos in the history of the show. Gervais' character Charles was cited by The Guardian's Johnny Dee as one of the most memorable characters from The Simpsons. The episode, on the other hand, has received mixed response. Larissa Dubecki of The Age gave it a negative review, commenting that "this cross-pollination of stellar US and British comedies [The Simpsons and The Office] gives rise to great expectations but there's a massive letdown in store for anyone hoping for something approaching even the middling efforts of the two comedic benchmarks." She added that "this effort proves that The Office and The Simpsons are the comedic equivalent of oil and water, with the former's wry observational style sitting oddly with the latter's pop-culture pie-eating competition."

Dee was more positive, writing that he "enjoyed it very much" and that "there were some lovely gags." He noted, however, that he felt it took slightly too much time to set up the episode, though after the wife swap, "it marched along." The Times critic Dominic Maxwell thought the "languid timing that Gervais brings to Extras and The Office was wrong here. Simpsons cameos are normally lean, but Gervais's shtick ran rampant through the second half, turning the regulars into extras." Maxwell did find the episode fairly entertaining though, stating that "it was a decent late-period Simpsons episode" and that it featured "some fine jokes." He concluded that "even a middling Simpsons episode is still bright and tight and brilliantly rendered. So even if this one didn’t really work, it was still a lot more fun than a lot of [other things on television] that do."
