= The Italian Bob =

- The Simpsons episode
- Episode no.: Season 17; Episode 8
- Directed by: Mark Kirkland
- Written by: John Frink
- Production code: HABF02
- Original air date: December 11, 2005

Guest appearances
- Maria Grazia Cucinotta as Francesca; Kelsey Grammer as Sideshow Bob

Episode features
- Chalkboard gag: "That one's more jazzy"
- Couch gag: A pair of cartoon hands deal out a wild royal flush, consisting of the jack of diamonds (Bart), the queen of diamonds (Marge), the king of diamonds (Homer), the ace of diamonds (Lisa), and the joker (Maggie).
- Commentary: Matt Groening; Al Jean; John Frink; Ian Maxtone-Graham; Matt Selman; Marc Wilmore; Tom Gammill; Dan Castellaneta; Kelsey Grammer; Mark Kirkland; David Silverman

Episode chronology
← Previous "The Last of the Red Hat Mamas"	Next → "Simpsons Christmas Stories"
- The Simpsons season 17

"The Italian Bob" is the eighth episode of the seventeenth season of the American animated television series The Simpsons. It first aired on the Fox network in the United States on December 11, 2005. This episode was written by John Frink and directed by Mark Kirkland.

In this episode, the Simpsons go to Italy to pick up Mr. Burns' new car and encounter Sideshow Bob after the car is involved in a collision. Serving as a sequel to "The Great Louse Detective", it features Kelsey Grammer in his ninth appearance as Sideshow Bob and is the first time the Simpsons visit Italy. Maria Grazia Cucinotta also guest starred. The episode received mixed reviews. Grammer won the Primetime Emmy Award for Outstanding Voice-Over Performance for his performance in this episode. Frink won the Writers Guild of America Award for Television: Animation for his script to this episode.

The episode's title is a reference to the 1969 British caper film The Italian Job. Among the locations the Simpsons visit in this episode are Pisa, Pompeii, Tuscany, Rome and Venice.

== Plot ==
After Mr. Burns gets teased about his old car by the kids at Springfield Elementary School, he sends Homer Simpson to pick up a brand new Lamborgotti Fasterossa car in Italy. The Simpsons fly over on Alitalia, and tour the country. After a huge wheel of mortadella lands on their car and crushes the hood, they push it into a small fictional Tuscan village called Salsiccia (sausage), and are told that the mayor speaks English.

The Simpsons visit the mayor, who turns out to be Sideshow Bob, who is equally shocked to see them. Bob explains that after his last attempt to kill Bart, he decided to get a fresh start in Italy. He helped the villagers crush grapes into wine using his enormous feet, and they elected him mayor. A reformed Bob introduces the Simpsons to his wife, Francesca Terwilliger, and his son, Gino. Bob begs the Simpsons not to tell anyone about his past crimes and arranges to have the car fixed.

One month later, Bob hosts a farewell party for the Simpson family. Lisa gets drunk on wine and spouts off about Bob being an attempted murderer. He leads her away from the table, but as she stumbles backwards, she rips off his suit to reveal his prison uniform. Upon this revelation, the village sacks Bob as Mayor. Bob swears a murderous vendetta on the Simpsons. The family flees in the fixed car, but Bob follows on a motorcycle. Homer drives into a ditch and onto a Roman aqueduct, landing on top of Trajan's Column in the Roman Forum. Bob's wife and son catch up with him. Francesca professes her love and loyalty to Bob and offers to help him take revenge.

The Simpsons are left with no car and no money. Lisa spots a bus with a poster advertising Krusty the Clown's performance in the opera Pagliacci. They meet up with him at the Colosseum in Rome, and he puts them in as extras. Bob, Francesca, and Gino find them and corner them on the stage while Krusty flees through a trap door. Lisa warns the audience that the Terwilligers are about to actually kill her and the family, but Bob tricks the audience by performing the climax of Vesti la giubba. Before Bob and his family can kill the Simpsons, Krusty's limousine picks them up; Krusty needs them to smuggle an ancient artefact back to America. The Terwilligers are disappointed at first, but then walk away plotting revenge together.

== Production ==
Maria Grazia Cucinotta guest starred as Sideshow Bob's wife Francesca. Tress MacNeille voiced the role of Bob's son Gino.

== Reception ==
=== Viewing figures ===
The episode earned a 3.7 rating and was watched by 10.30 million viewers, the 28th most-watched show that week.

=== Critical response ===
Ryan J. Budke of TV Squad said the episode was funny but did not like the abrupt ending with Sideshow Bob singing. He highlighted the joke of Peter Griffin from the television series Family Guy being accused of plagiarism and Stan Smith from the television series American Dad! being accused of plagiarizing plagiarism.

Colin Jacobson of DVD Movie Guide said while Sideshow Bob episodes are usually good, this episode "doesn't live up to those heights, but it manages to mostly work well."

On Four Finger Discount, Brendan Dando and Guy Davis enjoyed the episode, saying the episode with the Simpsons traveling abroad had a story that made sense and liked that it "poked fun" of the Italian stereotypes.

In 2009, Robert Canning of IGN placed "The Italian Bob" last on his list of the "Top 10 Sideshow Bob Episodes". At that time, ten episodes revolving around the character had aired. Canning wrote that the episode "falls lowest in the ranking for a few reasons, but the biggest of these is the fact that Bob had no intention of killing Bart. Plus we're in Italy. Plus Bob is married and has a son. All the things we love about a Sideshow Bob episode—the vengeance, the familiar settings and characters, the elaborate scheming—were missing from this half-hour. Without it, Bob wasn't nearly as entertaining, and the episode didn't result in a whole lot of laughs."

In 2022, Lloyd Farley of Collider ranked the episode last out of 15 Sideshow Bob episodes. He said that it lacked Bob's schemes and intentions to kill Bart, which what makes Sideshow Bob's episodes special.

=== Awards and nominations ===
Kelsey Grammer won the Primetime Emmy Award for Outstanding Voice-Over Performance at the 58th Primetime Creative Arts Emmy Awards for his voice portrayal of Sideshow Bob in this episode. This marks the third time a credited guest star for the show has won an Emmy, the other two being Marcia Wallace and Jackie Mason although Wallace and Mason both won theirs as a joint win with the rest of the main cast the first time the category was awarded in 1992.

John Frink won the Writers Guild of America Award for Outstanding Writing in Animation at the 59th Writers Guild of America Awards for his script to this episode.
