= Marge and Homer Turn a Couple Play =

- The Simpsons episode
- Shocked, Bart watches Tabitha Vixx's pole dancing in the promotional image.
- Episode no.: Season 17; Episode 22
- Directed by: Bob Anderson
- Written by: Joel H. Cohen
- Production code: HABF16
- Original air date: May 21, 2006

Guest appearances
- Mandy Moore as Tabitha Vixx; Stacy Keach as Howard K. Duff

Episode features
- Chalkboard gag: "Have a great summer, everyone"
- Couch gag: The Simpsons' couch attacks them, and they flee to street, where they see everyone's furniture attacking them.
- Commentary: Al Jean; Joel H. Cohen; Matt Selman; Tim Long; Marc Wilmore; David Silverman; Jeff Westbrook

Episode chronology
← Previous "The Monkey Suit"	Next → "The Mook, the Chef, the Wife and Her Homer"
- The Simpsons season 17

"Marge and Homer Turn a Couple Play" is the twenty-second and the final episode of the seventeenth season of the American animated television series The Simpsons. It originally aired on the Fox network in the United States on May 21, 2006. The episode was written by Joel H. Cohen and directed by Bob Anderson.

In this episode, Marge and Homer help save the marriage of a baseball player and his singer wife. Mandy Moore and Stacy Keach guest starred. The episode received mixed reviews.

== Plot ==
The Springfield Isotopes are currently in first place thanks to their acquisition of Buck Mitchell. During a game at Isotope Stadium, Buck's singer wife Tabitha Vixx sings the first few bars of The Star-Spangled Banner, then strips down to lingerie and launches into a lascivious performance of one of her own songs. Buck, humiliated, delivers a terrible performance during the game, causing the crowd to jeer him. He later sees Homer and Marge kissing on the Jumbo-Vision. Later that night, Buck shows up at the Simpsons' front door and asks for help with his marriage in exchange for season tickets. Marge doubts their ability to counsel other couples. Her doubts lead to her and Homer flirting, which Buck sees as an example of what he wants with his own wife.

At the first session, Buck confesses he assumed Tabitha would give up her recording career to focus on his minor league baseball career, to which she responds she will not stay in a mismatched marriage. When Buck says he wants Tabitha to stop flaunting her body and Homer compliments it, Marge stops the session. At the next session, they discuss ways to keep their romance alive, which is successful. As a result, Buck's game returns to superior form. Tabitha continues her concert tour, and Homer comes to check on her in her dressing room. There, he gives her a neck rub while he eats fried chicken. Her loud moans and Homer's praise of the fried chicken are overheard through the door by Buck, who misinterprets them, so he enters and punches Homer.

With his marriage troubled again, Buck plays poorly. Homer wants to get them back together, but Marge refuses to help due to his behavior. Later, Tabitha tells Marge that she plans to leave Buck. Marge tells her not to admit defeat. During Buck's next game, Homer hijacks the Duff blimp and spells out a message to Buck, supposedly from Tabitha, proclaiming her love. Buck, reinvigorated, hits the baseball into the blimp, causing it to deflate and crash onto the field. As Homer runs from the wreckage alone, Buck realizes Tabitha was not involved. He threatens Homer with his bat, but Marge dissuades him by saying that Homer was trying to help and that marriage is hard work but worth it. Tabitha comes on the Jumbo-Vision to tell Buck she wants to stay together, and he agrees.

== Production ==
The numbers on the stadium scoreboard, shown to guess the attendance, are examples of a perfect number, a narcissistic number and a Mersenne prime. The original numbers were different. After mathematics professors Sarah J. Greenwald and Andrew Nestler attended a table read for the episode in August 2005, producer Ian Maxtone-Graham suggested changing the numbers in their honor to "more interesting mathematical numbers". They were "thrilled" to see the new numbers in the episode while attending a scoring session for the episode in May 2006.

Mandy Moore guest starred as Tabitha Vixx.

== Reception ==
=== Viewing figures ===
The episode earned a 2.9 rating and was watched by 8.22 million viewers, which was the 42nd most-watched show that week.

=== Critical response ===
Colin Jacobson of DVD Movie Guide said the episode "delivers a reasonable array of laughs, but it never quite excels."

Adam Finley of TV Squad said the "episode did have me cracking up a few times, as a whole I felt it could have been better."

On Four Finger Discount, Brendan Dando and Guy Davis liked the episode, highlighting Mandy Moore's performance, and were relieved the plot did not involve Homer and Marge fighting.

=== Themes and analysis ===
Sociologist Tim Delaney wrote that the episode illustrates the bandwagon effect: interest by fairweather fans drives further popularity of the Isotopes as they win, and they lose their popularity during slumps.

Physicist Simon Singh wrote that the episode's throwaway use of Mersenne primes and other mathematical concepts is an example of Simpsons writers, many of whom have a strong math background, adding bonus math jokes for others who can recognize them.
