= The Wettest Stories Ever Told =

- The Simpsons episode
- Episode no.: Season 17; Episode 18
- Directed by: Mike B. Anderson
- Written by: Jeff Westbrook
- Production code: HABF11
- Original air date: April 23, 2006

Episode features
- Couch gag: Homer solves a jigsaw puzzle of the family, placing Maggie and his heads in the wrong positions and saying "D'oh!", and then immediately fixing the mistake and giggling.
- Commentary: Al Jean; Jeff Westbrook; Matt Selman; Tom Gammill; Max Pross; Mike B. Anderson; David Silverman

Episode chronology
← Previous "Kiss Kiss, Bang Bangalore"	Next → "Girls Just Want to Have Sums"
- The Simpsons season 17

"The Wettest Stories Ever Told" is the eighteenth episode of the seventeenth season of the American animated television series The Simpsons. It originally aired on the Fox network in the United States on April 23, 2006. The episode was written by Jeff Westbrook and directed by Mike B. Anderson.

In this episode, three stories are told about life aboard ships at sea. The episode was watched by 7.1 million viewers and received mixed reviews from critics.

== Plot ==
When the Simpsons' plans for an outing at the Frying Dutchman turns into a disaster due to an uncooperative octopus, the family tells three nautically themed stories to pass the time.

=== Mayflower Madman ===
In Lisa's story, Bart, Lisa and a widowed Marge board the Mayflower to head for the new world. Homer, fleeing from the police, boards the ship and hides in a barrel. Homer is attracted to Marge. However, Moe is jealous of their friendship. Moe takes Homer down to the storage room to play a drinking game. Homer and the crew get drunk, and Moe claims that Homer is responsible, leading Captain "Flandish" (Flanders) and Reverend Lovejoy to place him in a stock.

A storm approaches, and Flandish is knocked unconscious. Homer volunteers to take his place, and leads them safely out of the storm. Homer and Marge get together, and the members of the Mayflower meet the Wampanoag tribe and join them for the first Thanksgiving feast.

=== The Whine-Bar Sea ===
In Bart's story, the Bounty sets sail from England in 1789, commanded by Captain Bligh (Seymour Skinner). During the voyage, Bligh severely mistreats his crew. Willie warns him of a mutiny if he continues, but Bligh ignores him. They arrive in Tahiti, where Homer and Marge are the rulers of the island and have a wonderful time.

Bligh continues to abuse the crew, leading First Mate Bart Christian to mutiny and sending Bligh and Willie off in a lifeboat. Bart, as the new Captain, orders the crews to set sail for Tahiti, but after throwing away the ship's wheel, they end up in Antarctica.

=== Watership D'ohn (aka, The Neptune Adventure) ===
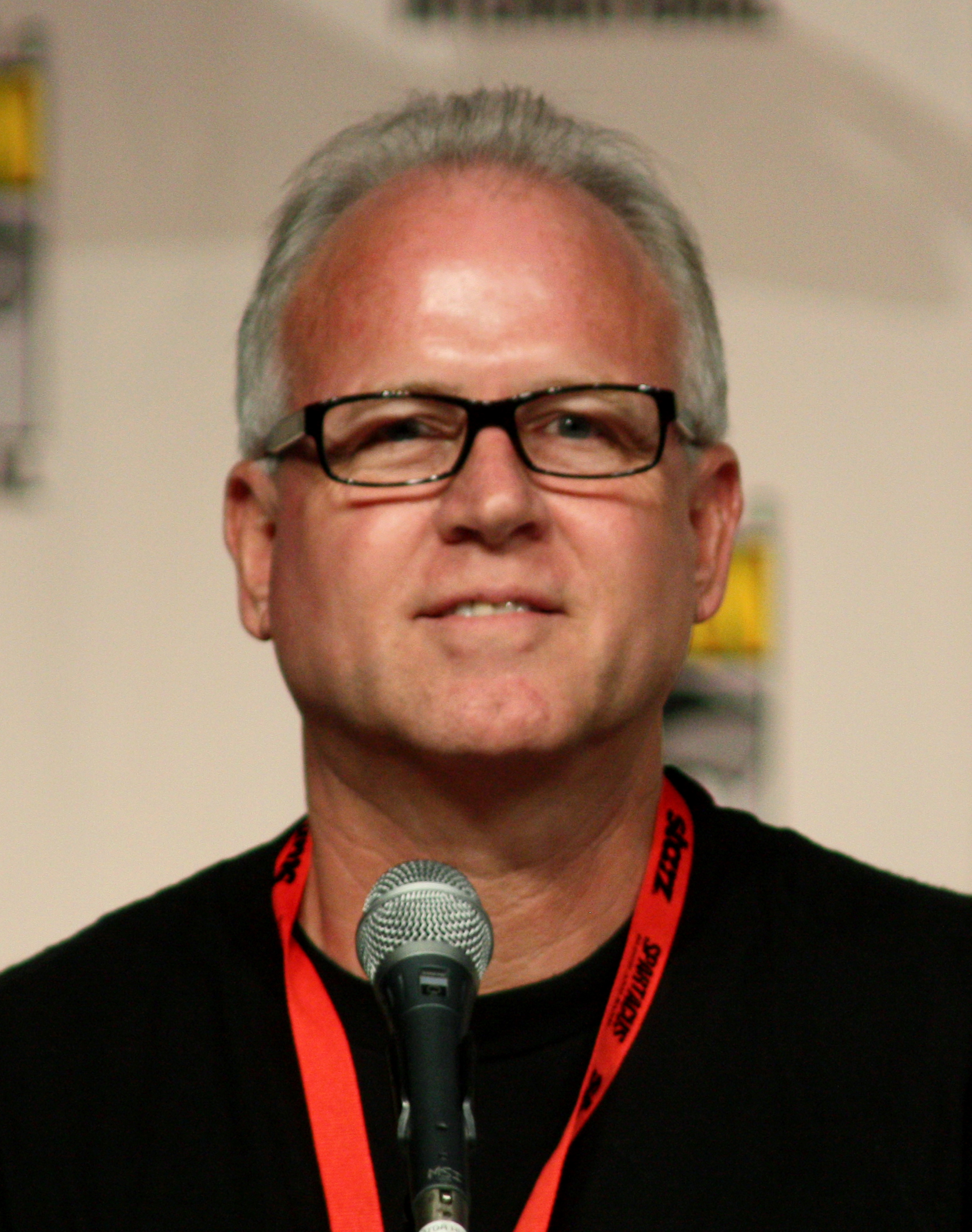
Mike B. Anderson directed the episode.

Homer tells a story taking place on the ocean liner S.S. Neptune on New Year's Eve during the 1970s. At midnight, Captain Burns fails to notice a massive freak wave, which hits the bridge, capsizing the ship and killing most of the passengers. Led by Selma, the survivors climb up the decks to the engine room, during which Lenny falls to his death, saying that it is "too confusing" to carry on.

Comic Book Guy swims through a flooded deck to help the others get to the engine room, but he has a heart attack and drowns. The group makes it to the engine room and are rescued, but Sideshow Mel is killed when he is accidentally set on fire by one of the rescue crew welding a hole in the ship. Once outside the ship, the survivors encounter the skeletons of the Bounty crew, who are still trying to get back to Tahiti.

== Cultural references ==
The first story is a parody of the voyage of the Pilgrims to North America. The second story is a parody of the Mutiny on the Bounty. The title of "The Whine-Bar Sea" references a Homeric epithet "wine-dark sea", which has also been used by nautical adventure authors such as Patrick O'Brian's 1993 novel The Wine-Dark Sea. The third story is a parody of the 1972 film The Poseidon Adventure. The title of "Watership D'ohn" references the novel Watership Down.

== Reception ==
=== Viewing figures ===
In its original airing, the episode earned a 2.5 rating and was watched by 7.1 million viewers, which was the 53rd most-watched show that week.

=== Critical response ===
Adam Finley of TV Squad said the episode "wasn't great, but I think it had enough good moments for me not to write if off completely." He thought the first story was the weakest and liked the second story.

Colin Jacobson of DVD Movie Guide said the episode was "inconsistent" and had few jokes.

On Four Finger Discount, Guy Davis and Brendan said it was "one of the weakest episodes ever told" despite a good writer and director for the episode.

=== Themes and analysis ===
The second story has been cited as depicting the canoe greeting trope of Polynesians welcoming Europeans to the Pacific islands as shown in the American South Seas film genre.
