= See Homer Run =

- The Simpsons episode
- Episode no.: Season 17; Episode 6
- Directed by: Nancy Kruse
- Written by: Stephanie Gillis
- Production code: GABF21
- Original air date: November 20, 2005

Episode features
- Couch gag: The Simpsons sit on the couch as normal. The camera zooms out to reveal that they are a part of a zoo on Kang and Kodos' home planet, Rigel VII, as an "Earth Family" exhibit.
- Commentary: Al Jean; Stephanie Gillis; Tom Gammill; Max Pross; David Silverman

Episode chronology
← Previous "Marge's Son Poisoning"	Next → "The Last of the Red Hat Mamas"
- The Simpsons season 17

"See Homer Run" is the sixth episode of the seventeenth season of the American animated television series The Simpsons. It originally aired on the Fox network in the United States on November 20, 2005. The episode was written by Stephanie Gillis and directed by Nancy Kruse.

In this episode, Homer tries to find a way to reconcile with Lisa after he ruins her Father's Day gift, and circumstances lead to him running for mayor. Themes of the episode include references to the lesser of two evils principle and the 2003 California gubernatorial recall election. The episode was watched by 10.31 million viewers and received mixed reviews.

== Plot ==
On Father's Day, Homer is unimpressed with Lisa's gift, a book she created with caricatures of herself and Homer as unicorns. Trying to make Lisa feel better, he hangs the book on the refrigerator, but it falls into the refrigerator's water dispenser and gets wet and ruined. When Homer blames the magnet for causing the book to get ruined, this only makes Lisa more upset as the magnet was a gift for his birthday, much to Homer's distraught.

Lisa takes out her frustrations at school, leading her into trouble, and her parents are called to talk with Principal Skinner. The school psychiatrist Dr. J. Loren Pryor determines Lisa is going through a developmental condition spurned by Homer's antics and could wind up with a hatred for men for the rest of her life, which can only be resolved by Homer trying to make amends for everything. He dresses up as The Safety Salamander, a mascot meant to warn children about electrical power lines, but, on the school bus, he causes myriad dental injuries when he has Otto stop the bus promptly. Later, he creates a fireworks display during a school assembly that causes a massive fire in the auditorium.

Meanwhile, Bart—on a dare from the bullies, who plant the idea in his head that he is allowed to steal public property that has his name on it—steals a "Bart Boulevard" street sign. This leads to a fiery multi-vehicle pileup. Homer, still dressed in his Safety Salamander costume, runs to the rescue, extracting people who are trapped in their cars. Homer gets a rousing reception, and Mayor Quimby is blamed for the bumbling response. Springfield's residents criticize Quimby for his many other failures and demand a recall election.

On Lisa's suggestion, Homer decides to run for mayor against candidates numbering more than 200, playing on his popularity as the Safety Salamander, and builds a huge lead in the polls. However, after Marge washes Homer's salamander costume after he vomits in it, it falls apart during a debate forum, and the crowd turns on him. To make things worse, none of the new candidates gain 5% of the master vote needed to defeat Quimby, who maintains his job as Mayor. Despite the setbacks, Lisa confides in Homer that she is proud of him and is glad he is her father. They then dance in the deserted ballroom.

== Themes and analysis ==
In a reference to the "lesser of two evils" justification the public often give when voting for a political party, Homer's campaign slogan for Springfield mayor is "the lesser of 25 evils".

Laughing Matters: Humor and American Politics in the Media Age cites the episode to illustrate an example of "it's only funny because it's true" humour. In the episode Mayor Quimby undergoes a recall election that includes hundreds of questionably-qualified candidates, one of which is Rainer Wolfcastle. This obscure joke references actor and bodybuilder Arnold Schwarzenegger on whom Wolfcastle is based, who won the 2003 California gubernatorial recall election when incumbent governor Gray Davis was recalled. Laughing Matters notes that "[w]hile the plot of the episode is about lack of citizen efficacy and the power of name recognition and popularity, the sophisticated humor for a few serves little comedic purpose."

== Reception ==
=== Viewing figures ===
The episode earned a 3.7 rating and was watched by 10.31 million viewers, which was the 37th most-watched show that week.

=== Critical response ===
Colin Jacobson of DVD Movie Guide said it was a "clever episode" with some foreshadowing of the 2016 United States presidential election.

On Four Finger Discount, Guy Davis and Brendan Dando did not like that an episode focused on Homer and Lisa changed to a political episode with a salamander costume as a distraction. They would have preferred a full episode focused on politics.

The Simpsons: An Uncensored, Unauthorized History cites the episode as an example of "increasingly explicit social and political commentary [that] we are now clubbed over the head with" in the Jean era. It says the "single contemporary subject" the episode revolves around is "electoral politics".

=== Awards and nominations ===
Stephanie Gillis was nominated for the Writers Guild of America Award for Outstanding Writing in Animation at the 58th Writers Guild of America Awards for her script to this episode.
