= Regarding Margie =

- The Simpsons episode
- Episode no.: Season 17; Episode 20
- Directed by: Mike Frank Polcino
- Written by: Marc Wilmore
- Production code: HABF13
- Original air date: May 7, 2006

Guest appearances
- Sal Bando as himself; Gene Tenace as himself; Marcia Wallace as Edna Krabappel

Episode features
- Chalkboard gag: "I will not leak the plot of the movie"
- Couch gag: Five Transformer action figures line up in front of the couch and turn into the Simpsons.
- Commentary: Al Jean; Marc Wilmore; Matt Selman; Tim Long; Max Pross; Mike Frank Polcino; Raymond S. Persi

Episode chronology
← Previous "Girls Just Want to Have Sums"	Next → "The Monkey Suit"
- The Simpsons season 17

"Regarding Margie" is the twentieth episode of the seventeenth season of the American animated television series The Simpsons. It originally aired on the Fox network in the United States on May 7, 2006. The episode was written by Marc Wilmore and directed by Mike Frank Polcino.

In this episode, Marge gets amnesia and fails to remember Homer. Former baseball players Sal Bando and Gene Tenace appeared as themselves. The episode received mixed reviews.

== Plot ==
To earn money, Bart and his friends Milhouse and Nelson go around the neighborhood spray-painting people's addresses on their curbs and making them pay for the unsolicited service. This works on Moe and Ned Flanders, but when Homer refuses to pay, they leave with only the first two digits painted. The following day, a mail carrier brings Homer and Marge the wrong mail after reading their curb. Homer receives steaks and an invitation to a wedding, while Marge gets a letter claiming that she has won a contest, with the prize being a maid cleaning her house for a day. Fearing that she will be judged for having a dirty house, Marge cleans until it is spotless, except for a small stain on the kitchen floor. She combines all of her different cleaners, but passes out from the fumes and hits her head on a stool.

Marge wakes up in the hospital and is told that she has amnesia, and does not remember her family. When she returns home, the environment quickly jogs her memory of her children, in addition to Flanders and Milhouse. Homer is still a stranger to her due to her mind blocking out an unpleasant memory. Homer tries to remind Marge who he is, but she is left disturbed and disgusted, and forces him out of the house.

Sensing a chance to get Homer out of her life for good, Patty and Selma take Marge to a speed dating event, and she meets a man who shares her interests. When Marge tells him that she has amnesia and three kids, he immediately leaves. Homer, who's covered in seaweed after being splashed by the ocean while spying on Marge and her date, scolds the man for leaving her, saying that she is the most beautiful woman he will ever meet. Marge tells Homer that even though she may not remember him, he knows the most wonderful things about her. As they drive back home, Homer mentions beer, and she suddenly remembers him through his alcoholic tendencies.

== Production ==
Former baseball players Sal Bando and Gene Tenace appeared as themselves. They were depicted as members of the 1974 Oakland Athletics. Bando recorded his lines in Milwaukee while Tenace recorded his lines in Bend, Oregon. Producer Tim Long directed Tenace and named his line as one of his favorites.

== Cultural references ==
The title of the episode is a reference to the 1991 film Regarding Henry in which the main character loses his memory.

== Reception ==
=== Viewing figures ===
The episode earned a 3.0 rating and was watched by 8.47 million viewers, which was the 42nd most-watched show that week.

=== Critical response ===
Adam Finley of TV Squad thought the episode was a repeat of previous plots where Homer and Marge have a conflict until Homer learns to devote himself to Marge. He thought there was some good jokes such as the one featuring the 1974 Oakland Athletics and the one where Marge is asked how many fingers are in the jar.

Colin Jacobson of DVD Movie Guide enjoyed the "sweet and sentimental" nature of the episode as well as the jokes.

On Four Finger Discount, Brendan Dando liked the episode because it featured the best version of Homer in the season until the final moment. However, Guy Davis did not like the episode. He felt Homer was not trying to reconcile with Marge out of love but because he was the only one she forgot.
