= Girls Just Want to Have Sums =

- The Simpsons episode
- Promotional Artwork for "Girls Just Want To Have Sums".
- Episode no.: Season 17; Episode 19
- Directed by: Nancy Kruse
- Written by: Matt Selman
- Production code: HABF12
- Original air date: April 30, 2006

Guest appearances
- Frances McDormand as Melanie Upfoot; Marcia Wallace as Edna Krabappel

Episode features
- Couch gag: The living room is dark, with many eyes present. The lights go up, and many secondary characters appear behind a banner that reads, "Surprise!" The Simpsons come in and the characters yell, "SURPRISE!" Homer is so overwhelmed with shock, he has a heart attack and collapses.
- Commentary: Al Jean; Matt Selman; Dan Greaney; Tom Gammill; Max Pross; Nancy Kruse; Mark Kirkland; David Silverman

Episode chronology
| ← Previous "The Wettest Stories Ever Told" | Next → "Regarding Margie" |
- The Simpsons season 17

"Girls Just Want to Have Sums" is the nineteenth episode of the seventeenth season of the American animated television series The Simpsons. It originally aired on the Fox network in the United States on April 30, 2006. The episode was written by Matt Selman and directed by Nancy Kruse.

In this episode, a new school principal decides to segregating boys and girls classes, and Lisa is dissatisfied with the New Age-based girls math class. So, she disguises herself as a boy called Jake Boyman to infiltrate the boys' classroom to be admitted to the actual math class, and Bart mistakes his camouflaged sister as a new friend. Frances McDormand guest starred as Melanie Upfoot.

== Plot ==
The Simpsons go to see the opening night of the new Itchy & Scratchy musical Stab-A-Lot, a parody of the long running Broadway musical, The Lion King. At the end, Juliana Kellner, the show's director and former student of Springfield Elementary School, greets the reception along with Principal Skinner, who acknowledges Juliana's straight As at the school but attributes her "B or two" in math to being a girl. Skinner's attempts to defend himself make the situation worse and he is booed by the crowd and beaten by the performers.

The next day, the teachers of Springfield Elementary stage a protest outside the school. Skinner holds a conference to address the protest. Nothing he says or does appeases the women, and he eventually collapses from exhaustion. Superintendent Chalmers introduces a new principal, Melanie Upfoot, whilst Skinner is demoted to serving as Groundskeeper Willie's assistant. Upfoot segregates the school across gender lines. Lisa initially looks forward to the all-girls school, but discovers Upfoot's math lessons are New Age. Lisa infiltrates the boys' school, where actual math is being taught. Lisa disguises herself as a boy named Jake Boyman and attends the boys' school, where she gets nicknamed "Toilet". After Lisa inadvertently gets into a fight with Nelson, Bart vows to help her blend into the boys' school.

Lisa is accepted by the boys, and is recognized for her performance in math. She then reveals her true identity. Bart claims she only did well because she learned to think like a boy. In response, she throws her award at him, which ends up hitting Ralph Wiggum, and is shocked at her violent behavior. Lisa ends her speech by saying how proud she is of her feminism and her intelligence.

== Production ==
In 2005, Lawrence Summers, who was President of Harvard University at the time, made "ill-advised remarks" regarding the reason why there were fewer women than men in the fields of science and mathematics. In response, the producers created this episode featuring Principal Skinner making similar remarks. However, they did not want to end the episode with "a simplistic or glib conclusion" or get into the same controversy that Skinner did. Because they had difficulty creating an ending, they concluded the episode by having Dewey Largo interrupt Lisa as she is about to give her opinion about why there are fewer women than men in science and mathematics. The title of the episode refers to the Cyndi Lauper song "Girls Just Want to Have Fun".

In a conversation with Sarah J. Greenwald, producer Jeff Westbrook said he and producer J. Stewart Burns spent half an hour attempting to fit the Seven Bridges of Königsberg mathematics problem into a joke in the episode but were unsuccessful. Executive producer Al Jean cited this episode as him advocating for more girls joining the field of physical sciences.

Frances McDormand guest starred as Melanie Upfoot.

== Reception ==
=== Viewing figures ===
The episode earned a 3.1 rating and was watched by 8.74 millions viewers, which was the 41st most-watched show that week.

=== Critical reception ===
Colin Jacobson of DVD Movie Guide said, "I like the series' pokes at various flawed theories. That side of the show does pretty well, as do Skinner's desperate attempts to be politically correct. It's not a great show, but it offers a decent bounce back after a few meh episodes."

Kareem Gantt of Screen Rant thought that although the writers intended to make a commentary about education for women, the episode was "idiotic and pointless, but it was also unusually cruel."

=== Awards and nominations ===
Writer Matt Selman was nominated for a Writers Guild of America Award for Outstanding Writing in Animation at the 59th Writers Guild of America Awards for his script to this episode.

== See also ==
- Sex segregation
- Teen Talk Barbie
- Social Justice Warrior
