= Kiss Kiss, Bang Bangalore =

- The Simpsons episode
- Episode no.: Season 17; Episode 17
- Directed by: Mark Kirkland
- Written by: Dan Castellaneta; Deb Lacusta
- Production code: HABF10
- Original air date: April 9, 2006

Guest appearances
- Richard Dean Anderson as himself; Meher Tatna as an Indian passenger

Episode features
- Couch gag: Homer deals a wild royal flush, consisting of the jack of diamonds (Bart), the queen of diamonds (Marge), the king of diamonds (Homer), the ace of diamonds (Lisa), and the joker (Maggie), then shouts "Woo-hoo!".
- Commentary: Matt Groening; Al Jean; Dan Castellaneta; Deb Lacusta; Ian Maxtone-Graham; Matt Selman; John Frink; Marc Wilmore; Tom Gammill; Richard Dean Anderson; Mark Kirkland; David Silverman

Episode chronology
← Previous "Million Dollar Abie"	Next → "The Wettest Stories Ever Told"
- The Simpsons season 17

"Kiss Kiss, Bang Bangalore" is the seventeenth episode of the seventeenth season of the American animated television series The Simpsons. It originally aired on the Fox network in the United States on April 9, 2006. The episode was written by Dan Castellaneta and Deb Lacusta and directed by Mark Kirkland.

In this episode, Homer is put in charge of outsourcing the Springfield Nuclear Power Plant and managing the Indian employees, and Patty and Selma abduct Richard Dean Anderson, unintentionally reigniting Anderson's enthusiasm for his character MacGyver. Richard Dean Anderson appeared as himself. The episode received mixed reviews.

== Plot ==
After showing a movie about outsourcing at the nuclear power plant, Mr. Burns announces the plant is being shut down and moved to India. Homer is the only employee to be transferred. Arriving in India, he seeks help with outsourcing from Apu's cousin Kavi. Homer spurs the natives into a working frenzy; the natives, not understanding his confusing speech, assume that if they cheer, they will be allowed to return to work. Homer, Smithers, and Burns get a positive impression from this, and Burns takes time off to have fun floating down the Ganges. Homer, left in total charge of an overgrown power plant on an isolated river, appraises the Hindu deities and decides he might be a god himself. A week later, Lenny and Carl come to the India plant, invited by a card claiming that Homer is to become a god.

The rest of the Simpson family, worried about Homer, travel to India and, with Burns, journey upriver on a PBR boat and find Homer ruling the plant like a god. Horrified, Marge and the kids tell the plant workers that Homer is not a god. They explain that they already know, and that they worship him because of the American workplace routines he has instituted, like coffee breaks, early retirement, and personal days. Lisa admits that she is proud of Homer. However, Mr. Burns decides to close down the plant and move it to an area where workers are "more desperate and ignorant" — Springfield. He fires all the workers, who are delighted due to the various firing clauses Homer wrote into their contracts.

Back in Springfield, Patty and Selma meet their Hollywood heart-throb, Richard Dean Anderson, who played MacGyver. He stops by to ask for directions to a convention about his newest show Stargate SG-1, and tells them he is totally uninterested in MacGyver and only did it for the pay. Patty and Selma kidnap Anderson and tie him to a chair. He escapes by using one of his contact lenses to focus the sunlight and burn the ropes. Exhilarated at having performed a MacGyver-style escape in real life, he requests Patty and Selma put him through increasingly complex kidnapping trials. Patty and Selma eventually tire of Anderson's antics, and drive him away by showing him slides of their vacation to the horse-drawn carriage museum in Alberta, Canada, overwhelming him with boredom.

== Production ==
Actor Richard Dean Anderson appeared as himself. Anderson and writers for the television series Stargate SG-1 were fans of the series and would often include references to The Simpsons on their show as well as make Anderson's character Jack O'Neill a fan of the series. This led co-writer Dan Castellaneta to include Anderson attending a Stargate SG-1 convention in this episode.

Meher Tatna guest starred as the voices of various Indian women. She later became a journalist and president of the Hollywood Foreign Press Association.

== Cultural references ==
The way Homer dresses is a reference to what Mola Ram wears in the 1984 film Indiana Jones and the Temple of Doom. As well, the people chant to Homer in a similar way as they do for Mola Ram in the film, and the India portion of the episode is similar to Temple of Doom overall. The scene in which the Simpsons along with Smithers and Burns travel up the river is a direct reference to the PT boat in the 1979 film Apocalypse Now and the Indians' apparent worship of Homer is also a reference to this film as well as the song "The End" by The Doors.

Homer pulls out a cutout of Mac Tonight, a marketing character used by the fast food restaurant McDonald’s in the 1980s.

The song sung at the end of the episode is Kishore Kumar's "Pal bhar ke liye" from the 1970 Indian film Johny Mera Naam, starring Dev Anand and Hema Malini.

Although it is never mentioned by name, the horse-drawn carriage museum in Alberta is the Remington Carriage Museum in Cardston, Alberta. The slides that Patty and Selma show depict the museum's main building, a statue of the museum's founder, Don Remington, and several carriages in their collection. When the episode first aired, museum officials said they were honored by the reference, even if it was in the context of boring summer vacations.

== Reception ==
=== Viewing figures ===
The episode earned a 2.9 rating and was watched by 8.27 million viewers, which was the 45th most-watched show that week.

=== Critical response ===
Adam Finley of TV Squad thought it was "the best episode of the season so far" and was not able to keep up with all the jokes. He also enjoyed seeing Richard Dean Anderson willing to make fun of himself.

Colin Jacobson of DVD Movie Guide said the episode felt "lackluster" despite two plots that "should work well".

On Four Finger Discount, Guy Davis and Brendan Dando liked the subplot with Richard Dean Anderson more than the main plot and thought that people would not understand the Temple of Doom reference.

In 2009, The A.V. Club named the episode as one of the top 10 episodes from seasons 15 through 20.

The episode was criticized for its portrayal of India and the city of Bangalore. The real city has no nuclear power plants, has union workers, and has no elephants in the streets. Also, Indians generally get more vacation days than Americans. Professor Rini B. Mehta of the University of Illinois Urbana-Champaign said that the scene of Homer teaching Indians to form a union was portrayed as if colonizers were conveying their culture to natives.

=== Awards and nominations ===
Dan Castellaneta and Deb Lacusta were nominated for a Writers Guild of America Award for Outstanding Writing in Animation at the 59th Writers Guild of America Awards for their script to this episode.
