= We're on the Road to D'ohwhere =

- The Simpsons episode
- Episode no.: Season 17; Episode 11
- Directed by: Nancy Kruse
- Written by: Kevin Curran
- Production code: HABF04
- Original air date: January 29, 2006

Guest appearance
- Marcia Wallace as Edna Krabappel

Episode features
- Chalkboard gag: "Teacher was not dumped -- It was mutual"
- Couch gag: In a parody of the Bonanza opening, a frontier-style map of Springfield is burned out in the center, revealing The Simpsons on horseback. The Bonanza theme plays throughout.
- Commentary: Al Jean; Kevin Curran; Matt Selman; Marc Wilmore; Dan Castellaneta; David Silverman

Episode chronology
← Previous "Homer's Paternity Coot"	Next → "My Fair Laddy"
- The Simpsons season 17

"We're on the Road to D'ohwhere" is the eleventh episode of the seventeenth season of the American animated television series The Simpsons. It first aired on the Fox network in the United States on January 29, 2006. The episode was written by Kevin Curran and directed by Nancy Kruse.

In this episode, Homer drives Bart to a behavioral modification camp after he ruins the school while Marge and Lisa have a yard sale. The episode received mixed reviews.

== Plot ==
While exploring the school's underground steam tunnels, Bart and Milhouse trigger a massive escape of steam that ruins the school. Although Milhouse is free to go, Principal Skinner proposes that Bart be sent off to "Upward Bound", a behavioral modification camp for troublemaking children based in Portland. Meanwhile, Moe says he is treating Homer, Lenny, Carl and Barney with a trip to Las Vegas, after a suicide attempt led to him suing the rope company that made a faulty noose and earning a settlement. While the others pack their luggage into a minivan at Moe's, Homer drives Bart to the airport to send him to the camp before going to Vegas. However, Bart is on the No Fly List after a previous incident. As Bart cannot board a plane, Homer is forced to miss the trip with his friends to drive Bart to the camp.

While Bart and Homer are away, Marge and Lisa have a yard sale, selling all of Homer and Bart's junk to buy knick-knacks. It is a failure until Otto discovers that Marge is selling the family's expired prescription drugs. Although reluctant, Marge makes money selling the drugs. Meanwhile, Bart tries to reason with Homer, but he resists. While they stop at a roadside diner, Bart pretends to respect Homer and escapes when he is not paying attention. While driving, Homer discovers Bart trying to hitchhike home but crashes through a guard rail onto a cliff edge.

Bart reluctantly rescues Homer by pushing the rear end of the car back onto the ground. They are soon back on the road, now with Bart chained and duct-taped in his seat, because Homer is unable to trust his son. Homer gets Bart to the camp, and leaves him there as Bart sadly watches Homer reluctantly drive away. As he drives to Vegas, Homer begins to feel guilty and decides to retrieve Bart. Although Bart is having a behavioral breakthrough at the camp, he quickly agrees to go with Homer to Vegas. Meanwhile, Chief Wiggum discovers Marge's scheme and arrests her. Lisa returns home from school and gets two phone messages: one from Marge begging Homer for bail money and another from Homer who is in prison for fighting with a pit boss and has lost track of Bart. Lisa tells Maggie that she anticipated this day would happen and states she will look for work in the morning.

== Cultural references ==
The episode's title is a reference to the song "Road to Nowhere" by the American rock band Talking Heads.

== Reception ==
=== Viewing figures ===
The original airing of the episode earned a 3.2 rating and was watched by 8.97 million viewers, which was the 44th most-watched show that week.

=== Critical response ===
Ryan J. Budke of TV Squad enjoyed seeing Homer and Bart bonding and thought the final scene of Lisa listening to the messages from Marge and Homer was "one of the funniest pay-offs this year."

Colin Jacobson of DVD Movie Guide thought the episode was "solid" and liked both the Homer and Bart plot and the Marge subplot.

On Four Finger Discount, Brendan Dando and Guy Davis thought the episode was "bizarre" with "scenes that just seemed to go on forever" and said that the episode did not have an ending.

=== Themes and analysis ===
Unlike most episodes of the series which reset the plot at the end of the episode, this episode is cited as an example of where the episode does not reset the series because Homer and Bart disappear, Marge is in prison, and Lisa must look for a job to support Maggie. However, the viewer is expected to know that the next episode will automatically reset the series. Kunz and Wilde write, "This technique is referred to as the narrative trope 'Snap Back' by TV Tropes, as audiences are expected (and accustomed) to ignore the fact that all occurrences introducing lasting changes to the status quo can and must simply be ignored."
