= The Girl Who Slept Too Little =

- The Simpsons episode
- Episode no.: Season 17; Episode 2
- Directed by: Raymond S. Persi
- Written by: John Frink
- Production code: GABF16
- Original air date: September 18, 2005

Episode features
- Couch gag: Filmed in clay animation, six balls roll in and bump into each other in the living room before turning into Homer, Marge, Bart, Lisa, Maggie, and Gumby.
- Commentary: Al Jean; John Frink; Michael Price; David Silverman; Raymond S. Persi; Matt Selman; Max Pross

Episode chronology
| ← Previous "The Bonfire of the Manatees" | Next → "Milhouse of Sand and Fog" |
- The Simpsons season 17

"The Girl Who Slept Too Little" is the second episode of the seventeenth season of the American animated television series The Simpsons. It originally aired on the Fox network in the United States on September 18, 2005. The episode was written by John Frink and directed by Raymond S. Persi.

In this episode, Lisa develops a fear of the cemetery after one is moved next to the Simpson house. The episode received positive reviews.

== Plot ==
When construction on a postage stamp museum wakes up the Simpson family, everyone in Springfield protests its construction. It is successful, and the museum is moved to the location of the Springfield Cemetery, which is moved next to the Simpson house. Lisa is the only member of the family whose room overlooks it. After Bart scares her about zombies, she develops a fear of the cemetery and runs to sleep in bed with Homer and Marge.

The next day, Marge and Homer ask Lisa to sleep in her own bed. As an early reward, they take her to the stamp museum. There, they visit an exhibit based on artwork for the book The Land of the Wild Beasts. That night, Lisa reads the book and talks to Gravedigger Billy, Groundskeeper Willie's cousin, who works in the cemetery. When a hand comes out of the ground, Lisa hides in Marge and Homer's bedroom. When Homer and Marge return home from their dinner party and encounter Lisa, they sleep in Lisa's room to prove there is nothing to fear. However, when they see Billy try to knock Willie into an empty grave, they also return to their bedroom. Homer and Lisa stay awake watching television, preventing Marge from sleeping, so the parents see a therapist. They admit that Lisa needed to care for herself as a baby while they handled Bart. The therapist says Lisa is suppressing her fears and recommends her book to change Lisa's mindset to that of a child. They steal the book from her. Meanwhile, Lisa decides to overcome her fear by entering the cemetery at night but is locked inside.

Lisa witnesses Dr. Nick stealing body parts while the police hunt a grave robber. When she hears the police stepping on a twig, she runs in fear and faints after hitting her head on a tombstone. When Homer and Marge return home, Bart tells them where Lisa went, so they go looking for her. Meanwhile, Lisa experiences a nightmare where she is eaten by a skeleton, encounters a spider resembling Bart, and is married to a slug resembling Milhouse. Lisa then has a vision of the monsters from The Land of the Wild Beasts and learns that it is reasonable to be scared. They advise her to close the curtains so she cannot see the cemetery. At dawn, Marge and Homer find Lisa and take her home.

== Cultural references ==
The book The Land of the Wild Beasts is a parody of the book Where the Wild Things Are.

== Reception ==
=== Viewing figures ===
The episode earned a 3.6 rating and was watched by 10 million viewers, which was the 13th most-watched show that week.

=== Critical response ===
Ryan Budke of TV Squad enjoyed the episode and said, "I thought this was an absolutely fantastic episode, and I love how they dealt with a semi-serious problem: the conflict that Lisa (and everyone else) has always more-or-less thought of herself as an adult, but she is still very much a little girl."

On Four Finger Discount, Brendan Dando and Guy Davis liked the episode, highlighting the animation and music during Lisa's nightmare.

In 2024, Rich Knight of CinemaBlend named this episode as one of the 15 best episodes focusing on Lisa.

=== Themes and analysis ===
Seth Madej describes Lisa's reaction to her fear by sleeping in her parents' bed to be the wrong reaction because it makes the anxiety worse by saying, "Thanks to the superpower of irrationality, anxiety strengthens the more you evade its source. Lisa experiences that consequence when her phobia of the graveyard intensifies and expands the more she seeks refuge in her parents’ bedroom."

=== Awards and nominations ===
John Frink was nominated for a Writers Guild of America Award for Outstanding Writing in Animation at the 58th Writers Guild of America Awards for his script to this episode.
