= Nancy Kruse =

American animation director

Nancy Kruse is a former animation director on The Simpsons. She started working on the show during the first season as a background clean-up artist. After that she did background layout and character layout for several years on the show before becoming an assistant director. She began directing during season 10 and left the show at the end of season 21 with the season 22 holdover MoneyBART. She was also a story artist on the movie Zootopia and one of the head of story for 2021 Oscar winning movie Encanto.

== The Simpsons episodes ==
She has directed the following episodes:

Season 10

- "Simpsons Bible Stories"

Season 11

- "Guess Who's Coming to Criticize Dinner?"
- "Faith Off"
- "Last Tap Dance in Springfield"

Season 12

- "Hungry, Hungry Homer"

Season 13

- "Jaws Wired Shut"

Season 14

- "I'm Spelling as Fast as I Can"

Season 15

- "My Mother the Carjacker"
- "Today I am A Clown"
- "The Ziff Who Came to Dinner"

Season 16

- "Midnight Rx"
- "There's Something About Marrying"
- "A Star is Torn"

Season 17

- "See Homer Run"
- "We're on the Road to D'ohwhere"
- "Girls Just Want to Have Sums"

Season 18

- "G.I. (Annoyed Grunt)
- "Rome-old and Juli-eh"

Season 19

- "Husbands and Knives"
- "Apocalypse Cow"

Season 20

- "Double, Double, Boy in Trouble"
- "Homer and Lisa Exchange Cross Words"
- "Eeny Teeny Maya Moe"

Season 21

- "The Devil Wears Nada"
- "The Bob Next Door"

Season 22

- "MoneyBART"
