= Don't Fear the Roofer =

- The Simpsons episode
- Homer and Ray Magini
- Episode no.: Season 16; Episode 16
- Directed by: Mark Kirkland
- Written by: Kevin Curran
- Production code: GABF10
- Original air date: May 1, 2005

Guest appearances
- Stephen Hawking as himself; Ray Romano as Ray Magini

Episode features
- Couch gag: The couch scene is a jigsaw puzzle, with Homer's and Maggie's heads missing. Two hands (with five fingers instead of four and a peach skin tone instead of the Simpsons' yellow) put the heads in place, then, noticing Homer and Maggie are switched, fixes them and says, "Woo-hoo!"
- Commentary: Al Jean; Dana Gould; Kevin Curran; Ian Maxtone-Graham; Matt Selman; Nancy Cartwright; Tom Gammill; Max Pross; David Silverman; Mike B. Anderson; Mark Kirkland

Episode chronology
← Previous "Future-Drama"	Next → "The Heartbroke Kid"
- The Simpsons season 16

"Don't Fear the Roofer" is the sixteenth episode of the sixteenth season of the American animated television series The Simpsons. It first aired on the Fox network in the United States on May 1, 2005. The episode was written by Kevin Curran and directed by Mark Kirkland.

In this episode, Homer becomes friends with a roofer when his roof needs to be fixed but no one else seems to encounter him. Comedian Ray Romano and physicist Stephen Hawking guest starred. The episode received positive reviews.

== Plot ==
A major thunderstorm hits Springfield, and Marge demands that Homer fix their leaking roof. Homer attempts to solve the problem by using Hot Wheels ramps to transport all the draining water from the roof to the front yard through the hallway, the stairway and the mail slot on the front door. Though this plan seems to work well, Lisa's hamster slides down the ramps to the front yard by accident. Shocked, Lisa opens the front door to save her hamster, breaking all the ramps, and leaving the house all wet, ruining Bart's preparations for the homework party and leaving Maggie's teddy bear wringing wet. Marge berates Homer for not providing a more sensible solution to fix the roof. Angered, Homer decides to go to Moe's Tavern, but is kicked out when he ruins Lenny's surprise birthday party and sits on his birthday cake by accident, shaped in the form of Lenny's favourite bar stool. Feeling depressed, Homer finds another bar, "Knockers" (a parody of the restaurant Hooters), where he meets a friendly man named Ray Magini. The two talk, and Homer finds out that Ray is a roofer, so Homer asks him to fix his leak. Ray agrees.

The next day, Homer assures Marge that his new friend will be taking care of the roof. Ray, however, does not arrive until everyone else has left. The two of them get up on the roof and use nail guns to nail the boards onto the roof, but they start shooting nails at each other, some hitting Ned Flanders' ride-on lawn mower next door. Ray leaves later and, as Homer runs on the roof to see him off, he crashes through the small part of the roof that they fixed, making the hole bigger. Meanwhile, Marge and the kids leave Santa's Little Helper with Grampa and the Springfield Retirement Home residents, because they seem to like him. When Marge sees the hole, she tells Homer to fix it himself, because she sees no reason to believe that his friend will.

The next day, Bart and Homer go to the Builder's Barn, and Homer meets Ray there. Ray apologizes to Homer for having not finished the job and promises he will stop by soon to work on the roof. Lisa, Marge, and Maggie arrive back at the retirement home, only to discover that Santa's Little Helper has become one of the old people. After Lisa succumbs to the same effect, they permanently take him back home. After waiting a long while for Ray to show on the roof, Marge becomes worried about Homer, and tells him that Ray is just a figment of his imagination. When Homer refuses to believe it, he falls off the roof and is knocked unconscious.

The next day, Homer awakens inside Calmwood Mental Hospital, having been admitted there by Marge. Dr. Hibbert tells him that Ray does not exist; he was created by Homer's mind as Homer was feeling lonely and unappreciated because of the previous events he had endured. All the people that Homer thinks saw Ray - Bart, Ned, and the "Knockers" bartender - claim they did not, and Lisa reveals that "Ray Magini" is an anagram for "imaginary". When Homer spots Ray outside from the window of his hospital room, Hibbert assigns him to "electro-shock" (or electroconvulsive therapy). Six weeks later, Homer is now sure that Ray does not exist. As he is being discharged, he sees Ray again in the room. Angered by the pain the "figment of his imagination" has caused him, he assaults him. In retaliation, Ray knocks Homer out and everyone is surprised they can see him too.

He did really exist the whole time: the bartender did not see Ray as he had an eye patch on (while looking in the direction of Homer and Ray that night, Ray was before his covered eye), and Ray could not be seen by Ned because he was behind the chimney. Bart still viewed Homer with skepticism for talking to thin air, but Stephen Hawking arrives and says that Bart could not see Ray at the hardware store because of a miniature black hole caused directly behind Ray which absorbed the light from Ray. Marge asks Ray why he started fixing the roof and then just disappeared, to which Ray says he is a contractor. Everyone laughs, and Marge says "That's right, you're all crooks!" Hibbert, seeing how angry Homer is as he was made to go through shock treatment for nothing, offers to make it up to him by doing a free eye scraping for him. Homer agrees on it, but also forces Hibbert to fix the roof without any breaks while Ray and Homer discuss Everybody Loves Raymond on the roof during the credits.

== Production ==
Although it was advertised as the 350th episode, it was actually the 351st episode to air ("Future-Drama" is the 350th and "The Heartbroke Kid" is the 352nd). The real 350th episode (in production code order) is "The Father, the Son, and the Holy Guest Star", which was temporarily shelved following the death of Pope John Paul II.

Ray Romano guest starred as Ray Magini. The character also appeared on the 20th anniversary poster of the series in 2009. Physicist Stephen Hawking reprised his role as himself. Hawking first appeared on the show in the tenth season episode "They Saved Lisa's Brain".

=== Edits ===
On the United Kingdom's Channel 4, and in American syndication on Fox affiliates, as well as on the season 16 DVD boxset release, the entire post-credit conversation between Homer and Ray about CBS's Everybody Loves Raymond was re-dubbed with the traditional end music for the show. However, when the episode aired on Sky1, the original end credits were used.

== Cultural references ==
The title of the episode is a reference to the song "(Don't Fear) The Reaper" by Blue Öyster Cult. The song played over the end credits of "The Parent Rap".

Homer and Ray discuss guest star Ray Romano's sitcom Everybody Loves Raymond, which aired its final episode two weeks later. In the original airing of the episode, Ray begins telling Homer to watch the show "while you still can" as the episode ends, and keeps repeating to Homer when Everybody Loves Raymond airs (aired) on CBS, while Homer keeps messing up the day and time, during the closing credits. While some repeats have included this material, other viewings have edited out both parts because of Everybody Loves Raymond's having finished its network run long ago.

The episode is a parody of the 2001 film A Beautiful Mind.

== Reception ==
=== Viewing figures ===
The episode earned a 3.9 rating and was watched by 10.79 million viewers, which was the 33rd most-watched show that week.

=== Critical response ===
Robert Canning of IGN gave the episode a 7.7. He liked the scene with Stephen Hawking and Homer's solution of using a race track to divert the water from the roof, but he thought the episode became less funny as the plot became more convoluted.

Colin Jacobson of DVD Movie Guide thought the main plot was original but "fails to take flight" while he felt the subplot at the retirement home was funnier.

On Four Finger Discount, Guy Davis and Brendan Dando liked Ray Romano's performance and liked seeing Homer have a friend. However, they were not satisfied with Stephen Hawking's explanation to resolve the plot.

Sim Bernardo of Screen Rant called it the best episode of the 16th season.
