= Fat Man and Little Boy =

Fat Man and Little Boy may refer to:

- Fat Man and Little Boy, collectively, atomic bombs used in World War II
- Fat Man and Little Boy (film), 1989 film
- "Fat Man and Little Boy" (The Simpsons), 2004 episode of the TV series

== See also ==
- Atomic bombings of Hiroshima and Nagasaki
