= Future-Drama =

- The Simpsons episode
- Episode no.: Season 16; Episode 15
- Directed by: Mike B. Anderson
- Written by: Matt Selman
- Production code: GABF12
- Original air date: April 17, 2005

Guest appearances
- John DiMaggio as Bender; Amy Poehler as Jenda; Marcia Wallace as Edna Krabappel

Episode features
- Couch gag: Several toy-like forms of transportation come into the living room, only to change Transformers-like into the family.
- Commentary: Al Jean; Matt Selman; Tom Gammill; Max Pross; Mike Reiss; John DiMaggio; Mike B. Anderson; Lauren MacMullan; Jon Vitti

Episode chronology
← Previous "The Seven-Beer Snitch"	Next → "Don't Fear the Roofer"
- The Simpsons season 16

"Future-Drama" is the fifteenth episode of the sixteenth season of the American animated television series The Simpsons. The 350th episode overall, it originally aired on the Fox network in the United States on April 17, 2005. In the episode, Bart and Lisa stumble into Professor Frink's basement, and he gives them a look into their future as teenagers getting ready for their high school graduation.

Matt Selman wrote the episode, and Mike B. Anderson served as director. Amy Poehler and John DiMaggio guest-starred as the characters of Jenda and Bender, respectively. The episode received mixed reviews.

== Plot ==
In the midst of one of their arguments, Bart and Lisa fall into Professor Frink's basement. Frink uses an astrology-based machine to show the kids their future as teenagers.

Eight years in the future (2013), Bart and Lisa are getting ready for their high school graduation and Homer and Marge have separated after Homer blew the family savings on an undersea home. Lisa is graduating two years early and has a scholarship to Yale University, while dating a muscular Milhouse and Bart dates a skateboarder named Jenda. He also shows them a picture of Lisa at age 12 (2009) after she was saved by Milhouse from a fire, which she later learns that he started. After the prom, Jenda wants to have sex with Bart, but Bart has no plans for the future and wants Jenda to marry him and live an aimless life, so she breaks up with him.

Bart unsuccessfully seeks advice from Homer on dating. He then shows Lisa a hologram of the prom, and tells her love can be painful; she agrees, noting she broke up with Milhouse and he had an Incredible Hulk-style meltdown. Lisa suggests that to get Jenda back, he must show her he can provide for her. Bart decides to take Lisa's advice and gets a job at the Kwik-E-Mart. While delivering groceries to Mr. Burns, he rescues him from a robbery by Snake Jailbird. As a reward, Burns gives Lisa's scholarship to Bart. He accepts it, seeing it as a way to get Jenda back. He then tells Lisa about the scholarship causing present and future Lisa to both get angry at Bart. Bart reconciles with Jenda, and now has a good future. That night, Jenda again wants to have sex with Bart, but then he goes into Professor Frink's basement and sees Lisa's bleak future with Milhouse on Frink's machine. Jenda is furious at Bart (she notes she never had any problems sparking romance with Todd Flanders), and gives him an ultimatum: leave and they are finished. Bart does head out and saves Lisa from accepting Milhouse's dismal proposal, then tells his sister he is giving her scholarship back and will find a woman who loves him for himself. Professor Frink then tells present Bart he will get one at age 83, then die one minute later, and his brain would be buried in a pauper's grave.

Meanwhile, Marge has dumped Krusty and reunites with Homer in the underwater home. During the credits, Bart is shown to find the sequence boring, and instead watches Cletus Spuckler's future as the Vice President of the United States on his way to a funeral for the Sultan of Brunei.

== Production ==
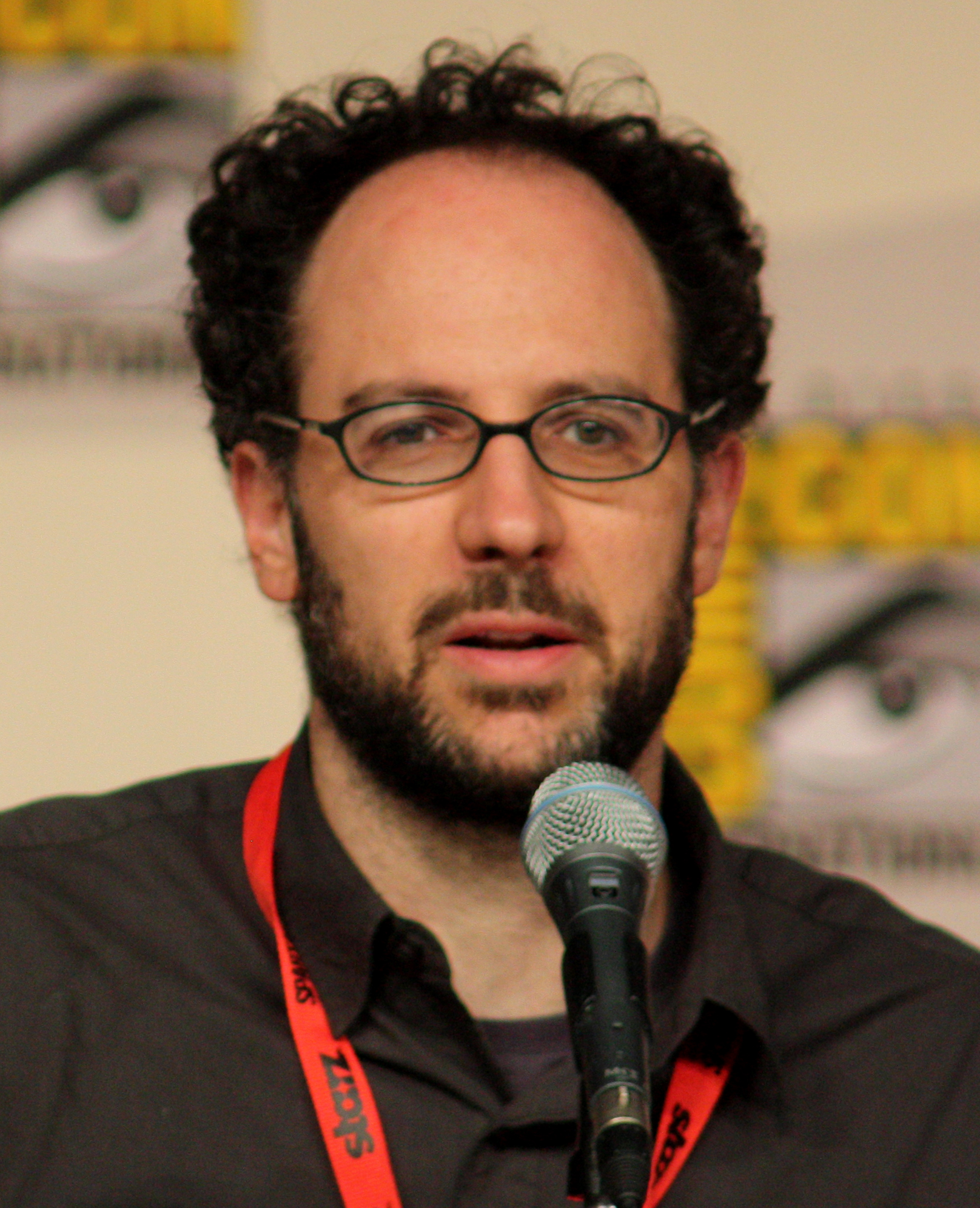
Matt Selman was inspired to write the episode after asking himself what if people saw Lisa and Bart as teenagers.

The episode was written by Matt Selman, his thirteenth writing credit for The Simpsons. The episode was the third season sixteen episode that Mike B. Anderson directed, following "Fat Man and Little Boy" and "Pranksta Rap". It was the third future-themed episode of The Simpsons, following the season six episode "Lisa's Wedding" and the season eleven episode "Bart to the Future".

Even though this is the 350th episode broadcast on FOX, the 350th in production order is "The Father, the Son, and the Holy Guest Star" (which was temporarily shelved following Pope John Paul II's death, and was originally supposed to air after "Don't Fear the Roofer").

In an interview, Selman stated that the story of the episode originated when he asked himself what if people saw Bart and Lisa grow up as "ugly teenagers".

Amy Poehler guest starred as Jenda. John DiMaggio reprised his role as Bender from the television series Futurama, created by Simpsons creator Matt Groening.

== Cultural references ==
The episode's title is a parody of the TV series Futurama, which was also created by Simpsons creator Matt Groening. The character Bender makes a cameo appearance when Homer and Bart pass through a quantum tunnel; voice actor John DiMaggio reprised his role voicing Bender. The song playing while Homer and Bart cruise through the former's hovercar is "I.G.Y." by Donald Fagen. The songs "Take On Me" by a-ha, "Bizarre Love Triangle" by New Order, "Incense and Peppermints" by Strawberry Alarm Clock, and "True" by Spandau Ballet are played during Bart and Lisa's prom. "Sea of Love" by Phil Phillips plays while Homer and Marge kiss in the former's aquatic home. "Lenny's Super Pet" bears a strong resemblance to Superman's pet dog, Krypto.

== Reception ==
=== Viewing figures ===
In its original American broadcast, "Future-Drama" garnered roughly 8.3 million viewers. The show finished third in its original timeslot.

=== Critical response ===
Hayden Childs of The A.V. Club wrote in 2011 that the episode was "full of sweetness and funny", but he thought "Holidays of Future Passed" was better.

Colin Jacobson of DVD Movie Guide felt time travel episodes were "spotty" and thought the episode was "the weakest show in a while."

On Four Finger Discount, Guy Davis and Brendan Dando thought it was a "by the numbers" episode where nothing stood out. They liked the ending when Bart makes the sacrifice for Lisa.

=== Awards and nominations ===
The episode was also nominated for a Primetime Emmy Award for Outstanding Animated Program (for Programming Less Than One Hour) in 2005.
