= Homer and Ned's Hail Mary Pass =

- The Simpsons episode
- Episode no.: Season 16; Episode 8
- Directed by: Steven Dean Moore
- Written by: Tim Long
- Production code: GABF02
- Original air date: February 6, 2005

Guest appearances
- Tom Brady as himself; LeBron James as himself; Michelle Kwan as herself; Yao Ming as himself; Warren Sapp as himself

Episode features
- Couch gag: The family builds a totem pole by standing on each other's shoulders (with Maggie on top).
- Commentary: Matt Groening; Al Jean; Tim Long; Ian Maxtone-Graham; Matt Selman; Michael Price; Bill Odenkirk; Tom Gammill; Max Pross; Dan Castellaneta; Steven Dean Moore; David Silverman

Episode chronology
← Previous "Mommie Beerest"	Next → "Pranksta Rap"
- The Simpsons season 16

"Homer and Ned's Hail Mary Pass" is the eighth episode of the sixteenth season of the American animated television series The Simpsons. It originally aired on the Fox network in the United States on February 6, 2005. The episode was written by Tim Long and directed by Steven Dean Moore.

In this episode, Homer teaches victory dances to athletes after his dance is seen around the world while Ned films movies about the Bible, which are unpopular with the townsfolk. When Homer is recruited to produce the Super Bowl halftime show, he enlists Ned to help him stage a Bible story.

The episode is a Super Bowl-themed episode that was broadcast after Super Bowl XXXIX, followed by the premiere of American Dad!. This is the first episode in which Comic Book Guy's real name, Jeff Albertson, is revealed to the audience. Athletes Tom Brady, LeBron James, Michelle Kwan, Yao Ming, and Warren Sapp appear as themselves. The episode received mixed reviews.

== Plot ==
The Simpsons go to Springfield Park and find it has become a trash-strewn dump, but they see a nearby charity carnival which is raising money to help the park. Bart wins the grand prize in a carnival game, and then Homer beats him, going into an extended victory dance. Ned Flanders captures the dance on video and Comic Book Guy places it on his website. Soon, the entire world has seen Homer's embarrassing dance, humiliating him. However, several major sports stars ask Homer to teach them elaborate victory dances.

Meanwhile, Ned uses his camera to make a movie about Cain (Rod) and Abel (Todd). Everyone loves the film, except Marge, who finds it bloody and disgusting. Mr. Burns decides to finance Ned's next film, Tales of the Old Testament, which has a running time of 800 minutes – more than 13 hours. The bloodiness of the film angers Marge, and she announces at the screening that she will protest anything that Burns owns. Burns retorts, noting that he owns the town's nuclear power plant, and there is no other power source. When the crowd blurt out alternative forms of power they can use, Burns admits defeat and says the film will never be seen again, much to Ned's dismay.

Homer's victory dances annoy some purist fans but become so popular that he is recruited by professional football to choreograph the Super Bowl halftime show. When he is unable to think of any ideas with the game looming the following night, Homer finds Ned at church. Together, they decide to stage one of Ned's Bible stories at the show. At the Super Bowl, Ned and Homer stage the story of Noah's Ark, at the end of which Ned appears and reads a passage from the Bible. The audience jeers and boos while both Homer and Ned are disappointed. The media and the general public later accuse the Super Bowl of forcing Christianity onto the country via their "blatant display of religion and decency".

== Production ==
In July 2004, Fox announced that this episode of The Simpsons would serve as the lead-out program for Super Bowl XXXIX and feature a football-themed plot. Football players Tom Brady and Warren Sapp, basketball players LeBron James and Yao Ming, and figure skater Michelle Kwan appeared as themselves. The series premiere of the television series American Dad! would air after this episode.

The episode is notable for revealing the real name of the character Comic Book Guy to be Jeff Albertson. It was a long-running gag on the show that the character's name never be revealed, with other characters referring to him as "Comic Book Guy". The writers had intended to name the character as early as his first episode, but they could not think of a name for him, and they called him "Comic Book Guy", with the intention of naming the character the next time they used him. However, they kept putting it off. Showrunner Al Jean remarked: "That was specifically done to make people really mad. We just tried to pick a generic name. It was also the Super Bowl show. We did it so the most people possible would see it." Matt Groening stated that he had originally intended him to be called Louis Lane and be "obsessed and tormented by" Lois Lane, but was out of the room when the writers named him.

== Cultural references ==
During the episode, Homer lifts his shirt to reveal a Bengals tattoo, implying he is a fan of the Cincinnati Bengals football team.

== Release ==
The episode premiered simultaneously in all United States time zones at 10:45 PM ET/7:45 PM PT following Super Bowl XXXIX.

== Purported foreshadowing ==
In 2022, Tom Brady's apparel line unveiled a hoodie that appeared to be like the one he wears in the episode, including the color and the word "BRADY" printed across the chest. This was reported to be a prediction made by the series.

== Reception ==
=== Viewing figures ===
The original broadcast of the episode was watched by 23.1 million people, making it the most-watched episode since season 14's "I'm Spelling as Fast as I Can". It finished sixth in the weekly ratings for the week of January 31–February 6, 2005.

=== Critical response ===
Colin Jacobson of DVD Movie Guide said it was one of the season's best episodes and enjoyed Homer's story more than Ned's. However, he thought that it was difficult to connect the two storylines.

On Four Finger Discount, Guy Davis and Brendan Dando thought the episode was "lazy". They said the episode was done for marketing purposes and to get as many guest stars as possible since it premiered after the Super Bowl.

In 2020, The Athletic ranked the episode as number 23 out of the top 25 sports-themed Simpsons episodes, highlighting Michelle Kwan's line and Tom Brady riding a segway with a "Everyone Sucks But Me" banner.

In 2022, Collider ranked the episode as the seventh-best Super Bowl lead-out program and said it was better than the previous lead-out episode, the tenth season episode "Sunday, Cruddy Sunday".
