= On a Clear Day I Can't See My Sister =

- The Simpsons episode
- Episode no.: Season 16; Episode 11
- Directed by: Bob Anderson
- Written by: Jeff Westbrook
- Production code: GABF05
- Original air date: March 6, 2005

Guest appearances
- Gary Busey as himself; Jane Kaczmarek as Judge Constance Harm

Episode features
- Chalkboard gag: "Beer in a milk carton is not milk"
- Couch gag: Repeat of the Powers of Ten parody couch gag from "The Ziff Who Came to Dinner", only in this version, Kang and Kodos can be heard laughing and Homer says, "Cool!" instead of "Wow!"
- Commentary: Matt Groening; Al Jean; Ian Maxtone-Graham; Matt Selman; Tim Long; Michael Price; Michael Marcantel; Tom Gammill; Max Pross; Jeff Westbrook; David Silverman

Episode chronology
← Previous "There's Something About Marrying"	Next → "Goo Goo Gai Pan"
- The Simpsons season 16

"On a Clear Day I Can't See My Sister" is the eleventh episode of the sixteenth season of the American animated television series The Simpsons. It originally aired on the Fox network in the United States on March 6, 2005. The episode was directed by Bob Anderson and written by Jeff Westbrook.

In this episode, Lisa files a restraining order against Bart when she loses patience with his pranks on her while Homer works at a hypermarket. Jane Kaczmarek guest starred as Judge Constance Harm while actor Gary Busey appeared as himself. The episode was temporarily banned in some countries following the 2011 Tōhoku earthquake and tsunami.

== Plot ==
The Springfield Elementary School students go on a field trip to the mostly melted Springfield Glacier where Bart repeatedly pranks Lisa. After she loses her patience with him, Lisa enforces a restraining order against Bart that prevents him from coming within twenty feet of her. Meanwhile, Homer replaces Grampa as a greeter for Sprawl-Mart after he has an accident retrieving a shopping cart. Homer likes the job because there is no pressure to advance.

Chief Wiggum shows the Simpsons a video to explain how the restraining order works. Homer constructs a twenty-foot pole for Lisa to ensure that Bart stays the correct distance away from her. Because there is no place at school for Bart to keep the proper distance, Bart is forced to learn in Groundskeeper Willie's shack and must eat lunch outside. Seeing how Bart must move every time Lisa comes near him, Marge decides to get an appeal for lifting the restraining order. However, Bart accidentally insults Judge Constance Harm during the hearing by stating she became a judge instead of having a husband but Harm points out that she is married. Harm expands the order to two hundred feet, forcing Bart to live in the Simpsons' backyard. Meanwhile, Homer's manager creates a fake Mexican identification card for him to force him to work overtime without extra pay under threat of deportation.

Homer and his co-workers are locked in the store late at night to continue working. When Homer complains, he is shocked by the compliance chip the manager implanted in Homer's neck. He removes it, and his co-workers reveal that they also removed their chips and steal items instead of working. Homer joins them by stealing several plasma televisions. Meanwhile, Bart begins to live in nature without needing to go inside the house. Seeing Bart's feral behavior, Marge tries to reason with Lisa. She responds that Bart has not done anything nice for her recently. When Marge points out two examples to the contrary, she promises to waive the order when she thinks of a third example. She later sees Bart building a statue of her and is impressed, so she reconciles with him. However, when she finds out that it was going to be burned in effigy, Bart lies, but Lisa forgives him anyway. She burns the effigy along with the pole and the restraining order releasing Bart from it, and they reunite with the family and play music.

== Production ==
This is the first episode of the series written by Jeff Westbrook. He was previously a writer on the television series Futurama, which was created by Simpsons creator Matt Groening. Jane Kaczmarek reprised her role as Judge Constance Harm. Kaczmarek first voiced this role in the thirteenth season episode "The Parent Rap". Actor Gary Busey appeared as himself. When Busey recorded his part, he asked why the stage direction called for a "crazy insane laugh." He was told that it was because his character was "overjoyed" to be Gary Busey, and Busey was satisfied with the answer.

After the death of Pope John Paul II in April 2005, a repeat of this episode was aired instead of the new episode "The Father, the Son, and the Holy Guest Star" so that Catholics would not be offended.

== Censorship ==
Following the 2011 Tōhoku earthquake and tsunami and the associated nuclear emergency, the episode was temporarily banned from the German television network ProSieben, Swiss network Schweizer Fernsehen and Austrian broadcaster ORF due to jokes about a nuclear meltdown. Canadian channel Omni Television also banned the episode, but The Comedy Network did not ban it. It was also pulled from Network 10 in Australia for a similar reason. 20th Television provided United States television stations a list of potential episodes to remove. Executive producer Al Jean stated that he understood if episodes were temporarily removed when disasters occur. However, he said that there were no plans for Homer to leave his job at the nuclear power plant.

== Reception ==
=== Viewing figures ===
The episode earned a 3.7 ratings and was watched by 10.4 million viewers, which was the 33rd most-watched show that week.

=== Critical response ===
On Four Finger Discount, Guy Davis and Brendan Dando called the episode "horrible." They questioned why the creative staff allowed new writer Jeff Westbrook to write an episode that changed the behavior of the characters to fit the story.

=== Awards and nominations ===
This episode was nominated at the 15th Environmental Media Awards for Television Episodic – Comedy.
