= Mommie Beerest =

- The Simpsons episode
- Episode no.: Season 16; Episode 7
- Directed by: Mark Kirkland
- Written by: Michael Price
- Production code: GABF01
- Original air date: January 30, 2005

Episode features
- Couch gag: The living room is made of sand. The family, looking haggard and dehydrated, crawls in, but end up lying under the desert sun when the living room collapses.
- Commentary: Al Jean; Matt Selman; Tim Long; Michael Price; Tom Gammill; Max Pross; Hank Azaria; Tress MacNeille

Episode chronology
| ← Previous "Midnight Rx" | Next → "Homer and Ned's Hail Mary Pass" |
- The Simpsons season 16

"Mommie Beerest" is the seventh episode of the sixteenth season of the American animated television series The Simpsons. It first aired on the Fox network in the United States on January 30, 2005. The episode was directed by Mark Kirkland and written by Michael Price.

In this episode, Marge becomes invested in the success of Moe's Tavern after Homer gets a new mortgage on his house to pay for repairs at Moe's. The episode received mixed reviews.

== Plot ==
At Moe's, Homer and Moe celebrate Homer finally paying off the mortgage when the health inspector has come for his regular visit. Since the inspector is a friend of Moe's, he gives the bar a clean bill of health, regardless of numerous violations, but he dies upon consuming one of the expired pickled eggs. The new inspector immediately declares Moe's Tavern to be closed down until the violations are cleared up and the weekly garbage pickup disposes of his predecessor's corpse.

Later, while the regulars hold an Irish wake on the sidewalk, Homer is guilty about Moe's Tavern being closed down because of him visiting the tavern all the time, but decides to help Moe reopen the bar by getting a new mortgage for his home, forging with Marge, who becomes the new co-owner. Homer visits a cleaned-up Moe's with Marge running it to protect their investment. Marge suggests that Moe's should become an English pub and to rename it The Nag & Weasel to improve its image. The Nag & Weasel is a success, and Homer is worried that Marge now spends more time at the establishment than Homer has ever done.

Homer and Marge go to a movie together, only to be joined by Moe, and Homer learns from Lenny and Carl that Marge and Moe are having what is called an "emotional affair". Homer is also scared when Marge reminds him for the 11th time they are planning to attend a bartender convention in Aruba. Homer rushes to the airport, escorted by Chief Wiggum, and gets to the plane as it is about to become airborne. Meanwhile, Moe finally confesses his true feelings for his partner that he has hidden in the dark for so long, spurred on by the alarming display he witnesses from the window seat. He tells Marge he loves her, and in a rush, asks her to marry him. Marge is shocked, but before she can answer, a soaking-wet Homer bursts out of the toilet seat in the bathroom and glares at Moe to leave his wife alone. Moe shouts back that Homer does not deserve Marge at all since he knows nothing about her: her favorite dish, for example. Homer does admit that he does not know much about his own wife, but despite his faults, Marge reassures him that he really is her true love, not the bartender.

The three arrive in Aruba, where the miserable Moe attempts to drown himself because of his loss, only to be stopped by Marge and Homer. Marge explains to him that he is sweet enough a man to be loved by someone else, if only he is willing to make a few, minor changes. Moe seems to listen, but nevertheless reverts to his original scheme of sharing a hotel room with Marge (he has changed the booking on the sly). Marge instead forces Moe to share the bed with Homer while she settles down on the couch, only to then realize that no one is watching Bart, Lisa and Maggie, who are shown to have traveled to Paris to enter a hot-air balloon race.

== Production ==
This episode was dedicated to Johnny Carson, who died a week before this episode aired. Carson also guest-starred as himself on the season-four finale "Krusty Gets Kancelled".

== Reception ==
=== Viewing figures ===
The episode earned a 3.6 rating and was watched by 9.97 million viewers, which was the 42nd most-watched show that week.

=== Critical response ===
Colin Jacobson of DVD Movie Guide wrote that he had seen role reversal episodes previously. He said, "[n]othing terrific develops, but there's a decent level of entertainment."

On Four Finger Discount, Guy Davis and Brendan Dando liked the episode but thought viewers needed throw "logic out the window" to not deal with the consequences of the episode.

=== Awards and nominations ===
The episode won writer Michael Price the Writers Guild of America Award for Television: Animation at the 58th Writers Guild of America Awards, marking the third year in a row that an episode of The Simpsons won the award.
