= The Heartbroke Kid =

- The Simpsons episode
- Promotional image
- Episode no.: Season 16; Episode 17
- Directed by: Steven Dean Moore
- Written by: Ian Maxtone-Graham
- Production code: GABF11
- Original air date: May 1, 2005

Guest appearances
- Albert Brooks as Tab Spangler and Jacques; Marcia Wallace as Edna Krabappel

Episode features
- Chalkboard gag: An obese Bart buys a chocolate bar from a vending machine instead of doing a chalkboard gag during this episode.
- Couch gag: (first) The family, along with the couch, are launched by a catapult. / (second) Everyone makes it to the couch normally, except for the now-obese Bart, who walks in a few seconds later and suffers a heart attack.
- Commentary: Al Jean; Ian Maxtone-Graham; Dana Gould; Michael Price; Matt Selman; Lance Kramer; Max Pross; David Silverman; Steven Dean Moore

Episode chronology
← Previous "Don't Fear the Roofer"	Next → "A Star Is Torn"
- The Simpsons season 16

"The Heartbroke Kid" is the seventeenth episode of the sixteenth season of the American animated television series The Simpsons. It was written by Ian Maxtone-Graham and directed by Steven Dean Moore. It first aired on the Fox network in the United States on May 1, 2005.

In this episode, Bart gains weight from eating sugary snacks and is forced to attend a camp to lose weight after suffering a heart attack. Meanwhile, the Simpsons turn their house into a youth hostel to pay for the camp. Albert Brooks guest stars in the episode, playing the character Tab Spangler, as well as briefly reprising Jacques from "Life on the Fast Lane". The episode received mixed reviews.

"The Heartbroke Kid" is the 352nd episode in the program's history and was broadcast straight after the 351st episode, "Don't Fear the Roofer", on the Fox network in the United States.

== Plot ==
Principal Skinner is looking for a company to sign a vending machine contract with Springfield Elementary, with half of the machine's profits going to the school. After rejecting suggestions of a gumbo machine from the Sea Captain that seriously burned the Sea Captain's hand and a request box from Gil, Skinner is won over by Lindsey Naegle's suggestion of unhealthy vending machines sponsored by hip-hop artists. Most of the students use the machines (save for Lisa, who protests their extremely high sugar content and artificial additives), but Bart is seen using it the most frequently. After three weeks of gorging on the snacks, Bart significantly gains weight and becomes obese and, during an in-show parody of the opening credits, he suffers a heart attack after slowly trying to make it home from school.

Dr. Hibbert informs the family that Bart is addicted to junk food, noting that malted milk balls have clogged his arteries, and that a wad of Laffy Taffy is blocking his liver. Marge tries to put Bart on a diet, although the family's attendance at a milkshake festival fails to persuade him. Lisa discovers that Bart has been hiding junk food in the wall of his room, and the family stages an intervention. When Bart tries to run away, due to his widened and obese frame, he gets stuck in a fence and is caught by two representatives of a maximum security fat camp, Serenity Ranch. Bart ends up there with Apu, Rainier Wolfcastle (who was last seen fattening up for a movie), and Kent Brockman, and the camp's leader is none other than short-tempered former U.S. Marine Tab Spangler. However, whilst Bart is there, the family is faced with an expensive bill. To pay for the camp, the family converts their house into a youth hostel, which attracts German backpackers, who humiliate the family by making Homer sing and dance for change and forcing Marge and Lisa to clean intentional messes while pointing out America's problems one by one.

At the fat camp, Bart cheats by sneaking food that is disposed of, so Spangler takes him home to visit the family to show him how his family is working continually to appease the backpackers staying in their home, and suggests that Bart fight his junk food addiction. Bart takes his advice and returns to the school at night, where he destroys the vending machines and steals all the money from them. When Bart returns home with the money, which the family can now use to pay for the bill, Homer gets revenge by chasing out the Germans. Spangler says that Bart still has three weeks left of non-refundable treatment, and Homer is forced by the family (presumably as payback for calling Bart a "freeloading fatso") to go with Spangler, where the episode ends with them driving in Spangler's car arguing over the cheeseburger Homer is eating.

== Production ==
Albert Brooks guest starred in the episode as Bart's fitness instructor at fat camp in his fifth appearance on the show. It was his first appearance for almost a decade, having previously voiced characters in the episodes "The Call of the Simpsons" (1990); "Life on the Fast Lane" (1990); "Bart's Inner Child" (1993) and "You Only Move Twice" (1996). In The Simpsons Movie (2007), Brooks voiced another character, Russ Cargill. Brooks also briefly reprises his role as Jacques during the sequence where an overweight Bart rides his skateboard through the town mimicking the show's opening sequence.

In January 2005, the episode was originally promoted as the 350th episode of the series. News reports also identified the previous episode as the 350th episode.

== Release ==
The episode aired at 8:30 PM ET/PT immediately following the previous episode.

== Reception ==
=== Viewing figures ===
The episode earned a 4.3 rating and was watched by 11.92 million viewers, which was the 23rd most-watched show that week.

=== Critical response ===
Colin Jacobson of DVD Movie Guide did not like the episode for having a moral message but liked the performance by Albert Brooks.

On Four Finger Discount, Guy Davis and Brendan Dando liked the episode. They highlighted the performance by Albert Brooks and thought the story was relatable from both a child's and a parent's perspective.

IGN listed Albert Brooks as the top guest star on The Simpsons for voicing Tab Spangler, along with his previous voice roles.
