= Goo Goo Gai Pan =

- The Simpsons episode
- Episode no.: Season 16; Episode 12
- Directed by: Lance Kramer
- Written by: Dana Gould (under the pseudonym "Lawrence Talbot")
- Production code: GABF06
- Original air date: March 13, 2005

Guest appearances
- Lucy Liu as Madam Wu; Robert Wagner as himself

Episode features
- Couch gag: The ancillary characters surprise the Simpsons as they run to the couch. Homer has a heart attack.
- Commentary: Al Jean; Dana Gould; Ian Maxtone-Graham; Matt Selman; Michael Price; Max Pross; Lance Kramer; Steven Dean Moore; David Silverman

Episode chronology
| ← Previous "On a Clear Day I Can't See My Sister" | Next → "Mobile Homer" |
- The Simpsons season 16

"Goo Goo Gai Pan" is the twelfth episode of the sixteenth season of the American animated television series The Simpsons. It was originally aired on the Fox network in the United States on March 13, 2005. The episode was written by Dana Gould and directed by Lance Kramer.

The episode focuses on Selma Bouvier adopting a Chinese orphan after experiencing menopause. Lucy Liu guest stars as Madam Wu, and actor Robert Wagner appears as himself. The episode received mixed reviews and was banned in China and Hong Kong.

== Plot ==
While giving Mr. Burns a driving test to replace his long-expired license, Selma experiences a hot flash; she finds out she has entered menopause and can no longer have children. Afraid of dying alone, she decides to adopt a baby girl from China. Since the Chinese government only allows married couples to adopt, Selma puts on her application that her spouse is Homer.

Selma sponsors a trip to China for the Simpsons; Homer is reluctant to pretend to be married to her, but agrees to do it for Marge. Arriving in Beijing, the adoption agent, Madam Wu, tells Selma she will have her baby after she has detailed the "marriage relationship" between her and Homer, much to their dismay. Selma informs Madam Wu that Bart and Lisa are her children, while Marge is their nanny, while Homer, on a whim, tells her he is an acrobat. He is then forced into substituting for a performer in a Chinese acrobatics display, which lands him in hospital. While he is recovering, Madam Wu discovers the ruse as she hears Homer and Marge talking about the false marriage.

Selma receives a baby daughter, Ling, but as they are about to leave for Springfield, Madam Wu denies her adoption and takes Ling from her. Lisa devises a plot to retrieve Ling by dressing and spray-painting Homer to look like a golden Buddha statue and leaving him outside Ling's nursery. According to the customs of feng shui, the Buddha statue must be taken indoors, so Chinese guards drag him into the nursery, where Homer sneaks around and finds Ling. As the family pass through Tiananmen Square en route to the airport, Madam Wu confronts them in a Type 59 Tank." Selma appeals to her and, drawing from her own experienced of being raised by a single mother, Wu shows leniency and allows her to adopt Ling. The family departs China by junk, along with the Chinese child spy masquerading as Bart, while three chinese dragons fly above them singing while playing an erhu.

== Reception ==
=== Viewing figures ===
The episode earned a 3.7 rating and was watched by 10.28 million viewers, which was the 45th most-watched show that week.

=== Critical response ===
Robert Canning of IGN wrote: "The plot is simple. Selma is diagnosed with menopause and decides that since she can no longer have her own baby, she'll adopt one. ("The adoption process! That'll end heartbreak.") After a failed attempt, Lisa suggests her aunt try China. When filling out the forms, Selma is told only married couples are allowed to adopt, so she writes down Homer's name for her husband. She tells the official, 'Homer Simpson is my whole world. I love him.' Across town at the nuclear power plant, Homer shudders, stating, 'A chill just went through my very soul.' It's a classic-mismatched set up, straight out of IGN's TV Playbook. Unfortunately, when they arrive in China for observation, the comedy doesn't really come from the unlikelihood of Homer and Selma as husband and wife, but from numerous random jokes about all things Chinese."

Colin Jacobson of DVD Movie Guide thought the episode was "erratic". He said the episode appeared to be an excuse to bring the Simpson family to China.

On Four Finger Discount, Guy Davis and Brendan Dando liked the story of Homer helping Selma adopt a baby but also thought the depiction of China used many stereotypes.

=== Awards and nominations ===
The episode was nominated for the Turner Award at the 15th Environmental Media Awards.

== Unavailability in China and Hong Kong ==
Selma stood in the path of a tank, recreating the iconic Tank Man image.

In 2006, the episode was banned in China when it banned all foreign cartoons from appearing at the most popular viewing times for children.

Disney+, on which The Simpsons is available, was launched in Hong Kong on November 16, 2021. Disney+ subscribers in Hong Kong have noted that the episode "Goo Goo Gai Pan" is not available in that region. It was removed due to references to the 1989 Tiananmen Square massacre in Beijing.
