= Holidays of Future Passed =

- The Simpsons episode
- Bart and Lisa reconcile in their old treehouse. This scene was particularly acclaimed for its emotional weight.
- Episode no.: Season 23; Episode 9
- Directed by: Rob Oliver
- Written by: J. Stewart Burns
- Production code: NABF18
- Original air date: December 11, 2011

Episode features
- Chalkboard gag: "Cafeteria trays are not toboggans"
- Couch gag: The Simpson family, as gingerbread people, jumps on a plate for Santa Claus, and Homer eats his own arm.

Episode chronology
← Previous "The Ten-Per-Cent Solution"	Next → "Politically Inept, with Homer Simpson"
- The Simpsons season 23

"Holidays of Future Passed" is the ninth episode of the twenty-third season of the American animated television series The Simpsons. It originally aired on the Fox network in the United States on December 11, 2011. Most of the episode is set thirty years (2041) into the future, when Bart and Lisa take their children with them to Homer and Marge's house over Christmas, while a pregnant Maggie goes into labor. Bart has divorced his wife, Jenda, and is struggling to become a better father for his two boys, while Lisa has trouble connecting with her rebellious teenage daughter, Zia. The Simpsons creator Matt Groening made a minor uncredited cameo appearance as a sports commentator shouting "goal!" during a soccer game.

Originally written as a potential series finale, the episode has received highly positive reception from television critics who often cited it as the best episode of the season. It has been particularly praised for its humor and for its emotional scenes, such as one where Bart and Lisa sit in their old treehouse and talk about how difficult parenting is.

During the original broadcast, "Holidays of Future Passed" was watched by about 6.43 million people.

== Plot ==
After dinner on Thanksgiving, Marge initiates taking the annual Christmas card family photo and, when Bart and Lisa complain about it, she notes that they will grow to appreciate the photos when they become older and have children of their own. Lisa questions why Marge would assume they will even have children in the first place, while Bart confidently claims that he won't, desiring for the Simpson family's legacy of dysfunction to cease. The episode jumps thirty years into the future (2041) via a compilation of Simpson Christmas cards accompanied by the song "Sleigh Ride" performed by The Ronettes. The photos finally settle on a future where Bart is a deadbeat, divorced father with two sons whom he does not see often; Lisa is a successful businesswoman who is married to Milhouse and has a rebellious teenage daughter named Zia; and Maggie is the lead singer of a famous band and in the late stages of pregnancy. In his apartment at the former Springfield Elementary, Bart is visited by his sons, who inform him that their mother, Jenda, teleported them to his place because she wants him to act like a proper father by having him spend time with them. However, he plans on dropping them off at his parents' house instead, which his boys can hear. Meanwhile, Lisa fears that Zia is spending too much of her time going into the "Ultranet", a digital world that people enter with their consciousness by plugging themselvesinto a laptop through their belly buttons. Milhouse suggests to Lisa that she spend time with Zia in order for them to have a better connection, so Lisa decides to take Zia to her parents' house, too. Meanwhile, Maggie is ordered by her doctor to not speak until she gives birth, as new research has discovered the umbilical cord is actually a vocal cord, and when asked her band members do not disclose who the father is. Unable to teleport due to her pregnancy, Maggie flies home from London to Springfield to also celebrate Christmas with her parents, where it’s shown air travel has significantly degraded.

When Bart and Lisa arrive at their parents' home, they stay there with their children. Unfortunately for Lisa, she only gets unhelpful advice from Marge on how to be a better mother, and Zia continues to go into the Ultranet. Meanwhile, Bart is heartbroken to find out that Jenda has remarried, while he has not found anyone new. Feeling depressed, he tells Homer to take his grandsons out. The boys become angry with their father for not spending time with them, but the two have a great time with their grandfather. Bart and Lisa then encounter each other in their old treehouse, where they become drunk and talk about how difficult parenting is. After exchanging inspirational advice, they realize that they need to try harder to connect with their children. Meanwhile, upon arriving in Springfield, Maggie starts experiencing contractions and Kearney, now a taxi driver, drives her to the hospital. In the waiting room, the receptionist informs Kearney there’s no room at their in patient facility, but after Kearney tells her Maggie just performed a sold out show in Beijing, making the receptionist remark she’s a star in the East, she finds a small room for her in the "Manger Wing".

Homer takes Bart's sons to a cryonics facility where Grampa has been frozen alive to prevent a disease from killing him. Although a cure has now been discovered, he is kept frozen by Homer because it is cheaper than paying for a nursing home and because Grampa has constantly been rude to him. Homer says to the boys that they should give their father another chance, since he knows Bart loves them. At that point, Bart arrives and apologizes to his sons, admitting how much he treasures them. Touched, the two boys forgive him for not having included them in his life much, while an inspired Homer decides to unfreeze Grampa and forgive him, as well. Meanwhile, Lisa goes into the Ultranet by putting a cord into her navel to find Zia and discovers a door leading into Zia's private world. Entering it, Lisa is overjoyed to find that, along with other academic interests, Zia has hung a poster of her next to a series of posters depicting historical women who have made a difference in the world. When Zia arrives, Lisa thanks her for looking up to her and the two reconcile at last, but secretly hides her life as a party poser. With the conflicts resolved, Bart and Lisa gather their children in preparation for a new Christmas family photo. Marge arrives with Maggie, who has given birth to a baby girl. Grampa asks who the father is, but as Maggie is about to answer he cuts her off, sayung if there’s any day unwed mothers need a break it’s Christmas. The Simpsons gather into a group just as the family pets (who have evolved greatly over the past thirty years) take the new photo.

== Production ==
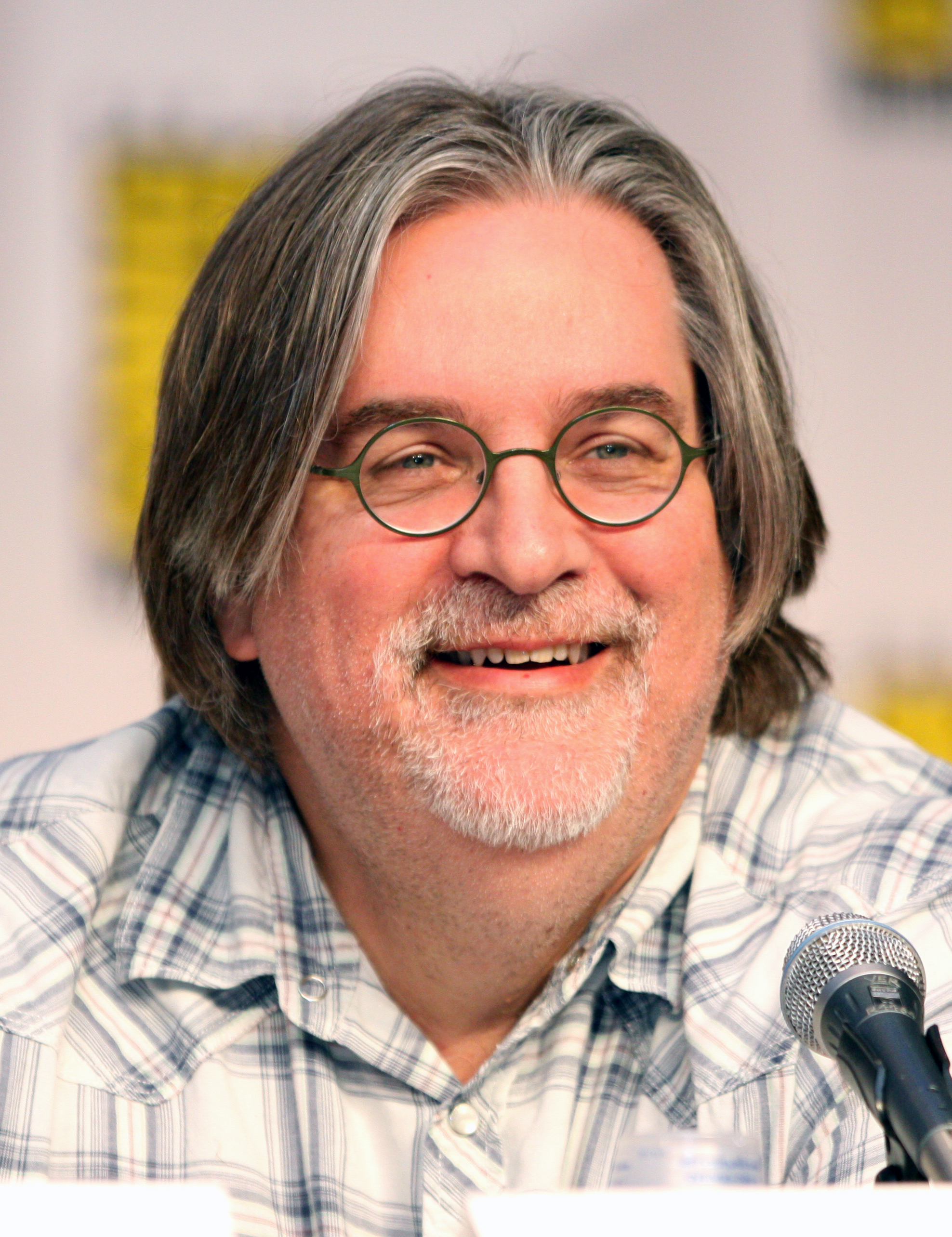
The episode features a minor uncredited cameo appearance from The Simpsons creator Matt Groening.

The episode, titled "Holidays of Future Passed", was written by J. Stewart Burns and directed by Rob Oliver. It was first announced to the press at San Diego Comic-Con on July 23, 2011, during a panel with the producers of The Simpsons. "Holidays of Future Passed" is the eleventh episode of the series with a Christmas theme and the fourth episode set in the future (the others being "Lisa's Wedding" from 1995, "Bart to the Future" from 2000, and "Future-Drama" from 2005). Originally there was a joke in the episode about a meltdown occurring at the Springfield Nuclear Power Plant in the future; however, it was cut following the 2011 Tōhoku earthquake and tsunami that resulted in several nuclear accidents in Japan.

The Simpsons creator Matt Groening made a minor cameo appearance in the episode, though his appearance is not mentioned in the closing credits. In the episode, a robot examines the health of Maggie's fetus. Maggie's band is present and one of the band members presses a button on the robot's "face", which is a screen showing its facial expressions, and a soccer game comes on instead. A sports commentator, voiced by Groening, gives a long "goal!" shout that is heard over the game. According to The Simpsons music editor Chris Ledesma, as the episode was being recorded, "there were only sounds of crowd cheering during that shot and Matt said we needed to spice it up somehow." After going through some different ideas, the staff settled on a commentator shouting "goal!". The staff members wanted Groening to provide the voice and he finished the recording in two takes.

In a 2013 interview with former show writer Conan O'Brien, showrunner Al Jean stated that this episode was intended to serve as a series finale in the case that cast negotiations earlier in the year forced the show to end.

== Reception ==
"Holidays of Future Passed" originally aired on the Fox network in the United States on December 11, 2011. The episode was watched by approximately 6.43 million people during this broadcast, and in the demographic for adults aged 18–49, it received a 3.0 Nielsen rating and a seven percent share.

"Holidays of Future Passed" became the most-watched broadcast in Fox's Animation Domination lineup for the night in terms of total viewers. For the week of December 5–11, 2011, the episode placed twentieth in the ratings among all prime-time network broadcasts in the 18–49 demographic.

Since airing, "Holidays of Future Passed" has received highly positive reviews from television critics, particularly for its humor and emotional scenes.

In his list of "The 50 Best TV Episodes of 2011", BuddyTV's John Kubicek placed the episode at number forty-nine, writing that the "various glimpses of how all the other characters have changed during the time jump was a cavalcade of comedy moments."

Rex Huffman of The Times-Reporter cited it as "an amusing episode", and Ology's Josh Harrison described it as "legitimately funny". Harrison noted that "seeing so many futuristic versions of familiar characters put an interesting spin on the holiday season." He also commented: "The whole episode hinges on a surprisingly heartfelt scene that sees Bart and Lisa—both a bit sloshed—meeting up in the treehouse to discuss the challenges of parenting."

Similarly, Hayden Childs of The A.V. Club wrote that "Holidays of Future Passed" found "a sweet spot that combined a barrage of non-stop jokes with a tenderness often lacking in latter-day Simpsons episodes. There is even a conversation between the adult Bart and Lisa that rings surprisingly true for adult siblings wrestling with their shared familial past."

Writing for HitFix, Alan Sepinwall cited "Holidays of Future Passed" as the best future-set episode of The Simpsons since the first one, "Lisa's Wedding". He noted that it was "the emotional side of things" that made the episode successful, such as the dissatisfaction Bart and Lisa feel because of their disconnection with the children, and also Homer's transformation into a "very wise, sweet guy after somehow surviving into old age." Sepinwall particularly praised the scene at the cryonics facility where Homer encourages the children to give Bart another chance as "really sweet", and he described the idea of a frozen Grampa as "a clever variation on the very familiar joke of how Homer and the family neglect [Grampa] because he's such a pain in the ass." Sepinwall also commended the episode for its jokes about the future, highlighting the scenes revolving around air travel as well as the scenes showing Krusty as "the Andy Rooney of 2041" and Ralph Wiggum as "an endless series of stupid clones who keep killing one another."

In February 2012, "Holidays of Future Passed" was listed by Matt Zoller Seitz of New York magazine as one of "Nine Latter-Day Simpsons Episodes That Match Up to the Early Classics". He noted that the "reconciliations between Bart and Lisa and their kids are moving." Screen Rant called it the best episode of the 23rd season.

At the 64th Primetime Emmy Awards in 2012, "Holidays of Future Passed" was nominated for the Primetime Emmy Award for Outstanding Animated Program (for Programming Less Than One Hour).

Additionally, J. Stewart Burns was nominated for the Writers Guild of America Award for Outstanding Writing in Animation at the 65th Writers Guild of America Awards for his script to this episode.

=== Response to Islamic references ===
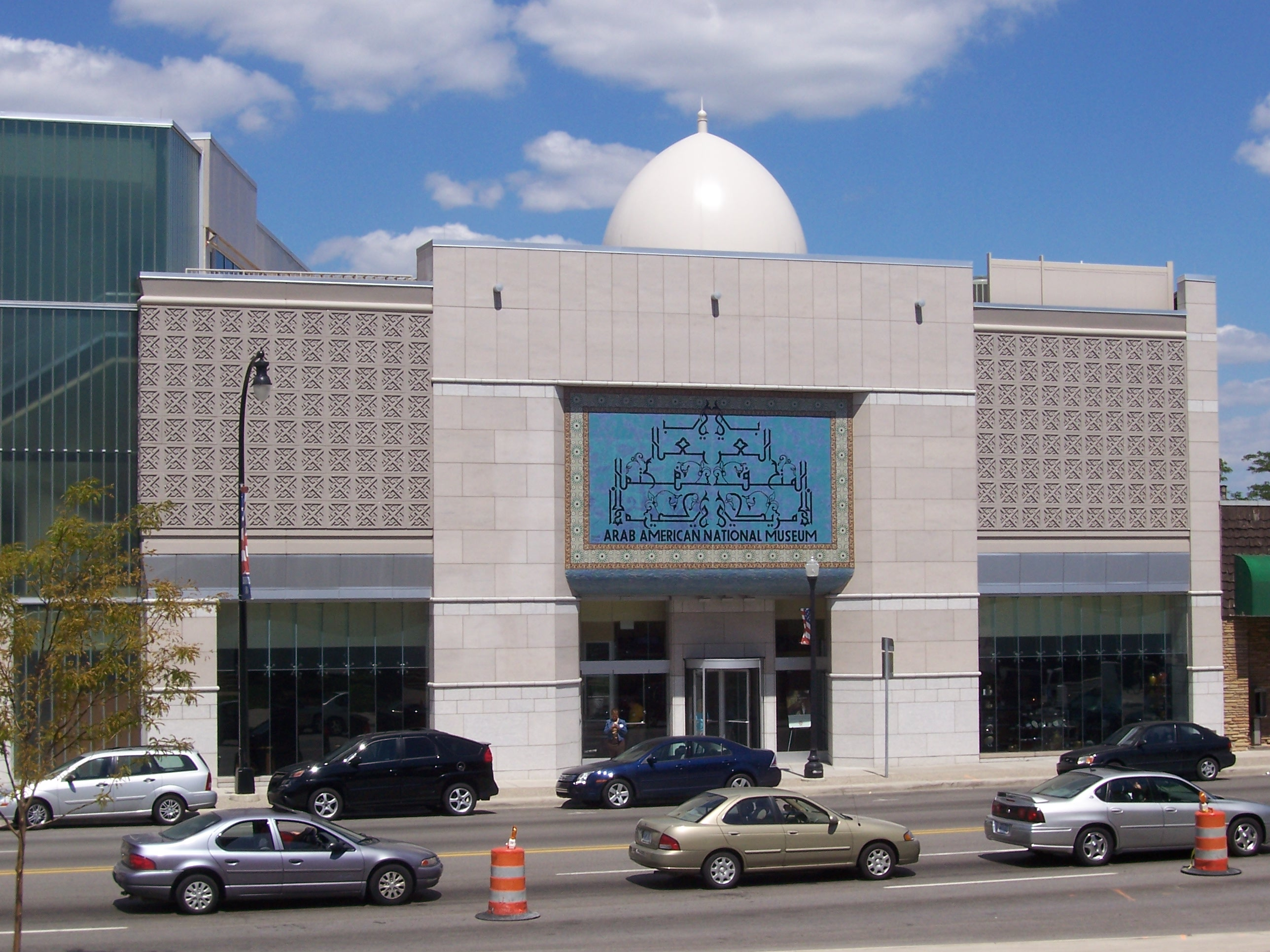
A scene portraying Dearborn, Michigan as under sharia law received a mixed reception in the city

A segment of "Holidays of Future Passed" was inspired by a controversy over the growing Islamic influence in the city of Dearborn, Michigan, which has "a significant Muslim community". The biggest mosque in the United States is also located there. During the segment in question, set in Milhouse and Lisa's future home, Milhouse tells Lisa that he has started to feel the symptoms of his seasonal allergies now that Christmas has arrived. He is apparently allergic to Christmas-related things such as holly, mistletoe, and the red part of candy cane. Lisa advises Milhouse to go and stay in Michigan over the holidays, where Christmas is not celebrated because it is "still under sharia law". Milhouse agrees to do this but complains that they always make him wear a veil there, pointing to a photo on the wall in which he is standing outside of the University of Michigan–Dearborn dressed in a burqa.

In a news report about this segment that aired on WJBK, Gallagher noted that it "poked fun at the untrue and unfounded notion that somehow Muslim sharia law prevails in Dearborn." Dawud Walid, head of the Michigan branch of the Council on American-Islamic Relations, commented in the report that The Simpsons "is a very prolific show. Now [it] is addressing this anti-sharia fear mongering issue, and perhaps it may gain some currency and ... more people will make fun of it."

== Home media ==
"Holidays of Future Passed" was included in the Season 16 DVD Box Set as a bonus episode, but has not received any other DVD release.

== See also ==
- "Days of Future Future", an episode that serves as a sequel to "Holidays of Future Passed"
