= Midnight Rx =

- The Simpsons episode
- Episode no.: Season 16; Episode 6
- Directed by: Nancy Kruse
- Written by: Marc Wilmore
- Production code: FABF16
- Original air date: January 16, 2005

Episode features
- Couch gag: The family rushes in and sits on the couch. Nothing happens. Lisa turns and says "What? Can't we sit on the couch without something happening?" Homer is then impaled with a large spear, and says "D'oh!"
- Commentary: Al Jean; Matt Selman; J. Stewart Burns; Michael Price; Tom Gammill; Max Pross; Joel H. Cohen; Nancy Kruse; David Silverman; Jeff Westbrook

Episode chronology
| ← Previous "Fat Man and Little Boy" | Next → "Mommie Beerest" |
- The Simpsons season 16

"Midnight Rx" is the sixth episode of the sixteenth season of the American animated television series The Simpsons. It originally aired on the Fox network in the United States on January 16, 2005, This is also the last holdover from the season 15's FABF production line but was pushed to the season 16. The episode was written by Marc Wilmore and directed by Nancy Kruse.

In this episode, Homer and Grampa go to Canada to smuggle prescription drugs to the townsfolk after their prescription drug plans are cancelled. The episode received mixed reviews.

== Plot ==
Mr. Burns reserves the Springfield Air and Space Museum for a plant company party. Lisa notes that Burns is being oddly nice, and she's right to be suspicious: at the party's end, Burns announces that he will terminate the prescription drug plan (as noted by Lisa, who mentions that the invites for the party stated that there was to be a "nasty surprise"). The workers chase after him, but Burns is able to escape in a wacky flying machine, based on the Pitts Sky Car. At home, the Simpsons try to figure out how they can afford the many, many prescription drugs that the four talking members of the family need. Homer decides to get another job, but he cannot have his choice of starring on Friends as Rachel's Irish cousin, and is unable to get a new job. Other companies follow Burns's lead and all prescription drug plans in the town are canceled. Marge and Lisa go to the pharmaceutical company to voice their concerns, but the executive meeting with them instead plays the music video for the Huey Lewis and the News song "I Want a New Drug" and immediately runs off.

At the retirement home, all prescription drugs are unaffordable and the staff decide to let the old folks go cold turkey and just see who survives. Grampa Simpson comes up with a plan to go to Winnipeg and get help from one of Grampa's Canadian friends, where they are able to get unlimited access to the drugs they need via fake IDs. They take them back into the United States and are praised in Springfield as heroes. Later, as Grampa and Homer plan to do more smuggling tripsm. Apu and Ned ask if they can tag along with them, stating that their children are desperate to get their medicine. Homer accepts and allows them on the trip, even though Ned tries to convert Apu on the way (despite the fact he claims to be sarcastically congratulating him on his bravery of worshiping an idol). Ned even meets his Canadian counterpart, but takes an instant dislike to him when he offers Ned a "reeferino". While approaching a border patrol, Apu burns his tongue on some hot coffee and starts ululating, and Ned wraps a cold towel around Apu's head in an attempt to help him cool off. The combination of these factors fools a border guard into thinking Apu is 'expressing his faith' as a Muslim (despite being Hindu), causing the whole border patrol to hold the men at gunpoint. Homer tries to pacify the situation, but unfortunately, he accidentally slips out a large amount of pills on the pavement while opening the door, exposing their smuggling. They're all arrested and deported on condition none of them ever return to Canada.

Meanwhile, Smithers realizes that he will die the next day after his thyroid becomes a goiter as he can no longer afford the medicine he needs that was provided under the power plant's drug plan. Burns vows to save his life, so he takes Homer and Grampa along in his plane, the "Plywood Pelican", which he built for Nazi Germany. After getting the drugs, while flying back to Springfield, the plane loses altitude in a storm and Burns jumps off with Homer and Grampa's parachutes, as they are "gifts" for his nephews. They crash-land in Springfield Town Square, almost crushing Chief Wiggum's squad car. Wiggum arrests Grampa but the people of Springfield protest, as his smuggling has gotten them the medicine they need. Seeing how much Grampa had been helping for the whole town, Wiggum lets Grampa go free under a nonexistent clause in the SPD handbook. In the meantime, Smithers is revived with a kiss from Burns after receiving his medicine. Burns decides to restore the drug plan to all full-time employees. During the celebration to Burns' rescue of Smithers and the return of the drug plan, Homer is reclassified as a SNPP "freelance consultant" and wonders what the lump on his neck is.

== Reception ==
=== Viewing figures ===
The episode earned a 2.9 rating and was watched by 8.11 million viewers, which was the 65th most-watched show that week.

=== Critical response ===
In 2013, Colin Jacobson of DVD Movie Guide thought the episode commentary on health care was not as relevant as it was when it first aired. He like the scene with the Canadian Flanders.

On Four Finger Discount, Guy Davis and Brendan Dando liked the episode and highlighted the pairing of Ned and Apu. They thought the plot of a group of people going on an adventure reminded them of the sixth season episode "Lemon of Troy".

=== Purported foreshadowing ===
In the episode, Ned is offered marijuana by a Canadian who looks like him because it is legal there. In 2018, when Canada legalized it for recreational use, it was reported that the episode had predicted its legalization.
