= Treehouse of Horror XV =

- The Simpsons episode
- Promotional image for the episode's second segment
- Episode no.: Season 16; Episode 1
- Directed by: David Silverman
- Written by: Bill Odenkirk
- Production code: FABF23
- Original air date: November 7, 2004

Episode features
- Commentary: Al Jean; Bill Odenkirk; Matt Selman; Tim Long; Tom Gammill; Max Pross; David Silverman; Raymond S. Persi

Episode chronology
← Previous "Fraudcast News"	Next → "All's Fair in Oven War"
- The Simpsons season 16

"Treehouse of Horror XV" is the first episode of the sixteenth season of the American animated television series The Simpsons. It originally aired on the Fox network in the United States on November 7, 2004. In the fifteenth annual Treehouse of Horror, Ned Flanders' head injury gives him the power to predict others' deaths, Bart and Lisa play detective when a string of Victorian-era prostitutes are murdered by Jack the Ripper, and the Simpsons go on a fantastic voyage inside Mr. Burns' body to save Maggie. It was written by Bill Odenkirk and directed by David Silverman. Around 11.29 million Americans tuned in to watch the episode during its original broadcast. Airing on November 7, it is the latest date that a Treehouse of Horror has aired, (tied with "Treehouse of Horror XXI") but had to be held back a week due to Fox's contractual obligation to air the World Series.

== Plot ==
=== Opening sequence ===
Kang and Kodos star in a fictional sitcom, entitled Keepin' it Kodos. In it, Kodos is preparing their boss' visit by cooking dinner: Homer on a baking tray (continually eating himself), Bart on a skillet, Marge and Maggie in pies and Lisa in a soup (with Bart seemingly being the only family member to be in pain). The boss gives the meal a delicious rating, but his stomach bursts, liberating Bart. Kang and Kodos are given a hyper-galactic promotion, much to the aliens' delight. Bart is sad about the loss of his parents and sisters, but Kang and Kodos decide to adopt him, which comforts Bart. The theme song from Perfect Strangers plays as the Treehouse of Horror logo appears on the screen; an alien tentacle stamps the "XV" underneath which makes it say the title of the episode in the fashion of the Mark VII Limited company logo.

=== The Ned Zone ===
In a parody of The Dead Zone, Homer tries to get his frisbee from the roof by throwing a bowling ball after it. The ball strikes a passing Ned Flanders on the head. When Ned recovers in Dr. Hibbert's hospital, he has a vision of Hibbert falling out of a window to his death. Homer then asks Hibbert to retrieve his frisbee from a ledge on the hospital. As Hibbert reaches for the ledge, he slips out of the window, causing Ned's vision to come true. Ned realizes that he can see the deaths of people whom he touches. After he gets out of the hospital, he attempts to save Hans Moleman from falling down but has a vision of him being eaten by alligators. In shock, he drops Moleman into an open manhole with dozens of alligators swimming in it. He also predicts the closing of the Rosie O'Donnell musical, which he already suspected.

A later vision depicts him shooting Homer, which horrifies Ned, leading him to try and conceal it from Homer and prevent it from coming true by leaving Springfield. When Homer finds out, he taunts Ned and even gives him Chief Wiggum's gun to shoot him with, and says he could not even shoot him by accident. Ned refrains from shooting Homer, seemingly changing the future, but then has another vision of Homer blowing up Springfield by pressing the "Core Destruct" button at the nuclear power plant. Ned tries to dissuade Homer from going to work, but Homer goes anyway because there is an ice cream cake for Lenny's birthday. Ned rushes to the power plant to stop Homer. Unfortunately, Ned's warning is scrambled by static over the intercom, sounding as if he is encouraging Homer to press the button. In desperation, Ned grabs a nearby security guard's gun to shoot Homer, fulfilling the original prediction, but in his death throes, Homer presses the destruct button with his tongue, much to Ned's fury before the power plant explodes and Springfield is destroyed. Ned and the Simpsons go to Heaven as angels, with Marge accusing Homer of blowing up Springfield just to get out of cleaning the garage (which also entered Heaven as an angel). Just as Homer muses over whether he could blow up Heaven, they meet God (again), who proceeds to give Homer "what he deserves" – his frisbee.

=== Four Beheadings and a Funeral ===
In a parody of From Hell, taking place in 1890, London's prostitutes are being killed with swords in a series of unsolved murders by "The Muttonchop Murderer". Scotland Yard's Inspector Wiggum challenges master detective Eliza Simpson (Lisa) and her easily amazed, goofy assistant Dr. Bartley (Bart) to solve the crime, though he orders Apu arrested anyway until they "find somebody darker" to frame. Their first piece of evidence is a bloody sword found by a "proper-Cockney flower girl", Marge. Eliza takes the sword to an oddities merchant (Comic Book Guy), who recognizes the sword as part of a set he had sold, called The Seven Swords of Osiris. He goes to check his dusty record books to see who he sold the swords to, but is murdered by the killer. Looking at the ledger, Simpson and Bartley discover the swords were sold to C. Ebenezer Burns, an industrialist who "makes coal out of babies". Bartley knows where to find Burns and tracks him down at Mao's Den of Inequity, an opium den. Burns instantly recognizes the sword, and tells Simpson that he sold them for opium to a "fat man with sideburns", and notices a man nearby who resembles the description, Homer. Eliza and Bartley chase him down and Homer gets caught by Wiggum, who happens to be at the opium den as well, because smoking opium is the only thing that helps his son Ralph go to sleep.

Eliza and Bartley congratulate themselves for solving the crime, until they find another body, Selma, stabbed by another Sword of Osiris. Bartley first dismisses the body as having been killed days prior, pointing out the body as bloated and the face rotten, though Selma stays alive long enough to say it was just "5 minutes ago". Eliza takes the sword and recognizes a certain scent on the sword handle. The next day, just before Homer is hanged for the murders, Eliza arrives, declaring Homer innocent due to the smell of eel pie on the handle, which Wiggum loves to eat. Officer Lou then reveals that Wiggum has muttonchops as well, exposing him as the killer. He starts to explain that he just wanted to come up with a case that Eliza herself could not solve, but then flees in a hot-air balloon stolen from Professor Frink, but it gets pierced by a steampunk-style flying saucer flown by Kang and Kodos, who consider Earth's air fleet as destroyed. It is then shown that the whole story was an opium-caused dream by Ralph, which Wiggum reveals is part of an even crazier and fantastical dream that both of them are in.

=== In the Belly of the Boss ===
In a parody of Fantastic Voyage, at the "Invention Expo", Professor Frink creates a machine that shrinks objects. Maggie crawls inside a giant pill, thinking that it is a ball pit, which is miniaturized and swallowed by Mr. Burns. When the rest of the family realizes what has happened, they agree to be shrunk within a craft and injected into Burns' body. Homer is the craft's captain, Lisa is in charge of science and research, Bart is in charge of security, and Marge is in charge of helping the deeps of the science. When Homer refuses to follow Frink's instructions, the ship gets stuck in Burns' heart. The crew manage to get the ship free from the outside and are able to reach the stomach by catching a ride on a nerve impulse, which Lisa calls "the body's information superhighway". They manage to save Maggie, but Homer is forced to leave the ship and save the rest on his own when their craft does not have enough power to save them all due to the addition of Maggie's extra weight. Homer becomes initially despondent at his family is forced to leave him behind, but finds consolation in finding a marshmallow in Burns' stomach. The submarine successfully escapes, but there is not enough time to save Homer, who instantly returns to his original size inside Burns' skin, putting them both in extra pain. Even though Homer complains that Burns needs several extra holes, Burns is confident that things will work out. The episode ends with Burns and Homer leading a dance to the tune of "I've Got You Under My Skin" (along with the characters from all three segments and the opening sequence). The Perfect Strangers theme is then played again over the end credits featuring still images from the episode.

== Reception ==
The episode has received mixed reviews from television critics. Pip Ellwood Hughes was positive and said "In the Belly of the Boss" was the best segment of the three. Kevin Yeoman disliked the episode saying "much of it was old hat, and comfortably so. The best example of this is in the 'Treehouse of Horror XV' episode, which not only fails to elicit a single laugh, but also demonstrates how much the annual tradition had come to rely on spoofing pop-culture or horror films, rather than using the conventions of the genre to craft something funny and memorable. The execrable 'Four Beheadings and a Funeral' and 'In the Belly of the Boss' showing just how unfunny and lazily written these Halloween episodes can sometimes be." Chris Morgan of Cinema Sentries thought the quality of the episode was questionable. On John Hugar's top 25 Treehouse of Horror episodes he placed the episode at #21. He enjoyed "The Ned Zone" but thought "Four Beheadings and a Funeral" "bland" and "In the Belly of the Boss" done better before. When ranking the top 78 Treehouse of Horror segments Louis Peitzman was positive on the segments. He placed "The Ned Zone at #56 and said "it's fairly well done" but said "like so many early 2000s episodes, it goes too far." "Four Beheadings and a Funeral" was put at #49 and said "The distinctive look of the segment is great, and the murders are gruesome, but the mystery-solving itself isn’t worth more than a shrug." "In the Belly of the Boss" was placed highest at #44 and he thought it had its moments.
