= The Father, the Son, and the Holy Guest Star =

- The Simpsons episode
- Promotional artwork for the episode, featuring Homer with Father Sean (guest star Liam Neeson).
- Episode no.: Season 16; Episode 21
- Directed by: Michael Polcino
- Written by: Matt Warburton
- Production code: GABF09
- Original air date: May 15, 2005

Guest appearances
- Liam Neeson as Father Sean; Marcia Wallace as Edna Krabappel

Episode features
- Couch gag: The Simpsons are depicted as parade balloons that float to the couch. The Homer balloon, however, ends up getting popped by Snowball II.
- Commentary: Al Jean; Matt Warburton; Matt Selman; Tim Long; Michael Price; Tom Gammill; Max Pross; Hank Azaria; Tress MacNeille; Michael Polcino

Episode chronology
← Previous "Home Away from Homer"	Next → "The Bonfire of the Manatees"
- The Simpsons season 16

"The Father, the Son, and the Holy Guest Star" is the twenty-first and final episode of the sixteenth season of the American animated television series The Simpsons. It originally aired on the Fox network in the United States on May 15, 2005. The episode was written by Matt Warburton and directed by Michael Polcino.

In this episode, Marge enrolls Bart in Catholic school after he is expelled from Springfield Elementary for performing a prank. Liam Neeson guest starred as Father Sean. The episode received mixed reviews.

Originally supposed to air April 10, the episode was dropped from the week's schedule due to the death of Pope John Paul II, since this episode revolved around Catholicism. This episode is also the 350th episode in production order (in broadcast order, "Future-Drama" is the 350th episode).

== Plot ==
After Bart is expelled from school after being blamed for Groundskeeper Willie's prank unleashing hundreds of rats during the school's medieval festival, Marge enrolls him in St. Jerome's Catholic School, where Bart's rebel attitude is frowned upon. Bart meets a sympathetic Father Sean, who gives him a comic book about saints, and he is drawn into it. Marge becomes concerned over Bart's interest in the Catholic Church, due to the Catholic ban on birth control. Homer goes to the school to confront Sean, but decides to convert to Catholicism as well for easy absolution of his sins. With Bart and Homer considering joining the Church, Marge seeks help from Rev. Lovejoy and Ned Flanders, who agree to get them back.

On the road, Marge, Ned and Lovejoy try to bring Bart back to the "one true faith" – The Western Branch of American Reform Presbylutheranism – by taking him to a Protestant Youth Festival where Marge tries bribing him with rock music and paintball, only for Homer and Sean to arrive there in a motorcycle and sidecar; having been alerted by Lisa, who agrees with Homer and Bart's desire to join a new faith, and engage in a Mexican standoff with Ned and Lovejoy. Bart mocks the feuds between the different forms of Christianity, explaining that the topics they disagree on are nothing compared to the topics they agree on. The two groups agree to fight monogamist gays and stem cells, taking Bart's idea to heart.

The episode then jumps 1,000 years into the future, when Bart is believed to be the last Prophet of God. Mankind is waging war over whether Bart's teachings were about love and tolerance, or understanding and peace (and whether he was betrayed by Milhouse). Engaging in a bloody battle, one side cries Bart's catchphrase "Eat my shorts", the other cries "Cowabunga".

== Production ==
The episode features Liam Neeson, guest starring as Father Sean. Joe Mantegna was originally announced to guest star as Fat Tony, but inexplicably did not appear in the final episode. The episode originally had Fat Tony suggest to Marge to enroll Bart in Catholic school.

== Release ==
The episode aired immediately following the previous episode as part of a one-hour season finale. The episode was originally scheduled to air on April 10, 2005. However, due to the death of Pope John Paul II in April 2005, the episode was postponed, and a repeat of the episode "On a Clear Day I Can't See My Sister" aired instead.

== Reception ==
=== Viewing figures ===
The episode earned 3.5 rating and was watched by 9.69 million viewers, which was the 38th most-watched show that week.

=== Critical response ===
Colin Jacobson of DVD Movie Guide thought the episode was a "lackluster finale" but said it was better than "Thank God, It's Doomsday", which also dealt with religion.

On Four Finger Discount, Guy Davis and Brendan Dando liked the performance by Liam Neeson. They highlighted the scene depicting Catholic Heaven, saying "it looks dope".

Eric Goldman, Dan Iverson, and Brian Zormski of IGN called this episode the best episode of the sixteenth season. They thought of it as a great episode that dealt with the sensitive topic of religious tolerance, stating that "with a daring story, we can't help but remember when The Simpsons was an edgy hip show that would frequently shed a light on cultural complexes". They thought it would be ideal if there were more episodes like this one.

L'Osservatore Romano, the daily broadsheet of the Vatican, praised the episode for taking up issues such as Christian faith and religion. It insisted that Homer is a Catholic, but executive producer Al Jean responded by saying that Homer is not a Catholic.

=== Awards and nominations ===
Matt Warburton was nominated for the Writers Guild of America Award for Television: Animation at the 58th Writers Guild of America Awards for his script to this episode.
