= Home Away from Homer =

- The Simpsons episode
- Episode no.: Season 16; Episode 20
- Directed by: Bob Anderson
- Written by: Joel H. Cohen
- Production code: GABF15
- Original air date: May 15, 2005

Guest appearance
- Jason Bateman as himself

Episode features
- Chalkboard gag: "A booger is not a bookmark"
- Couch gag: The Simpsons sit on the couch as normal. The camera zooms out to reveal that the couch is attached to the lure of an anglerfish, which swallows them all.
- Commentary: Al Jean; Joel H. Cohen; Matt Selman; Carolyn Omine; Tim Long

Episode chronology
← Previous "Thank God, It's Doomsday"	Next → "The Father, the Son, and the Holy Guest Star"
- The Simpsons season 16

"Home Away from Homer" is the twentieth episode of the sixteenth season of the American animated television series The Simpsons. It originally aired on the Fox network in the United States on May 15, 2005. The episode was written by Joel H. Cohen and directed by Bob Anderson.

In this episode, Ned is humiliated and leaves town after he accidentally rents a room in his house to two women to perform pornography. Actor Jason Bateman appeared as himself. The episode received mixed reviews.

== Plot ==
Lisa calls in to an unpopular public radio station and wins tickets for four to an Albanian movie called Kosovo Autumn. Homer leaves Maggie with Ned Flanders, who agrees to babysit free of charge, while the rest of the family watches the movie. When Marge picks up Maggie and hastily offers to pay, Ned admits to needing extra money as a giant retail store called Left-Mart is threatening his business. Marge suggests he rent out one of his rooms to someone. He agrees, giving the room to Katja and Vicky, two female community college students.

Taking advantage of his trusting nature, the two use their room as a staging area for a softcore pornographic website, sexyslumberparty.com. Bart and Milhouse come across a banner ad for the site and share their discovery with Homer, who proceeds to spread the news around town. Marge soon discovers Homer and Bart viewing the website and forces Homer to tell Ned everything. Ned angrily forces the girls to leave, but realizes that everyone has arrived to cheer for them. Horrified at both the town's mockery and Homer's betrayal, Ned leaves town, moving to "Humbleton, Pennsylvania", home of the porcelain "Humble figurines", which he collects. Angered by Homer's actions, Marge and Lisa tell him to be on his best behavior for their new neighbor, "Coach" Clay Roberts, who becomes a cynical bully towards Homer and litters the Simpsons' yard with Ned's fallen trees, cutting their cable, and siphoning gas from Homer's car.

Meanwhile, Ned finds the friendly pseudo-Germanic town of Humbleton to be everything he ever dreamed. However, when applying for a job at the Humbleton Figurine Workshop, the manager requests him to shave his moustache, declaring it "hippie-ish" and distracting. Ned briefly considers it, but soon decides it is more important than the opinions of the townspeople, who shun him.

Homer drives to Humbleton and pleads with Ned to return, who, upon seeing the judgmental faces of the Humbleton residents glaring at him, agrees. Clay refuses to leave the house, despite Ned pointing out that his $200,000 check bounced, thus he legally still owns the property, but is persuaded once Ned and Homer overpower him by sheer force. A few hours later, Homer obtains a pipe organ, which Ned believes is from the local church, and places it in Ned's backyard for a welcome-home party, which several Springfield residents attend. Ned is happy at the party, which soon irritates Homer.

== Production ==
Actor Jason Bateman appeared as himself.

== Release ==
This episode aired consecutively with the following episode as a one-hour season finale.

== Reception ==
=== Viewing figures ===
The episode earned a 2.9 rating and was watched by 8.17 million viewers, which was the 46th most-watched show that week.

=== Critical response ===
Colin Jacobson of DVD Movie Guide said the episode was a "pretty good show" and liked the first few minutes but the "rest doesn’t live up to the opening".

On Four Finger Discount, Guy Davis and Brendan Dando said "it was a fine episode", but the story was similar to previous episodes. They highlighted Homer being bullied by the neighbor.

=== Themes and analysis ===
David Feltmate cites this episode as an example of a "kind, caring Christian" practicing neighborly love. He writes that "Ned moves away after Homer humiliates him. Homer tracks him down, begging him to come back because the new neighbor is not nearly as gracious with Homer's failings as Ned has been. ...Despite its criticism of conservative Christian politics, The Simpsons thus promotes Christian charity as valuable."
