= The Seven-Beer Snitch =

- The Simpsons episode
- Episode no.: Season 16; Episode 14
- Directed by: Matthew Nastuk
- Written by: Bill Odenkirk
- Production code: GABF08
- Original air date: April 3, 2005

Guest appearances
- Frank Gehry as himself; Charles Napier as Officer Krackney; Joe Mantegna as Fat Tony

Episode features
- Couch gag: The Simpsons sit down on the couch. A roasting spit skewers the couch and the floor below pulls back to reveal a fiery pit. The Simpsons are then spun around over the heat. Marge's hair is soon on fire.
- Commentary: Matt Groening; Al Jean; Bill Odenkirk; Ian Maxtone-Graham; Matt Selman; Michael Price; Tom Gammill; Max Pross; Dan Castellaneta; David Silverman; Steven Dean Moore

Episode chronology
← Previous "Mobile Homer"	Next → "Future-Drama"
- The Simpsons season 16

"The Seven-Beer Snitch" is the fourteenth episode of the sixteenth season of the American animated television series The Simpsons. It first aired on the Fox network in the United States on April 3, 2005. The episode was written by Bill Odenkirk and directed by Matthew Nastuk.

In this episode, Mr. Burns turns the town's unpopular concert hall into a prison. After Homer is sent there when he is convicted of a minor crime, he reports on the prisoners' activities to the guards for rewards. Charles Napier guest starred as Officer Krackney, and architect Frank Gehry appeared as himself. The episode received mixed reviews.

== Plot ==
The Simpsons go to Shelbyville to see a musical, which paints Springfielders as hicks and morons. An angry Marge goes to Springfield's Cultural Advisory Board to brainstorm a plan to make Springfield more sophisticated and gets the idea to hire architect Frank Gehry to build a concert hall. Opening night proves to be a bust, and the concert hall falls into shambles from disuse.

Mr. Burns buys the hall and turns it into a state prison. Homer applies for a job as a guard, but is rejected after Otto switches his drug-laden urine sample with Homer's. Mr. Burns forces Chief Wiggum to reinstate old and forgotten laws to fill his prison with convicts and make more money. Homer is convicted after getting caught kicking a can five times down the street (which constitutes "illegally transporting litter").

Bart and Lisa notice that Snowball II has been gaining weight. Lisa follows her and discovers she has been visiting and eating food from another family, who believe she is theirs and named her "Smokey". Snowball prefers her second family to the Simpsons, to Lisa's dismay. Bart goes in to set the record straight, but instead the family fills him up with food and teaches him the same trick they taught Snowball.

Homer is sent to work in the prison kitchen and becomes a prison snitch after unwittingly alerting the guards of Snake's escape attempt. Homer is rewarded with food, special treatment, and a new plasma TV. The other prisoners learn he is a snitch after Marge shouts it out in the visitation room. After using a fake claim of a prison break to lure out all the guards, the prisoners attack Homer. Using the key to the concert hall given to her as head of the Springfield Cultural Activities Board, Marge finds Homer in the kitchen with the other prisoners on his tail. They take refuge in the gas chamber, where Marge scolds Homer about being an informant. The guards come in with tear gas and riot gear. As they are released, Homer tells Governor Mary Bailey about the prison's deplorable conditions and food. Bailey tells the prisoners that since there is no room left in the prisons they were transferred from, they will be put on a garbage barge and bare-knuckle box until someone emerges as their king, a plan the convicts applaud.

Homer is released, which pleases Marge, and heads out to Moe's after she falls asleep. He bumps into Snowball, who is still overweight and also approaching the bar. He promises not to tell on her if she does not tell on him.

Homer runs into the concert hall, claiming the building is a death trap, in response to a dream he had after watching The Towering Inferno.

== Production ==
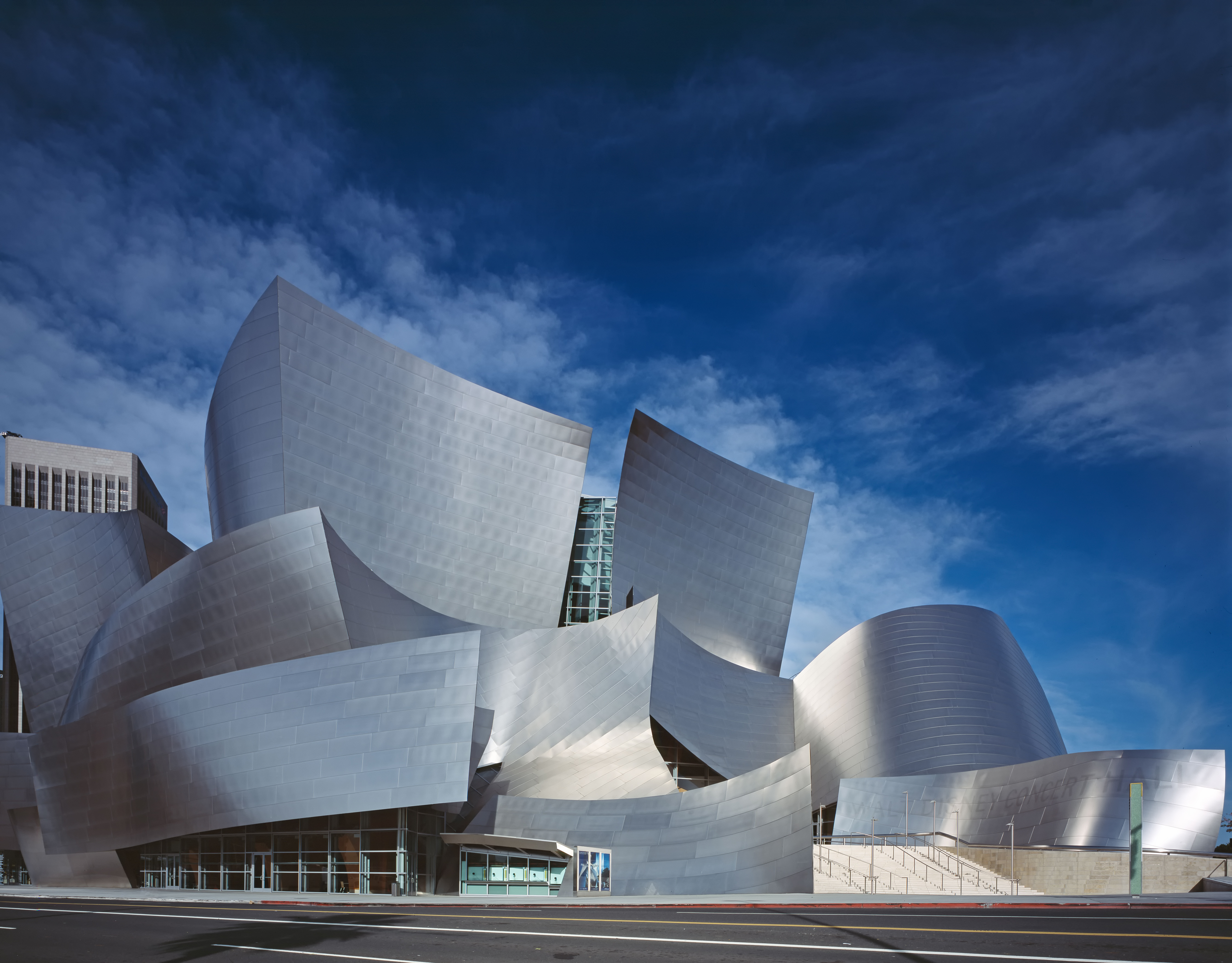
Walt Disney Concert Hall, designed by Gehry, is thought by many to have been inspired by a piece of crumpled paper.

Frank Gehry guest starred in the episode of himself, becoming the first architect to appear on The Simpsons. According to Matt Chaban of The New York Observer, "Because of his successful style, Frank Gehry sometimes comes under criticism for being a hack whose buildings all look the same—even if in their 50th iteration, those waving bands of metal still look amazing, fresh and different. This sensibility was, like so many other things, immortalized on The Simpsons." The episode makes fun of Gehry's architectural style in a throwaway gag, which sees Gehry becoming inspired for the design of the concert hall after crumpling up Marge's letter and hurling it to the ground. The crumpled letter becomes the model for the building. As a result of the scene, according to Gehry, many people believe this is how he actually received the inspiration for his real-life buildings, particularly the Walt Disney Concert Hall, though this is not the case. He told the public affairs show Fareed Zakaria GPS on CNN in September 2011 the gag was just "a fun – fun thing. But it has – it has haunted me. People do – who've seen The Simpsons believe it." He also commented that "Clients come to me and say crumple a piece of paper, we'll give you $100 and then we'll build it."

Charles Napier guest starred as Officer Krackney. He previously guest starred on the series as different characters starting with the twelfth season episode "Pokey Mom".

== Reception ==
=== Viewing figures ===
The episode earned a 2.7 rating and was watched by 7.48 million viewers, which was the 54th most-watched show that week.

=== Critical response ===
Walter J. Keegan, Jr. of TV Squad would have preferred more from Mr. Burns and noticed that Marge's intelligence was getting worse when she was describing Frank Gehry.

Colin Jacobson of DVD Movie Guide did not like that another episode had a plot about the town needing to raise money after the episode "There's Something About Marrying" aired earlier in the season. He said that while there were some "good scenes, the episode doesn't have a lot of life to it."

On Four Finger Discount, Brendan Dando and Guy Davis liked the return of the evil Mr. Burns instead of the old bumbling one but did not like that the subplot involving Bart did not have an ending.

In 2007, Simon Crerar of The Times listed Gehry's performance as one of the thirty-three funniest cameos in the history of the show.
