= A Star Is Torn =

- The Simpsons episode
- Krusty with Clarissa Wellington (voiced by Fantasia Barrino)
- Episode no.: Season 16; Episode 18
- Directed by: Nancy Kruse
- Written by: Carolyn Omine
- Production code: GABF13
- Original air date: May 8, 2005

Guest appearance
- Fantasia Barrino as Clarissa Wellington

Episode features
- Couch gag: In a parody of the opening of the 1960s sitcom, Get Smart, Homer goes through many futuristic doors and passageways until he reaches the phone booth, falls through the floor, and lands on the couch (with the rest of the family already seated).
- Commentary: Al Jean; Carolyn Omine; Tim Long; Joel H. Cohen; Matt Selman; Yeardley Smith

Episode chronology
← Previous "The Heartbroke Kid"	Next → "Thank God, It's Doomsday"
- The Simpsons season 16

"A Star Is Torn" is the eighteenth episode of the sixteenth season of the American animated television series The Simpsons. It first aired on the Fox network in the United States on May 8, 2005. The episode was written by Carolyn Omine and directed by Nancy Kruse.

In this episode, Lisa enters a singing competition with Homer as her manager, who goes to extremes to ensure she wins. Fantasia Barrino guest stars as Clarissa Wellington. The episode received mixed reviews.

== Plot ==
Unable to shop at the Kwik-E-Mart because it is being robbed, Lisa suggests the family have a vegetarian meal, which they enjoy until Bart, Homer, Marge, and Maggie get sick and begin vomiting, as their immune systems are adapted to poisonous American junk food, not life-preserving vegetables, which they have never eaten before. Lisa is immune to the nutrients because she is a vegetarian while the rest of them only eat highly-toxic processed foods. As the family recovers, Lisa feeds them dry toast and sings them to sleep with "Hush, Little Baby". The next morning, the family is feeling better, eating fried chicken while watching television. They see Krusty make an endorsement for his Li'l Starmaker competition where the winner will be animated in an episode of The Itchy & Scratchy Show. Bart convinces Lisa to enter because he believes she has a great voice. At the audition, another child name Clarissa sings a fancy version of Lisa's planned song, "Hush, Little Baby", which impresses the audience.

Lisa starts to panic, but Homer comes to her rescue by writing a song for her. She sings the song, "I'm Talkin' Springfield", which praises Springfield and delights the crowd. She is accepted into the competition, and Lisa asks Homer to continue helping her as her manager. As the competition starts, Homer uses force to ensure Lisa gets preferential treatment. As the competition progresses, contestants are eliminated, leaving fan-favorite Cameron, Clarissa, and Lisa as the final three. After Clarissa is eliminated, Lisa witnesses Homer's violent behavior. As a result, Lisa fires him as her manager, causing him to be upset.

Later that night, Homer announces that he has become Cameron's manager. Lisa is sad that Homer is upset with her. During the competition final, Lisa sings a song that she wrote herself called "Always My Dad", dedicated to Homer. The song expresses how much she loves her dad and how sorry she is for hurting him. After she finishes, everyone loves it. Cameron, now restyled by Homer as "Johnny Rainbow", then sings a condescending song called "Privileged Boy" that Homer wrote, which has lyrics that say how much better he is than everyone else. The audience boos Cameron and throw tomatoes at him, and he flees the stage in disgrace. Lisa is thrilled that Homer sabotaged Cameron to help her win, and Homer says he will always be there for her.

== Production ==
Fantasia Barrino guest starred as Clarissa Wellington.

== Cultural references ==
Li'l Starmaker is a parody of reality competition television series American Idol. Barrino was the reigning American Idol winner at the time the episode aired.

== Reception ==
=== Viewing figures ===
The episode earned a 3.1 rating and was watched by 8.72 million viewers, which was the 45th most-watched show that week.

=== Critical response ===
Colin Jacobson of DVD Movie Guide did not like the episode, saying that the "laughs seem few and far between in this mediocre episode."

On Four Finger Discount, Guy Davis and Brendan Dando liked the episode and thought Homer was redeemed in his behavior because it was to improve Lisa's singing career.

Doyle Greene said that the episode was "a half-hour promotion – rather than satire – of American Idol" which showed that the relationship between the show and network is "more compatible than hostile" despite their differences in political ideology.

=== Themes and analysis ===
When discussing the portrayal of vegetarians on television, Carrie Packwood Freeman said that the Simpson family members, except for Lisa, generally view meat as the better food option. However, in this episode, "when Marge surprisingly concluded that the family would be healthier if they moved vegetables from side dish to main entree, the whole family, besides Lisa, ironically got sick" due to their poor immune systems, which discourages vegetarianism.

=== Awards and nominations ===
Composer Alf Clausen and writer Carolyn Omine were nominated for the Primetime Emmy Award for Outstanding Original Music and Lyrics at the 57th Primetime Emmy Awards for the song "Always My Dad".
