= Bart to the Future =

- The Simpsons episode
- Episode no.: Season 11; Episode 17
- Directed by: Michael Marcantel
- Written by: Dan Greaney
- Production code: BABF13
- Original air date: March 19, 2000

Episode features
- Chalkboard gag: "Non-flammable is not a challenge".
- Couch gag: The living room is set up like a trendy night club (complete with a disco ball, a velvet rope, several clubbers, and a bouncer). The bouncer lets Marge, Lisa, Bart, and Maggie in, but sends Homer away.
- Commentary: Mike Scully; George Meyer; Dan Greaney; Matt Selman

Episode chronology
← Previous "Pygmoelian"	Next → "Days of Wine and D'oh'ses"
- The Simpsons season 11

"Bart to the Future" is the seventeenth episode of the eleventh season of the American animated television series The Simpsons. It originally aired on the Fox network in the United States on March 19, 2000. In the episode, Bart is shown a vision of his future as a wannabe rock musician living with Ralph Wiggum, while Lisa has become the President of the United States and tries to get the country out of financial trouble. "Bart to the Future" was the second episode of The Simpsons to be set in the future, following "Lisa's Wedding".

The episode was directed by Michael Marcantel and written by Dan Greaney, who wanted to explore what Bart's life would end up like. Several designs were made by the animators for future Bart, but Greaney did not think they matched the personality of the character and had to give clearer instructions on how he wanted him to look.

Reception of "Bart to the Future" by critics has been generally mixed. Around 8.77 million American homes tuned in to watch the episode during its original airing. In 2008, it was released on DVD along with the rest of the episodes of the eleventh season. The episode attracted renewed attention in the events leading up to the 2016 presidential election, because of a reference to the presidency of Donald Trump.

== Plot ==
The Simpsons drive to the park for a picnic but discover that it has been overrun by mosquitoes. While heading home, the family finds a Native American casino. Bart is turned away because he is 10 years old but is able to sneak in by hiding in ventriloquist Arthur Crandall's dummy case. During Crandall's performance at the casino, Bart bursts out of the case and gets caught by casino guards. He is sent to the casino manager's office, where the Native American man shows him a vision of how his future will turn out if he does not change his ways.

Thirty years into the future, Bart is a 40-year-old beer-drinking slacker trying to launch his music career after dropping out of DeVry Institute. He lives with his bandmate Ralph Wiggum in a beach cottage by the shore, where they are struggling to make ends meet and have resorted to mooching off Bart's parents and their neighbor Ned Flanders. The only gig Bart and Ralph can get is at a beach bar owned by Nelson Muntz, and even then, they are only paid in popcorn shrimp. The morning after their disastrous concert at Nelson's bar, Bart and Ralph find out that they have been evicted from their house.

Meanwhile, 38-year-old Lisa becomes "the first straight female President of the United States", and moves into the White House, to where Bart quickly moves in and invites their parents to live in, and his antics prove a burden on Lisa's political activities, much to Lisa's discomfort. Homer uses the time to search for gold buried by Abraham Lincoln on the grounds of the White House. When he finally locates the "gold", it is in fact a chest with a scroll in it that Lincoln had written on explaining that his "gold" is "in the heart of every freedom-loving American". Homer does not appreciate the metaphor and angrily curses Lincoln; when present-day Bart asks the manager about this subplot, he claims that he needed filler after the main vision became "too thin".

Bart disrupts one of Lisa's addresses to the nation to promote his music career, which leads Lisa to be branded unpopular when Bart sings to the public on live television that Lisa will be imposing a tax rise to get the country out of debt; the leaders of America's creditor nations then demand that America pay them back. Frustrated with his antics, Lisa distracts Bart by making him "Secretary of Keeping it Real." His conscience manifests in the form of Billy Carter's ghost, who reminds him that he is an embarrassment because of his actions and suggests he atone for his mistakes (although he does endorse the casino within the vision).

Bart steps in at Lisa's meeting with the leaders and uses his skills at stalling debt collectors to save the day, promising the money will soon be repaid in full, pleasing Lisa. As a thank-you, Lisa promises Bart to "legalize it". After the vision is over, Bart promises that he will change; the manager then disappears. Lisa finds Bart and tells him that the family has been kicked out of the casino after Homer pushed a waitress and Marge lost $20,000. Bart tells Lisa about his vision of the future where he has a rock band and a moped, while downplaying Lisa's future presidency as "some government job".

== Production ==
"Bart to the Future" was written by Dan Greaney and directed by Michael Marcantel as part of the eleventh season of The Simpsons (1999–2000). It was the second episode of the series to show the Simpson family's life in the future, following the season six episode "Lisa's Wedding" that aired five years earlier in 1995. Three more future-set episodes have been released since "Bart to the Future": "Future-Drama" (season 16, 2005), "Holidays of Future Passed" (season 23, 2011) and "Days of Future Future" (season 25, 2014). Greaney's inspiration for "Bart to the Future" came from "Lisa's Wedding". He and The Simpsons writer Matt Selman were sitting in Greaney's office one day, trying to come up with new episode stories, when they received the idea of making a companion piece to that episode. Greaney wanted to write an episode set in the future that focused on Bart instead of Lisa. He thought it would be interesting to explore how the future works out for "a guy like Bart, who doesn't pay attention to school work and is all about being cool."

Selman commented in an audio commentary for "Bart to the Future" that "the thing that really got the [Simpsons] writers excited about the episode was this very specific version of future Bart." Greaney identified this version as "the guy who blames everyone else and tells everyone else that they used to be cool, that it's everyone else's fault that his life hasn't gone the way he wants it to go." The Simpsons showrunner Mike Scully also noted that future Bart is the kind of person who is "always waiting for some big sort of cash payoff that he feels he's owed whether it be an insurance settlement, an inheritance, or something that's gonna come sooner or later." Greaney said that everyone in the writing room recognized these traits from people they knew and therefore everyone contributed to the episode by suggesting lines for Bart to say and things for him to do.

From left to right: Ralph, Bart, Homer and Marge in the future. The original designs of future Bart were different to the one used here.

According to Greaney, the animators originally designed future Bart as "cool and fun" and made several designs where he was "slim, attractive, and hip." Greaney did not think any of these designs went along with the personality he and the other writers had assigned to future Bart, so he told the animators to draw the character with belly fat, a ponytail, sags under his eyes, and one earring. Scully said on the audio commentary that he thought the design of Bart looked "great", though he added that it was "slightly disturbing" to see the older versions of Homer and Marge in the episode, and joked that it is "a little bit sad to watch cartoon characters age."

Greaney needed a setpiece for the episode that enabled him to get into a vision of the characters in the future, and The Simpsons writer George Meyer came up with the idea of the Indian casino. When Homer and Bart first enter the casino, Homer tells Bart that "Although they seem strange to us, we must respect the ways of the Indian." He proceeds to greet everyone in the casino by saying "Hi-how-are-you?" in the rhythm of a stereotypical Native American chant. This joke was pitched by Tom Gammill, and there was a debate among the staff of the show about whether or not to include it in the episode as Native Americans could find it offensive. However, according to Scully, Dan Castellaneta (who voices Homer) "did [the joke] so funny when we were at the table-read so we decided to put it in and risk offending."

== Release and reception ==
The episode originally aired on the Fox network in the United States on March 19, 2000. It was viewed in approximately 8.77 million households that night. With a Nielsen rating of 8.7, the episode finished 28th in the ratings for the week of March 13–19, 2000. It was the second highest-rated broadcast on Fox that week, following an episode of Malcolm in the Middle (which received a 10.0 rating and was watched in 10.1 million homes).

On October 7, 2008, "Bart to the Future" was released on DVD as part of the box set The Simpsons – The Complete Eleventh Season. Staff members Mike Scully, Dan Greaney, Matt Selman, and George Meyer participated in the DVD audio commentary for the episode. Deleted scenes from the episode were also included on the box set.

"Bart to the Future" has received mixed reviews from critics compared to "Lisa's Wedding", which was met with positive response. Nancy Basile of About.com listed it as one of the episodes she felt "shined in season eleven". While reviewing the eleventh season of The Simpsons, DVD Movie Guide's Colin Jacobson commented on "Bart to the Future", writing: "This kind of fantasy episode can be hit or miss, and that trend holds true here. However, more of 'Future' succeeds than flops. Though a few gags bomb, most of them prove pretty good. At no point does this become a classic, but it amuses much of the time."

Hayden Childs of The A.V. Club wrote in 2011 that the episode "was not so good, although better than many of the real stinkers yet to come at that point. Still, it utterly failed to rise to the challenge of 'Lisa's Wedding.'" In 2003, Ben Rayner of Toronto Star referred to "Bart to the Future" as "a lame 2000 outing" and noted that Entertainment Weekly "rightly dubbed [it] the 'worst episode ever'". Winnipeg Free Press columnist Randall King wrote in his review of season eleven that the episode "Alone Again, Natura-Diddily" (which features the death of the character Maude Flanders) was "proof that the dependably brilliant series could – and did – go seriously wrong when it turned 11. Killing off Maude was a sin compounded by the Bart to the Future episode [...]".

In his 2006 book Watching with The Simpsons: Television, Parody, and Intertextuality, Jonathan Gray analyzed the many advertisement parodies featured in The Simpsons. He commented on "Bart to the Future", writing: "As if ads in children's toys or in churches are not enough, in 'Bart to the Future', an episode in which an Indian shaman at a casino treats Bart to a vision of his future, even his vision is interrupted when future-Bart says, 'I guess I am an embarrassment', and a ghost responds, 'You sure are. But, hey, there's an embarrassment of riches at the Caesar's Pow-Wow Indian Casino. You can bet on it!' Here [...] The Simpsons uses parody with great effect, not only to illustrate how annoyingly and disrespectfully ads infringe on any territory, but also to mock their logic and rhetoric."

== Donald Trump presidency ==
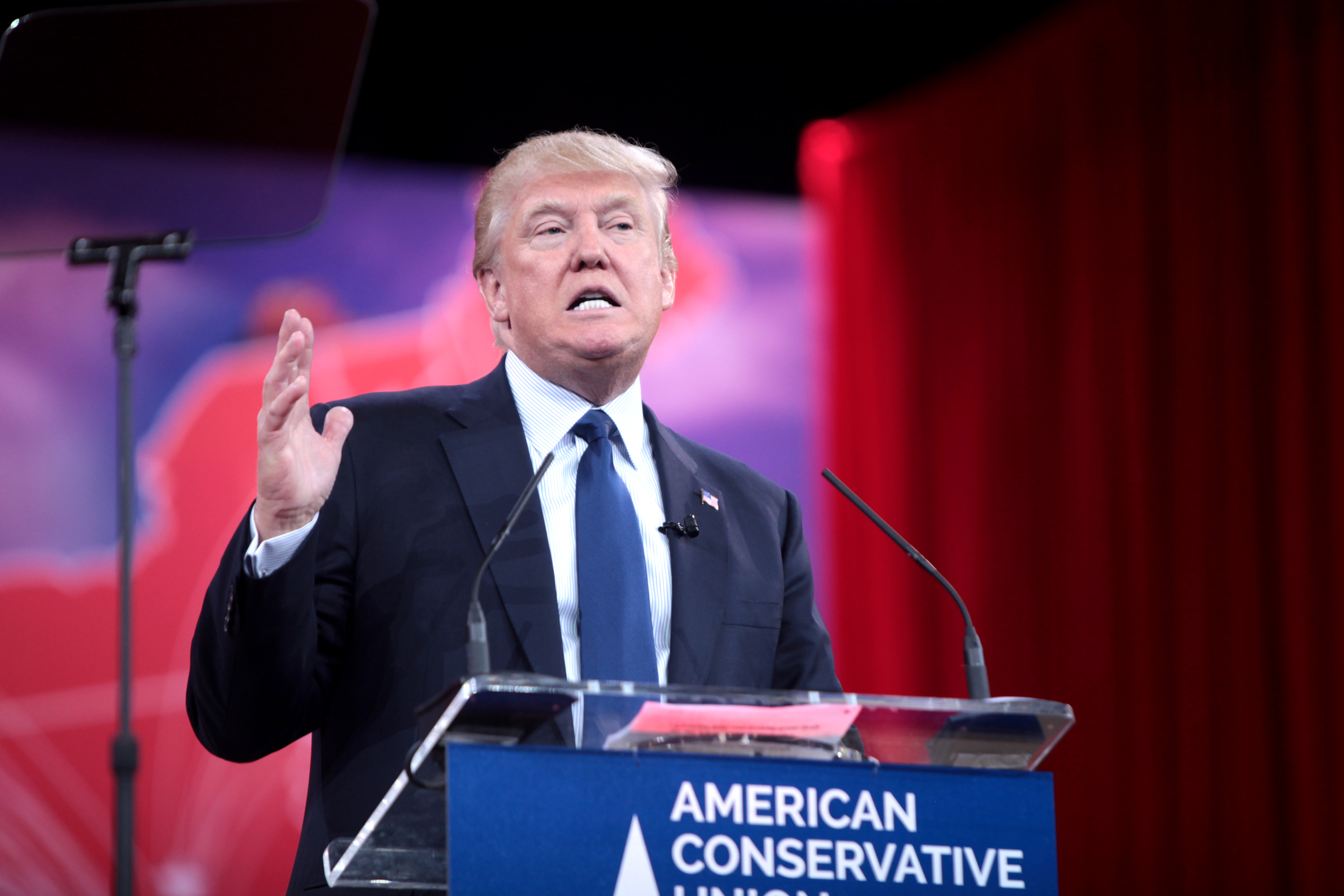
News media highlighted the mention of Donald Trump when he ran for president and won the election sixteen years later.

The episode heavily implies that real estate mogul Donald Trump became president, and caused a budget crisis that Lisa inherits as his successor. In 2015, news media cited the episode as a foreshadowing of Trump's future run for president; the episode was produced during Trump's 2000 third-party run. Dan Greaney told The Hollywood Reporter in a 2016 interview that the thought of a Trump presidency at the time "just seemed like the logical last stop before hitting bottom. It was pitched because it was consistent with the vision of America going insane." In an interview with TMZ in May 2016, Matt Groening said he thought it was unlikely that Donald Trump would become the president of the United States.

On November 8, 2016, Trump was elected as the 45th president of the United States. Four days later, in the opening credits of the episode "Havana Wild Weekend", aired on November 13, 2016, Bart writes "Being right sucks" as the chalkboard gag. Scenes from a 2015 Simpsons YouTube post "Trumptastic Voyage" (which references real-life scenes of Donald Trump around that time) have been mistakenly identified as those from "Bart to the Future". The episode attracted further attention in 2021 after the inauguration of Joe Biden when the dress Vice President Kamala Harris wore for the event was compared to Lisa's outfit in the episode. During the 2024 presidential election, Kamala Harris was nominated by the Democratic Party following President Biden's withdrawal from the election. Harris would ultimately lose the election to Trump, which in turn prompted further attention to the episode.

In 2026, Greaney declared his intent to run for president in 2028 to succeed Trump.
