= Thank God, It's Doomsday =

- The Simpsons episode
- Homer meets God in his dream
- Episode no.: Season 16; Episode 19
- Directed by: Michael Marcantel
- Written by: Don Payne
- Production code: GABF14
- Original air date: May 8, 2005

Guest appearances
- Baha Men sing "Who Wants a Haircut?"; Los Lobos play their version of the end credits

Episode features
- Couch gag: Everyone in the family looks like Moe Szyslak--including the female members.
- Commentary: Matt Groening; Al Jean; Don Payne; Ian Maxtone-Graham; Tim Long; Michael Price; Matt Selman; Tom Gammill; Max Pross; Michael Marcantel; David Silverman; Jeff Westbrook

Episode chronology
← Previous "A Star Is Torn"	Next → "Home Away from Homer"
- The Simpsons season 16

"Thank God, It's Doomsday" is the nineteenth episode of the sixteenth season of the American animated television series The Simpsons. It first aired on the Fox network in the United States on May 8, 2005. The episode was written by Don Payne and directed by Michael Marcantel.

In this episode, Homer calculates the date of the Rapture and angers the townsfolk when it does not occur, but he realizes he calculated the date incorrectly, resulting in only him ascending to Heaven. Musical groups Baha Men and Los Lobos appeared as themselves. Executive producer Al Jean claims that the commentary recording session for this episode was the last time he saw Payne. The episode received negative reviews.

== Plot ==
Marge tries to cut the kids' hair at home, but is stopped when Homer takes them to get haircuts at a new barbershop in the mall. The kids' haircuts are done so badly, due to Bart and Lisa messing each other's up, that they hide with Homer in a movie theater showing the film Left Below, a parody of Left Behind: The Movie. In response to the kids losing their hair, Marge later makes them wigs using the leftover hair trimmings. Homer now fears that the Rapture will soon be coming. Despite being consoled by Marge and Lisa, who think God would not end the world unless He announced it, Homer encounters signs suggestive of the Rapture. He uses numerology to calculate the date and time of the Rapture and concludes that it is only a week away.

Homer predicts that "stars will fall from the sky", then a blimp accident at the Krusty Celebrity Salute to Specials causes some celebrities, or "stars", to fall to their deaths. His prophecy causes many of Springfield's residents to believe that the world will end and they go with him to the Springfield Mesa to wait for the Rapture. A few hours pass without incident, and the people go home. All of them are annoyed at Homer, particularly Moe, who had sold his tavern to be converted to a Japanese sushi bar. Homer goes home and realizes that he has made an error in his calculation, so he returns to the Mesa with no support after getting ostracized by his family. Suddenly, he finds himself naked and ascending into Heaven.

Homer arrives in Heaven, where he is greeted by the tour guide who shows him around. He is then shown to his room where he requests to see his family on the big TV screen in his room. Marge and the children are shown being tormented by the devil. He has a talk with God about saving his family. When God refuses to help, due to Jesus' suffering on Earth, Homer becomes angry. He runs around vandalizing Heaven and gets stopped by security. God finally agrees to undo the Rapture by turning back time. Homer later wakes up on the mesa and is reunited with his family and discovers Moe's Tavern to curiously be back in its normal set up.

== Production ==
The musical group Baha Men reprised their roles as themselves. They previous appeared in the fourteenth season episode "Large Marge". The musical group Los Lobos also appeared as themselves dying in a blimp crash. They also play a version of the Simpsons theme over the end credits.

Execute producer Al Jean claimed that the final time he saw writer Don Payne before his death was for the recording of the DVD commentary for this episode.

== Cultural references ==
The Left Below film watched by Homer, Bart and Lisa is a pastiche of the Left Behind franchise. Homer says that the 1984 film Cannonball Run II haunted him for the rest of his life. In the final scene, Homer, his fellow bar patrons, and Moe form a tableau of the painting The Last Supper by Leonardo da Vinci.

== Release ==
The episode aired at 8:30 PM ET/PT immediately following the previous episode.

== Reception ==
=== Viewing figures ===
The episode earned a 3.6 rating and was watched by 10.05 million viewers, which was the 36th most-watched show that week and more than the preceding episode.

=== Critical response ===
Walter J. Keegan, Jr. of TV Squad said the "storylines are getting thin" to be writing an episode parodying the Left Behind franchise.

Colin Jacobson of DVD Movie Guide said the series does not "tend to handle religious subjects very well" and felt the episode lacked direction and jokes.

On Four Finger Discount, Brendan Dando thought the episode was uninteresting since he was not religious, and Guy Davis, having a more religious background, thought the episode did not go deep enough into the Left Behind franchise.

=== Awards and nominations ===
Writer Don Payne was nominated for a Writers Guild of America Award for Outstanding Writing in Animation at the 58th Writers Guild of America Awards for his script to this episode.
