= Michael Marcantel =

American animation director

Michael Marcantel is a former animation director on The Simpsons. He graduated from the California Institute of the Arts, where he studied in the Experimental Animation program under Jules Engel.

== Simpsons episodes ==
He has directed the following episodes:

=== Season Eleven ===
- "Bart to the Future"

=== Season Twelve ===
- "Day of the Jackanapes"

=== Season Thirteen ===
- "Weekend at Burnsie's"

=== Season Fourteen ===
- "A Star Is Born Again"

=== Season Sixteen ===
- "Thank God It's Doomsday"

=== Season Seventeen ===
- "Bart Has Two Mommies"

=== Season Eighteen ===
- "The Mook, the Chef, the Wife and Her Homer"
