= Fat Man and Little Boy (The Simpsons) =

- The Simpsons episode
- Episode no.: Season 16; Episode 5
- Directed by: Mike B. Anderson
- Written by: Joel H. Cohen
- Production code: FABF21
- Original air date: December 12, 2004

Guest appearances
- Eric Idle as Declan Desmond; Terry W. Greene as Sgt. Activity

Episode features
- Couch gag: The Simpsons sit on the couch as normal. The camera zooms out to reveal that the couch is attached to the lure of an anglerfish, which swallows the family.
- Commentary: Matt Groening; Al Jean; Matt Selman; Tim Long; Ian Maxtone-Graham; Joel H. Cohen; Michael Price; Mike Scully; Mike B. Anderson

Episode chronology
← Previous "She Used to Be My Girl"	Next → "Midnight Rx"
- The Simpsons season 16

"Fat Man and Little Boy" is the fifth episode of the sixteenth season of the American animated television series The Simpsons. It originally aired on the Fox network in the United States on December 12, 2004. The episode was directed by Mike B. Anderson and written by Joel H. Cohen.

In this episode, Bart makes money selling T-shirts, so a jealous Homer decides to support Lisa's science fair project. Eric Idle guest starred as Declan Desmond. The episode received mixed reviews.

== Plot ==
After losing his last baby tooth, Bart does not enjoy playing with his toys anymore and feels that he is maturing. To get out of his depression and express his emotions, Bart writes sarcastic and insulting phrases on his T-shirts. The shirts make him popular in town, and Bart sets up a stand in front of his house selling them. His business is shut down for not having a vending license, and he goes to a retailer's convention to obtain one. While leaving, he meets Goose Gladwell, a Willy Wonka-type salesman who sells joke products. Bart agrees to sell his shirts at Gladwell's stores, which turn in a considerable profit. When Homer is caught wearing one of Bart's shirts whilst sleeping on the job at the power plant, he is suspended without pay, and decides to quit since Bart is making so much money from t-shirt sales.

Fearing that Bart has replaced him, Homer decides to nurture Lisa. They quickly bond, and Homer sees her entry for the science fair: a history of nuclear physics and a scale model of the first nuclear reactor. However, Martin shows them his project, a childlike robot. Homer helps Lisa ensure her project's victory by stealing plutonium from the power plant and using it to make her reactor fully operational. He shows it to Lisa, she is horrified when she discovers it is dangerous, and alerts Marge, who tells Homer to get rid of it.

Meanwhile, Bart learns that Gladwell has sold the rights to the shirts to Disney under a contract that allows him to stop paying Bart. Homer stands up for Bart by threatening to detonate his nuclear reactor and destroy Gladwell's store. Gladwell accepts defeat, giving Bart and Homer all the money he has. As they leave, Bart thanks Homer for straightening things out. Happy to be back to their respective roles as father and son, Homer and Bart go to the dump to dispose of the nuclear reactor together.

== Cultural references ==
The title of the episode references the atomic bombings of Hiroshima and Nagasaki: "Fat Man" is the name of the bomb dropped on Nagasaki, and "Little Boy" was the one dropped on Hiroshima. At the start of the episode, Lisa and Janey sing "Miss Susie." Bart finds that the Tooth Fairy has donated in his name to the United Way of America, rather than giving him a quarter. The toys that Bart disposes of are based on Spirograph, Etch A Sketch, Hungry Hungry Hippos, Monopoly, Parcheesi, Silly Putty, and Rock 'Em Sock 'Em Robots. He gives his toys a Viking funeral, and the Sea Captain quotes Robert Frost's poem "Nothing Gold Can Stay". Marge and Homer list "support our troops" and "Keep On Truckin'" as examples of T-shirt slogans. Moe asks if Bart has any T-shirts with "Calvin peeing on Hobbes." This references the newspaper comic Calvin and Hobbes, and a series of bootleg stickers depicting Calvin urinating on various logos and symbols. The designs on Krusty's T-shirt line include Itchy dressed as Austin Powers, SpongeBob SquarePants, and a Confederate, and Scratchy modeled after Osama bin Laden. Lisa's model of science history contains displays of scientists Marie Curie, Wilhelm Röntgen, and Albert Einstein. Goose Gladwell looks similar to Willy Wonka from Charlie and the Chocolate Factory, and he sells the rights to Bart's shirts to The Walt Disney Company.

The episode features various real-life songs. "Dust in the Wind" by Kansas plays as Bart carries his toys to the ocean, and "I'm Too Sexy" by Right Said Fred is heard over a montage of Bart walking around town with his shirts. The introduction to Krusty's T-shirt display is accompanied by "Get Ready for This" by 2 Unlimited. Gladwell's car horn is a variation of "La Cucaracha." "The Pink Panther Theme" is set to a scene of Homer sneaking into the power plant.

== Reception ==
=== Viewing figures ===
The episode earned a 3.7 rating and was watched by 10.31 million viewers, the 31st most-watched show that week.

=== Critical response ===
ReviewStream wrote that "only the Simpsons can combine a Willy Wonka look-a-like[sic], a Robert Frost poem, and a Viking funeral all into one episode."

Colin Jacobson of DVD Movie Guide liked the beginning with Bart selling T-shirts but did not enjoy the episode becoming a Willy Wonka parody.

On Four Finger Discount, Guy Davis and Brendan Dando liked the episode. They enjoyed the "potent" idea of Bart growing up and being a provider and liked that Homer supported him in the end.
