= Bill Odenkirk =

American comedy writer (born 1965)

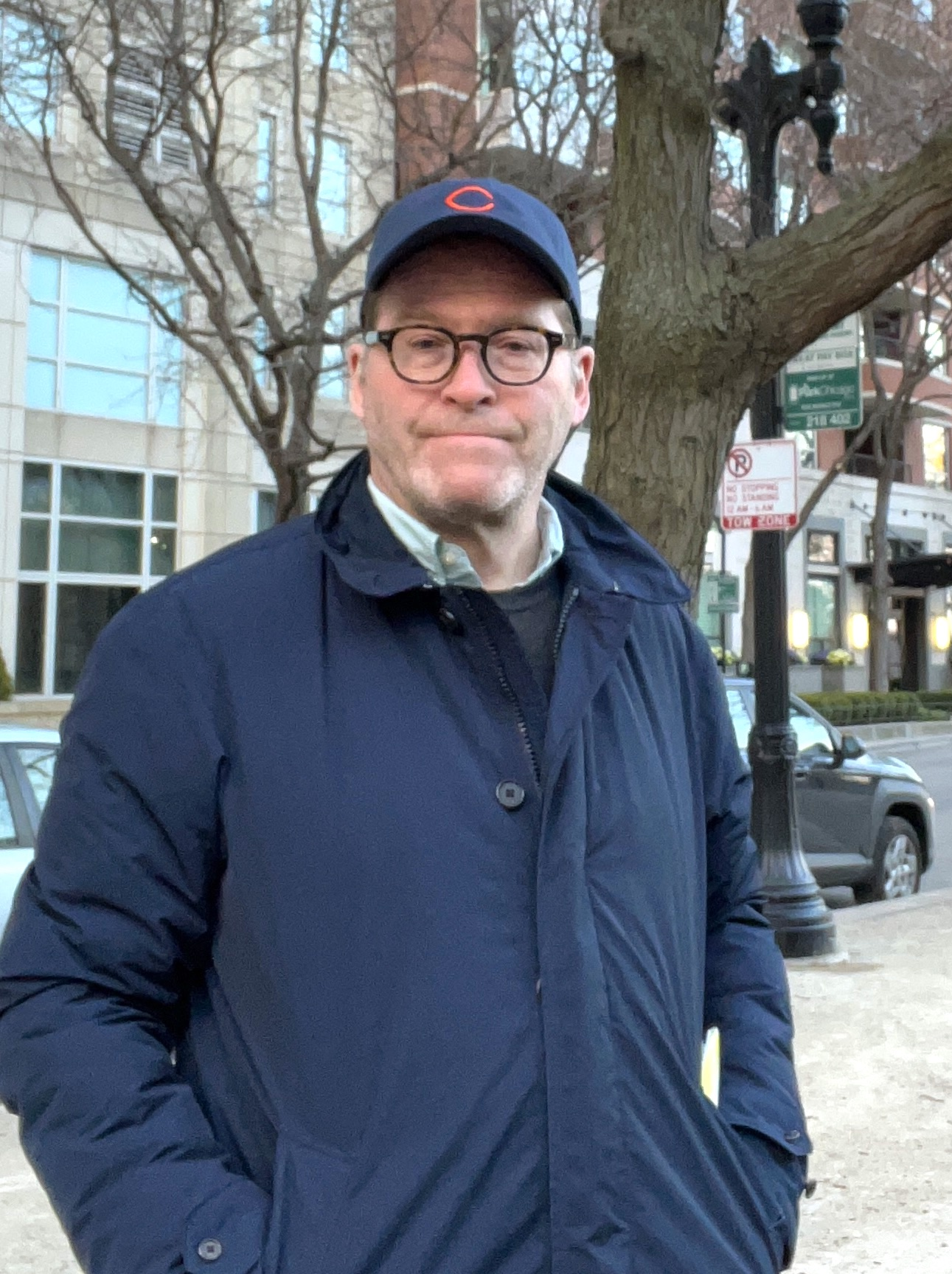
- Odenkirk in 2025
- Born: William Leonard Odenkirk; October 13, 1965 (age 61); Naperville, Illinois, U.S.
- Education: Loyola University of Chicago, University of Chicago
- Occupation: Television writer
- Relatives: Bob Odenkirk (brother)
- Writing career
- Years active: 1995–present
- Genre: Comedy

William Leonard Odenkirk (born October 13, 1965) is an American comedy writer. He is the younger brother of actor Bob Odenkirk.

== Biography ==
William Leonard Odenkirk was born on October 13, 1965, in Naperville, Illinois to Walter Henry Odenkirk (1930–1986), who was employed in the printing business, and Barbara Mary (née Baier) Odenkirk (1936–2021). He is the younger brother of American actor and comedian Bob Odenkirk, and worked as a writer, producer and actor on the HBO sketch comedy TV show Mr. Show with Bob and David, which featured his brother as co-star. Odenkirk went on to write for Tenacious D, Futurama, and Disenchantment. He has written and executive produced episodes of The Simpsons. He holds a PhD in inorganic chemistry from the University of Chicago.

== Writing credits ==
=== Tenacious D episodes ===
He is credited with writing the following episodes, along with Jack Black, David Cross, Kyle Gass, Tom Gianas, and Bob Odenkirk:

- "Death of a Dream"
- "The Greatest Song in the World"
- "The Fan"
- "Road Gig"

=== Futurama episodes ===
He is credited with writing the following episodes:

- "How Hermes Requisitioned His Groove Back" (2000)
- "A Tale of Two Santas" (2001)
- "Insane in the Mainframe" (2001)
- "Kif Gets Knocked Up a Notch" (2003)
- "The Farnsworth Parabox" (2003)
- "Planet Espresso" (2024)
- "Scared Screenless" (2025)
- "Lords of the Ring" (2026)
- "Oceans Three" (The Laff Boat) (2026)

=== The Simpsons episodes ===
He is credited with writing the following episodes:

- "Treehouse of Horror XV" (all three segments) (2004)
- "The Seven-Beer Snitch" (2005)
- "The Mook, the Chef, the Wife and Her Homer" (2006)
- "Crook and Ladder" (2007)
- "Double, Double, Boy in Trouble" (2008)
- "Million Dollar Maybe" (2010)
- "Love Is a Many Strangled Thing" (2011)
- "Adventures in Baby-Getting" (2012)
- "Pulpit Friction" (2013)
- "Super Franchise Me" (2014)
- "To Courier with Love" (2016)
- "The Last Traction Hero" (2016)
- "Grampy Can Ya Hear Me" (2017)
- "Forgive and Regret" (2018)
- "The Fat Blue Line” (2019)

=== Disenchantment episodes ===
Odenkirk is credited with writing the following episodes:

- "Steamland Confidential" (2021)
- "Love Is Hell" (2022)
- "The Pitter-Patter of Little Feet" (2022)
- "The Goo-Bye Girl" (2022)
- "Fish Out of Water" (2023)

=== Guru Nation project ===
A series developed for Paramount+ with Bob Odenkirk and David Cross.
