= Panic on the Streets of Springfield =

- The Simpsons episode
- Quilloughby, a character in the episode partly based on Morrissey.
- Episode no.: Season 32; Episode 19
- Directed by: Matthew Nastuk
- Written by: Tim Long
- Production code: QABF12
- Original air date: April 18, 2021

Guest appearances
- Benedict Cumberbatch as Quilloughby and Imaginary Quilloughby

Episode chronology
← Previous "Burger Kings"	Next → "Mother and Child Reunion"
- The Simpsons season 32

"Panic on the Streets of Springfield" is the 19th episode of the thirty-second season of the American animated television series The Simpsons, and the 703rd episode overall. It aired in the United States on Fox on April 18, 2021. The episode was directed by Matthew Nastuk, and written by Tim Long. In this episode, Lisa becomes obsessed with a cynical English singer named Quilloughby (based on Morrissey and voiced by Benedict Cumberbatch) who becomes her imaginary friend.

The episode received the highest audience on Fox that night, while its critical reception was mixed. It was criticized by Morrissey and his manager, who found the Quilloughby character inaccurate and offensive. The episode was dedicated in memory of Edwin E. Aguilar, an animator, character layout and assistant director of The Simpsons who died on April 11, 2021.

== Plot ==
Homer is to be prescribed a drug by Dr. Hibbert for his low testosterone, but when he sees a preview commercial for a high-torque truck, he buys that instead. The truck comes with a subscription to a music streaming service. Its algorithm recommends that Lisa should listen to The Snuffs, a 1980s British band fronted by morose vegan Quilloughby (parodies of The Smiths and Morrissey).

Lisa becomes a fan of the Snuffs and gets vegan tacos on the school menu, but they are mistakenly made with bacon. Upset and humiliated, she develops an imaginary friend in the form of Quilloughby. He gives her witty retorts to Bart and music teacher Mr Largo. Principal Skinner calls Homer and Marge to school to discuss Lisa's bad attitude. Marge considers Quilloughby to be the source of her daughter's rebelliousness, so she cancels the music subscription.

The imaginary singer advises Lisa to steal Homer's credit card to afford entry to a music festival, where the real Quilloughby is performing. She tires of the imaginary singer's cynicism, and both are shocked to see that the real one is now an overweight bigot with anti-immigrant views who has abandoned veganism. When the real Quilloughby is booed and chased off stage, the imaginary Quilloughby advises her not to be so negative that she ends up like his real-life counterpart before disappearing. Homer takes his truck out and Marge finds Lisa amidst the riot, saving her. Marge sees the similarity between Lisa's behavior and her own rebellious phase against her mother. She comforts Lisa and reassures her she will always be there for her.

== Production ==
Benedict Cumberbatch was cast as Quilloughby, Lisa's imaginary friend. Cumberbatch previously played two different roles in the twenty-fourth season episode "Love Is a Many-Splintered Thing."

Morrissey turned down an offer to play himself in "The Regina Monologues," a Britain-based episode of the 15th season of The Simpsons. According to writer Tim Long, the "Morrissey-esque" Quilloughby character is also based on other British singers, including Robert Smith of The Cure and Ian Curtis of Joy Division. The episode's original music was composed by Bret McKenzie of the New Zealand duo Flight of the Conchords. A full-length version of the original featured song "Everyone Is Horrid Except Me (And Possibly You)," written by McKenzie with vocals by Cumberbatch as Quilloughby and Yeardley Smith as Lisa, was released in May 2021 by Hollywood Records.

The episode was dedicated in memory of animator Edwin E. Aguilar. Aguilar worked on The Simpsons since 1999 as an animator, character layout artist, storyboard revisionist, assistant director, and other roles. He also worked on the 2007 Simpsons Movie.

An extended version of the episode was posted on Hulu after the episode aired.

== Cultural references ==
The episode's title parodies the lyrics to the Smiths' song "Panic," while the character Quilloughby sings "Hamburger Homicide," a parody of their song "Meat Is Murder." The band also has a song called "How Late is Then?," similar to "How Soon Is Now?" and another called "What Difference Do I Make?," similar to "What Difference Does It Make?" Homer's truck pulls up a tree that is labeled as Shel Silverstein's Giving Tree, a reference to the author's book. The imaginary younger Quilloughby believes that his real, older self looks like Winston Churchill. When Principal Skinner tells Homer and Marge that the children have been influenced by older music, Martin Prince is seen singing along to "Maneater" by Hall & Oates.

== Reception ==
=== Viewing figures ===
The episode earned a 0.41 rating and was watched by 1.31 million viewers, which was the most watched show on Fox that night.

=== Critical response ===
Tony Sokol of Den of Geek gave the episode 4 stars out of 5, calling it "surprisingly warm, and almost depressingly funny." He compared the episode to "Moaning Lisa," a season one episode also revolving around Lisa's sadness and musical interests. John Schwarz of the animation website Bubbleblabber gave the episode 5 out of 10. He found it off-putting that Lisa's hallucinations seemed to resemble serious mental illness, and disliked the new voice of Dr. Hibbert, Kevin Michael Richardson.

In 2022, Andrew Bloom of /Film listed Quilloughby as the 27th best one-off character on The Simpsons. He noted the "wispier and more fluid" gait that complimented the pretentious character, and praised the plot, the music and Cumberbatch's performance. Psy White of WhatCulture listed the episode as number 3 on a list of "10 Episodes Probably Made Out Of Spite"; commenting on the claim that Quilloughby is based on several people, she wrote "it's plain to see exactly whom the episode is mocking."

=== Reaction from Morrissey ===
The episode was criticized by Morrissey's manager, Peter Katsis. He called The Simpsons "hurtful and racist," referencing Hank Azaria's apology earlier in the week to people of Indian heritage for his longtime portrayal of Apu Nahasapeemapetilon. He was particularly upset by the depiction of the older Quilloughby as overweight and meat-eating, while the real Morrissey remains vegan. Morrissey himself wrote that the depiction was "taunting" a lawsuit, but he did not have the means to legally challenge it, adding "in a world obsessed with Hate Laws, there are none that protect me." Katsis believed that The Simpsons staff said that the character was based on several people, so that Morrissey could not sue. He also was critical of the character's voice actor, Benedict Cumberbatch; "Could he be that hard up for cash that he would agree to bad rap another artist that harshly?"

Some media pundits, such as Ed Power of The Daily Telegraph and Diamond Rodrigue of the Dallas Observer, believed that Morrissey was overreacting to the episode; the latter said that he should have been happy to be portrayed in popular culture again. Conversely, Armond White of the National Review called the episode a "character assassination" and said that it joined in with social media campaigns to "cancel" Morrissey. Writing in The Irish Times, Finn McRedmond found "pleasant symmetry" in how a series she considered to have passed its best was attacking a singer she thought of in the same way.
