= The Simpsons season 24 =

Season of television series

The Simpsons
- Season 24
- Digital purchase image featuring Grampa Abraham Simpson
- Showrunners: Matt Selman (3 episodes); Al Jean
- No. of episodes: 22

Release
- Original network: Fox
- Original release: September 30, 2012 – May 19, 2013

Season chronology
- ← Previous; Season 23 Next → Season 25

The twenty-fourth season of the American animated sitcom The Simpsons aired on Fox between September 30, 2012, and May 19, 2013. The season was produced by Gracie Films and 20th Century Fox Television. This was the first of two new seasons ordered by Fox. The primary showrunner for the season was Al Jean. It was the last season to air while 20th Century Fox was still part of News Corporation, as on June 28, 2013, various entertainment assets of News Corporation were spun off into a new company called 21st Century Fox, with News Corporation retaining its print assets and Australian media assets.

The season was nominated for two Emmy Awards, winning one, for two Writers Guild of America Awards, winning one, and for two Annie Awards.

== Voice cast & characters ==
=== Main cast ===
- Dan Castellaneta as Homer Simpson, Arnie Pye, Mayor Quimby, Kodos, Groundskeeper Willie, Santa's Little Helper, Sideshow Mel, Frankie the Squealer, Rich Texan, Snowball II, Barney Gumble, Squeaky-Voiced Teen, Grampa Simpson, Krusty the Clown, Louie, Sam, Hans Moleman, Grizzly Shawn, Gil Gunderson, C.H.U.M., Charlie and various others
- Julie Kavner as Marge Simpson, Patty Bouvier and Selma Bouvier
- Nancy Cartwright as Bart Simpson, Ralph Wiggum, Nelson Muntz, Kearney Zzyzwicz and various others
- Yeardley Smith as Lisa Simpson
- Hank Azaria as Chief Wiggum, Moe Szyslak, Cletus Spuckler, Professor Frink, Bumblebee Man, Comic Book Guy, Kirk Van Houten, Lou, Carl Carlson, Johnny Tightlips, Old Jewish Man, Luigi Risotto, Snake, Duffman, Superintendent Chalmers, Apu Nahasapeemapetilon, Coach Krupt, L.T. Smash, Disco Stu, Julio, Sea Captain, Wiseguy, The Parson and various others
- Harry Shearer as Kent Brockman, Ned Flanders, Reverend Lovejoy, Lenny Leonard, Principal Dondelinger, Otto Mann, Dr. Hibbert, Principal Skinner, Judge Snyder, Dewey Largo, Legs, Mr. Burns, God, Waylon Smithers, Herman Hermann, Rainier Wolfcastle, Nedward Flanders, Sr., Jasper Beardly and various others

=== Supporting cast ===
- Chris Edgerly as additional characters
- Pamela Hayden as Milhouse Van Houten, Jimbo Jones, Jitney Spuckler, Capri Flanders and various others
- Tress MacNeille as Crazy Cat Lady, Brandine Spuckler, Dubya Spuckler, Bernice Hibbert, Lunchlady Dora, Shauna Chalmers, Whitney Spuckler, Lindsay Naegle, Agnes Skinner, Dolph Shapiro, Manjula Nahasapeemapetilon, Evelyn Peters, Myra, Mrs. Muntz and various others
- Maggie Roswell as Helen Lovejoy and Luann Van Houten
- Russi Taylor as Sherri, Terri and Martin Prince

Guest stars for the season included Marcia Wallace, Zooey Deschanel, race car driver Jeff Gordon, composer Marvin Hamlish, Anika Noni Rose, Jennifer Tilly, Steve Carell, Fred Armisen, Carrie Brownstein, Patton Oswalt, Benedict Cumberbatch, Tina Fey, former United States Attorney General Janet Reno, Edward Norton, and Jane Krakowski.

== Episodes ==
No. overall	No. in season	Title	Directed by	Written by	Original release date	Prod. code	U.S. viewers (millions)
509	1	"Moonshine River"	Bob Anderson	Tim Long	September 30, 2012	PABF21	8.08
Bart discovers that, out of all the female interests he has had, the only one who continued to like him was Cletus Spuckler's daughter, who has run away. He learns that Mary went to New York City to be a writer for Saturday Night Live. The Simpson family goes to New York, where Bart and Mary are reunited. Cletus comes to bring Mary home, so Bart helps her escape. Meanwhile, Marge and Lisa explore the city and end up performing Shakespeare in Central Park. Going home, Cletus comforts Bart after letting her go. Guest star: Ken Burns, Zooey Deschanel, Sarah Michelle Gellar, Anne Hathaway, Maurice LaMarche, Don Pardo, Natalie Portman, Kevin Michael Richardson, Al Roker and Sarah Silverman
510	2	"Treehouse of Horror XXIII"	Steven Dean Moore	David Mandel & Brian Kelley	October 7, 2012	PABF17	6.57
A Halloween special: -An intro showing a botched Mayan sacrifice in the past causing the end of the world in 2012. -The Greatest Story Ever Holed: Professor Frink's Subatomic Supercollider releases a black hole that Lisa takes in as a pet – and the hole ends up sucking up all matter thanks to everyone using it as a waste disposal unit. -Unnormal Activity: In this parody of the Paranormal Activity movies, a collection of video clips shows demonic activity in the Simpsons' house late at night – which may have something to do with Marge's deal with the Devil she made years ago. -Bart & Homer's Excellent Adventure: In this light parody of the Back to the Future film franchise, Bart steals Professor Frink's time-traveling car and heads to 1974 so he can buy a Radioactive Man comic at cover price (25 cents instead of the present-day price of $200), but his visit into the past alters the future and leads Marge to marry her first prom date, Artie Ziff. Guest star: Jon Lovitz
511	3	"Adventures in Baby-Getting"	Rob Oliver	Bill Odenkirk	November 4, 2012	PABF18	5.54
A series of events involving a sinkhole and a new car purchase by the family leads Marge to a sudden realization that she wants to have another baby. Homer is reluctant and sterile. Marge learns he previously sold sperm to a fertility clinic, so they go there. She sees that Homer's sperm was used to produce many children, and is horrified by the results, so they stop their plan. Meanwhile, Bart and his friends spy on Lisa when she begins biking to points unknown on weekday afternoons. They learn that Lisa is learning to write in cursive, which is not taught in her regular school. Guest star: Jeff Gordon
512	4	"Gone Abie Gone"	Matthew Nastuk	Joel H. Cohen	November 11, 2012	PABF16	6.86
Homer gets a settlement for fast-food related injuries, and concerns over bad banks' behavior leads him to put the money into an online poker site, and Lisa ends up becoming a hard-core player to build her nest egg. However, she ends up losing all her money to Sideshow Bob, who is revealed to be Bart's online persona. Because they are underage, they are refunded only their original amount. Meanwhile, Grampa mysteriously disappears from the Springfield Retirement Castle, and leaves behind clues to parts of his life that the family never knew before, including his marriage to a black singer named Rita LaFleur. Homer learns that Grampa left her so that he could care for a young Homer at home. Guest star: Jennifer Tilly, Anika Noni Rose and Marvin Hamlisch
513	5	"Penny-Wiseguys"	Mark Kirkland	Michael Price	November 18, 2012	PABF19	5.06
Homer is shocked to discover that his bowling teammate Dan Gillick is an accountant for Fat Tony and his mob. With Fat Tony away on jury duty, Dan is left in charge. Homer fights Dan to prevent him from murdering people until Tony returns. Dan is fired and opens an ear-piercing store because he likes using the gun. Meanwhile, Lisa adds insects to her vegetarian diet after passing out during a saxophone solo from iron deficiency, but immediately quits when the bugs guilt her in her dreams. She releases them, but they cause havoc around town. Guest star: Steve Carell, Joe Mantegna and Alex Trebek
514	6	"A Tree Grows in Springfield"	Timothy Bailey	Stephanie Gillis	November 25, 2012	PABF22	7.46
Lisa wins a Mapple MyPad for Homer at a school raffle and Homer, who had been battling severe depression, becomes happy while using the MyPad, only to fall further into despair when he accidentally breaks the device. Flanders picks up Homer's spirits when he finds the word "Hope" written on The Simpsons' backyard tree in sap and everyone sees it as a miracle. Kent Brockman uses a thermal video to expose it as the work of somebody who wrote it. Homer is saddens, but it is revealed that a sleepwalking Homer who wrote it. A short story follows about the lives of the toys that exist in The Simpsons world in a city made of logos. Guest star: Kelsey Grammer
515	7	"The Day the Earth Stood Cool"	Matthew Faughnan	Matt Selman	December 9, 2012	PABF20	7.44
Homer wants a younger, hipper image, so he starts hanging out with Terrence and Emily, two hipsters from Portland. Homer and Lisa like them while Marge and Bart find the couple and their child to be irritating and pretentious. When the hipsters learn that Marge does not breast feed Maggie and when Homer learns they think he is a not genuine, the two families begin to feud. When the hipsters' compost pile starts a fire, the Simpsons use Maggie's baby formula to put it out. They forgive each other, but when Springfield is labelled cool, the hipsters immediately leave. Guest star: Fred Armisen, Carrie Brownstein, Patton Oswalt, and The Decemberists
516	8	"To Cur with Love"	Steven Dean Moore	Carolyn Omine	December 16, 2012	RABF01	3.77
When a fire at the retirement home forces Grampa to move home with the Simpsons, Homer throws out his back on moving day and decides to stay home to recover. While enjoying his time alone, Homer gets distracted by a tablet game called "VillageVille" and loses the family dog, Santa's Little Helper. Once they find him, Homer says he doesn't care about dogs. Grampa tells them the story of young Homer's dog Bongo. When it attacked Mr. Burns to defend Homer, Bongo is sent away to a farm while Grampa is forced to work for Burns. Grampa then shows Homer a photo of an older Bongo resting on young Homer's shirt, showing that Bongo remembers him.
517	9	"Homer Goes to Prep School"	Mark Kirkland	Brian Kelley	January 6, 2013	RABF02	8.97
After a lockdown at a kids' fun center, Homer is traumatized over seeing everyone panic in the chaos. He meets a doomsday prepper who introduces him to some Springfield residents who are preparing for the day when society crumbles from a disaster. When he neglects his job, the nuclear power plant causes an electromagnetic pulse and blacks out the town. Homer takes his family to the preppers' camp. They refuse to share their resources with the rest of the town, so Homer steals some. He brings the supplies into town but sees that the town has already recovered, which confuses the preppers. Guest star: Tom Waits
518	10	"A Test Before Trying"	Chris Clements	Joel H. Cohen	January 13, 2013	RABF03	5.04
Springfield Elementary School does badly on a state test and it looks like the school will be permanently shut down. Lisa learns that Bart did not take the test. He does not care until he has a nightmare where Springfield is declared the stupidest town in the country. He takes the test and barely passes, which saves the school. Meanwhile, Homer finds a discarded parking meter. He sets it up to trick people into paying, but Chief Wiggum catches him. As he flees, the meter is destroyed, and Marge forces him to return the money. Guest star: Valerie Harper Note: This episode was dedicated to Huell Howser.
519	11	"The Changing of the Guardian"	Bob Anderson	Rob LaZebnik	January 27, 2013	RABF04	5.23
After surviving a tornado landing in Springfield, Marge and Homer seek out guardians for the kids in case they end up getting killed. They first turn to friends and family, but on one wants the job. They find a childless couple, Mav and Portia, to agree but they want to care for the children on the weekends. Homer and Marge learn that they are trying to integrate them into their family. When Mav and Portia are confronted, they learn that the children prefer Homer and Marge. Guest star: Danny DeVito and Rashida Jones
520	12	"Love Is a Many-Splintered Thing"	Mike Frank Polcino	Tim Long	February 10, 2013	RABF07	4.19
Mary Spuckler has returned to Springfield and starts a relationship with Bart. However, he neglects her, and Mary ends things with him after a while. Homer and Marge argue and when Bart takes Homer's side, they are both kicked out of the house. Moving to an apartment, they realize that they must win back Marge and Mary. They sing a song to them, and Homer wins back Marge. Mary, however, has moved on with someone else. Later, Mary's social media status changes from "Married" to "Single," giving Bart hope. Guest star: Benedict Cumberbatch, Robert Caro, Zooey Deschanel and Max Weinberg
521	13	"Hardly Kirk-ing"	Matthew Nastuk	Tom Gammill & Max Pross	February 17, 2013	RABF05	4.57
Bart gives Milhouse a haircut to get the epoxy out of his hair, and Milhouse's new Kirk-mirroring appearance leads the kids to enjoy the adult life for a while. Lisa wants to go downtown, so Milhouse, Bart, and Lisa go together. They go to a condo presentation for a free breakfast, and the saleswoman flirts with Milhouse. Meanwhile, Marge tries to wean Maggie off a series of DVDs for toddlers that were pulled for stunting children's developmental growth, and Homer gets addicted to "find the hidden object" puzzle books. When they notice Bart and Lisa are missing, they use Homer's new skill to find them. Guest star: Kevin Michael Richardson
522	14	"Gorgeous Grampa"	Chuck Sheetz	Matt Selman	March 3, 2013	RABF06	4.66
Homer buys a storage locker after watching a reality show, only to discover that it is Grampa's. He suspects that his dad was secretly gay, but it turns out Grampa was a superstar pro wrestler named Glamorous Godfrey whom wrestling fans hated. Mr. Burns, who idolized him, convinces Grampa to start wrestling again. Bart joins Grampa in wrestling, worrying Homer and Marge. When he sees Bart taunting the crowd, Grampa adopts a new persona to stop Bart. Burns is enraged, but Grampa and Bart team up to defeat him in the ring.
523	15	"Black Eyed, Please"	Matthew Schofield	John Frink	March 10, 2013	RABF09	4.85
Flanders tries to atone for punching Homer in the eye after Flanders' parents take a liking to him instead of their own son. He asks Homer to punch him, but he refuses, saying that he is now better than Flanders. This prompts him to punch Homer's other eye. Meanwhile, a new substitute teacher named Miss Cantwell is hired while Miss Hoover is out with severe depression. Miss Cantwell likes everyone except Lisa. Homer says he will accept Ned's apology if Edna helps Lisa. She sends Bart to Miss Cantwell's class, and he films her making insulting remarks about Lisa. Apparently, Miss Cantwell thought Lisa was pretty and popular, so she gave her a hard time because she was jealous. Delighted, Lisa declines to correct her. Guest star: Richard Dawkins and Tina Fey
524	16	"Dark Knight Court"	Mark Kirkland	Billy Kimball & Ian Maxtone-Graham	March 17, 2013	RABF10	4.89
The Springfield Elementary School band marching in the Easter parade accidentally ruin the watchers' clothes. Bart is blamed, but he denies it. Lisa proposes holding a trial, but it does not go well. Meanwhile, Mr. Burns fulfills his dream of becoming a superhero, and Smithers pays the townspeople to be supervillains for Fruit Bat Man to defeat. Lisa hires Burns to help Bart. Lisa notices that Groundskeeper Willie's kilt is barely stained. He confesses to the prank but destroys the evidence. Burns captures Willie and turns him in before Bart is declared guilty. Guest star: Janet Reno; Note: This episode was dedicated to Robert Reno.
525	17	"What Animated Women Want"	Steven Dean Moore	J. Stewart Burns	April 14, 2013	RABF08	4.11
Homer and Marge are having a date at a restaurant, but Homer is only interested in the food. This angers Marge, and Homer fails to win her back. Moe suggests buying sex toys to seduce her. Marge is confused, and Homer injures himself with one of the toys. At the hospital, they reconcile when Marge realizes that Homer will always try to make things up with her. Meanwhile, Lisa becomes interested in Milhouse after he refuses to share his cupcake. Milhouse is not comfortable acting this way, but a school counselor says his normal personality is boring. Later, he apologizes to Lisa for his behavior, which makes him feel better. Guest star: Wanda Sykes and George Takei
526	18	"Pulpit Friction"	Chris Clements	Bill Odenkirk	April 28, 2013	RABF11	4.54
Reverend Lovejoy leaves his pulpit after a charismatic new minister usurps him. He makes Homer the deacon. Bart, missing his father, and Ned find Lovejoy working as a hot tub salesman, and he refuses to return. Bart induces a plague of frogs that the minister and Homer cannot contain. Lovejoy is able to stop it and takes back his position. Meanwhile, Marge's wedding dress has been switched with one of Krusty's costumes. Lisa and Marge track the dress to a couple who bought it to use as the bride's wedding dress. Guest star: Edward Norton
527	19	"Whiskey Business"	Matthew Nastuk	Valentina L. Garza	May 5, 2013	RABF13	4.43
Homer and Marge help a suicidal Moe get a new lease on life and Moe's homemade alcohol pings the radar of venture capitalists. They become Moe's business partners. Just before the company goes public on the stock exchange, Moe's suit is destroyed. Moe goes to the stock exchange in his normal clothes, which disgusts the traders, leaving the company worthless. Meanwhile, Grandpa gets hurt at home and finds Bart takes better care of him than the nursing home staff does. Grampa continues faking an injury, so Bart keeps caring for him until he finds out. Grampa apologizes and explains why he was faking it. In the meantime, Bart sends Lisa to a jazz club where a Bleeding Gums Murphy hologram performs. She is angered, but learns it is the next step in the entertainment industry, including commercials featuring deceased celebrities. Guest star: Tony Bennett, Kevin Michael Richardson, Sonny Rollins and Ron Taylor
528	20	"The Fabulous Faker Boy"	Bob Anderson	Brian McConnachie	May 12, 2013	RABF12	4.16
Bart's interest in piano lessons surges when he sees the instructor is a beautiful young woman. She agrees in exchange for Marge teaching her father how to drive. Bart quickly improves, so the instructor gains more students, causing her to neglect Bart. This causes Bart to confess that his improvement was a deception. This angers Marge, but the instructor's father tells her to forgive Bart, since he only got his driver's license by bribing Patty and Selma. Meanwhile, Homer loses the final two original hair on his head. He tries to hide it, but learns to be confident. When he shows Marge, she comforts him, causing the hair to grow back. Guest star: Justin Bieber, Bill Hader, Jane Krakowski and Patrick Stewart
529	21	"The Saga of Carl"	Chuck Sheetz	Eric Kaplan	May 19, 2013	RABF14	4.01
Homer, Lenny, Carl, and Moe team up to buy a winning lottery ticket. Carl goes to cash in the ticket but disappears. They learn that Carl fled to Iceland, the ancestral home of his adoptive parents. They track him down, and Carl explains that he used the money to buy a paper that clears his ancient family's name. Lenny is hurt that Carl did not tell them because he does not consider them friends. They translate the paper, which says that his ancestors were collaborators with the barbarians, not just cowards, which makes things worse. In a public square, Homer, Lenny, and Moe explain how Carl has been a good friend. The people are touched, and they forgive Carl's family. Carl accepts the group as his friends. Guest star: Sigur Rós
530	22	"Dangers on a Train"	Steven Dean Moore	Michael Price	May 19, 2013	RABF17	4.52
Marge stumbles upon a website for married women to arrange affairs and meets a man named Ben, who falls for Marge after the two bond over a Downton Abbey-esque period drama. Meanwhile, Homer takes home a steam train that used to belong to Springfield's high-end, outside mall and recruits his friends and Reverend Lovejoy to fix it for his wedding anniversary. On that day, Homer sends Marge away to set up the train at home. She returns home impressed, but Ben's wife Ramona arrives to confront Marge. Trusting Marge, Homer says that she does not need to explain anything about Ben because they are in a healthy relationship. Guest star: Lisa Lampanelli and Seth MacFarlane

== Production ==
In October 2011, 20th Century Fox Television announced that the current business model of The Simpsons could not continue and that it needed to reach a new financial agreement with the cast. A report described a previous deal that prevented the series from being syndicated on cable as long as the show continued and that the series may be worth more if it ended. A deal was reached with the cast after an intervention by executive producers Al Jean and James L. Brooks as well as creator Matt Groening. After the actors agreed to a 30% reduction in pay, the series was renewed for a twenty-fourth and twenty-fifth season.

Seven episodes were holdovers from the previous season. Al Jean continued his role as primary showrunner, a role he had since the thirteenth season. Executive producer Matt Selman was also the showrunner for several episodes, a role he performed starting the previous season. This season featured the only episode co-written by David Mandel and the only episode written by Brian McConnachie.

A contest was announced after the season premiere where viewers could submit ideas for a couch gag. Viewers would vote among the finalists, and the winner's idea would be shown in the season finale. The winner was announced to be Cheryl Brown's "Dandelions." A Canadian winner was also selected, whose couch gag aired exclusively in Canada.

== Advertising revenue ==
An October 2012 article in Advertising Age reported that the average cost of a 30-second advertising spot during a first-run episode of The Simpsons was $286,131—up from $254,260 in season 23. In 2012, The Simpsons was the sixth-most expensive television series in the United States to sponsor. The top five were (in ascending order) American Idol (Thursday), New Girl, Modern Family, American Idol (Wednesday), and NBC Sunday Night Football. A first-run, season 24 episode of The Simpsons was the Fox Broadcasting Company's fourth-most expensive program to sponsor, up from fifth in 2011.

== Reception ==
=== Ratings ===
For the 2012–2013 television season, the season earned a 2.9 rating in the 18-49 demographic, which was the 31st best performing show. It averaged 6.27 million viewers, which was the 70th best performing show.

=== Critical response ===
John Schwarz of Bubbleblabbler gave the season an 8.5 out of 10. He enjoyed most of the guest stars, highlighting Tom Waits and Patton Oswalt. He also praised the adaptation of the show to current trends at the time. However, he disliked the Mary Spuckler character and subplots that were not as interesting as the more creative main plots.

=== Awards and nominations ===
At the 65th Primetime Creative Arts Emmy Awards, animator Paul Wee won the Primetime Emmy Award for Outstanding Individual Achievement in Animation for "Treehouse of Horror XXIII." The same episode was nominated for the Outstanding Animated Program.

At the 66th Writers Guild of America Awards, writer Joel H. Cohen won the Writers Guild of America Award for Television: Animation for his script for "A Test Before Trying." Writers David Mandel & Brian Kelley and Tom Gammill and Max Pross were also nominated for Writers Guild of America Awards for episodes written this season.

At the 40th Annie Awards, writer Stephanie Gillis was nominated for an Annie Award for Outstanding Achievement for Writing in an Animated Television/Broadcast Production for writing "A Tree Grows in Springfield," and composer Alf Clausen was nominated for the Annie Award for Outstanding Achievement for Music in an Animated Television/Broadcast Production for "Treehouse of Horror XXIII."
