= Love Is a Many-Splintered Thing =

- The Simpsons episode
- Episode no.: Season 24; Episode 12
- Directed by: Mike Frank Polcino
- Written by: Tim Long
- Production code: RABF07
- Original air date: February 10, 2013

Guest appearances
- Robert A. Caro as himself; Benedict Cumberbatch as Prime Minister and Severus Snape; Zooey Deschanel as Mary Spuckler; Max Weinberg as himself

Episode features
- Chalkboard gag: "I was not nominated for "Best Spoken Swear Word""
- Couch gag: The Simpsons all look like Moe Szyslak (as seen in the couch gag for "She Used to Be My Girl") and announce that their new sitcom, The Szyslaks has been cancelled.

Episode chronology
← Previous "The Changing of the Guardian"	Next → "Hardly Kirk-ing"
- The Simpsons season 24

"Love Is a Many-Splintered Thing" is the twelfth episode of the twenty-fourth season of the American animated television series The Simpsons. The episode was directed by Mike Frank Polcino and written by Tim Long. It originally aired on the Fox network in the United States on February 10, 2013, as a Valentine's Day themed episode, the name being a take on Love Is a Many-Splendored Thing.

In this episode, Mary Spuckler returns and begins a relationship with Bart, but he begins to neglect her. Benedict Cumberbatch and Zooey Deschanel guest starred. Journalist Robert A. Caro and musician Max Weinberg appeared as themselves. The episode received negative reviews.

== Plot ==
Narrating the episode, Bart looks back upon his failures with girls, particularly Mary Spuckler. At Springfield Elementary School, Bart realizes that Mary has returned to Springfield and has been welcomed back to her family after the events of "Moonshine River." Though they pursue a relationship, Bart fails to pay enough attention to Mary and is instead focused on video games (and other things). Despite Lisa's warnings, Bart continues to take Mary for granted until she tells him that they should take a break. Bart recognizes the expression as a warning sign for a potential breakup. Additionally, she starts showing interest in a prosperous boy from Brazil. Eventually, it becomes clear to Bart that Mary has broken up with him after she sings a breakup song to him over the phone.

During an argument between Homer and Marge, Bart takes Homer's side, arguing that men cannot be expected to understand women when women never come out and say what they are thinking. In response, Marge tells Homer exactly what she thinks of him, leading to both Bart and Homer being kicked out of the house. The two promptly settle into Brokewood Apartments, an apartment for failed husbands who were kicked out by their wives. Bart and Homer initially become accustomed to their new situation, but the two, along with all of the other husbands, soon realize that they have to win their loves back, which they learn to do by watching British rom-com movies. Taking this into play, Bart, Homer, and the husbands invite Mary, Marge, and the other wives over to the apartment and sing to the tune of The Ode to Joy. It wins the hearts of every woman except for Mary, who has started dating the Brazilian boy. The episode ends with Lisa informing Bart that love is our only defense against the abyss, and afterward, Bart visits a social media site, where he sees Mary's relationship status change from "Married" to "Single," and he sends a message to her reading, "I miss you." In a post-credits scene, he receives a video call from Mary (newly widowed).

== Production ==
Executive producer Al Jean described the episode as a nod to the 1977 film Annie Hall with Bart reminiscing about his life.

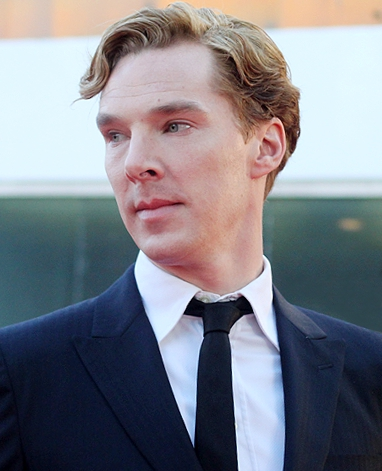
Benedict Cumberbatch guest-starred in this episode.

Benedict Cumberbatch was cast for his role after having a meeting at the same studio where The Simpsons record their voice-overs. After hearing that there was an uncast role, he commented: "I said, 'I hate to muscle in here, guys, but could I record it?' Next thing, I'm standing in a room with all those famous voices: Bart, Marge, Homer, Lisa." His two small roles in the episode were not Sherlock-related; instead, he portrayed the British Prime Minister and Severus Snape, in a spoof of Love Actually.

Zooey Deschanel reprised her role as Mary Spuckler after appearing in the season premiere. Musician Max Weinberg and writer Robert A. Caro appeared as themselves.

== Reception ==
=== Ratings ===
The episode received 2.0 in the 18-49 demographic and was watched by a total of 4.19 million people. This made it the second most watched show on Fox's Animation Domination line up that night after Family Guy, beating Bob's Burgers, American Dad!, and The Cleveland Show.

=== Critical reception ===
The episode was met with mostly negative reviews, with Robert David Sullivan of The A.V. Club giving it a D+, saying, "This is an unusually focused story for The Simpsons, but it's padded out by self-deprecating cameos and perfunctory, Family Guy-style celebrity impressions."

Teresa Lopez of TV Fanatic gave the episode 3.5 out of 5 stars. She liked the Annie Hall parody but thought the joke went too far. She also thought the Homer and Marge subplot was added in to fill time.

Rob H. Dawson of TV Equals said, "I just found 'Love is a Many Splintered Thing' to be completely boring and unsatisfying, is all."

== Cultural references ==
The episode makes many references to Woody Allen, whose character appears as an advisor to Bart, and Allen's film Annie Hall. The movie that Bart and his girlfriend go to see is La Règle du Jeu. A TARDIS from the popular British sci-fi show Doctor Who, which Matt Groening is a fan of, appears in the House of Commons, whereupon Alfred Hitchcock steps out and break-dances.

After the deaths of Alan Rickman and David Bowie in January 2016, a clip of the episode appeared as a tribute because the scene depicts Rickman's character Severus Snape while the song "All the Young Dudes," written by Bowie, plays in the background.
