= Mobile Homer =

- The Simpsons episode
- Homer being suffocated by the garage door while trying to clean out the Simpsons house's garage. This scene was inspired by a real-life event that happened to writer John Frink.
- Episode no.: Season 16; Episode 13
- Directed by: Raymond S. Persi
- Written by: Tim Long
- Production code: GABF07
- Original air date: March 20, 2005

Episode features
- Couch gag: The Simpsons sit down as normal. However, "Homer" reveals himself to be Sideshow Bob in disguise, who then brandishes a knife and chases after Bart, knocking over the television set in the process, as the rest of the family cower in fear.
- Commentary: Al Jean; Tim Long; Bill Odenkirk; Matt Selman; Raymond S. Persi; Tom Gammill; Max Pross; David Silverman

Episode chronology
← Previous "Goo Goo Gai Pan"	Next → "The Seven-Beer Snitch"
- The Simpsons season 16

"Mobile Homer" is the thirteenth episode of the sixteenth season of the American animated television series The Simpsons. It was first broadcast on the Fox network in the United States on March 20, 2005 to mixed reviews. The episode was written by Tim Long and the first to be directed by Raymond S. Persi.

In the episode, Marge, worried about Homer and his poor medical history following a near-fatal accident he has, saves money for life insurance. Outraged by his wife's excessive measures to cut back financially, Homer spitefully spends the savings on a motorhome, in which he spends most of his time, causing friction between the couple.

== Plot ==
Marge takes the children on a leisurely Sunday afternoon drive while Homer stays home to clean out the garage. A series of incidents results in him being suffocated by the garage door, but his life is saved when the family returns as Lisa and Bart apply first aid. Marge insists that Homer should apply for life insurance, but he is deemed uninsurable due to his poor medical history. After watching a melodramatic television film about the consequences of not having life insurance and apparently based on a true story, Marge fears for the family's financial well-being and begins purchasing cheaply low-quality products, keeping their savings in a large jar. Homer argues that as the family's breadwinner, he has the right to spend the money. Outraged by his wife's excessive measures, he secretly and spitefully uses it to purchase a motorhome, which he parks in the backyard and begins living in. Marge withdraws her word from him as she and Homer begin competing for Bart and Lisa's loyalty.

While refueling the motorhome, Homer meets a group of other motorhome owners and invites them to settle in his backyard. Their late-night merriment further aggravates Marge, who cuts off their electricity and causes Homer's newfound friends to ditch him. Bart and Lisa, bothered by their parents' escalating argument, decide to return the motorhome to the dealership themselves while their parents are distracted. As their argument concludes, Homer and Marge find out about their children's resolve via a note they left and give chase. Although their parents demonstrate that they have made up, Bart and Lisa are unable to reach the motorhome's brakes and it plunges off an incomplete runaway truck ramp and onto a Turkish cargo ship leaving the port. Marge persuades its captain to turn around by offering him several cans of cream of mushroom soup as the family stays on the ship for dinner. Homer's attempt to return the motorhome to land sends it sinking into the harbor, but Marge expresses a lack of tension over their financial loss due to the small amount of hashish laced in her food.

== Reception ==
=== Viewing figures ===
In its original broadcast, "Mobile Homer" was watched by 8.6 million viewers.

=== Critical response ===
Walter J. Keegan Jr. of TV Squad thought that the episode did not have enough laughs, but did have enough subtle Simpsons humor about SUVs, Turkish sailors and evil religious icons. He also thought that the idea of Marge filling the viewers in on what Homer does at work (since he is not seen there a lot anymore) was good, while his most puzzling moment was Bart's drawing of Homer.

Colin Jacobson of DVD Movie Guide called the episode "spotty" because while it "occasionally capitalizes on its potential", there were moments where it was "lackluster".

On Four Finger Discount, Guy Davis did not enjoy the episode, saying it was a combination of "half-baked" ideas and did not like the Homer and Marge conflict. However, Brendan Dando liked the episode because the creators were able to find a believable way for Homer and Marge to reconcile with each other by rescuing their children.

=== Themes and analysis ===
Wind Goodfriend wrote that Homer and Marge arguing over Homer sleeping in the mobile home is an example of "working through disagreements" where they will become more committed to the relationship when they are done fighting.
