= Lisa Goes Gaga =

- The Simpsons episode
- Episode no.: Season 23; Episode 22
- Directed by: Matthew Schofield
- Written by: Tim Long
- Production code: PABF14
- Original air date: May 20, 2012

Guest appearances
- Lady Gaga as herself; Kevin Michael Richardson as Lady Gaga Express Conductor

Episode features
- Couch gag: The family plays a Wii game in which they sit on the couch, but Homer keeps failing. Homer angrily throws his Wii Remote down and tries to sit on the real couch, but fails just like in the game.
- Commentary: Matt Groening: Yeardley Smith; Tim Long

Episode chronology
← Previous "Ned 'n' Edna's Blend Agenda"	Next → "Moonshine River"
- The Simpsons season 23

"Lisa Goes Gaga" is the twenty-second and final episode of the twenty-third season of the American animated television series The Simpsons. It originally aired on the Fox network in the United States on May 20, 2012. In this episode, American singer-songwriter Lady Gaga makes a visit to Springfield, where all of its residents are in a state of depression. Lisa Simpson is arguably the most depressed person in the city, prompting Gaga to go out of her way to teach Lisa the meaning of happiness.

The episode was written by Tim Long and directed by Matthew Schofield. Gaga guest-starred in the episode, portraying an animated version of herself. A fan of the show, she was brought on by showrunner Al Jean, who wrote a script after James L. Brooks saw an interview of her on 60 Minutes. The design team conceived eighteen outfits to complement Gaga's eccentric persona, satirizing several of her outfits including her meat dress. Recording sessions for "Lisa Goes Gaga" took place in Los Angeles, California over four days in August 2011.

The episode received initial mixed reviews from television critics who were divided on how well Gaga was utilized within the episode. Fan response was overwhelmingly negative. Retrospectively, "Lisa Goes Gaga" is seen as one of the series' worst episodes.

== Plot ==
Lady Gaga passes through Springfield via train while on her way to a concert. Seeing how low the city's self-esteem is, she takes it upon herself to cheer up the whole city. However, no one in town is more depressed than Lisa, who was voted as the most unpopular student by her peers. Lisa tries to reverse her status as one of the least popular girls in school by ghostwriting positive things about herself on the school blog using a sock puppet account named "Truth Teller".

When Bart finds out her secret and reveals it to the school, her social ranking plummets to a new low until a psychic force tells Lady Gaga that Lisa needs her help immediately. After much soul searching and yelling at Lady Gaga for trying to help, Lisa realizes that her outburst helped her because she is finally expressing her anger instead of bottling it up inside her, in effect making Lady Gaga's mission successful. Lisa catches Lady Gaga just before she leaves town to apologize, and after being forgiven she and Lady Gaga perform a duet together. With Lady Gaga's assistance, Lisa and the entire town of Springfield realize that being oneself is better than being like anyone else. Just as Lady Gaga's train begins to leave again, Moe runs up to her and asks if she can help him as well, but Lady Gaga declines, stating that she's not that good. As Moe turns and walks across the train track, a second train hits him.

== Production ==
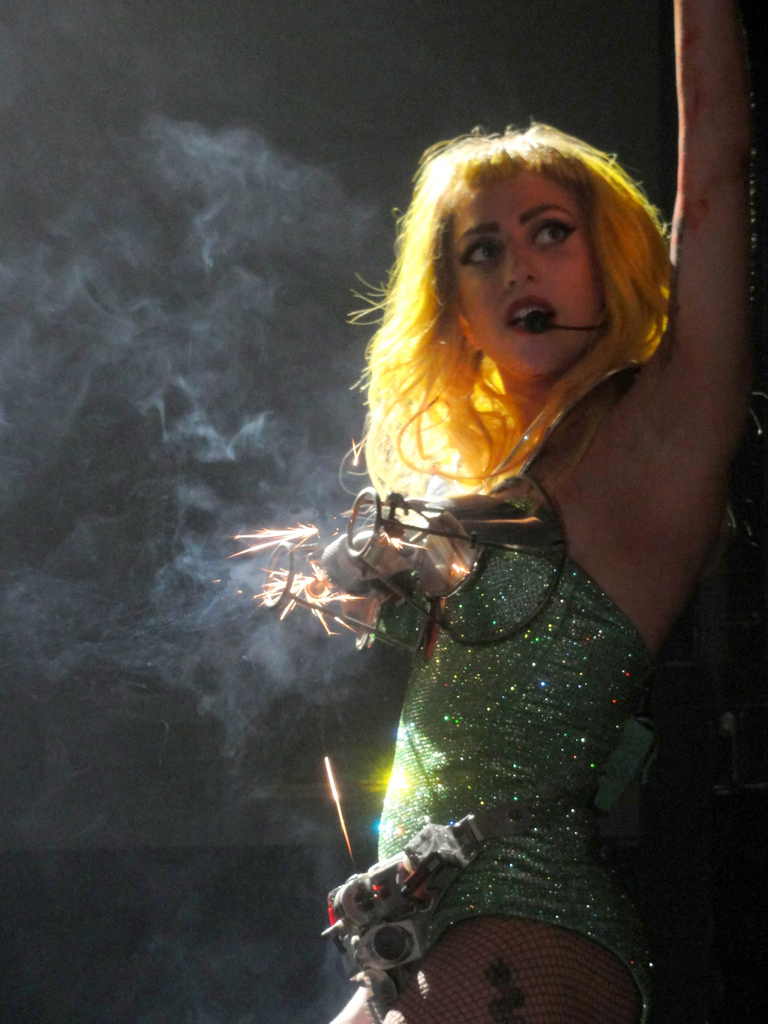
Gaga's Pyrotechnic Underwear was one of her outfits that was parodied in the episode.

In August 2011, it first was revealed that Lady Gaga would make a guest appearance on the show as herself. Producer James L. Brooks viewed Gaga's interview with Anderson Cooper on 60 Minutes, which prompted Al Jean to write a script and send her a letter of approval to appear on the show. "She was really excited about the whole thing," Jean recalled. "After she signed on to do it, she came in to record dialogue twice, and we showed her a rough cut the second time." Recording sessions for the episode took place in Los Angeles during a period of four days from August 22–26. Gaga was initially apprehensive while recording on set, which led her to review the satirical nature of the show to get a better understanding on how to perform. "Their characters are so awesomely convincing and sincere and wild and funny, I had to remind myself constantly of the sincerity of the humor," she explained. "That's what I was trying to focus on—not putting on a character too much, and really being as sincere as I could with the lines." Despite such emotions, Gaga professed that working with the staff of the show was "one of the coolest things that [she] has ever done".

Several employees of The Simpsons were impressed with Gaga's performance, who cited that her vocal range and ad-libbing skills were exceptional. Series creator Matt Groening stated: "Since the very beginning, I’ve always wanted to have on the most iconic personalities of our time, and she's it." In an interview with E! Online, Groening further commented on Gaga's appearance; "The great thing about having Lady Gaga is that she came in a number of times and always with a different getup. Like she'd leave the room and come back in after a break in a completely new getup. It was unbelievable. The only time that she ever took off her hat was when it was banging into the microphone." Cast member Yeardley Smith said that she was shocked that Gaga had the time to make an appearance on the series.

The design team for the series conceived eighteen outfits to complement Gaga's outré and eccentric reputation, although they did not collaborate with any of Gaga's stylists or creative director Nicola Formichetti. Due to the outfits' unconventional appearances, Jean was given more freedom to animate the large array of costumes, as these rapid changes "wouldn't be possible in real life". "There's a moment in the episode," Jean resumed, "when she starts out with her hair down. Then, there's a curtain pulled in front of her, and in seconds, she has a completely different outfit on with a cone bra and her hair is all hairsprayed up and big and frizzy. In real life, that would probably take 8 hours." Many of the costumes were inspired from previous outfits Gaga had worn, including her meat dress and her Kermit the Frog dress. "We did a lot of research, looking back at her old outfits, and she's really been in a million different things, had a million different looks."

== Cultural references ==
Many aspects of Gaga's career are referenced in the episode. "You're All My Little Monsters", a musical number specifically created for the episode, is a parody of Gaga's relationship with her devout "Little Monsters"—a phrase Gaga uses to refer to her fans. To Spin columnist Devon Maloney, the song was ultimately an overtly cartoonized version of her single "Born This Way" that embraces the "freakiness" of Springfield. Several of Gaga's outfits and looks emulate several iconic costumes the singer had previously worn, such as the "Living Dress" and pyrotechnic leotard she wore during her endeavors on The Monster Ball Tour, as well as her wardrobe at the 53rd Grammy Awards. One in particular, a dress consisting of pork chops, is a parody of the singer's meat dress, which she wore at the 2010 MTV Video Music Awards. During the end credits of the episode, Homer Simpson performs a parody of "Poker Face". At the end of the episode, a title card promotes the Maggie-starring short film The Longest Daycare (2012), which was shown before Ice Age: Continental Drift (2012).

== Reception ==
"Lisa Goes Gaga" was originally broadcast on May 20, 2012 in the United States, as part of the "Animation Domination" television line-up on Fox. Upon airing, it acquired 4.79 million viewers and a 2.1 rating in the 18–49 demographic, indicating that 2.1 percent of individuals between ages 18 and 49 who watched television viewed the episode. "Lisa Goes Gaga" faced fierce competition, airing simultaneously with 60 Minutes on CBS, America's Got Talent on NBC, and the 2012 Billboard Music Awards on ABC. Total viewership and ratings for the program evoked significant increases from the previous episode, "Ned 'n' Edna's Blend Agenda", which registered 4.07 million viewers and a 1.9 demo rating; at the time, the series' lowest-rated episode.

The episode produced varying responses from television commentators, and mostly negative reviews from viewers. "Lisa Goes Gaga" provoked The A.V. Club journalist Rowan Kaiser to conclude that the installment "wasn't that painful to actually watch"—albeit she found the concept and general execution to be irritating. In her B− review, Kaiser asserted that "Lisa Goes Gaga" used a straightforward interpretation of the singer, and felt that Lady Gaga's appearance was superior to previous guest appearances. "So many Simpsons celebrity voices," she stated, "show up for a few minutes at most, with Extras-style 'Wow, Chris Martin of Coldplay, what are you doing here?' Or they voice one-off characters without enough flair to be memorable. Instead, Gaga was the focus of the entire episode, to the point where if you wanted to call it a half-hour commercial for Lady Gaga, you probably wouldn't be wrong. Fortunately for 'Lisa Goes Gaga', the celebrity at its heart is entertaining enough that it being her commercial isn't a complete waste of time." A writer for HLN avouched that The Simpsons managed to culminate its season "with a lot of style"; David Greenwald of Billboard echoed similar sentiments. Gaga's performance was frequently mentioned in the critiques. Idolator's Becky Bain, Tracy Gilchrist of SheWired, and Caroline Westbrook of Metro issued favorable assessments of her acting: the latter affirmed that Gaga had many memorable moments throughout the episode.

And yet, as annoying as this episode was in concept and generally in execution, it wasn’t that painful to actually watch. Cartoon Lady Gaga’s costumes and theatricality were still entertaining. And even some of the Gaga-specific portions made me laugh, like Homer cooking Gaga’s meat dress and eating it, or Bart dressing Maggie up as “Baby Goo-goo.” Against my better judgment, I was moderately entertained.

— Rowan Kaiser, The A.V. Club

"The series did make good use of their guest star instead of reducing her role to a small cameo," opined TV Fanatic's Teresa L., who concluded: "The episode ended up turning into one long-running gag about Gaga's eccentricities and a rehashing of all her most 'shocking' moments." Jocelyn W. of TV Equals said, "Lady Gaga helped The Simpsons end its 23rd season on a memorable note."

"Lisa Goes Gaga" is often listed as one of the series' worst episodes.
