= Gorgeous Grampa =

- The Simpsons episode
- Episode no.: Season 24; Episode 14
- Directed by: Chuck Sheetz
- Written by: Matt Selman
- Production code: RABF06
- Original air date: March 3, 2013

Episode features
- Couch gag: The Simpson family and several secondary characters do the Homer Shake.

Episode chronology
← Previous "Hardly Kirk-ing"	Next → "Black Eyed, Please"
- The Simpsons season 24

"Gorgeous Grampa" is the fourteenth episode of the twenty-fourth season of the American animated television series The Simpsons, and the 522nd episode overall. The episode was directed by Chuck Sheetz and written by Matt Selman. It originally aired on the Fox network in the United States on March 3, 2013.

In this episode, Grampa reveals that he was a professional wrestler, and Mr. Burns wants him to return to the ring. The episode received mixed reviews.

== Plot ==
Homer becomes addicted to a reality TV show called Storage Battles (parody of Storage Wars) and decides to participate in a storage unit auction as a result. He wins the storage unit with $1000, outbidding several townspeople and elephant Stampy. The family goes through its contents to find it is full of women's clothes and muscleman magazines belonging to Grampa Simpson. Marge comes to the conclusion that Grampa is a closeted homosexual who was forced to be heterosexual through most of his life. Homer and Marge set Grampa up with Waylon Smithers, but the plan fails when Mr. Burns arrives and scares Smithers off. Marge then admits to Grampa that she thought he was homosexual, to which Grampa becomes enraged and Mr. Burns reveals that Grampa actually used to be an old-time Gorgeous George-type wrestler called "Glamorous Godfrey," whose radical fighting style was heavily despised by the wrestling fan community, forcing him to retire. Burns reveals himself to be Godfrey's biggest fan (and only living one); he then persuades Grampa to return to the wrestling scene, which Grampa does. Though he is again met with loathing, Grampa continues the act under Burns's manipulation.

Bart soon becomes fascinated with Grampa and starts mimicking the mannerisms Grampa uses in the ring. However, he also attracts hatred and it worries Homer and Marge, but pleases Grampa and Burns. Under Burns's supervision, Grampa and Bart partner up in a tag team wrestling match. Marge tries to appeal to Grampa, but he turns her efforts down. However, he changes his mind when he observes Bart harassing the audience and takes on another wrestling identity that he calls "Honest Abe" in order to convince Bart to stop his ways. When Burns protests against this, Grampa and Bart defeat him in the ring. Afterwards, the two retire from wrestling.

== Production ==
The couch gag features Homer singing "Harlem Shake" by Baauer with Maggie dancing followed by the rest of the townspeople in the style of the Harlem Shake meme. When asked in an interview about the show staying topical, writer and executive producer Matt Selman suggested that the show should not have followed the Harlem Shake meme craze. Executive producer Al Jean quipped that the couch gag ended the fad.

"High to be Loathed," the song Mr. Burns sings, was written by Selman and Allen Simpson. Jean stated that having songs in episodes was becoming more difficult because it used to be a novel idea, but other contemporary television series also produce original songs now. He also said that the writers enjoy having Burns sing because it is funny. In 2013, the show's writers named the song as their ninth favorite original song on the show.

== Reception ==
=== Critical reception ===
Robert David Sullivan of The A.V. Club gave the episode a B−, saying, "The season has already been heavy on nostalgia and on Grampa appearances, so it's not a pleasant surprise when the Simpsons stumble upon a storage unit with boxes of feather boas, wigs, and perfume sprayers in boxes marked 'Property of Abe Simpson'."

Teresa Lopez of TV Fanatic gave the episode 3 out of 5 stars. She was concerned that Grampa was starting to have too many former occupations but enjoyed the family thinking Grampa was gay. She also liked the commentary about reality television.

=== Ratings ===
The episode received a 2.2 in the 18-49 demographic and was watched by a total of 4.66 million viewers. This made it the most watched show on Fox's Animation Domination line up that night.
