= Dogtown (The Simpsons) =

- The Simpsons episode
- Episode no.: Season 28; Episode 22
- Directed by: Steven Dean Moore
- Written by: J. Stewart Burns
- Production code: WABF15
- Original air date: May 21, 2017

Guest appearance
- Michael York as Dr. Budgie

Episode features
- Chalkboard gag: "Thank you for 28 great years... Taylor Swift"
- Couch gag: Homer, Marge, Bart and Lisa climb a snowy mountaintop, with their couch and TV carried up by the Sherpas from "King of the Hill". They are frozen and shattered by Maggie with an icepick.

Episode chronology
← Previous "Moho House"	Next → "The Serfsons"
- The Simpsons season 28

"Dogtown" is the twenty-second and final episode of the twenty-eighth season of the American animated television series The Simpsons, and the 618th episode of the series overall. The episode was directed by Steven Dean Moore and written by J. Stewart Burns. It aired in the United States on Fox on May 21, 2017, and the United Kingdom on Sky 1 on May 28, 2017.

In this episode, dogs are ruled to have more rights than humans, which leads to the dogs taking over the town. Michael York guest starred as Dr. Budgie. The episode received mixed reviews.

This was the last episode of The Simpsons to be scored by composer Alf Clausen, who had scored the show since 1990 before being fired in August 2017.

== Plot ==
Homer is driving ineptly and recklessly when he drives into an alleyway, with no room to maneuver and faulty brakes, where Santa's Little Helper and the now-homeless Gil are eating out of trash cans. Homer is horrified by the notion of hitting a dog, so he slams into Gil instead, who ends up with a serious neck injury and plans to sue the Simpsons for everything they have. The next morning, Homer has a plan to convince Gil to not sue his family by visiting him at Springfield Hospital, but couldn't make him desist from suing them. Later that day, the jury accepts the defense argument that dogs are not only as good as humans, but better in many ways, and they dismiss Gil's case. Mayor Quimby decides to ride the pro-pooch sentiment by instituting measures that cater to canines and punish humans who do things like round up strays, and employees at veterinary offices. This includes Dr. Budgie, who gets arrested and put into shackles.

Dr. Budgie's plea for Springfield to realize that the dogs will soon notice that humans have abdicated their lead status and turn on the citizens is not taken seriously until it actually happens. Santa's Little Helper joins the feral dog pack too, as the town hides from the now-vicious dogs, and a town meeting leads to the community begging their most broken-down citizen to help them: Gil. Gil is ready to face down his fellow street creatures, but it is Marge who steps up, and after finding out the leader of the dog pack is a vicious chihuahua named Taquito, kicks Taquito clear out of their showdown park and becomes the new alpha of Springfield. All of the dogs return to their homes and families, from Ned's Baz and Mr. Burns' hounds, to Lisa and Bart's joyous reunion with Santa's Little Helper. In the final scene, Gil thinks he has found a new friend in a weakened Taquito who licks Gil and barks happily. Gil does not realize that Taquito is sure Gil will die soon and wants to get a taste so he'll be ready to eat his corpse when that happens.

== Production ==
There was originally going to be a scene in which Lisa meets Milhouse's pet dog, Taquito, a rabid chihuahua who tries to kill her. She tries to fend him off by speaking Spanish. The scene was ultimately deleted from the final episode.

The couch gag was released as a promo image for the Season 26 episode "The Kids Are All Fight", before appearing in this episode. The episode was originally going to use that couch gag, but according to Al Jean's twitter, it was too short, so The Game of Life couch gag from season 25's "Pay Pal" was reused.

== Reception ==
Dennis Perkins of The A.V. Club gave the episode a C+ stating, "As far as bare bones go, why not? Again, silly and high-concept can work if the jokes are good enough, especially if an episode manages to ground the silliness in some sort of character work. Failing that, a bold stab at self-reflexive meta-comedy can also power things along. But here, the jokes aren’t good enough to sustain the premise, the character elements are perfunctory and sparse, and, as has been the case for a few years in a row now, the season finale has seemed less like an attempt to go out with a bang, and more like an afterthought."

Tony Sokol of Den of Geek gave the episode 4/5 stars stating, "'Dogtown' panders to puppy love and yet somehow manages to mangle the mutts into a mangy mess of mischievous mayhem. Who doesn’t love cute puppies, playing piano, getting their snouts stuck in pickle jars or scratching their butts along the concrete to clean their fire hydrant debris? Cats will get their day, but doggies are adorable. They are instant memes, man’s best friend, blind people’s eyes and the saviors of drunken arctic explorers."

"Dogtown" scored a 0.9 rating with a 4 share and was watched by 2.15 million people, making The Simpsons the second most watched show on Fox that night.
