= To Cur with Love =

- The Simpsons episode
- Episode no.: Season 24; Episode 8
- Directed by: Steven Dean Moore
- Written by: Carolyn Omine
- Production code: RABF01
- Original air date: December 16, 2012

Episode chronology
← Previous "The Day the Earth Stood Cool"	Next → "Homer Goes to Prep School"
- The Simpsons season 24

"To Cur with Love" is the eighth episode of the twenty-fourth season of the American animated television series The Simpsons. The episode was directed by Steven Dean Moore and written by Carolyn Omine. It originally aired on the Fox network in the United States on December 16, 2012.

In this episode, Grampa tells the story of Homer's childhood dog, Bongo. The episode received mixed reviews.

== Plot ==
During an event in downtown Springfield, Professor Frink demonstrates a new invention that he soon loses control of, resulting in the destruction of the Springfield Retirement Castle. This results in Grampa moving in with the Simpsons. Meanwhile, Homer discovers an app game called "Villageville" on his MyPad, which involves constructing a village. His immediate addiction to it causes him to ignore Santa's Little Helper and lead to the dog's sudden disappearance. They eventually find Santa's Little Helper hidden in a pantry shelf below the sink. Lisa and Bart realize Homer doesn't pay attention to Santa's Little Helper, and Homer states that he does not get along with Santa's Little Helper because he is not a "dog person," Grampa mentions another dog named Bongo, which upsets Homer. It is revealed that Bongo was Homer's childhood dog and best friend through flashbacks while Harry Nilsson sings Me and My Arrow from the cartoon The Point, which the animation also imitates, with cross-hatch shading and a more angular style.

Grampa soon reveals that during a kid's fundraiser Mr. Burns was hosting, Burns insulted Homer and Bongo attacked him in retaliation. Hugely upset, Burns demands that Grandpa turn Bongo over to him so that he can have the dog killed. To save Bongo's life, Grandpa sent him to a farm upstate run by a woman named Ms. Viola, but Homer was devastated, leaving Grandpa to suffer both his son's anger and Burns' making him take on a terrible job and awful wardrobe as punishment for not sacrificing Bongo. Back in the present, Homer has still resented Grampa to this day, realizing he will never see Bongo or that Bongo will never remember his old friend. Grampa then shows Homer a picture of an older Bongo resting on an old sweatshirt Homer gave to Bongo when the dog was left to Ms. Viola, proving that Bongo still remembers him. Homer tries to deny the truth but eventually bursts into tears when he realizes that Grandpa did something noble and suffered badly for it, and he immediately makes amends with his father and spends the following night sleeping on the couch with him and Santa's Little Helper, dreaming about himself walking with Santa's Little Helper alongside a younger Homer with Bongo, Burns with his dogs, and Krusty with a gorilla that was the predecessor of Mr. Teeny.

At the end of the episode, Mr. Burns has a sad (for him) conversation with Smithers where they concede that Mitt Romney lost the 2012 Presidential election, and then explains the fiscal cliff in his own words.

== Production ==
The episode was paired with the short, Montgomery Burns Explains the "Fiscal Cliff" which aired as the tag scene for the episode before the closing credits. The scene was released twelve days earlier on YouTube to address the economic situation at the time.

== Cultural references ==
Homer plays the video game Villageville, which is a parody of the game FarmVille. "Me and My Arrow" by Harry Nilsson plays over the montage of Homer and Bongo bonding.

== Reception ==
=== Ratings ===
The episode was watched by a total of 3.77 million viewers, which was Fox's most watched show of the night. Fox repeated "To Cur with Love" in the 8:30 PM timeslot one week later. The repeat was watched by 4.89 million viewers with a 2.1 rating in the 18-49 demographic. This made it the 3rd most watched show in the Animation Domination line up that night.

=== Critical reception ===
Robert David Sullivan from The A.V. Club gave the episode a C, saying, "This is another trip to the past—without many period trappings to chuckle over—that feels like marking time."

Jasper Goodheart from ShowWatcher wrote "Not a hugely funny episode, but certainly a good one to watch if you want something your Family Guys and South Parks can’t do anywhere near as well as The Simpsons: Make you feel for these characters."

Teresa Lopez of TV Fanatic gave the episode 4 out of 5 stars. She enjoyed the story of Homer and Bongo and its use to tell origin stories for other characters. However, she dislikes the inconsistency of Grampa's status and his relationship with Homer.

Jen Johnson of Den of Geek liked the dog story, but would have preferred more of a Christmas theme.
