= Edwin E. Aguilar =

Salvadoran animator (1974–2021)

- Born: August 16, 1974; El Salvador
- Died: April 10, 2021 (aged 46); Los Angeles, California, U.S.
- Notable works: The Simpsons; The Simpsons Movie; Brickleberry; The Edge of Seventeen; Bongo Comics
- Spouse: Marike
- Children: 3 (Jonathon, Maya and Bodhi)

Edwin E. Aguilar (August 16, 1974 – April 10, 2021) was a Salvadoran-American animator and storyboard artist on The Simpsons from 1999 to 2021. He studied illustration at the ArtCenter College of Design in Pasadena and animation at the Bridges Visual Institute in Santa Monica. He worked in Graz Entertainment and Hanna-Barbera. Aguilar died of a stroke in April 2021. The final Simpsons episode that Aguilar assistant directed is "Burger Kings". The following episode, "Panic on the Streets of Springfield", was dedicated to him.
