= Black Eyed, Please =

- The Simpsons episode
- Episode no.: Season 24; Episode 15
- Directed by: Matthew Schofield
- Written by: John Frink
- Production code: RABF09
- Original air date: March 10, 2013

Guest appearances
- Richard Dawkins as Devil Version of Himself; Tina Fey as Ms. Cantwell

Episode features
- Chalkboard gag: I'm sorry I broke the blackboard" (written on a whiteboard in marker).
- Couch gag: In another Plympton-animated opening, Homer, Marge, Bart, and Lisa are in a 1930s gangster story, armed with weapons and ready to attack. When Maggie turns on the lights, everyone is in the present day, holding common objects. Maggie then fires off a Tommy gun as they sit on the couch to watch TV.

Episode chronology
← Previous "Gorgeous Grampa"	Next → "Dark Knight Court"
- The Simpsons season 24

"Black Eyed, Please" is the fifteenth episode of the twenty-fourth season of the American animated television series The Simpsons, and the 523rd episode overall. The episode was directed by Matthew Schofield and written by John Frink. It first aired on the Fox network in the United States on March 10, 2013. The name is a pun on black-eyed peas and the band of the same name.

In this episode, Flanders seeks forgiveness after punching Homer in the eye while a new substitute teacher likes everyone except Lisa. Tina Fey guest starred as Ms. Cantwell, and evolutionary biologist Richard Dawkins appeared as himself. The episode received mixed reviews.

The couch segment of this episode's intro was animated by Bill Plympton in a film noir style. He also animated one for 2012 and one for 2014.

== Plot ==
Homer invites himself to Ned Flanders's house for breakfast and finds Ned's beatnik parents there. Ned begins to feel uneasy when his parents begin to take a liking to Homer rather than him. After a morning jog, Ned comes home to find Homer and his parents smoking "medicinal" marijuana and watching TV. Ned becomes so enraged he punches Homer in the face, giving him a black eye. Homer is furious at Ned, who does not know what he has to do in order to be excused. Ned eventually finds a solution in the Bible ("an eye for an eye"), and encourages Homer to punch him in order to make them even. However, Homer refuses to punch him, citing that he is the better man by not punching Ned and brags about it, causing Ned to punch Homer's other uninjured eye.

Meanwhile, Lisa learns that Ms. Hoover has taken leave due to a bout of severe depression, and the class gets another teacher, Mrs. Cantwell. Cantwell takes a liking to everyone in the class except for Lisa, whom she bullies by giving her lower grades and taking the paper cutout joeys off the kangaroo-themed "good behavior" board. Homer and Marge try to get Principal Skinner to do something, but the bullying worsens and Lisa is sent to detention, where the bullies are shocked to learn that Cantwell as a teacher is such a bully to a student like Lisa.

Homer eventually finds a solution to Lisa's dilemma and Ned's own: he will accept Ned's apology if his wife Edna Krabappel gives advice on how to get rid of the bullying teacher. Edna says the only way is the "nuclear option" - which means putting Bart in Cantwell's class. When Cantwell leaves to go to the bathroom, Bart brings chaos to the classroom and then shows Cantwell a compromising video of herself in the bathroom cursing Lisa and tells her he posted it online. The plan works in getting Cantwell to leave, but it does not get Cantwell to be nice to Lisa. When Lisa tries to catch up to Cantwell before she drives off, Cantwell admits that she was only jealous because she believes Lisa is popular and pretty, and that girls like Lisa live a carefree life. Instead of informing her that she is also an unpopular bookworm, Lisa celebrates that someone thinks she is pretty— before Cantwell splatters mud on her as she drives off.

The story ends with Homer having a barbecue with Ned and his parents, and Ned's father revealing to Marge that he got Homer and Ned to be nice to each other by slipping marijuana in their food.

== Production ==
The couch gag, titled "Film Noir," was created by animator Bill Plympton. The homage to 1930s gangsters is the second couch gag drawn by Bill Plympton. Director Matthew Schofield was able is sit in on the scoring session with music editor Chris Ledesma for the episode.

Tina Fey was cast as Ms. Cantwell, Lisa's substitute teacher who does not like her. Evolutionary biologist Richard Dawkins appeared as himself. He recorded his lines at the studio in California with Dan Castellaneta and was not paid for his appearance.

== Reception ==
=== Critical reception ===
Robert David Sullivan of The A.V. Club gave the episode a C, saying that although the stories were "not bad," the script was filled out with "an unforgivable number of hacky jokes."

Teresa Lopez of TV Fanatic gave the episode 4 out of 5 stars. She liked the relationship between Homer and Flanders and the dream of Flanders' hell. She also enjoyed Lisa's subplot but was disappointed with the reason that the teacher disliked Lisa.

Rob H. Dawson of TV Equals praised the "long, absurd riff on sports announcers" and wished that its silly tone could have been present throughout the episode.

=== Ratings ===
The episode received a 2.2 in the 18-49 demographic and was watched by a total of 4.85 million viewers. This made it the second most-watched show on Fox's Animation Domination line up that night, beating American Dad!, The Cleveland Show and Bob's Burgers but losing out to Family Guy with 5.27 million.
