= A Test Before Trying =

- The Simpsons episode
- Episode no.: Season 24; Episode 10
- Directed by: Chris Clements
- Written by: Joel H. Cohen
- Production code: RABF03
- Original air date: January 13, 2013

Guest appearances
- Valerie Harper as the Department of Standardized Testing Proctor; Marcia Wallace as Edna Krabappel

Episode features
- Chalkboard gag: "I will obey Oscar Campaign Rules from now on"
- Couch gag: The couch sequence is a trailer for an action movie called The Couch.

Episode chronology
← Previous "Homer Goes to Prep School"	Next → "The Changing of the Guardian"
- The Simpsons season 24

"A Test Before Trying" is the tenth episode of the twenty-fourth season of the American animated television series The Simpsons, and the 518th episode overall. It first aired on the Fox network in the United States on January 13, 2013. The episode was directed by Chris Clements and written by Joel H. Cohen.

In this episode, Bart must pass a standardized test to keep the school open while Homer tricks people into paying for his fake parking meter. Valerie Harper guest starred as the Department of Standardized Testing Proctor. The episode received positive reviews. Writer Joel H. Cohen won the Writers Guild of America Award for Outstanding Writing in Animation at the 66th Writers Guild of America Awards for this episode.

The episode is dedicated to the memory of Huell Howser, who appeared in the episode "O Brother, Where Bart Thou?".

== Plot ==
A trio of proctors visit Springfield Elementary School, telling them that they must pass an upcoming standardized test or the school will shut down for having low scores. All of the students take the exam except for Bart, who spent all day playing with a beetle. They eventually fail, which causes the school to be shut down and the children to be sent to different schools. However, when Lisa learns that Bart did not take the exam, she urges him to take it, but he does not care. The following night, however, he changes his mind when he has a nightmare in which Springfield becomes the stupidest town in the country. Bart's test day arrives, but he is still not ready. As a result, he answers the first few questions with the same answer and does not fill in the last answer. However, the lead proctor mistakes the same beetle from earlier, who landed on one of the answer bubbles, for one of Bart's answers (In a conversation with Marge at the end of the episode, the lead proctor hints she has done so on purpose); she announces that he passed the test and the school reopens, despite a wrecking ball knocking into Skinner's office since Superintendent Chalmers assumed Bart would fail.

Meanwhile, Mr. Burns raises the price of electricity. As a result, Homer throws his domestic appliances in the dump, where he finds a parking meter that still functions. He decides to set it up at parking spaces around Springfield, moving to another as soon as someone pays. The scheme goes off without a hitch, until he finds out that Chief Wiggum is onto him. When Wiggum confronts him, he manages to escape in his car, but he accidentally crashes it when the parking meter lands on his groin and the meter flies out of the car and lands hard on the street, expiring soon after. When Marge discovers that he still has the money, she has Homer return the money to the community by throwing it down a wishing well.

== Production ==
Valerie Harper was cast as the proctor evaluating the Springfield school system. While recording for the episode, Harper reunited with her Rhoda co-star Julie Kavner who plays Marge.

The episode is dedicated in memory of television personality Huell Howser, who died 6 days earlier. Howser appeared in the twenty-first season episode "O Brother, Where Bart Thou?" Creator Matt Groening was a fan of Howser's show California's Gold, and the show also created a character named Howell Huser for the sixteenth season episode "There's Something About Marrying."

== Cultural references ==
"Halloween Theme – Main Title" by John Carpenter plays while the students take the test. "Changes" by David Bowie plays while Homer collects money with the parking meter.

In August 2022, it was reported that the episode had predicted the correct percentage of the rising energy costs in the United Kingdom when the Office for National Statistics estimated that gas prices would increase 17.1 percent. In this episode, Mr. Burns' hounds attack a man with a 17% sign on his back to select the amount that electricity rates would rise.

== Reception ==
=== Ratings ===
This episode received a 2.4 rating in the 18-49 demographic and was watched by a total of 5.04 million viewers, making it the 2nd most watched show of that night on Fox.

=== Critical reception ===
Robert David Sullivan of The A.V. Club gave the episode a B, saying, "If you're liberal, you can see the episode as a criticism of the 'test, test, test' strategy that is often offered as an alternative to better funding of public schools. If you're a conservative, you can laugh at the incompetence and jadedness of the public school administrators. Bart, no doubt, doesn't care what you do."

Teresa Lopez of TV Fanatic gave the episode 3.5 out of 5 stars. She liked the commentary on standardized testing and its pressure on students. She did not like the subplot with Homer and the parking meter.

=== Awards and nominations ===
Joel H. Cohen won the Writers Guild of America Award for Outstanding Writing in Animation at the 66th Writers Guild of America Awards for his script to this episode.
