= David After Dentist =

2009 viral video

DeVore Jr. screaming in "David After Dentist"

"David After Dentist" is a viral video of 7-year-old David DeVore Jr.'s reaction to anesthesia after he had been given oral surgery. It was published online by his father and, as of 2025, has been viewed over 143 million times on YouTube.

== Video origins and publication ==
In May 2008, 7-year-old David DeVore Jr. was taken to the dentist to have an extra tooth removed, due to a hereditary condition called hyperdontia. Because this was David's first surgery and his mother could not be there, his father decided to videotape the experience to share with her and their family.

After the surgery, David was feeling confused from the anesthesia he was given. While in the car, he was asking his father questions like "Is this real life?" and "Is this going to be forever?" and also telling him that he had two fingers. At one point, he attempted to push himself up from his seat while still buckled in and began screaming before sinking back in exhaustion.

Seven months later, David's father uploaded the video on Facebook. Being overwhelmed with people wanting to see the video, he decided to upload it to YouTube, but did not notice there was a private option. Just three days after the upload, it had been seen over three million times.

The DeVore family were soon made YouTube Partners. This gives YouTube the right to run ads over the videos they post, and in exchange, are given a share of the revenue. They also sell "David After Dentist" T-shirts and donate a portion of the revenue they earn to dental charities.

In May 2021, the DeVore family held an auction for a "David After Dentist" NFT, with the profits going toward David and his brother's college tuitions. The NFT sold for around $13,500.

== In the media ==
- The DeVore family appeared on The Today Show, The Tyra Banks Show, and The O'Reilly Factor to discuss the video.
- "David After Dentist" was referenced on My Name is Earl in May 2009.
- It was included in a question on the UK's The Big Fat Quiz of the Year 2009 for Channel Four.
- In January 2010, the DeVore family appeared on the season 2 premiere of Tosh.0.
- In The Cleveland Show episode "Brown History Month", the character Rallo says "What's happening? Is this real life? Is this gonna be forever?" referencing the video.
- The video is parodied in the Spanish TV series El Hormiguero, which aired on April 27, 2010.
- As part of a series parodying viral videos, Annoying Orange featured a parody of "David After Dentist" as its first parody, with its main difference being that Orange had his teeth whitened instead of having had a tooth removed.
- The video is referenced in an episode of Good Luck Charlie, when PJ, having been given anesthesia at the dentist's office, sits in the lobby acting loopy and saying, among other confused statements, "Is this real life?".
- A caricature of David appears in the Regular Show episode "Go Viral".
- During a skit "Dancing with Internet Stars", So Random! made a reference to "David After Dentist", with actor Doug Brochu in place of David.
- Comedic actor Brandon Hardesty created a parody where he played the part of David, but acted in a serious manner as though he were in a drama.
- In The Simpsons episode "A Tree Grows in Springfield", when Homer sees his broken Mypad, Homer says he wanted to "see the kid knocked up on dentist gas". The video plays for a second before the Mypad breaks.
- The video is mentioned in the New Girl episode "Naked", which aired November 2011. The character Winston is catching up on the two years of American history he missed while living in Latvia. It is the last video he has to watch along with the films The King's Speech, The Human Centipede, and Precious.
- The Homestar Runner cartoon "Strong Bad Classics!" ends with Strong Bad (who had just finished reading a story titled "The Ocelot and the Porridge Maiden") saying that he would change the text "baked ocelot" into "broached ocelot", only to have his brother Strong Sad object in a parody of "David After Dentist".

== Criticism ==
David DeVore Sr. has received criticism for exploiting his son. DeVore has stated that he appreciates the concern, but feels that it was innocent and has been a positive experience for his family.

== Medical explanation ==
In the video, David states that he sees four fingers when looking at his two pointer fingers. He later adds, "I don't see anything", after which he tells his father: "you have four eyes". David may have been experiencing blurred and double vision, which are common side-effects of dental anaesthesia. In medical literature, several ocular complications such as diplopia (blurred and double vision) and dizziness have been reported as a consequence of improperly administered local intraoral anaesthesia. It is estimated that ophthalmologic complications occur in approximately 1 in 1,000 local intraoral anesthetic injections; the majority of documented symptomatic responses arise within 5 minutes and may last for several minutes to hours.
