= Let's Go Fly a Coot =

- The Simpsons episode
- Episode no.: Season 26; Episode 20
- Directed by: Chris Clements
- Written by: Jeff Westbrook
- Production code: TABF13
- Original air date: May 3, 2015

Guest appearances
- Glenn Close as Mona Simpson; Carice van Houten as Annika Van Houten

Episode features
- Couch gag: Marge, Bart, Lisa and Maggie appear as penguins sitting on an ice molded couch, until they are eaten by walrus Homer.

Episode chronology
← Previous "The Kids Are All Fight"	Next → "Bull-E"
- The Simpsons season 26

"Let's Go Fly a Coot" is the twentieth episode of the twenty-sixth season of the American animated television series The Simpsons, and the 572nd overall episode of the series. The episode was directed by Chris Clements and written by Jeff Westbrook. It first aired on the Fox network in the United States on May 3, 2015. The episode's title is a parody of the song "Let's Go Fly a Kite".

In this episode, Homer gets into trouble when he complains about expensive birthday parties while Bart becomes attracted to Milhouse's cousin Annika. Glenn Close and Carice van Houten guest starred. The episode received negative reviews.

== Plot ==
The Simpsons are invited to Milhouse's birthday party, which is shown to be a big expensive party, so much that Kirk has to sell the house in order to pay for it. When Marge and Homer think that all birthdays are getting too expensive, Homer takes drastic measures by ruining other kids' big birthdays; however, the "Party Committee" discover Homer's deeds and threaten to put a black mark on the family, preventing Bart, Lisa and Maggie from ever having another birthday party. The committee offer Homer a chance to remove the black mark by ensuring that Rod has a magical birthday party, to which he grudgingly agrees. Holding the party at Springfield Air & Space Museum, the Simpsons are surprised when one of the veteran pilots being honored at a ceremony recognizes Grampa and tells them of Homer's dad's service with the pre-USAF air command services during World War II. The veterans are not happy that Homer and Grampa are estranged and actively intervene in the relationship, forcing Homer to hug Grampa at gunpoint.

Milhouse's Dutch cousin Annika shows up for a visit and Bart is attracted to her, even though she constantly complains about American culture and introduces Bart to goofy Dutch games and vaping, which he gets addicted to. Marge catches Bart and Annika vaping, but both Bart and Homer remind her it is legal in their state. When Bart learns that Annika is heading to the airport to fly home, Grampa reveals that he was in love with a waitress at the main diner near the base but was not brave enough to attract her attention, so he stopped his regular maintenance job and took a supersonic flight that nearly killed him but won over the waitress — who was Mona, Homer's mother.

Ending his story, Grampa urges Bart to be careful with making a grand gesture to win over a girl, as it may not last especially if he is pretending to be someone he is not. Bart desperately races to the airport so he can talk to Annika before she goes. Annika scoffs at his typical "American gesture" but Bart responds by telling her he actually does not like her because she does nothing but complain and is only nice to people when she wants something from them. He dumps the remaining e-cigarettes and walks away from her, leaving Annika feeling humiliated by being dumped by a friend of Milhouse's as she starts cursing in Dutch.

As the veterans leave Springfield, Homer and Grampa are on good terms again and Homer first grills, blends, and finally evaporates a big steak for Grampa.

== Production ==
In March 2015, Entertainment Weekly reported that Carice van Houten would guest star as Milhouse's Dutch cousin, Annika, who would spark Bart's romantic interest. The actress followed some of the show's writers on Twitter, and since they were Game of Thrones fans, they invited her to a table read. There, they joked that she could be Milhouse's cousin because they shared last names. Several months later, she was offered that role. The recording session took about one hour. Van Houten commented that the process was very efficient, and she was allowed to exaggerate her performance.

== Cultural references ==
The scene with the CEO of big birthday yelling at Homer is a parody of the scene in the 1976 film Network with Ned Beatty's character. Homer and Grampa watch the film The Exhaustibles 3: Arthritis Will Unite Us, a parody of The Expendables film series. Homer names Chappie and Mr. Burns, a Post-Electric Play as part of a list of dystopian future movies.

== Reception ==
The episode received a 1.3 rating and was watched by a total of 3.12 million people.

Dennis Perkins of The A.V. Club gave the episode a C−, saying "There are ghosts of any number of potentially fruitful stories all through ‘Let’s Go Fly A Coot’, none of which the writers (it’s credited to Jeff Westbrook) develop beyond their most basic, cursory outlines. Even if the episode were stacked floor-to-ceiling with great jokes and character moments, this would still be a rushed, frenetic 22 minutes. As it is, it’s as forgettable and poorly constructed as any Simpsons in the last few seasons."

Tony Sokol of Den of Geek gave the episode 2.5 out of 5 stars. He did not love the episode, saying it had a dull edge despite having fresh ideas.
