= The Changing of the Guardian =

- The Simpsons episode
- Episode no.: Season 24; Episode 11
- Directed by: Bob Anderson
- Written by: Rob LaZebnik
- Production code: RABF04
- Original air date: January 27, 2013

Guest appearances
- Danny DeVito as Herb Powell; Rashida Jones as Portia; Terry W. Greene as Man Baby

Episode features
- Couch gag: The couch is part of a dunk tank. After the Simpsons sit down, Nelson throws a ball at the target and the family falls into the water.

Episode chronology
← Previous "A Test Before Trying"	Next → "Love Is a Many-Splintered Thing"
- The Simpsons season 24

"The Changing of the Guardian" is the eleventh episode of the twenty-fourth season of the American animated television series The Simpsons, and the 519th episode overall. The episode was directed by Bob Anderson and written by Rob LaZebnik. It originally aired on the Fox network in the United States on January 27, 2013. The title "The Changing of the Guardian" is a pun on the term the changing of the guard.

In this episode, Homer and Marge find a couple to be their children's guardians in case of their deaths. Danny DeVito and Rashida Jones guest starred. The episode received negative reviews by critics.

== Plot ==
A storm passes over Springfield, and the Simpson family tries to pass it by playing a board game. Suddenly, Lisa spots a tornado that has touched down and sucks up Santa's Little Helper. Homer and Marge leave the children behind to find Santa's Little Helper and are aided by Lenny and Carl. They come across the tornado which nearly sucks everyone up and then traps Homer and Marge inside the intact building of a bank. The police eventually get them out, but Marge is traumatized by the situation. Realizing that the kids do not have proper guardians, she and Homer decide to find someone to pick as the kids' guardian. They try Grandpa, Patty and Selma, Homer's half-brother Herb Powell (who, for reasons unknown, is now poor again), Kirk and Luann Van Houten, and Cletus and Brandine Spuckler, but Homer and Marge reconsider all of them, and eventually rumors spread through Springfield that they are looking for guardians for their children, to which no one else in Springfield wants to take the job.

Homer and Marge decide to search the shoreline for any childless couples and eventually find Mav, a smooth-talking professional surfer. He and his wife Portia, an environmental lawyer, both win the hearts of Bart and Lisa, and the couple agrees to become their guardians under the agreement that they borrow the Simpson children for the weekend. Homer and Marge approve, but after a few weeks spent with each other, they find a family photo of Mav and Portia with their kids and realize that the two are planning to induct them into their family. Marge initially wonders if Mav and Portia are more suitable parents than Homer and she ever were, but Homer reassures her that Bart, Lisa, and Maggie are their children and they are their responsibilities. The two rush over to Mav and Portia's place. Mav and Portia refuse to give up the children, but end up deciding to let them go when the children say that they prefer their parents over them.

== Production ==
Danny DeVito, who provides the voice for Herb Powell, stated on Twitter in August 2012 that he was going to be recording dialogue for a new episode.

== Reception ==
=== Critical reception ===
The episode received mixed to negative reviews.

Robert David Sullivan of The A.V. Club giving the episode a C, commenting, "'Changing Of The Guardians' is three mini Simpsons episodes: a comic portrayal of a natural disaster, a well-worn sitcom story with cameos from lots of recurring characters, and a brief tale in which our favorite family is threatened by the Guest Voice Of The Week." He goes on to state that "everything is so rushed that none of this feels sad or tense or heartwarming or funny."

Teresa Lopez of TV Fanatic called this episode "the most disappointing I can recall" of the 24th season far. She found it "very difficult to stay tuned in for the whole episode - and that's pretty sad," explaining that "The dullness of the installment lies in the uninspired storytelling."

Rob H. Dawson of TV Equals gave the episode an equally negative review saying "The whole thing feels rushed and weird, as well as heavily front-loaded."

=== Ratings ===
The episode was watched by 5.23 million viewers and received a 2.3 rating in the 18-49 demographic. This made it the second most watched show on Fox's Animation Domination lineup that night.
