= Treehouse of Horror XXIII =

- The Simpsons episode
- Promotional image for the episode.
- Episode no.: Season 24; Episode 2
- Directed by: Steven Dean Moore
- Written by: David Mandel; Brian Kelley
- Production code: PABF17
- Original air date: October 7, 2012

Guest appearance
- Jon Lovitz as Artie Ziff

Episode chronology
← Previous "Moonshine River"	Next → "Adventures in Baby-Getting"
- The Simpsons season 24

"Treehouse of Horror XXIII" is the second episode of the twenty-fourth season of the American animated television series The Simpsons, the 23rd episode in the Treehouse of Horror series of Halloween specials, and the 510th episode of the series. The episode was directed by Steven Dean Moore and written by David Mandel and Brian Kelley. It first aired on the Fox network in the United States on October 7, 2012. In the United Kingdom and Ireland, the episode aired on Sky 1 on March 24, 2013, with 1,312,000 viewers, making it the most watched program that week.

In this three-part anthology episode, in the first installment a black hole appears in Springfield. In the second installment demonic activity occurs in the Simpsons' house. In the third installment Bart travels back in time, which interferes with Homer and Marge's past. Jon Lovitz guest stars as Artie Ziff. The episode received positive reviews. Animator Paul Wee won an Emmy Award for Individual Achievement in Animation for this episode, which also received an Emmy nomination for Outstanding Animated Program.

== Plot ==
=== Opening sequence ===
At the height of the Maya civilization, in the city of Chichen Itza, a sacrifice is about to take place to prevent the end of the world from happening at the end of the 13th Baktun and the Mayan Calendar. A Mayan Homer, who has been fattened up, showing that he is ready to be sacrificed, hears about it for the first time (as he did not pay attention during orientation) and attempts to back out to no avail. However, his wife, a Mayan Marge, tricks a priest, a Mayan Moe, into getting himself sacrificed instead by promising him sex. After the sacrifice, a Mayan Professor Frink confirms that the world will end after the 13th Baktun, which, accounting for the Gregorian calendar and the birth of Jesus, puts the end of days in the year 2012 (with the Mayan Mayor Quimby placing the blame on President Barack Obama).

In the present, Homer encounters three Mayan stone gods, mistaking them for the trick-or-treaters. One of them crushes Homer underfoot, then the second one jumps on Flanders' house. The stone trio start to wreak havoc on Springfield and the Earth with one stone god throwing fireballs at Springfield City Hall and throwing Lard Lad's donut at a UFO and then taking this to popular landmarks like moving the Eiffel Tower to crash it into Big Ben, ripping up the Great Wall of China; causing it to sink to a river of lava, making George Washington's head kiss Abraham Lincoln's head in Mount Rushmore; causing rivers of lava to appear, and splitting Earth into large fissures. Once their destruction is done, they high five to show their success on wreaking havoc in Earth, then fly off, only leaving the Earth to explode, replacing it with what appears to be the Earth's infrastructure or blood. The text reads the title of the episode.

=== The Greatest Story Ever Holed ===
The citizens of Springfield gather to witness the activation of the Springfield Particle Accelerator; they originally wanted to use the money to build a new baseball stadium, but Lisa convinced them otherwise. Professor Frink activates the machine and it works, but nothing exciting happens, and everyone blames Lisa for her suggestion. When everyone is gone, two particles collide with each other and create a small black hole which floats off. Lisa finds it, and after it sucks up Ralph and Nelson, she takes it home so that it will not cause any more trouble. The Simpsons put it in the basement and Lisa warns them not to throw anything in it or otherwise it will grow bigger. Despite the warning, Homer, Bart and Marge use it as a trash disposal, with Santa's Little Helper using it off-camera to get rid of Snowball II, and Homer even opens a business allowing people to throw their junk into it. The black hole becomes huge and consumes everything in sight. The only person who is not sucked in is Maggie, whose pacifier flies into the black hole, inexplicably stopping it. Meanwhile, all of Springfield has been warped to an alternate universe, where aliens worship their trash.

=== Un-normal Activity ===
In a Paranormal Activity homage, when strange events occur at the Simpson house, Homer sets up cameras to photograph what is haunting them. The culprit is revealed to be a Moe-like demon with whom Marge made a deal to save her sisters when they summoned the demon as part of a Satanic ritual. As part of the deal, the demon would return 30 years later to take Marge's favorite child as payment (which turns out to be Maggie, much to Lisa's shock). Homer manages to convince the demon to relinquish the bargain in return for Homer to reluctantly engage in three-way sex with him and another demon. After learning that the safe word is cinnamon, Homer throws his robe over the camera saying he'd like to try something and the Moe-like demon is heard yelling 'cinnamon'.

=== Bart and Homer's Excellent Adventure ===
In a parody of Back to the Future, Bart travels back to 1974 in Professor Frink's time machine to buy a comic book for 25 cents instead of the current $200 price at the Android's Dungeon. He then finds Homer in high school, just moments before he meets Marge for the first time (as seen in the season two episode "The Way We Was"). Before Bart returns to 2012, he selfishly tells Marge (who is already angry at teenage Homer for strangling Bart and constant demanding over her to be his prom date) to never marry Homer. When Bart returns to 2012, he finds that Artie Ziff is now his father and the family is rich and successful, to the point where Nelson Muntz is now hired as Bart's butler and personal punching bag. 1974 Homer, who stowed away in the trunk of the time machine, finds out about Marge and meets 2012 Homer, who wants Marge. The two summon every time incarnation of Homer (dubbed "The United Federation of Homers Throughout History") to beat up Artie. Though the Homers lose badly despite greatly outnumbering Artie, they wind up winning over Marge, who then takes pity on the beaten Homers and lets all of them live with her.

== Production ==
This is the first episode of The Simpsons co-written by David Mandel. Executive producer Al Jean stated that the first act about the black hole ties in with the discovery of the Higgs boson in the summer of 2012. A preview of this segment was shown at San Diego Comic-Con in 2012.

Jon Lovitz reprised his role as Artie Ziff in the Back to the Future parody.

== Reception ==
=== Ratings ===
The episode received a 3.1 in the 18-49 demographic, coming second in the Animation Domination lineup behind Family Guy, which had a 3.4. It earned a total viewership of 6.57 million, also coming in second behind Family Guy, which had 6.70 million viewers, but beating American Dad!, Bob's Burgers, and The Cleveland Show.

=== Critical reception ===
Robert David Sullivan of The A.V. Club gave the episode a B and gave a fairly positive review, commenting, "In the early years of The Simpsons, the annual 'Treehouse Of Horror' outing was a fun contrast to most of the show’s episodes. There was no warmth, no subtlety, no lessons learned, and no attempt at a coherent story—just a lot of gross-out humor and a chance to see Springfield stretched even further past reality. Now that entire show has adopted these qualities, the Halloween tradition doesn't seem as special. But, like the couch gag at the start of each episode, 'Treehouse Of Horror' tempts us with the chance to see something that doesn't feel borrowed (and a bit dumbed down) from the show’s glory years."

Teresa Lopez of TV Fanatic gave the episode 4 out of 5 stars. She liked the final two acts, especially the look at the Ziff family in the final act. She thought the first act was the weakest because of the humor coming from aliens worshiping garbage.

Screen Rant called it the best episode of the 24th season.

=== Awards and nominations ===
Animator Paul Wee won the Primetime Emmy Award for Outstanding Individual Achievement in Animation at the 65th Primetime Creative Arts Emmy Awards for this episode. The episode also was nominated for the Primetime Emmy Award for Outstanding Animated Program at the same award ceremony.

Writers David Mandel & Brian Kelley received a nomination for the Writers Guild of America Award for Outstanding Writing in Animation at the 65th Writers Guild of America Awards for their script to this episode.

Composer Alf Clausen was nominated for the Annie Award for Outstanding Achievement for Music in an Animated Television/Broadcast Production at the 40th Annie Awards for this episode.
