= Homer Goes to Prep School =

- The Simpsons episode
- Episode no.: Season 24; Episode 9
- Directed by: Mark Kirkland
- Written by: Brian Kelley
- Production code: RABF02
- Original air date: January 6, 2013

Guest appearances
- Maurice LaMarche as Tom Skerritt; Tom Waits as Lloyd

Episode features
- Chalkboard gag: "Teacher did not get fat during the holidays"
- Couch gag: The Simpsons are several awards (Homer is an Oscar, Marge is an Emmy, Lisa is a Grammy, Maggie is The Stanley Cup, and Bart is a Kids' Choice Award) who get crushed by the couch into a silver block that reads, "World's Greatest Grampa." Abe comes in and takes the cube.

Episode chronology
← Previous "To Cur with Love"	Next → "A Test Before Trying"
- The Simpsons season 24

"Homer Goes to Prep School" is the ninth episode of the twenty-fourth season of the American animated television series The Simpsons, and the 517th episode overall in the series. The episode was directed by Mark Kirkland and written by Brian Kelley. It originally aired on the Fox network in the United States on January 6, 2013.

In this episode, Homer learns to be a survivalist and takes his family to a survivalist camp when he inadvertently causes a blackout. Maurice LaMarche and Tom Waits guest starred. The episode received mixed reviews.

== Plot ==
Homer and Marge take the kids to a kids' fun center, which disappoints Homer as he has to watch the kids. Some kids end up in a secret room where they are dressed in black suits and white shirts and told, "Welcome to the Mormon Church, America's most respectable cult." However, upon seeing that the other dads have abandoned their duties, he does so as well. When a child leaves the building, it triggers an automatic alarm that shuts down the entire facility. Marge and the mothers pass the time by telling each other stories of childbirth, but the fathers instantly turn on each other and fight savagely. Homer is traumatized, and on a routine trip to Moe's Tavern, he admits his doubt of civilization's ability to survive a worldwide catastrophe and meets a man named Lloyd (guest voice Tom Waits), who reveals himself to be a survivalist "prepper." Lloyd introduces him to the world of survivalists, and Homer quickly adopts their ideals and methods, storing necessary equipment in the family basement.

Studying how to become a survivalist, he neglects his job at the Springfield Nuclear Power Plant, and as a result, an electromagnetic pulse blacks out all of the power in Springfield. When Mayor Quimby cannot find a solution to the problem, Homer is prompted to take his family to a base camp his fellow survivalists, who include Herman Hermann and Superintendent Chalmers, have set up. However, after an argument with Marge over their new lives, Homer begins to doubt the other survivalists when they refuse to share their stored equipment to the others in Springfield. Realizing that everyone else needs the equipment, he steals it all that night and flees back to Springfield with the family. The survivalists quickly catch on and gain pursuit. The Simpsons manage to make it back to Springfield, only to find that the townspeople have quickly gotten over the EMP burst and recovered as a society, much to Lloyd's dismay. Lisa tells everyone that a big lesson has been learned from all of this; meanwhile, a meteor carrying a horde of zombies approaches the Earth.

== Production ==
To create the episode, executive producer Al Jean stated that research was done on the prepper phenomenon, including how some people believe an electromagnetic pulse event would require people to live off the grid.

In August 2012, TVLine reported that musician Tom Waits had been cast as a survivalist who introduces Homer to a prepper community.

The episode aired three minutes late due to NFL overrun.

== Cultural references ==
In 2022, the episode became part of a QAnon conspiracy after German lawmaker Friedrich Merz misspoke September 24 instead of February 24 as the date of the Russian invasion of Ukraine. Because the numerical equivalent of the date matches the season and episode number of this episode and because the episode's subject refers to preppers and an electromagnetic pulse, conspiracy theorists believed that an event on that date would create "10 days of darkness" and return Donald Trump to the presidency of the United States.

== Reception ==
=== Ratings ===
The episode got a 4.2 rating in the 18-49 demographic and was watched by a total of 8.97 million viewers making it the most watched show on Animation Domination that night.

=== Critical reception ===
The episode received mixed reviews, with praise going to the humor and the criticism directed at the plot.

Robert David Sullivan of The A.V. Club gave the episode a C, calling it a "rather lifeless episode."

Teresa Lopez from TV Fanatic said "There quite a few amusing The Simpsons quotes to go along with the great sight gags and parodies of survivalist videos, but there wasn't much else new or exciting about the episode. Being topical can only make a show somewhat entertaining, so this episode only managed to be a little above average."

Jen Johnson of Den of Geek stated that the show was staying contemporary by mocking people's dependence on electronics and overreactions to disasters.
