= Gone Abie Gone =

- The Simpsons episode
- Episode no.: Season 24; Episode 4
- Directed by: Matthew Nastuk
- Written by: Joel H. Cohen
- Production code: PABF16
- Original air date: November 11, 2012

Guest appearances
- Marvin Hamlisch as himself; Anika Noni Rose as Rita LaFleur; Jennifer Tilly as herself

Episode features
- Chalkboard gag: "I will not concede the election till Karl Rove gives me permission"
- Couch gag: In a parody of Wacky Races, the family races against many characters, but all of them crash near the finish line and Grampa wins.

Episode chronology
← Previous "Adventures in Baby-Getting"	Next → "Penny-Wiseguys"
- The Simpsons season 24

"Gone Abie Gone" is the fourth episode of the twenty-fourth season of the American animated television series The Simpsons and the 512th episode overall. The episode was directed by Matthew Nastuk and written by Joel H. Cohen. It first aired on the Fox network in the United States on November 11, 2012.

In this episode, Lisa gambles with her college fund while Homer and Marge investigate when Grampa disappears. Composer Marvin Hamlisch, Anika Noni Rose and Jennifer Tilly guest starred. The episode received mixed reviews.

== Plot ==
Homer receives a large sum of money when Squeaky Voiced Teen accidentally throws hot onion rings on him in the Gulp N’ Blow drive-thru. Homer uses the money as a college fund for Lisa and plans to put it in a bank, but Lenny and Carl convince him that banks are not safe.

Following this warning, he instead puts the fund on an online poker site, which horrifies Lisa. Eventually, however, Lisa finds enjoyment in gambling her college fund to other citizens in Springfield, increasing the amount of money with every win. The gambling soon takes its toll on Lisa. During one game, she relentlessly decides to bet all of her money, but is mortified when one of the other players, revealed to be Sideshow Bob, wins the game instead, therefore winning her entire college fund. Saddened, Lisa quits gambling. Bart then approaches her, admits that he was using Sideshow Bob's image whenever he gambles online. Unfortunately, the poker site somehow found out Bart and Lisa were underage and they are now back with the original $5,000. When asked why he did it, Bart admits that he actually loves Lisa and felt sorry for her, then demands her to not tell anyone about this exchange.

Meanwhile, Homer and Marge arrive at Springfield Retirement Castle to visit Grampa. There, the staff inform them that Grampa had been missing for a while. Searching his room for clues, they find a photo of Spiro's, a restaurant where Grampa was revealed to work at. Homer is puzzled by this as he does not remember Grampa having a job there. The two go to Spiro's and talk to the manager, who points them to the direction of Rita LaFleur, a singer who worked alongside Grampa. Homer and Marge go to Rita, who tells them that she was married to Grampa and that Homer even knew this during his childhood. The relationship ended, however, when Homer was badly injured in a car accident and Grampa stayed behind to take care of him instead of accompanying Rita to Europe for a music tour the two had been planning together. Shocked by the revelation, Homer feels a new respect for his father because of the sacrifices he made for the sake of him. He and Marge then go to a winery where Grampa frequented and find him working there. Grampa refuses to go back to the retirement home, but changes his mind when Homer promises that the family will visit him more frequently. Unexpectedly, Rita pays Grampa a visit by playing his old song on the piano and he joins her.

== Production ==
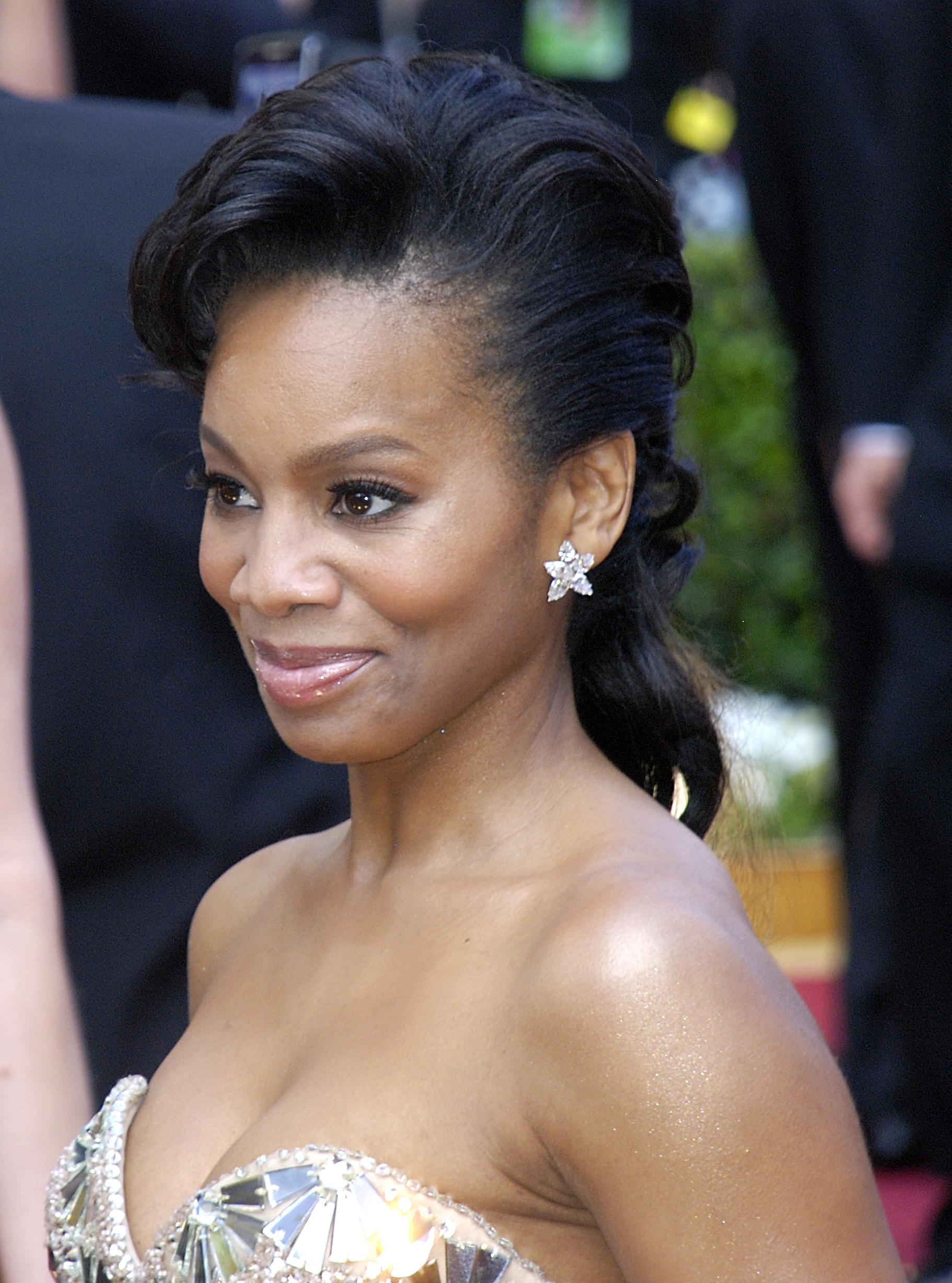
Anika Noni Rose guest starred as Grampa's former wife in the episode.

In March 2012, Entertainment Weekly reported that Jennifer Tilly, former wife of co-developer Sam Simon, was cast as herself appearing in a poker instructional DVD. Composer Marvin Hamlisch made a posthumous appearance as himself after he died in August 2012. When asked if producers considered cutting his lines due to his death, executive producer Al Jean stated that since Hamlisch wanted to do the part, they would honor his intentions. Anika Noni Rose guest starred as a former wife of Grampa Simpson. Rose was a fan of The Simpsons before guest starring in the role.

== Cultural references ==
The couch gag is a parody of the Wacky Races media franchise. Chucky from the Child's Play franchise appears with Jennifer Tilly on the DVD.

== Reception ==
=== Ratings ===
The Simpsons earned a 3.2 in the 18-49 demographic. It was watched by a total of 6.86 million viewers. This made it the most watched show of the night on Fox and the most watched in the 18-49 demographic. It was up from the 2.6 rating from the previous week. The episode was repeated on December 30 and was watched by a total of 6.69 million viewers and winning the Animation Domination line up that night.

=== Critical reception ===
Robert David Sullivan of The A.V. Club gave the episode a C+, commenting that the Homer-Grampa subplot was "another thin story with little satiric spark, and we don’t even get much of Grampa Simpson in cranky-old-man insanity" and the Lisa subplot as "especially inconsequential."

Teresa Lopez of TV Fanatic gave the episode 4.5 out of 5 stars. She enjoyed the more active Grampa in the episode. She also highlight the fact that Bart was playing poker as Sideshow Bob.
