= Moho House =

- The Simpsons episode
- Episode no.: Season 28; Episode 21
- Directed by: Matthew Nastuk
- Written by: Jeff Martin
- Production code: WABF14
- Original air date: May 7, 2017

Guest appearances
- Valerie Harper as Mrs. Butterworth; Michael York as Nigel

Episode features
- Couch gag: The Simpson family's heads are shown as Chia Pets.

Episode chronology
| ← Previous "Looking for Mr. Goodbart" | Next → "Dogtown" |
- The Simpsons season 28

"Moho House" is the twenty-first and penultimate episode of the twenty-eighth season of the American animated television series The Simpsons, and the 617th episode of the series overall. The episode was directed by Matthew Nastuk and written by Jeff Martin. It aired in the United States on Fox on May 7, 2017 and the United Kingdom on Sky 1 on May 21, 2017. The episode's name is in reference to British members club Soho House.

In this episode, Mr. Burns' friend Nigel makes a wager that he can break up Homer and Marge. Valerie Harper and Michael York guest starred. The episode received positive reviews.

== Plot ==
Homer drunkenly comes home for Sunday dinner, but Marge is too tired to reprimand him. At the power plant, while Homer, Lenny, and Carl discuss Marge’s reaction, Mr. Burns introduces them to Nigel and his wife. Marge visits Homer to say their marriage is in trouble, and Homer vows to do better. Watching Homer and Marge, Nigel bets Burns five million pounds that he can destroy their marriage, and Burns accepts. After work, Nigel invites Homer for a drink and implies that Burns will be mad if he declines. Homer texts Marge with emojis, which she does not understand, and she becomes angry when he is late. At Moe's Tavern, Nigel tempts Homer to see other women, but he declines. Nigel learns that Moe is attracted to Marge. Homer comes home, but Marge is disappointed.

In the morning, Marge tells Homer to go to a ballgame with Ned. On his way home, Homer notices Moe's is closed. Moe arrives and tells him that he has financial backing to run a new club called MoHo House. Homer and Marge arrive for the grand opening. Nigel raises the stakes, betting his entire fortune against the rights to Smithers, and Burns accepts. Moe charms Marge and dances with her, while Smithers gives Homer a gift to give to Marge to prevent Nigel from winning the bet. Moe runs away when it seems like Marge might be interested in him. Marge wonders why Moe can change but not Homer. A bartender tells her that it is because he is satisfied with the relationship, but she should be worried if he changes because it implies that he is cheating on her. When Homer arrives with the gift, Marge runs away crying.

Later, Moe texts Marge to meet him at the club. Moe invites Homer as well. Moe warns Homer that he will lose Marge if he does not start treating her well. Homer shows Marge a flip book animation he drew of him and Marge and apologizes to her, and she forgives him. Nigel gives Burns a check for winning the bet, but Smithers, seeking revenge, lies that Nigel is a figment of his imagination and that the check is a coupon, leading Burns to tear up the check. To thank him, Nigel kisses Smithers on the lips. Moe returns to his old bar while Burns agrees to a new fairer employee contract with Smithers.

== Cultural references ==
Homer's animation ends with a Gracie Films logo. A photo of Moe from 1921 appears near the end of the episode, which is a reference to the film The Shining.

== Reception ==
=== Viewing figures ===
"Moho House" scored a 1.0 rating with a 4 share and was watched by 2.34 million people, making it Fox's highest rated show of the night.

=== Critical response ===
Dennis Perkins of The A.V. Club gave the episode a B+, stating "Luckily, 'Moho House,' the name of the upscale high-rise bar an eccentric billionaire chum of Burns’ buys for Moe as part of a bet to break up Marge and Homer—well, you can see that plot kicking in right there. But seriously, credited writer Jeff Martin knows this world like the back of his five-fingered hand, having penned some genuine classics in his day. True, his one foray back into the showafter a few decades’ absence didn’t quite reach those heights, but it came close, rooting a Marge-Lisa story in some pretty deep character stuff. Here, it’s the same story (if a different plot), with the storied Homer-Marge dynamic actually feeling like it has some stakes."

Tony Sokol of Den of Geek gave the episode 4/5 stars, stating "Tonight is a tour de force for Moe, though. Between the vaguely British knockoff he touts his upcoming conquest to Sideshow Mel to the way he breaks into a grittily hysterical realism on the line 'yeah, well Midge, I don’t know what my deal is with that,' he uses all his voices tonight...Also, that line, and the delivery, humanizes Moe more than his standing down and telling Homer what’s what. He’s got a problem, just with remembering her name."
