= Penny-Wiseguys =

- The Simpsons episode
- Episode no.: Season 24; Episode 5
- Directed by: Mark Kirkland
- Written by: Michael Price
- Production code: PABF19
- Original air date: November 18, 2012

Guest appearances
- Steve Carell as Dan Gillick; Joe Mantegna as Fat Tony; Alex Trebek as himself; Terry W. Greene as Giant Ant

Episode features
- Chalkboard gag: "I want to secede but don't know what state I'm in"
- Couch gag: A tattoo machine draws the family and couch on a patch of skin, revealed as Marge's lower back; she quickly puts her dress on to cover it.

Episode chronology
← Previous "Gone Abie Gone"	Next → "A Tree Grows in Springfield"
- The Simpsons season 24

"Penny-Wiseguys" is the fifth episode of the twenty-fourth season of the American animated television series, The Simpsons and the 513th episode overall. The episode was directed by Mark Kirkland and written by Michael Price. It originally aired on the Fox network in the United States on November 18, 2012, and was seen by around 5.06 million people during this broadcast.

In this episode, Homer tries to stop his bowling teammate when he needs to murder people while Lisa adds insects to her diet. Steve Carell and Alex Trebek guest starred. The episode received mixed reviews.

== Plot ==
Homer is shocked to discover that his neighbor and bowling teammate Dan Gillick is an accountant for Fat Tony and his mob. When the government finally catches up with Fat Tony and issues him a jury duty summons, he names Dan as his temporary replacement. Dan gradually becomes power-hungry from the position, and is frightened by his own change. When Fat Tony orders him to carry out a murder, he begs Homer to do anything to stop him, so Homer ties Dan to a chair in the basement.

Meanwhile, Lisa passes out during a school band concert and is diagnosed with iron deficiency by Dr. Hibbert, who partially implicates Lisa's vegetarianism as a factor (despite her resistance) and prescribes her iron supplements. Unfortunately Lisa finds the supplements unappealing and impossible to keep down; seeing her plight, Lunch-Lady Doris (a fellow vegetarian) convinces Lisa to incorporate insects into her diet as an alternative source of iron and introduces her to the Springfield Insectivorian Society for people with similar tastes. Although she enjoys the addition to her diet at first, the insects start to taunt her in her dreams. After discovering that eating insects is getting her close to eating meat again, she decides to release the grasshoppers she has been raising into the wild, but Bart accidentally breaks the aquarium holding them and they escape into the basement instead.

The grasshoppers later swarm over Dan, tied up in the basement, and his screams prompt Homer to cut him loose, allowing Dan to flee. After Dan escapes, he starts hunting down Fat Tony's associates, only to be inadvertently thwarted by Homer before he can kill any of them. Once the trial ends and Fat Tony is released from jury duty, he regains control of the mob. As Homer and Dan struggle over Dan's gun, it shoots a bullet into the Kwik-E-Mart, wounding Snake Jailbird, who had just been acquitted in same the trial in which Fat Tony served, as he tries to rob it. Later, Lisa releases the grasshoppers alongside a country road, where they immediately eat a nearby corn maze down to the ground.

In the end, Dan is fired from the mob, and he opens an ear-piercing stand in the Springfield Mall, which he enjoys because he gets to use an ear-piercing gun.

== Production ==
In December 2011, Entertainment Weekly reported that Steve Carell would guest star as Dan Gillick, Fat Tony's accountant who is put in charge while Fat Tony serves jury duty. Executive producer Al Jean described the character as nervous because he wants to kill people, so he turns to Homer for advice. The part was written specifically for Carell, and he recorded his lines with Dan Castellaneta and Hank Azaria.

== Reception ==
=== Ratings ===
The episode came second in the night in both the 18-49 demographic and total viewers. It received a 2.4 rating and 5.06 million viewers. This was down from a 3.2 rating from the previous week.

=== Critical reception ===
Robert David Sullivan from The A.V. Club gave this episode a C, saying that "there's not much to laugh at in yet another flat episode". He especially criticized the inclusion of Carell's character, commenting, "Carell and his character, who has oddly normal body proportions for a Springfield resident, are not a great fit with the show. Carell speaks faster than everyone else, and he gets some uninterrupted, improv-like 'bits' that add to the sense that he’s not really interacting with the other voice actors", though he adds that the character's personality was effective as a contrast to Fat Tony. However, he praised the Lisa subplot, saying, "At least there's some fun, 'Treehouse Of Horror'-style animation here, as Lisa has a nightmare about riding a horse-sized grasshopper on a ranch full of giant insects..."

Jen Johnson of Den of Geek stated that she enjoyed hearing Carell as a wimpy character and attacking Lisa's grasshoppers. She also highlighted the limit of Lisa's vegetarianism by having her eat insects.
