= The Day the Earth Stood Cool =

- The Simpsons episode
- Episode no.: Season 24; Episode 7
- Directed by: Matthew Faughnan
- Written by: Matt Selman
- Production code: PABF20
- Original air date: December 9, 2012

Guest appearances
- Fred Armisen as Terrence; Carrie Brownstein as Emily; Colin Meloy as himself; Patton Oswalt as T-Rex; Marcia Wallace as Mrs. Krabappel

Episode features
- Commentary: Matt Selman: Al Jean; Tom Gammill; Colin Meloy

Episode chronology
← Previous "A Tree Grows in Springfield"	Next → "To Cur with Love"
- The Simpsons season 24

"The Day the Earth Stood Cool" is the seventh episode of the twenty-fourth season of the American animated television series The Simpsons. The episode was directed by Matthew Faughnan and written by Matt Selman. It originally aired on the Fox network in the United States on December 9, 2012.

In this episode, a family from Portland moves to Springfield and clashes with the Simpson family. Fred Armisen, Carrie Brownstein, and Patton Oswalt guest star as the new family. The episode received positive reviews.

== Plot ==
Homer becomes upset when someone believes him to be Bart's grandfather, and worries that he is no longer cool. He then meets Terrance, a cool donut chef from Portland, who is looking for a new place for him and his family to live as he believes Portland has been "played out". When he tells Homer that he sees potential in Springfield, Homer suggests he buy the house next door to his, which he does.

The Simpsons meet Terrance's wife Emily, his pet armadillo Chuy, their daughter Corduroy and their son T-Rex, and get their first exposure to their way of life. While Homer and Lisa are immediately taken with the family, Bart is irritated by T-Rex's cynicism and Marge is uncomfortable in their presence, particularly of Emily's public breastfeeding. Despite this, Marge supports Homer in his desire to fit in with their lifestyle, and allows him to combine their yard with the neighbor's into a "mono-yard" and lets him, Bart and Lisa accompany Terrance and T-Rex to rock shows, Mexican wrestling, roller derby, Korean gangster films and Modern Art exhibitions, even though she grows concerned that the kids are becoming pretentious. The Simpsons are invited to T-Rex's birthday party, where Marge makes enemies of Emily and her fellow nursing mother friends by refusing to breast-feed Maggie. Meanwhile, T-Rex mocks Homer's present and calls him a poseur, which angers Bart, and he starts a fight with him. This causes friction between the families (Homer is uninvited to go midnight bike-riding), but when Bart explains himself, Homer decides to sever all ties with Terrance and his family.

Homer and Marge pressure Terrance and Emily to leave Springfield, but their "humble-bragging" of the town results in more cool people moving to Springfield, and their lifestyle quickly consumes the town. Meanwhile, Bart makes up with T-Rex and invites him to watch TV with him. Excited by the prospect, he abandons his compost-turning duties and joins Bart. The unturned compost, however, catches fire and starts to spread. Homer and Terrance work together to put out the fire using large drums of baby formula Marge keeps in the garage. Terrance and Emily apologize to Homer and Marge for being so judgmental.

Shortly after, the New York Times names Springfield 'America's Coolest City', which means it is played out. Immediately upon hearing this, Terrance and Emily and the rest of the cool people move, much to Lisa's dismay.

== Production ==
=== Development ===
Production from conception to airing took three years. Writer and executive producer Matt Selman first conceived a Portland inspired episode after former Simpsons writer and producer Bill Oakley moved to Oregon. The story would have been about the Simpsons moving to Portland with Lisa expecting to embrace the city. Then, it would end with the other family members enjoying Portland but not Lisa. However, once the television series Portlandia debuted, Selman decided to change the story. Instead, the story became about people with a Portland attitude moving to Springfield. The episode is a homage to Portland and Portlandia, on which Oakley was a writer. The Portland-based band The Decemberists composed the score for part of the episode. The 2019 episode Marge the Lumberjill features the Simpsons visiting Portland.

=== Casting ===
In January 2012, TVLine reported that Portlandia stars Fred Armisen and Carrie Brownstein would guest star in the episode. Armisen and Brownstein played Terrence and Emily, respectively. They recorded their lines with Dan Castellaneta about a year prior to the episode's airing. Patton Oswalt was cast as their son, T-Rex. The Decemberists' lead singer Colin Meloy played himself.

Selman wanted Armisen and Brownstein to return in future episodes. Armisen reprised his role in the thirty-fourth season episode "Pin Gal."

== Cultural references ==
Terrence's shop, Devil Doughnuts, is inspired by Portland-based Voodoo Doughnut. T-Rex has a banner for English football club West Ham United F.C. in his room, but not in the team's colors. The official Twitter account for West Ham acknowledged the nod. Emily has copies of satirical newspaper The Onion and its non-satirical child publication The A.V. Club on her coffee table.

== Reception ==
=== Ratings ===
The episode was watched by a total of 7.44 million viewers and it received a 3.4 rating in the 18-49 demographic making it the most watched show on Animation Domination that night in both total viewers and the 18-49 demographic.

=== Critical reception ===
The episode received mostly positive reception.

Robert David Sullivan from The A.V. Club gave the episode a B+, saying, "It's one of the most disciplined Simpsons episodes ever, with no B-plots and nary a tangent, and it’s the most consistently funny so far this season."

Teresa Lopez of TV Fanatic gave the episode 4.5 out of 5 stars. She called the episode brilliant for parodying Portland culture.

In 2014, Vulture named this episode the 100th best episode of The Simpsons to stream. It repeated the same rank in 2019.
