= Hardly Kirk-ing =

- The Simpsons episode
- Episode no.: Season 24; Episode 13
- Directed by: Matthew Nastuk
- Written by: Tom Gammill and Max Pross
- Production code: RABF05
- Original air date: February 17, 2013

Guest appearance
- Kevin Michael Richardson as Book Store Security Guard

Episode features
- Couch gag: A spoof of the Game of Thrones opening sequence (first seen in "Exit Through the Kwik-E-Mart"), but in this version, at the end, a knight chops Homer's head off (and part of Marge's hair) with a sword.

Episode chronology
← Previous "Love Is a Many-Splintered Thing"	Next → "Gorgeous Grampa"
- The Simpsons season 24

"Hardly Kirk-ing" is the thirteenth episode of the twenty-fourth season of the American animated television series The Simpsons, and the 521st episode overall. The episode was directed by Matthew Nastuk and written by Tom Gammill and Max Pross. It originally aired on the Fox network in the United States on February 17, 2013.

In this episode, Bart accidentally gives Milhouse a haircut that make him look like his father while Homer develops a skill for finding hidden objects. The episode received positive reviews.

The first time the episode aired in the United States, the opening was shortened to allow time for Fox to air Maggie Simpson in: The Longest Daycare; there was no chalkboard gag, and the couch gag consisted only of the knight cutting off Homer's head.

== Plot ==
Marge takes the family out on a TV-free day after finding Maggie watching a DVD from the Baby Poindexter collection, which, according to the news, was pulled for being ineffective in educating children (even though Homer likes it because it is not merchandise-driven like so many kids' shows today). A flashback reveals the material in question sent a younger Bart into a drooling fit while Lisa turns the presentation's packaging into an interactive diorama. The family goes to a bookstore, where Homer becomes fascinated with hidden-object puzzles and begins using his skills to find people and common objects in the real world.

Meanwhile, Bart hangs out at Milhouse's place. While bored, Bart squirts some epoxy in Milhouse's hair. Bart gives him a haircut to remove it, but he removes most of Milhouse's hair as a result, making him look just like his father Kirk. With Bart's help, Milhouse dresses up like his dad, becoming taller with the help of homemade stilts made from paint cans and making his voice sound like Kirk's by tying a tie tightly around his neck (though if the tie is put too tightly around his neck, he sounds like Duffman). Bart uses this to his advantage, as Milhouse, looking like an adult, is now able to commit adult activities. They bully Homer, purchase items for school bullies Jimbo, Kearney, and Dolph, and participate in municipal voting.

When Lisa wishes to go to downtown Springfield, Milhouse is able to buy tickets for himself, Lisa, and Bart. He collects a portion of the class action settlement being paid out to people who bought Baby Poindexter DVDs, but the money he receives is not enough to buy food for the three of them. They are forced to attend a condominium sales presentation for a free breakfast, but find that the doors have been locked to prevent them from leaving. The saleswoman, thinking Milhouse is an adult, attempts to seduce him. Homer and Marge, realizing the children are missing, rush to find them. Homer stops by for the free meal, rescuing the three children by coincidence. Milhouse later apologizes to Kirk for impersonating him, and admits that he wants to grow up to be just like him.

== Production ==
The timeslot for this episode was extended five minutes to 8:35 PM so that the animated short The Longest Daycare could air after the episode.

== Reception ==
=== Critical reception ===
The episode received mostly positive reviews.

Robert David Sullivan of The A.V. Club gave the episode a B−, saying, "We're still a long way past Simpsons episodes with emotional resonance, but plain weirdness works better than the constant cutaways and pop-culture-dropping of last week's episode. Milhouse is not an overused character, and he still has kind of a Charlie Brown quality that allows us to see humor in his adult-like, well-articulated neuroses, so that it doesn't feel as if we're laughing at an actual little boy."

Teresa Lopez of TV Fanatic gave the episode 2.5 out of 5 stars. She stated that not much happened with Milhouse impersonating an adult and was disturbed with Bart having a condom in his mouth. She highlighted Homer's scenes with his improving searching ability.

Rob Dawson of TV Equals gave the episode a positive review, saying: "'Hardly Kirk-ing' is the kind of episode that I wish The Simpsons could pump out every week these days. It's well-constructed and funny, it is what I want late-period The Simpsons to be. It keeps itself together, plays off the larger extended universe of Springfield without seeming like a parade of 'hey, I recognize that guy', and is, most importantly, entertaining."

=== Awards and nominations ===
Tom Gammill & Max Pross were nominated for a Writers Guild of America Award for Outstanding Writing in Animation at the 66th Writers Guild of America Awards for their script to this episode.

=== Ratings ===
The episode received a 2.0 in the 18-49 demographic and was watched by a total of 4.57 million viewers. This made it the second most watched show on Fox's Animation Domination line up that night.
