= Adventures in Baby-Getting =

- The Simpsons episode
- Episode no.: Season 24; Episode 3
- Directed by: Rob Oliver
- Written by: Bill Odenkirk
- Production code: PABF18
- Original air date: November 4, 2012

Guest appearance
- Jeff Gordon as himself

Episode features
- Chalkboard gag: "Mousetraps are not slippers" (mentioned, in-episode)
- Couch gag: The family is sitting on the couch, being formed piece by piece by animation cel, showing the internal organs, muscles and skin. Homer then grabs a donut from his stomach and eats it, with the donut's parts being shown on the cel too.

Episode chronology
← Previous "Treehouse of Horror XXIII"	Next → "Gone Abie Gone"
- The Simpsons season 24

"Adventures in Baby-Getting" is the third episode of the twenty-fourth season of the American animated television series The Simpsons. The episode was directed by Rob Oliver and written by Bill Odenkirk. It aired on the Fox network in the United States on November 4, 2012.

In this episode, Marge and Homer attempt to have another child while Bart investigates what Lisa is doing after school. Race car driver Jeff Gordon guest starred as himself. The episode received mixed results.

== Plot ==
=== Homer Votes 2012 short with changes ===
On election day, Homer is on his way to vote while showing his bitterness about voting. At the voting booth, Homer cannot decide between Barack Obama or Mitt Romney, as both have flaws. Homer votes for Romney, but is shocked to find he got a medical deduction for a personality implant, he has six wives named Ann, and the government paid him taxes for five years. Before Homer can tell the press, he is sucked into a tube and gets outsourced to a factory in China where American flags are made. Homer is satisfied with the outcome because he has a job until Selma comes out of the tube.

=== Main story ===
Homer's neglect to fix a dripping faucet causes the water to seep underground and create a cavern underneath the town square. The ground caves in, and Marge drives her car into the hole. She and the kids get out, but Marge cannot recover her car when the hole is filled and covered with asphalt. Marge purchases a new car but dislikes it. She cannot articulate her reasons, but eventually tells Homer that the five-seater car destroys her chances at having another baby. Homer appears to support her but is secretly horrified. Meanwhile, Bart and Milhouse find a message dropped by Lisa that reads in cursive, "The five boxing wizards jump quickly." They see Lisa sneak off into a taxicab.

The boys recruit Nelson and Ralph to profile her mind and find the meaning of the message. While following Lisa, Nelson and Ralph find another message, also in cursive, saying, "Sphinx of black quartz, judge my vow.". Meanwhile, Homer and Marge find that their chances of having a baby are nonexistent, as Homer's sperm are dead. However, Moe reveals that Homer sold some of his sperm to the Shelbyville Fertility Clinic a few years back.

Homer and Marge head for the clinic, and Homer diverts Marge's attention by taking a historic route and stopping by several places. This plan fails, prompting him to admit his feelings about another baby and that he never wanted to be a father. This angers her, and the two drive home. Meanwhile, the boys are joined by Principal Skinner, who is concerned with Lisa's disappearances. Skinner deduces that the paper used for both messages belongs to the previous principal. The five visit her house and find Lisa there. Lisa reveals she was learning cursive writing, a topic that the school cannot afford to teach. The two messages were practice sentences, as both consisted of every letter of the alphabet.

Stopping at a restaurant, Homer observes a family of six and finds father enjoying himself with the youngest child. Changing his mind, he and Marge go to the clinic. Marge is horrified to learn that Homer sold a lot of sperm to the clinic, resulting in many Homer-like babies. She tells Homer that they should wait, and Homer agrees. He takes the family to a drive-in movie and spots a set of newborn septuplets who resemble him, and he and they yell "D'oh!" at the same time.

== Production ==
In its original airing, the opening of the episode replayed a modified version of a video released in September 2012 showing Homer voting in the 2012 United States presidential election. In the original video, Flanders, not Selma, comes out of the tube. Homer then jumps out of the factory window and lands in a suicide net below.

Race car driver Jeff Gordon guest starred as himself. Executive producer Al Jean said his cameo is used to make fun of the show's use of celebrity guest star cameos.

The episode was originally scheduled to air on October 21, 2012 if the 2012 National League Championship Series did not extend to a sixth game. However, since this situation occurred, the air date was moved to November 11, 2012. Finally, it was moved to November 4, 2012.

== Reception ==
=== Ratings ===
The episode earned a 2.6 in the 18–49 demographic and was watched by a total of 5.54 million viewers becoming the most watched show in the 18–49 demographic and in total viewers that night in the Animation Domination lineup.

=== Critical reception ===
The episode received mixed reviews.

At The A.V. Club, Robert David Sullivan gave the episode a C rating, saying, "After the annual 'Treehouse Of Horror' and a break for the World Series, The Simpsons is back with an episode that’s not quite as sour as its season opener but is still disappointingly thin." He especially criticized the subplot with Lisa, commenting that it was "[not] any funnier than it sounds."

Teresa Lopez of TV Fanatic gave the episode 3 out of 5 stars. She stated that the episode made her feel like the show should be ending. She said the funniest part was Homer retrieving his sperm sample.
