= Bull-E =

- The Simpsons episode
- Episode no.: Season 26; Episode 21
- Directed by: Lance Kramer
- Written by: Tim Long
- Production code: TABF15
- Original air date: May 10, 2015

Guest appearances
- Albert Brooks as Dr. Raufbold; Joe Mantegna as Fat Tony; Johnny Mathis as himself

Episode features
- Couch gag: Homer fails at making goal saves, as Maggie continues kicking soccer balls at him until he is buried in them.

Episode chronology
← Previous "Let's Go Fly a Coot"	Next → "Mathlete's Feat"
- The Simpsons season 26

"Bull-E" is the twenty-first episode of the twenty-sixth season of the American animated television series The Simpsons, and the 573rd overall episode of the series. The episode was directed by Lance Kramer and written by Tim Long. It originally aired on the Fox network in the United States on May 10, 2015.

In this episode, the town passes an anti-bullying law when Bart is bullied, but Homer is arrested when he is accused of bullying Ned. Albert Brooks guest starred, and musician Johnny Mathis appeared as himself. The episode received positive reviews.

== Plot ==
Bart is not excited about going to his first school dance, but after he accidentally destroys the orange drink machine that Nelson's mom's fiancé brought over, a 5th grade girl is impressed and asks him to dance. Bart then wins the "Best Dancer" trophy and his date asks him to meet her outside, but the bullies are waiting for him and they break his trophy and mock him, leading his date to desert him. After a humiliated Bart tells Marge about the incident, she goes to a City Council meeting and says it is time to make bullies feel scared instead of their victims, and a bill giving the police wide powers to crack down on bullying is passed unanimously.

Chief Wiggum starts out by legitimately arresting bullies like Jimbo, Kearney, and Dolph after they try to steal Bart and Milhouse's sleds. However, due to how vaguely the law defines a bully, Wiggum soon begins to arrest anyone he wants to even if they are wrongly accused. Homer, who has abused the new law on anyone who even mildly inconveniences him, gets a taste of his own medicine when Rod and Todd Flanders, fed up with how Homer treats their father Ned, have him arrested and sentenced to 90 days of treatment. While in the center, Homer has an epiphany that he is cruel to Ned because his neighbor is better than him in every way. A distraught Homer begs for forgiveness which an angry Ned refuses several times for how he treated him. But after Homer penitently kneels on Ned's lawn for a long stretch, Ned reluctantly forgives him. The Simpsons and the Flanders then join and have brunch.

During the episode's subplot, Otto is another attendee of the school dance. Unaware that the fruit punch he’s drinking contains acid, the beverage unexpectedly causes him to hallucinate the School Train (a parody of Soul Train). Whilst on his acid trip, he meets Miss Frizzle, who uses her Magic School Bus to see inside his brain. This enrages Otto, so he takes out the now shrunken bus from his ear and squishes all of the people in it. He is woken from his dream by other jurors in a courtroom, where he has been made jury foreman.

== Production ==
In September 2014, an interview was published that revealed that singer Johnny Mathis had recorded lines for The Simpsons. He was able to observe Dan Castellaneta perform before he recorded his part as a gardener who sings a modified version of his song "Chances Are."

== Cultural references ==
While on drugs, Otto encounters characters that parody the ones from The Magic School Bus and the episode's title is a reference to the Pixar film WALL-E.

== Reception ==
The episode received a 1.2 rating and was watched by a total of 2.77 million people, making it the most watched show on Fox that night.

Dennis Perkins of The A.V. Club gave the episode a B, saying "since the Homer-Flanders dynamic can only stretch so far—Flanders has to stay Flanders, Homer Homer—an episode that sets out to seek an emotionally satisfying rapprochement between the two has to earn its eventual big moment, and "Bull-E" comes up just short."

Tony Sokol of Den of Geek gave the episode 4 out of 5 stars. He enjoyed the social commentary of the episode and the sight of Moe's seven seconds of cursing.

Stacy Glanzman of TV Fanatic gave the episode 4.5 of out 5 stars. She liked Homer modulating his voice for different reasons but disliked the repeated instance of Bart's interest in a girl and Otto's hallucination.
