= A Tree Grows in Springfield =

- The Simpsons episode
- Episode no.: Season 24; Episode 6
- Directed by: Timothy Bailey
- Written by: Stephanie Gillis
- Production code: PABF22
- Original air date: November 25, 2012

Guest appearances
- Kelsey Grammer as Sideshow Bob; Marcia Wallace as Edna Krabappel

Episode features
- Chalkboard gag: "20 more shoplifting days till Christmas"
- Couch gag: Marge, Lisa, Maggie and Bart sit on the couch as normal, but Homer comes in and surprises them with a bloody ax. This zooms out to reveal "Tales from the Couch".

Episode chronology
← Previous "Penny-Wiseguys"	Next → "The Day the Earth Stood Cool"
- The Simpsons season 24

"A Tree Grows in Springfield" is the sixth episode of the twenty-fourth season of the American animated television series The Simpsons. The episode was directed by Timothy Bailey and written by Stephanie Gillis. It originally aired on the Fox network in the United States on November 25, 2012.

In this episode, Homer wins a tablet computer, but after it breaks, he finds hope in a miracle.

The episode was seen by 7.46 million people during this broadcast and received positive reviews.

== Plot ==
While Homer is sleeping on a hammock, he is dreaming of playing in the World Series until he starts drowning because it starts raining. After rain leaks into the house, Homer starts feeling depressed over his life. Lisa decides to cheer him up by purchasing a raffle ticket at a fundraiser at Springfield Elementary School for a MyPad, and Homer wins.

Using the MyPad brightens Homer's mood. He begins using it all the time, which distracts him from work and his children. Playing with the MyPad while walking with Maggie, Homer falls through a manhole and shatters the MyPad.

Without the MyPad, Homer becomes sad again. Ned Flanders shows the Simpson family that the word "Hope" has been written on the Simpsons' backyard tree in sap. Flanders thinks it is a message from God saying He is there to help Homer in his time of need. Homer chooses to believe in the miracle. He invites the townspeople to come see the tree. However, reporter Kent Brockman decides to expose the truth of the matter.

Brockman finds a thermal video that shows someone wandering onto the Simpsons' backyard and writing "Hope" onto the tree with maple syrup. Homer is distraught once again until Marge reassures him that the hope he felt was real. Homer wonders who wrote the message on the tree. Later, someone approaches the backyard tree and continues writing "Hope" onto the tree. It is revealed to be a sleepwalking Homer.

The episode ends with an animated short called Logomania (a parody of Logorama). Malibu Stacy and a Happy Little Elf are driving through a city made of logos. They flirt with each other, but the elf is rear-ended by Burly, who catches Stacy's eye. When Funzo rampages through the city, Burly runs away, and Funzo captures Stacy. The elf rescues Stacy, and they kiss and drive away together.

== Cultural references ==
An animated version of David After Dentist is played on the shattered MyPad.

In July 2016, Fox released a modified version of the scene of Homer at the zoo where Homer is now playing Pokémon Go, which was released that month.

The episodes title is a reference to the 1943 novel A Tree Grows in Brooklyn.

== Reception ==
=== Ratings ===
The episode was watched by a total of 7.46 million viewers and received a 3.3 in the 18-49 demographic making it the most watched show on Animation Domination that night in terms of total viewers and the 18-49 demographic.

=== Critical reception ===
Robert David Sullivan from The A.V. Club gave the episode a B−, saying "'A Tree Grows In Springfield' turns out to be a throwback to early Simpsons in a season that’s been heavy on mean-spirited humor."

Teresa Lopez of TV Fanatic gave the episode 4.5 out of 5 stars. She was moved by the story of hope lost and found. She felt the comedy was effective because it was secondary to the story. However, she disliked the Logomania cartoon added to the end.

In 2014, PCMag named the scene of the Simpson family at the Mapple Store as one of their favorite geeky moments on the show.

=== Awards and nominations ===
Writer Stephanie Gillis was nominated for an Annie Award for Outstanding Achievement for Writing in an Animated Television/Broadcast Production at the 40th Annie Awards for this episode.
