= Moonshine River =

- The Simpsons episode
- Episode no.: Season 24; Episode 1
- Directed by: Bob Anderson
- Written by: Tim Long
- Production code: PABF21
- Original air date: September 30, 2012

Guest appearances
- Ken Burns as narrator; Zooey Deschanel as Mary Spuckler; Sarah Michelle Gellar as Gina Vendetti; Anne Hathaway as Jenny; Maurice LaMarche as Charlie Sheen; Don Pardo as Announcer; Natalie Portman as Darcy; Kevin Michael Richardson as Drummer; Al Roker as himself; Sarah Silverman as Nikki McKenna; Marcia Wallace as Mrs. Krabappel

Episode features
- Chalkboard gag: "I will not wear white after Labor Day" (Bart is wearing a white suit)
- Couch gag: Homer, Marge, Bart and Lisa are butterflies that come out of their cocoons and nearly get smashed by Gerald (the baby with a unibrow who Maggie hates). Maggie stops Gerald from smashing the butterfly Simpsons, and all four of them fly off into the sunset.
- Commentary: Al Jean: Tom Gammill; Zooey Deschanel; David Silverman; Bob Anderson

Episode chronology
← Previous "Lisa Goes Gaga"	Next → "Treehouse of Horror XXIII"
- The Simpsons season 24

"Moonshine River" is the first episode of the twenty-fourth season of the American animated television series The Simpsons. This episode was directed by Bob Anderson and written by Tim Long. It originally aired on the Fox network in the United States on September 30, 2012.

In this episode, Bart searches for his true love when he realizes that his relationships do not last long. The episode has eleven guest stars: Ken Burns, Zooey Deschanel, Sarah Michelle Gellar, Anne Hathaway, Maurice LaMarche, Don Pardo, Natalie Portman, Kevin Michael Richardson, Al Roker, Sarah Silverman, and Marcia Wallace. The episode received mixed reviews.

This is the second episode in which the Simpsons go to New York City after "The City of New York vs. Homer Simpson." The episode features references to the 1961 film Breakfast at Tiffany's. The title is a parody of that film's Academy Award-winning theme song, "Moon River."

== Plot ==
The Springfield Grand Prix and the Tour de Springfield turns disastrous when the race cars and bicyclists collide with each other. During the Racers Ball, Bart makes fun of Lisa for dancing with Milhouse, but Lisa says that he cannot have a long-term relationship once his girlfriends discover his true personality. Bart visits his past girlfriends to see if they still like him, but each one rejects him except Nikki, who is two-faced.

With one option left, Bart and Milhouse visit the Spuckler house to find Mary, but Cletus informs them that Mary ran away and he does not know where she is. However, Mary's brother tells Bart that Mary ran away to New York City and gives him her address. Bart thinks she might be his true love and asks Homer and Marge if they can go to New York. They initially refuse, but Homer finds a way to get the family to New York.

In New York City, Bart and Homer find Mary. Bart learns that Mary now works at Saturday Night Live. Mary sings a song for Bart, and the two realize that they love one another. Before they can kiss, Cletus arrives and asks her to return home. Mary accepts, but at the train station, she and Bart flee to another departing train while Cletus is distracted. Mary tells Bart that there will be more girls for him, gives him their first kiss, and leaves on the train. Cletus demands to know where Mary is going, but Bart refuses to tell him. Cletus accepts that he must let his daughter go. During the trip home, Cletus comforts Bart by giving him a photo of his children, including Mary.

Meanwhile, Marge, Lisa, and Maggie explore the city. They try to go to a Broadway show but give up when they can afford only the worst seats. Eventually arriving at a Shakespeare in the Park performance, the manager announces that the showing of Romeo and Juliet is canceled, as the actors portraying the Montagues and Capulets are feuding with one another. Enraged, Lisa enlists the audience members to take over the roles, and they perform the play. A review for the show initially disgusts Lisa, but she becomes happy when she learns the reviewer liked her performance.

During the end credits, the family announces a fan contest to submit their own couch gag, in which the winner's couch gag will appear on the show.

== Production ==
This is the second episode in which the Simpsons go to New York City after the ninth season episode "The City of New York vs. Homer Simpson." The producers wanted to pay homage to the 2000 film High Fidelity where Bart goes to visit past girlfriends to understand why things went wrong.

Zooey Deschanel reprised her role as Mary Spuckler from the nineteenth season episode "Apocalypse Cow." Sarah Michelle Gellar reprised her role as Gina Vendetti from the fifteenth season episode "The Wandering Juvie." Anne Hathaway reprised her role as Jenny from the twentieth season episode "The Good, the Sad and the Drugly." Natalie Portman reprised her role as Darcy from the eighteenth season episode "Little Big Girl." Sarah Silverman reprised her role as Nikki McKenna from the twenty-first season episode "Stealing First Base."

Deschanel continued her role later in the season with the episode "Love Is a Many-Splintered Thing."

== Cultural references ==
Parts of the plot parody the 1961 film Breakfast at Tiffany's and the 1957 film Sweet Smell of Success. Bart implies that, since his last visit, Homer's least favorite buildings in New York have been destroyed before naming New York Penn Station and Shea Stadium.

== Reception ==
=== Ratings ===
The episode earned a 3.8 adults 18–49 rating and received 8.08 million viewers, making it the most watched show in the Animation Domination lineup on Fox that night. That was on par with the previous season's premiere of a 3.9 rating and 8.08 million viewers.

=== Critical reception ===
The episode received mixed reviews, with much of the criticism aimed at the anti-climax and cultural references.

Robert David Sullivan from The A.V. Club gave the episode a C−, commenting, "I have three criteria that a new episode can meet to be deemed watchable: Is there a coherent story? Does the episode make good use of the town of Springfield, one of the greatest mythological communities in all of fiction? And does the episode offer a smart take on some current cultural or political fad? To be clear, a 'yes' to just one of these questions would make the 508th or 509th episode worthwhile. 'Moonshine River' doesn't qualify on any count." However, he praised the couch gag, saying, "Much like the cold openings on The Office, the 'couch gags' that open The Simpsons are now consistently the most enjoyable part of the show. During the past couple of seasons, the extended opening scenes by guest animators Banksy and Bill Plympton were more talked-about than any episode itself. 'Moonshine River' opens with a cute, 40-second cartoon depicting the Simpsons as butterflies menaced by a mallet-wielding Baby Gerald (a.k.a. the Unibrow Baby)."

Teresa Lopez of TV Fanatic gave the episode 3 out of 5 stars. She felt the plot was not original except for Marge and Lisa's exploration of New York on a limited budget. She highlighted the update of the status of the Khlav Kalash vendor from "The City of New York vs. Homer Simpson."
