= Matthew Nastuk =

American animation director on The Simpsons

Matthew Nastuk is an American animation director on The Simpsons. He started directing during the tenth season, and has since directed over two dozen episodes and continues to direct today.

== The Simpsons episodes ==
He has directed the following episodes:

=== Season 10 ===
- "D'oh-in' in the Wind"
- "Make Room for Lisa"

=== Season 11 ===
- "Grift of the Magi"

=== Season 12 ===
- "Treehouse of Horror XI"
- "Worst Episode Ever"

=== Season 13 ===
- "Brawl in the Family"
- "The Sweetest Apu"

=== Season 14 ===
- "Barting Over"

=== Season 15 ===
- "The Fat and the Furriest"
- "Milhouse Doesn't Live Here Anymore"
- "Catch 'Em If You Can"

=== Season 16 ===
- "She Used to Be My Girl"
- "The Seven-Beer Snitch"

=== Season 17 ===
- "The Last of the Red Hat Mamas"
- "Homer Simpson, This Is Your Wife"

=== Season 18 ===
- "Ice Cream of Margie (with the Light Blue Hair)"
- "Homerazzi"
- "You Kent Always Say What You Want"

=== Season 19 ===
- "Midnight Towboy"
- "The Debarted"

=== Season 20 ===
- "Lisa the Drama Queen"
- "Father Knows Worst"

=== Season 21 ===
- "Once Upon a Time in Springfield"
- "Moe Letter Blues"

=== Season 22 ===
- "Lisa Simpson, This Isn't Your Life"
- "Angry Dad: The Movie"

=== Season 23 ===
- "The Falcon and the D'ohman"
- "At Long Last Leave"

=== Season 24 ===
- "Gone Abie Gone"
- "Hardly Kirk-ing"
- "Whiskey Business"

=== Season 25 ===
- "Steal This Episode"
- "What to Expect When Bart's Expecting"
- "Brick Like Me"

=== Season 26 ===
- "Opposites A-Frack"
- "The Musk Who Fell to Earth"

=== Season 27 ===
- "Every Man's Dream"
- "Gal of Constant Sorrow"
- "Simprovised"

=== Season 28 ===
- "Monty Burns' Fleeing Circus"
- "Pork and Burns"
- "Moho House"

=== Season 29 ===
- "The Old Blue Mayor She Ain't What She Used to Be"
- "Flanders' Ladder"

=== Season 30 ===
- "From Russia Without Love"
- "I'm Dancing as Fat as I Can"
- "D'oh Canada"

=== Season 31 ===
- "Gorillas on the Mast"
- "The Miseducation of Lisa Simpson"

=== Season 32 ===
- "The Road to Cincinnati"
- "Diary Queen"
- "Panic on the Streets of Springfield"

=== Season 33 ===
- "The Wayz We Were"
- "The Longest Marge"

=== Season 34 ===
- "One Angry Lisa"

=== Season 35 ===
- "It's a Blunderful Life"
- "AE Bonny Romance"

=== Season 36 ===
- "Desperately Seeking Lisa"
- "Homer and Her Sisters"
- "Estranger Things"

=== Season 37 ===
- "Seperance"
