= Tim Long =

American writer (born 1969)

- Born: June 14, 1969 (age 57); Brandon, Manitoba, Canada
- Education: University College, Toronto
- Occupation: Comedy writer

Tim Long (born June 14, 1969) is a comedy writer born in Brandon, Manitoba, Canada. Long calls Exeter, Ontario, his home town and has written for The Simpsons, Politically Incorrect, Spy magazine and the Late Show with David Letterman. Currently credited as a co-executive producer on The Simpsons, Long was – until Season 20 – credited as an executive producer. His work has also recently appeared in The New York Times and The New Yorker. He also wrote the episode "Mr Roboto" for YTV's Mr. Young.

Long was also a consulting writer on The Simpsons Movie (2007).

He attended high school at South Huron District High School in Exeter, Ontario, Canada.

Long graduated from University College at the University of Toronto with a major in English Literature and pursued graduate studies in English at Columbia University. He was an intern at Spy magazine under E. Graydon Carter before joining the staff of The David Letterman Show, where he wrote for three years, including one year as Head Writer. He has won five Emmy awards, and been nominated for eight others.

== Writing credits ==
=== The Simpsons episodes ===
Long has written the following episodes:

- "Simpsons Bible Stories" (with Matt Selman and Larry Doyle) (1999)
- "Treehouse of Horror X" (Desperately Xeeking Xena) (1999)
- "Saddlesore Galactica" (2000)
- "Behind the Laughter" (with George Meyer, Matt Selman, and Mike Scully) (2000)
- "Skinner's Sense of Snow" (2000)
- "New Kids on the Blecch" (2001)
- "Half-Decent Proposal" (2002)
- "Bart vs. Lisa vs. the Third Grade" (2002)
- "Brake My Wife, Please" (2003)
- "She Used to Be My Girl" (2004)
- "Homer and Ned's Hail Mary Pass" (2005)
- "Mobile Homer" (2005)
- "Million Dollar Abie" (2006)
- "You Kent Always Say What You Want" (2007)
- "Homer and Lisa Exchange Cross Words" (2008)
- "The Devil Wears Nada" (2009)
- "Elementary School Musical" (2010)
- "MoneyBART" (2010)
- "Bart Stops to Smell the Roosevelts" (2011)
- "Moe Goes from Rags to Riches" (2012)
- "Lisa Goes Gaga" (2012)
- "Moonshine River" (2012)
- "Love is a Many-Splintered Thing" (2013)
- "The Kid Is All Right" (2013)
- "Married to the Blob" (2014)
- "Bull-E" (2015)
- "Springfield Splendor" (with Miranda Thompson) (2017)
- "Haw-Haw Land" (with Miranda Thompson) (2018)
- "D'oh Canada" (with Miranda Thompson) (2019)
- "Todd, Todd, Why Hast Thou Forsaken Me?" (with Miranda Thompson) (2019)
- "Panic in the Streets of Springfield" (2021)
- "Poorhouse Rock" (2022)
- "Homer's Adventures Through the Windshield Glass" (2023)
- "Desperately Seeking Lisa" (2024)
- "Estranger Things" (2025)
- "Treehouse of Horror XXXVII" (with Joel H. Cohen and Jessica Conrad) (2026)
