= She Used to Be My Girl =

- The Simpsons episode
- Episode no.: Season 16; Episode 4
- Directed by: Matthew Nastuk
- Written by: Tim Long
- Production code: FABF22
- Original air date: December 5, 2004

Guest appearance
- Kim Cattrall as Chloe Talbot

Episode features
- Chalkboard gag: "Poking a dead raccoon is not research"
- Couch gag: Everyone in the family looks like Moe Szyslak--including the female members of the family.
- Commentary: Al Jean; Matt Selman; Tim Long; Ian Maxtone-Graham; Tom Gammill; Max Pross; Michael Price; Kim Cattrall

Episode chronology
| ← Previous "Sleeping with the Enemy" | Next → "Fat Man and Little Boy" |
- The Simpsons season 16

"She Used to Be My Girl" is the fourth episode of the sixteenth season of the American animated television series The Simpsons. It originally aired on the Fox network in the United States on December 5, 2004. The episode was written by Tim Long and directed by Matthew Nastuk.

In this episode, Marge becomes jealous of her successful high school friend when Lisa begins to bond with her. Kim Cattrall guest starred as Chloe Talbot. The episode received negative reviews.

== Plot ==
One day, Marge sees a friend from high school, Chloe Talbot, on TV and is jealous of her success as a news reporter. When they meet, an embarrassed Marge confesses she never left Springfield, but the two are glad to see each other again. Chloe comes to the Simpsons' house for dinner, but her exciting stories annoy Marge and inspire Lisa, who goes out to dinner with Chloe.

Marge reveals that she and Chloe were reporters for their high school newspaper, but after high school Marge stayed with her sweetheart Homer after Bart was born, with Chloe leaving her sweetheart Barney when he proposed. With all of Chloe's success, Marge seems to begin to resent both her decision and her family but receives supporting words from Homer.

On their way back from dinner, Chloe invites Lisa to the United Nations women's conference, with Lisa saying she would need parental permission. Upon arriving at the Simpsons house, a drunk Marge, who is worried that Lisa likes Chloe more, provokes Chloe and the two fight on the lawn. This leaves Marge with a black eye.

After Marge talks with Lisa about what happened, she forbids her to go to the women's conference, but Lisa sneaks out and hides in Chloe's car's trunk. Then, as Chloe drives off, her boss calls her, telling her to cover the story of the eruption of Springfield Volcano. When Lisa pops out of the trunk, Chloe has her be her cameraman after her original one fled at the sight of lava.

When Marge and Homer arrive at the women's conference to find Lisa, they see Chloe's live broadcast from the volcano, crediting Lisa behind the camera and the two trapped by a sea of lava. Marge and Homer race to the volcano and the former leaps from rock to rock to rescue Lisa. Moments later, Barney descends in a helicopter to rescue Chloe, who grants him a half hour of pity sex.

When Marge imagines her life as a reporter, she screams to her family, who shows little interest.

== Production ==
The episode was written by Tim Long. Kim Cattrall guest starred as Chloe Talbot.

== Reception ==
=== Viewing figures ===
In its original American broadcast, "She Used to Be My Girl" was viewed by 10.3 million people.

=== Critical response ===
Colin Jacobson of DVD Movie Guide said the episode was better than the previous one but thought the season's focus on Marge and Lisa so far has not provided any "good material".

On Four Finger Discount, Guy Davis and Brendan Dando did not like the episode but liked the performance by Kim Cattrall. They also thought they had already seen previous episodes of Marge being jealous of other women whom Lisa idolizes.
