= Mothers and Other Strangers (disambiguation) =

"Mothers and Other Strangers" is an episode of The Simpsons.

Mothers and Other Strangers may also refer to:

- "Mothers and Other Strangers", an episode of Roseanne
- My Mother and Other Strangers, a 2016 British television drama series
