= Writers Guild of America Award for Television: Animation =

Annual television award

- Awarded for: Outstanding Writing in Animation
- Country: United States
- Presented by: Writers Guild of America
- First award: 2003
- Currently held by: Mehar Sethi for Long Story Short (2025)
- Website: www.wga.org

The Writers Guild of America Award for Television: Animation is an award presented by the Writers Guild of America to the best writing in an animated television program.

== History ==
It has been presented annually since the 55th Writers Guild of America Awards in 2003 where Futurama won the first award. Before the award's inception, animated programs were submitted under their appropriate category (either episodic comedy or episodic drama). However, no animated programs received nominations. The Simpsons is the only program to win more than three awards, winning fourteen. It also holds the record for nominations with 60.

== Winners and nominees ==
=== Notes ===
- The years denote when the episode first aired; the awards are presented the following year. Though, due to the eligibility period, some nominees could have aired in a different year. For the first 16 years, the eligibility period was December 1 to November 30. Starting in 2018, the eligibility period shifted to correspond with the calendar year (January 1 to December 31). The winners are highlighted in gold.

=== 2000s ===
Year	Show	Episode	Writer(s)	Network	Ref.
2002 (55th)	Futurama	"Godfellas"	Ken Keeler	Fox	
2002 (55th)	King of the Hill	"My Own Private Rodeo"	Alex Gregory & Peter Huyck	Fox	
2002 (55th)	Santa Baby!		Peter Bakalian & Suzanne Collins	Fox	
2002 (55th)	The Simpsons	"The Bart Wants What It Wants"	John Frink & Don Payne	Fox	
2002 (55th)	The Simpsons	"Jaws Wired Shut"	Matt Selman	Fox	
2002 (55th)	The Simpsons	"Blame It on Lisa"	Bob Bendetson	Fox	
2003 (56th)	The Simpsons	"The Dad Who Knew Too Little"	Matt Selman	Fox	
2003 (56th)	The Adventures of Jimmy Neutron: Boy Genius	"Operation: Rescue Jet Fusion"	Steven Banks	Nickelodeon	
2003 (56th)	Futurama	"The Sting"	Patric Verrone	Fox	
2003 (56th)	King of the Hill	"Reborn to be Wild"	Tony Gama-Lobo & Rebecca May	Fox	
2003 (56th)	The Simpsons	"Moe Baby Blues"	J. Stewart Burns	Fox	
2003 (56th)	The Simpsons	"My Mother the Carjacker"	Michael Price	Fox	
2004 (57th)	The Simpsons	"Catch 'Em If You Can"	Ian Maxtone-Graham	Fox	
2004 (57th)	Justice League	"Starcrossed"	Part I: Rich Fogel; Part II: Story by : Rich Fogel; Teleplay by : John Ridley; Part III: Rich Fogel and Dwayne McDuffie	Cartoon Network	
2004 (57th)	The Simpsons	"Fraudcast News"	Don Payne	Fox	
2004 (57th)	The Simpsons	"Milhouse Doesn't Live Here Anymore"	Julie Chambers & David Chambers	Fox	
2004 (57th)	The Simpsons	"Today I Am a Clown"	Joel H. Cohen	Fox	
2005 (58th)	The Simpsons	"Mommie Beerest"	Michael Price	Fox	
2005 (58th)	The Simpsons	"The Father, the Son and the Holy Guest Star"	Matt Warburton	Fox	
2005 (58th)	The Simpsons	"The Girl Who Slept Too Little"	John Frink	Fox	
2005 (58th)	The Simpsons	"See Homer Run"	Stephanie Gillis	Fox	
2005 (58th)	The Simpsons	"Thank God, It's Doomsday"	Don Payne	Fox	
2005 (58th)	The Simpsons	"There's Something About Marrying"	J. Stewart Burns	Fox	
2006 (59th)	The Simpsons	"The Italian Bob"	John Frink	Fox	
2006 (59th)	King of the Hill	"Church Hopping"	Jim Dauterive	Fox	
2006 (59th)	The Life and Times of Juniper Lee	"Who's Your Daddy?"	Marsha Griffin	Cartoon Network	
2006 (59th)	The Simpsons	"Girls Just Want to Have Sums"	Matt Selman	Fox	
2006 (59th)	The Simpsons	"Kiss Kiss Bang Bangalore"	Dan Castellaneta & Deb Lacusta	Fox	
2006 (59th)	The Simpsons	"Simpsons Christmas Stories"	Don Payne	Fox	
2007 (60th)	The Simpsons	"Kill Gil: Vols. 1 & 2"	Jeff Westbrook	Fox	
2007 (60th)	King of the Hill	"Lucky's Wedding Suit"	Jim Dauterive	Fox	
2007 (60th)	King of the Hill	"The Passion of the Dauterive"	Tony Gama-Lobo & Rebecca May	Fox	
2007 (60th)	The Simpsons	"The Haw-Hawed Couple"	Matt Selman	Fox	
2007 (60th)	The Simpsons	"The Homer of Seville"	Carolyn Omine	Fox	
2007 (60th)	The Simpsons	"Stop or My Dog Will Shoot"	John Frink	Fox	
2008 (61st)	The Simpsons	"Apocalypse Cow"	Jeff Westbrook	Fox	
2008 (61st)	King of the Hill	"Life: A Loser's Manual"	Dan McGrath	Fox	
2008 (61st)	King of the Hill	"Strangeness on a Train"	Jim Dauterive	Fox	
2008 (61st)	The Simpsons	"The Debarted"	Joel H. Cohen	Fox	
2008 (61st)	The Simpsons	"E Pluribus Wiggum"	Michael Price	Fox	
2008 (61st)	The Simpsons	"Homer and Lisa Exchange Cross Words"	Tim Long	Fox	
2009 (62nd)	The Simpsons	"Wedding for Disaster"	Joel H. Cohen	Fox	
2009 (62nd)	The Simpsons	"The Burns and the Bees"	Stephanie Gillis	Fox	
2009 (62nd)	The Simpsons	"Eeny Teeny Maya Moe"	John Frink	Fox	
2009 (62nd)	The Simpsons	"Gone Maggie Gone"	Billy Kimball & Ian Maxtone-Graham	Fox	
2009 (62nd)	The Simpsons	"Take My Life, Please"	Don Payne	Fox	

=== 2010s ===
Year	Show	Episode	Writer(s)	Network	Ref.
2010 (63rd)	Futurama	"The Prisoner of Benda"	Ken Keeler	Comedy Central	
2010 (63rd)	Back at the Barnyard	"Treasure Hunt"	Tom Sheppard	Nickelodeon	
2010 (63rd)	Futurama	"Lrrreconcilable Ndndifferences"	Patric Verrone	Comedy Central	
2010 (63rd)	The Simpsons	"Moe Letter Blues"	Stephanie Gillis	Fox	
2010 (63rd)	The Simpsons	"O Brother, Where Bart Thou?"	Matt Selman	Fox	
2011 (64th)	The Simpsons	"Homer the Father"	Joel H. Cohen	Fox	
2011 (64th)	Ben 10: Ultimate Alien	"Moonstruck"	Len Uhley	Cartoon Network	
2011 (64th)	Futurama	"The Silence of the Clamps"	Eric Rogers	Comedy Central	
2011 (64th)	The Simpsons	"Bart Stops to Smell the Roosevelts"	Tim Long	Fox	
2011 (64th)	The Simpsons	"The Blue and the Grey"	Rob LaZebnik	Fox	
2011 (64th)	The Simpsons	"Donnie Fatso"	Chris Cluess	Fox	
2012 (65th)	The Simpsons	"Ned 'n Edna's Blend Agenda"	Jeff Westbrook	Fox	
2012 (65th)	Family Guy	"Forget-Me-Not"	David A. Goodman	Fox	
2012 (65th)	Futurama	"A Farewell to Arms"	Josh Weinstein	Comedy Central	
2012 (65th)	The Simpsons	"Holidays of Future Passed"	J. Stewart Burns	Fox	
2012 (65th)	The Simpsons	"Treehouse of Horror XXIII"	David Mandel & Brian Kelley	Fox	
2013 (66th)	The Simpsons	"A Test Before Trying"	Joel H. Cohen	Fox	
2013 (66th)	Futurama	"Game of Tones"	Michael Rowe	Comedy Central	
2013 (66th)	Futurama	"Murder on the Planet Express"	Lewis Morton	Comedy Central	
2013 (66th)	Futurama	"Saturday Morning Fun Pit"	Patric Verrone	Comedy Central	
2013 (66th)	The Simpsons	"Hardly Kirk-ing"	Tom Gammill & Max Pross	Fox	
2013 (66th)	The Simpsons	"YOLO"	Michael Nobori	Fox	
2014 (67th)	The Simpsons	"Brick Like Me"	Brian Kelley	Fox	
2014 (67th)	Bob's Burgers	"Bob and Deliver"	Greg Thompson	Fox	
2014 (67th)	Bob's Burgers	"Work Hard or Die Trying, Girl"	Nora Smith	Fox	
2014 (67th)	The Simpsons	"Covercraft"	Matt Selman	Fox	
2014 (67th)	The Simpsons	"Pay Pal"	David H. Steinberg	Fox	
2014 (67th)	The Simpsons	"Steal This Episode"	J. Stewart Burns	Fox	
2015 (68th)	Bob's Burgers	"Housetrap"	Dan Fybel	Fox	
2015 (68th)	Bob's Burgers	"Gayle Makin' Bob Sled"	Lizzie Molyneux & Wendy Molyneux	Fox	
2015 (68th)	BoJack Horseman	"Hank After Dark"	Kelly Galuska	Netflix	
2015 (68th)	The Simpsons	"Halloween of Horror"	Carolyn Omine	Fox	
2015 (68th)	The Simpsons	"Sky Police"	Matt Selman	Fox	
2015 (68th)	The Simpsons	"Walking Big & Tall"	Michael Price	Fox	
2016 (69th)	BoJack Horseman	"Stop the Presses"	Joe Lawson	Netflix	
2016 (69th)	BoJack Horseman	"Fish Out of Water"	Elijah Aron & Jordan Young	Netflix	
2016 (69th)	Elena of Avalor	"First Day of Rule"	Craig Gerber	Disney Channel	
2016 (69th)	The Simpsons	"Barthood"	Dan Greaney	Fox	
2016 (69th)	Star Wars Rebels	"A Princess on Lothal"	Steven Melching	Disney XD	
2017 (70th)	BoJack Horseman	"Time's Arrow"	Kate Purdy	Netflix	
2017 (70th)	Bob's Burgers	"Brunchsquatch"	Lizzie Molyneux & Wendy Molyneux	Fox	
2017 (70th)	BoJack Horseman	"Ruthie"	Joanna Calo	Netflix	
2017 (70th)	The Simpsons	"A Father's Watch"	Simon Rich	Fox	
2017 (70th)	The Simpsons	"The Serfsons"	Brian Kelley	Fox	
2018 (71st)	The Simpsons	"Bart's Not Dead"	Stephanie Gillis	Fox	
2018 (71st)	Bob's Burgers	"Boywatch"	Rich Rinaldi	Fox	
2018 (71st)	Bob's Burgers	"Just One of the Boyz 4 Now for Now"	Lizzie Molyneux & Wendy Molyneux	Fox	
2018 (71st)	Bob's Burgers	"Mo Mommy, Mo Problems"	Steven Davis	Fox	
2018 (71st)	Family Guy	"Send in Stewie, Please"	Gary Janetti	Fox	
2018 (71st)	The Simpsons	"Krusty the Clown"	Ryan Koh	Fox	
2019 (72nd)	The Simpsons	"Thanksgiving of Horror"	Dan Vebber	Fox	
2019 (72nd)	Bob's Burgers	"Bed, Bob & Beyond"	Kelvin Yu	Fox	
2019 (72nd)	Bob's Burgers	"The Gene Mile"	Steven Davis	Fox	
2019 (72nd)	BoJack Horseman	"A Horse Walks Into A Rehab"	Elijah Aron	Netflix	
2019 (72nd)	The Simpsons	"Go Big or Go Homer"	John Frink	Fox	
2019 (72nd)	The Simpsons	"Livin La Pura Vida"	Brian Kelley	Fox	

=== 2020s ===
Year	Show	Episode	Writer(s)	Network	Ref.
2020 (73rd)	BoJack Horseman	"Xerox of a Xerox"	Nick Adams	Netflix	
2020 (73rd)	Bob's Burgers	"Prank You for Being a Friend"	Katie Crown	Fox	
2020 (73rd)	The Simpsons	"Bart the Bad Guy"	Dan Vebber	Fox	
2020 (73rd)	The Simpsons	"I, Carumbus"	Cesar Mazariegos	Fox	
2020 (73rd)	The Simpsons	"A Springfield Summer Christmas for Christmas"	Jessica Conrad	Fox	
2020 (73rd)	The Simpsons	"Three Dreams Denied"	Danielle Weisberg	Fox	
2021 (74th)	Tuca & Bertie	"Planteau"	Lisa Hanawalt	Adult Swim	
2021 (74th)	Bob's Burgers	"An Incon-Wheelie-ent Truth"	Dan Fybel	Fox	
2021 (74th)	Bob's Burgers	"Loft in Bedslation"	Jameel Saleem	Fox	
2021 (74th)	Family Guy	"Must Love Dogs"	Daniel Peck	Fox	
2021 (74th)	The Simpsons	"Portrait of a Lackey on Fire"	Rob LaZebnik & Johnny LaZebnik	Fox	
2021 (74th)	The Simpsons	"The Star of the Backstage"	Elisabeth Kiernen Averick	Fox	
2022 (75th)	Undone	"Rectify"	Elijah Aron & Patrick Metcalf	Amazon Prime Video	
2022 (75th)	Bob's Burgers	"To Bob, or Not to Bob"	Lizzie Molyneux-Logelin & Wendy Molyneux	Fox	
2022 (75th)	The Simpsons	"Girls Just Shauna Have Fun"	Jeff Westbrook	Fox	
2022 (75th)	The Simpsons	"Pixelated and Afraid"	John Frink	Fox	
2022 (75th)	The Simpsons	"The Sound of Bleeding Gums"	Loni Steele Sosthand	Fox	
2022 (75th)	Tuca & Bertie	"The Pain Garden"	Lisa Hanawalt	Adult Swim	
2023 (76th)	The Simpsons	"Carl Carlson Rides Again"	Loni Steele Sosthand	Fox	
2023 (76th)	Futurama	"I Know What You Did Next Xmas"	Ariel Ladensohn	Hulu	
2023 (76th)	The Simpsons	"A Mid-Childhood Night’s Dream"	Carolyn Omine	Fox	
2023 (76th)	The Simpsons	"Homer's Adventures Through the Windshield Glass"	Tim Long	Fox	
2023 (76th)	The Simpsons	"Thirst Trap: A Corporate Love Story"	Rob LaZebnik	Fox	
2024 (77th)	Bob's Burgers	"Saving Favorite Drive-In"	Katie Crown	Fox	
2024 (77th)	Blood of Zeus	"Winter Is Born"	Charles & Vlas Parlapanides	Netflix	
2024 (77th)	Bob's Burgers	"The Tina Table: The Tables have Tina-ed"	Greg Thompson	Fox	
2024 (77th)	The Simpsons	"Bottle Episode"	Rob & Johnny LaZebnik	Fox	
2024 (77th)	The Simpsons	"Cremains of the Day"	John Frink	Fox	
2024 (77th)	The Simpsons	"Night of the Living Wage"	Cesar Mazariegos	Fox	
2025 (78th)	Long Story Short	"Shira Can't Cook"	Mehar Sethi	Netflix	
2025 (78th)	Bob's Burgers	"Don't Worry, Be Hoopy"	Lindsey Stoddart	Fox	
2025 (78th)	Futurama	"Scared Screenless"	Bill Odenkirk	Hulu	
2025 (78th)	The Great North	"It's a Beef-derful Life"	Lizzie Molyneux-Logelin & Wendy Molyneux	Fox	
2025 (78th)	The Simpsons	"Abe League of Their Moe"	Joel H. Cohen	Fox	
2025 (78th)	The Simpsons	"Parahormonal Activity"	Loni Steele Sosthand	Fox	

== Total awards ==
- Fox – 17
- Netflix – 3
- Comedy Central – 1

== Programs with multiple awards ==
14 awards

- The Simpsons (Fox)

3 awards

- BoJack Horseman (Netflix)

2 awards

- Bob's Burgers (Fox)
- Futurama (Fox; Comedy Central)

== Programs with multiple nominations ==
69 nominations

- The Simpsons (Fox)

16 nominations

- Bob's Burgers (Fox)

9 nominations

- Futurama (Fox; Comedy Central; Hulu)

7 nominations

- King of the Hill (Fox)
- BoJack Horseman (Netflix)

3 nominations

- Family Guy (Fox)

== Writers with multiple wins ==
3 wins

- Joel H. Cohen
- Jeff Westbrook

2 wins

- Ken Keeler

== Writers with multiple nominations ==
8 nominations

- John Frink

7 nominations

- Matt Selman

5 nominations

- Joel H. Cohen
- Don Payne

4 nominations

- J. Stewart Burns
- Stephanie Gillis
- Rob LaZebnik
- Brian Kelley
- Lizzie Molyneux & Wendy Molyneux
- Michael Price
- Jeff Westbrook

3 nominations

- Elijah Aron
- Jim Dauterive
- Tim Long
- Carolyn Omine
- Patric Verrone

2 nominations

- Steven Davis
- Katie Crown
- Dan Fybel
- Lisa Hanawalt
- Ken Keeler
- Johnny LaZebnik
- Tony Gama-Lobo & Rebecca May
- Ian Maxtone-Graham
- Cesar Mazariegos
- Loni Steele Sosthand
- Greg Thompson
- Dan Vebber

== See also ==
- List of animation awards
