= Bart's in Jail! =

- The Simpsons episode
- Episode no.: Season 33; Episode 2
- Directed by: Steven Dean Moore
- Written by: Nick Dahan
- Production code: QABF18
- Original air date: October 3, 2021

Guest appearances
- Alan Cumming as Loki; Scott Hanson as "Punt Zone" Announcer; Alex Hirsch as Bill Cipher; Joel H. Cohen as Old Joel

Episode chronology
← Previous "The Star of the Backstage"	Next → "Treehouse of Horror XXXII"
- The Simpsons season 33

"Bart's in Jail!" is the second episode of the thirty-third season of the American animated television series The Simpsons, and the 708th episode overall. It aired in the United States on Fox on October 3, 2021. The episode was directed by Steven Dean Moore, and written by Nick Dahan.

In this episode, Grampa Simpson falls for a phone scam, so the Simpsons look for the location of the scammers. Alan Cumming, Scott Hanson, and Alex Hirsch guest starred. The episode received generally mixed reviews.

== Plot ==
Grampa receives an urgent phone call telling him that Bart is in jail and that he needs to get $10,000 to the "authorities" or Bart will face a massive prison sentence. Because Grampa not-unreasonably finds the notion of Bart being in jail to be plausible and also because he wants to help his grandson, he does wire the money, only to realize that he was the victim of a scam. Everyone except Homer feels bad for Grampa and consoles him with their own stories of being scammed.

When Homer learns that Grampa lost his $10,000 and that the money was planned as an inheritance for himself, he gets so angry that he keeps mocking and yelling at Grampa at length. Marge, Lisa and Bart finally get him to stop treating Grampa so badly over an honest mistake after Homer gets scammed himself and they all go over to the retirement home so Homer can apologize—and they are all there when another scammer calls in to try the same "(Person) In Jail" scam by using Lisa's name.

Lisa then gets an idea that involves Grampa using his talent of having long aimless conversations to keep the scammers talking until Lisa can use advanced computer software to pinpoint their location to a building in Shelbyville. The family heads there and finds out the place is a boiler room operation whose callers are not criminal masterminds but people (including Moe) working for minimum-wage gift cards. Chief Wiggum and his fellow police officers break up the ring, but Marge wonders if they really did any good considering how corrupt the entire world is. She later decides she will not let herself become that cynical, and gives a woman claiming to have left her wallet at home $20 to buy gas and her address to send it back. Some time later, Marge does get the money back in the post, and her faith in humanity is restored—as it is revealed that Grampa actually sent her the letter and the money, not wanting to see Marge's spirit be ruined by the scams around the world.

As the credits roll, Moe is shown using well-known scamming methods.

== Production ==
=== Development ===
The episode was written by writers assistant Nick Dahan. The scam in the plot was inspired by an incident involving Dahan's grandmother, who received a similar message. Writers Cesar Mazariegos, Christine Nangle, Ryan Koh, and Joel H. Cohen contributed to the episode. It was executive producer Matt Selman's idea not to give the story a happy ending.

Originally, at the end of the episode, it was revealed that Grampa had been cheating at cribbage for years to get the money that was taken by the scammer. There was also a deleted tag scene of Homer at a restaurant.

The producers reached out to Neil Gaiman for visual inspiration of Loki. Gaiman suggested they use Arthur Rackham's "Rhinemaidens" picture for inspiration.

=== Casting ===
Bill Cipher (who appears in the Loki hallucination) is voiced by Gravity Falls creator Alex Hirsch, who reprises his role from the series. His inclusion was an idea from Selman. Addressing the crossover on Twitter, Hirsch wrote, "From age 8-18 I didn’t miss a single Simpsons premiere. I read the guide until the pages fell out, memorized every line, knew the writer of each ep & could tell you the season by the size of the characters pupils. I’m in total disbelief that tonight I just did a cameo on the show." Hirsch continued on to say, "If tonight I get hit by 3 busses then lightning then fall out of a window into a truckload of mousetraps I’ll die happy. Thank you @TheSimpsons for inspiring me to get into animation in the first place & for this surreal honor."

Alan Cumming, who portrayed Loki in Son of the Mask, was cast as the voice of Loki, and NFL RedZone host Scott Hanson was cast as the "Punt Zone" announcer.

== Cultural references ==
Homer's dream is a reference to the 2019 film Knives Out with the Simpson family members dressed as the film's characters. The parody received an acknowledgement from the film's director Rian Johnson.

== Reception ==
=== Viewing figures ===
The episode earned a 0.52 rating and was watched by 1.48 million viewers, which was the highest-rated show on Animation Domination that night.

=== Critical response ===
Marcus Gibson of Bubbleblabber gave "Bart's in Jail!" an eight out of ten stating "Overall, 'Bart's in Jail' is not a scam. It's an enjoyable and reflective perspective on the perils of phone scams and their effects on people. Episodes like this continue to be one of the main reasons this show still has legs, and I hope they make more of them in the future."

Tony Sokol of Den of Geek gave the episode 2.5 out of 5 stars, stating "'Bart's in Jail!' feels like an allegory but is too specific. It is a timely issue, one which impacts quite a lot of people, and isn't constrained to online or phone scams, steak knives or waxy yellow buildup. But the episode is too sanitized for effective satire. Moe's reading of the closing is the high point of the episode. The overriding idea that everything is a scam, and even Grandpa thinks his family are suckers for believing him when he tries to restore Marge's faith, is vaguely subversive, but too judgmental."
