= Bart the Cool Kid =

- The Simpsons episode
- Episode no.: Season 33; Episode 15
- Directed by: Steven Dean Moore
- Written by: Ryan Koh
- Production code: UABF08
- Original air date: March 20, 2022

Guest appearances
- Michael Rapaport as Mike Wegman; The Weeknd as Orion Hughes and Darius Hughes; Kelly Macleod as "Duplicate Cop 2"

Episode chronology
← Previous "You Won't Believe What This Episode Is About – Act Three Will Shock You!"	Next → "Pretty Whittle Liar"
- The Simpsons season 33

"Bart the Cool Kid" is the fifteenth episode of the thirty-third season of the American animated television series The Simpsons, and the 721st episode overall. It aired in the United States on Fox on March 20, 2022. The episode was directed by Steven Dean Moore and written by Ryan Koh.

In this episode, Bart helps design a new pair of sneakers after he is humiliated when Homer gives him counterfeit ones while Homer and other middle-age men attempt to wear more fashionable clothes. Michael Rapaport and The Weeknd guest starred. The episode received positive reviews.

== Plot ==
Bart wants a pair of cool new limited-edition sneakers called Slipremes, which are promoted by a kid influencer named Orion Hughes. Homer goes to buy them, but is intimidated by the long wait and high price, instead purchasing bootlegs from his friend Mike Wegman. Bart is unaware, and when he wears them at school, they immediately fall apart. He goes to return them at the Slipreme store, only to be filmed and shamed by various storegoers. Homer catches up to Bart and tries to stop him, but accidentally rips his pants off, exposing his underpants. Humiliated and furious, Bart runs out of the store, and accuses Homer of being uncool. The day after, Orion visits Bart and brings him authentic Supreme merchandise as an apology gift.

Bart learns that Orion does not know how to skate, and begins teaching him. Orion, moved by the experience of having a genuine friendship rather than shilling products, designs a limited-edition "Bartman One" sneaker with him. Meanwhile, Homer wears a Slipreme coat and is complimented by Mike, boosting his confidence. Homer gives new clothes to his friends at Moe's, with the Slipreme style becoming popular among middle-aged adults. Bart and Orion fear that the brand is becoming uncool. That night, Bart confronts Homer, who plans to attend the Bartman One release party.

At the party, Bart and Orion nervously await the arrival of Homer and his middle-aged friends. Bart calls Marge, who arrives to reassure Homer that he should be himself, rather than feeling like he is someone better because of the clothes he wears. Homer deflects all the other adults into an aviation history museum, and Bart thanks him for saving the party and keeping the brand intact. However, the Bartman Ones are already sold out. Homer buys a pair of them from Mike, with a similar shoddy quality—however, this time, Bart is not bothered. Over the credits, Orion's father reveals that he is actually a clone, since he feared that he would never love a son as much as himself.

== Production ==
In 2020, while promoting the episode of American Dad! that he co-wrote and in which he guest starred, The Weeknd expressed interest in working on The Simpsons. He reached out to the producers, and they cast him as both Orion and his father, who both have similar qualities as The Weeknd. Michael Rapaport reprised his role as Mike Wegman in the same episode.

== Reception ==
=== Viewing figures ===
The episode earned a 0.29 rating and was watched by 1.04 million viewers, which was the second-most watched show on Fox that night.

=== Critical response ===
Tony Sokol of Den of Geek gave the episode a 4 out of 5 stars stating, "As Lisa points out, cool is arbitrary and constantly changing. The Simpsons used to be cool but changes in awkward growth spurts. The generational standoff deserves more than a speech from Marge and a trip to the Aviation Museum, but the last segment pushes ‘Bart the Cool Kid’ up a half star. It is completely out of left field, both as an added twist and as a concept in itself. It is funny, and ties all the little bits together like the laces on a really cool sneaker."

Marcus Gibson of Bubbleblabber gave the episode an 8 out of 10 stating, "Overall, ‘Bart the Cool Kid’ is another cool episode in the show's consistently strong season. It has a couple of pointless elements that kept it from reaching the top of its ‘popularity meter’. Despite that, the episode continues the strength of showcasing the show's relationship between father and son, even though the trends involving online influencers, gifs, and memes take a back seat most of the time."
