= The Longest Marge =

- The Simpsons episode
- Episode no.: Season 33; Episode 11
- Directed by: Matthew Nastuk
- Written by: Brian Kelley
- Production code: UABF05
- Original air date: January 2, 2022

Guest appearances
- Beck Bennett as Grayson Mathers; John Mulaney as Warburton Parker; Adam Schefter as himself

Episode chronology
← Previous "A Made Maggie"	Next → "Pixelated and Afraid"
- The Simpsons season 33

"The Longest Marge" is the eleventh episode of the thirty-third season of the American animated television series The Simpsons, and the 717th episode overall. It aired in the United States on Fox on January 2, 2022. The episode was directed by Matthew Nastuk and written by Brian Kelley.

In this episode, Mr. Burns hires the Springfield Atoms' newest football player to be the spokesman for his liquor brand and makes Marge care for him. Beck Bennett and John Mulaney guest starred. Sports journalist Adam Schefter appeared as himself. The episode received mixed reviews.

This episode is dedicated to John Madden, who appeared in the 1999 episode "Sunday, Cruddy Sunday". He died five days before the episode aired.

The episode was broadcast at 9:00 pm EST instead of the usual 8:00 pm EST slot. The title of the episode is a reference to the 2005 sports comedy The Longest Yard.

== Plot ==
At the Springfield Nuclear Power Plant, everyone is gone from their workplace, following the sports channel's On the Clock where Anger Watkins is presenting the Springfield Atoms's draft, picking Grayson Mathers. The workers start rioting in celebration, while Mr. Burns and Waylon Smithers review corporate revenue and discover that Burns' liquor company, Mr. Gentleman Brandy, is losing money due to their lackluster ad campaign.

To reinvent the brand, Burns hires branding expert Warburton Parker. Ultimately, Burns overhears the cheers for Grayson and hires him as the new face of the company. The Simpson family goes to the Springfield Atoms Stadium to watch the game against the Chargers, only to find that representing a liquor company has turned Grayson into a drunken wreck who can no longer play.

To rehabilitate his image, Grayson goes to Springfield Elementary to give an inspirational speech about literacy, but he breaks down after Nelson Muntz and his fellow bullies start heckling him; enraged, he starts throwing books at them. He chugs another bottle of brandy, which causes urethra pain so intense that he passes out. He wakes up in the infirmary, where Marge is taking care of him. Trying to protect his investment, Burns makes a deal with Marge in which she keeps Grayson sober and sane, while he takes care of Grayson's career.

Marge takes Grayson home for dinner with her family. Grayson says he has never really had a family, his parents having been absent from his life ever since they signed him to the NFL as a child, preferring to make money off of him rather than spend time with him. Marge invites him to stay with the family and starts teaching him how to live like a normal person, including weaning him off of drugs and alcohol.

Marge throws Grayson a party to celebrate his rehabilitation. Mr. Burns shows up and offers to take him out on the town, but Marge forbids Grayson to go out, reminding him that he has a game to play the following day. Grayson obeys Marge and stays in, and he scores a game-winning touchdown.

After the game, Burns gets into an argument with Marge, accusing her of turning Grayson into a mama's boy. Upset at witnessing the argument, Grayson leaves in his Ferrari and then sends Marge a ticket for the Sports Channel's annual awards show at The Draft Pigs Center for the Performing Arts. At the award show, she finds out she is seated next to Burns, also Grayson's guest, and realizes that Grayson is trying to reconcile them. Sure enough, when Grayson accepts the award for Most Inspiring Athlete, Marge and Burns start connecting instead of fighting.

At the end of his speech, Grayson thanks the person that inspired him - his fiancée Kaitlyn, whom he met three days earlier and made his business manager; Marge and Burns realize that Kaitlin has replaced them.

== Production ==
John Mulaney reprised his role as Warburton Parker. He previously appeared in this role in the thirty-first season episode "The Winter of Our Monetized Content." Sports writer Adam Schefter appeared as himself. Beck Bennett guest starred as Grayson Mathers.

The episode was dedicated in memory of football coach and sports commentator John Madden. Madden appeared in the tenth season episode "Sunday, Cruddy Sunday."

The episode aired in the 9:00 pm timeslot after the series premiere of Next Level Chef.

== Cultural references ==
When an opposing team loses to the Springfield Atoms, their players board a bus to join the Winnipeg Blue Bombers of the Canadian Football League. The Blue Bombers won the 108th Grey Cup the previous month. The Twitter account of the Blue Bombers acknowledged the nod after the episode aired.

At the Springfield Library, Marge gives out copies of children's books such as Captain Underpants, Diary of a Wimpy Kid, and Goosebumps.

When Marge and Burns find out that Grayson has arranged for them to sit together, she exclaims, "He Parent Trapped us!". This is a reference to the 1961 family comedy film The Parent Trap.

== Reception ==
=== Viewing figures ===
The episode was watched by 2.02 million viewers, scoring a 0.7 demo rating, which was the second-most watched show on Fox that night.

=== Critical response ===
Tony Sokol of Den of Geek gave the episode 3.5 stars out of five stating, "'The Longest Marge' ultimately plays too safe a game to do a victory dance in the end zone. It works on every level, but not quite hard enough. There are excellent individual gags, exchanges, and visual puns. The premise, promise and preface set up all the makings of a killer payoff, and then it cops out with a boozy Parent Trap scenario which doesn't quite satisfy. The installment almost pulls off a seditious treat when Grayson throws it all away for his trophy future wife Kaitlin, the guru of a faith-based yogurt yoga chain which you eat while doing yoga. It is only a tease, however, to the savage satire which could have been delivered. One Hail Mary pass should have done it."

Burkely Hermann of Bubbleblabber gave the episode 5.5 out of 10 stating, "It was a bit weird to have an episode where Bart nor Lisa has that many lines, with more lines by Homer and Marge than either of the kids. The guest stars, Beck Bennett (voicing Grayson Mathers), John Mulaney (voicing Warburton Parker), and Adam Schefter were a nice touch. I suppose I liked this episode, but I didn’t really laugh during it. The drama and story was good, but the comedy was dull. I hope that will improve in the future, although I’m not entirely sure it will."
