= The Wayz We Were =

- The Simpsons episode
- Episode no.: Season 33; Episode 4
- Directed by: Matthew Nastuk
- Written by: Joel H. Cohen
- Production code: QABF19
- Original air date: October 17, 2021

Guest appearances
- Trey Anastasio as himself; Pamela Reed as Ruth Powers

Episode features
- Couch gag: Stop-motion animation of the family as wooden figurines in a medieval castle, attempting to entertain "Princess Maggie".

Episode chronology
← Previous "Treehouse of Horror XXXII"	Next → "Lisa's Belly"
- The Simpsons season 33

"The Wayz We Were" is the fourth episode of the thirty-third season of the American animated television series The Simpsons, and the 710th episode overall. It aired in the United States on Fox on October 17, 2021. The episode was directed by Matthew Nastuk and written by Joel H. Cohen.

In this episode, Moe reunites with his former love Maya while the Simpsons deal with the traffic in their neighborhood. Pamela Reed guest starred as Ruth Powers. Musician Trey Anastasio appeared as himself. The episode received mixed reviews.

== Plot ==
Evergreen Terrace's street is overcome by a major traffic jam and everyone is miserable. Meanwhile, Moe Szyslak is sitting in his car waiting for the traffic to move when he sees a maroon car behind him and believes he remembers it from his past.

Later that night, the Simpson family call the entire neighborhood to discuss the traffic problem, and learn that the entire family is highly disliked due to their annoying antics. After realizing the neighborhood hates them, Homer promises to redeem themselves. Afterwards, he goes to Professor Frink and Frink digitally takes the street off the maps, thus getting rid of traffic on that street. The townspeople hail Homer as a hero, but he quickly gets annoyed by their praises.

Meanwhile, Moe finds the car behind him belongs to his former short girlfriend Maya, from "Eeny Teeny Maya Moe". Maya quickly asks Moe to get back together and he gladly accepts her back. The two spend a large amount of time at the bar and begin singing, but Moe worries Maya might leave him again just like every other girl in his life.

A grief stricken Moe then heads to Bart's treehouse in emotional pain. Homer then convinces Moe to leave the treehouse by telling him Maya loves him and she would never leave him. The two reconcile and kiss and Moe proposes to Maya, who happily accepts.

== Production ==
The couch gag, titled "All Hail Princess Maggie!," was created by Stoopid Buddy Stoodios. Produced with stop-motion animation and made entirely from wood, the gag was directed by John Harvatine IV and written by Tom Root.

Pamela Reed reprised her role as Ruth Powers. The character previously appeared in the fourth season episode "New Kid on the Block", the fifth season episode "Marge on the Lam", and the fourteenth season episode "The Strong Arms of the Ma". Musician Trey Anastasio appeared as himself. Anastasio previously appeared with his band Phish in the thirteenth season episode "Weekend at Burnsie's".

== Reception ==
=== Viewing figures ===
The viewing figures for this episode is 1.51 million and was the highest-rated show on Animation Domination that night.

=== Critical response ===
Marcus Gibson of Bubbleblabber gave the episode a 7.5 out of 10 stating "Overall, 'The Wayz We Were' wasn't as annoying as being stuck in an actual traffic jam. It is a funny and heartfelt episode that puts Moe's character growth in the spotlight. It would've been better off without the 'Homer solving the traffic jam' scenario as it didn't make much of an impact, in my opinion. Other than that, it's an enjoyable storyline that kicks off Moe's future with Maya."

Tony Sokol of Den of Geek gave the episode 2.5 out of 5 starts stating "'The Wayz We Were' is a tepid episode, which is only slightly warmed by the songs. It is also a sweet episode, which explores Moe's innermost turmoil, but it doesn't bring it to a boil, much less a simmer. Moe has sex in this installment and it's still not hot enough."
