= A Serious Flanders =

- The Simpsons episodes
- Promotional poster for the episodes
- Episode nos.: Season 33; Episodes 6 and 7
- Directed by: Debbie Bruce Mahan (Part 1); Matthew Faughnan (Part 2)
- Written by: Cesar Mazariegos
- Production codes: QABF21 (Part One); QABF22 (Part Two)
- Original air dates: November 7, 2021 (Part One); November 14, 2021 (Part Two)

Guest appearances
- Brian Cox as Kostas Becker; Joe Mantegna as Fat Tony (Part One only); Cristin Milioti as Barb; Chris O'Dowd as Seamus; Timothy Olyphant as Sheriff Flanders; Jessica Paré as Collette

Episode chronology
← Previous "Lisa's Belly"	Next → "Portrait of a Lackey on Fire"
- The Simpsons season 33

"A Serious Flanders" is a two-part episode of the American animated television series The Simpsons. It is the sixth and seventh episodes of the thirty-third season and the 712th and 713th episodes overall. Part One premiered on the Fox network in the United States on November 7, 2021, while Part Two premiered on November 14, 2021. Both parts are written by Cesar Mazariegos. Part One is directed by Debbie Mahan, while Part Two is directed by Matthew Faughnan.

The series' fourth two-part episode, it is a parody of prestige television and is set outside the series' normal continuity. Brian Cox, Cristin Milioti, Chris O'Dowd, Timothy Olyphant, and Jessica Paré guest starred. Both parts received overwhelmingly positive reception from critics, with some citing both of them as being one of the best episodes to happen in the last decade of the show. The title is a reference to the 2009 film A Serious Man, while the plot is inspired by television series Fargo, as well as the continued rise of prestige premium drama on cable and streaming. The introduction featuring the "Simpflix" streaming service is a parody of Netflix.

== Plot ==
=== Part 1 ===
The Rich Texan attempts to escape from a ruthless debt collector named Kostas Becker and his henchmen Seamus and Collette, but Kostas captures him, murders him, and slices his face off for not paying his debt.

Later, Homer and Ned Flanders are collecting trash in the park when Ned stumbles down a snowy hill and finds a bag containing exactly $173,296 in cash, which he donates to a local orphanage in the name of his grandfather, Sheriff Ned Flanders. Kostas finds out that Ned is the grandson of the former Sheriff, whom he killed over a debt. Kostas finds Ned at church and demands that he retrieve the money. Ned takes Barb, the director of the orphanage, on a date to a Christmas festival, and they return to her home to make out, but Ned leaves in disgust upon learning Barb is in an open marriage with Sideshow Mel.

Homer is captured by Seamus and Collette after they mistake him for Ned. Knowing they have captured the wrong man, Kostas calls Ned and threatens to kill Homer if Ned calls the police. Marge asks Ned if he knows where Homer is, but Ned lies and tells her that Homer left for Shelbyville.

Marge looks for Homer around Springfield and ends up at Lard Lad's donut shop while Kostas is eating breakfast there. After Seamus and Collette attack Comic Book Guy; Fat Tony and his minions Johnny Tightlips, Legs, and Louie confront Kostas and demand that he leave Springfield, but Kostas single-handedly kills them, which also results in the deaths of Disco Stu and Mr. Burns. Kostas spares Marge and leaves, but drops Homer's work ID on his way out, and Marge realizes Kostas has kidnapped Homer.

While Kostas tortures Homer, Ned prays at church, horrified at himself for the debt, for risking Homer's life and for making out with Barb.

=== Part 2 ===
After the Lard Lad massacre, the Springfield police search for Kostas while Marge searches for Homer. Meanwhile, Ned worries that the debt collectors will kill Homer, and wonders where the money originally came from.

In a flashback, it is revealed that the corrupt Sheriff Flanders took bribes from the Capital City mafia and was a frequent nightclub patron and drug user. One night while the mafia were negotiating with the Szyslak brothers over money taken by the then-collector Kostas, the two groups engaged in a gunfight that killed all but one. The Sheriff shot the last man and hid the money in a tree, but when Kostas demanded the money back, he accidentally killed the Sheriff who slid right into his knife. The police arrived and accidentally crashed a car into the tree, knocking it down the hill.

Back in the present, Homer discovers that Seamus and Collette are married and celebrating their tenth anniversary. After Homer tricks them into arguing, a pot on the stove catches fire and spreads through the house and eventually causing Seamus and Collette to get crushed to death by a bathtub falling through the upper floor. While Marge saves Homer from the wreckage, Ned breaks into Barb's orphanage to steal the money back, and seduces her to get the key to the safe. Ned drives away with the money and passes by an escaped Homer, which causes Ned to crash his car which catches on fire. Homer saves Ned by pulling him out of the burning car with the money. While Ned goes into hiding, the townsfolk hail Homer as a hero for recovering the money for the orphanage, but Marge, knowing Homer actually meant to pull out the money for himself instead of saving Ned, becomes ashamed of him.

Three years later, Homer and Marge own a car repair shop but their marriage is still strained. Bart is a well-behaved Boy Scout, and Lisa now has several friends. After receiving a blank postcard from Wyoming, Homer travels there to visit Ned, who is hiding out in a cabin in the woods, to deliver him supplies. Marge secretly follows Homer, and finally sees him as a decent man when she sees him helping Ned. Unfortunately, Kostas followed her and ambushes them. They escape from the cabin, and Ned fights Kostas on a frozen lake where Kostas reveals to Ned his grandfather's dark secrets, causing an enraged Ned to attack Kostas. Ned throws his debt book onto the frozen lake, and Kostas goes to retrieve it, which causes the ice to break, and he falls in and drowns. After returning home to Springfield, Homer tells the townsfolk the entire story and Ned's reputation is restored while Homer and Marge finally reconcile.

== Production ==
QABF21 was announced on December 7, 2020, under the title of "A Serious Flanders". QABF22 received a table read on December 17, 2020, but executive producer Al Jean chose not to reveal the title or any details on it. It had been kept secret for nearly three months, before Cesar Mazariegos finally announced it to be "A Serious Flanders: Part 2" in March 2021 after having been asked on Twitter, revealing that the final two episodes of the QABF production line are a two-parter. Meanwhile, "A Serious Flanders" was renamed, with "Part 1" now added in the title.

Executive producer Matt Selman wanted to create a parody of prestige television, including elements of flashbacks and time jumps. To further the parody, the episode was expanded to two parts to mimic the slower pace. Selman also stated that the episode takes place outside the normal continuity of the show to allow for deaths of characters. Both parts were written by Cesar Mazariegos. Part One was directed by Debbie Bruce Mahan, while Part Two was directed by Matthew Faughnan.

The guest cast for the episode included actors who have appeared on prestige television series. Brian Cox, who starred on Succession, guest starred as Kostas Becker. Cristin Milioti, who appeared in the second season of Fargo, played Barb. Chris O'Dowd, who starred on Get Shorty, played Seamus. Jessica Paré, who starred on Mad Men, appeared as Collette.

In October 2021, Fox released promotional images for both parts. On November 2, 2021, the official poster was revealed. Sneak peeks for Part 1 were released by Fox on November 3, while sneak peeks for Part 2 were released on November 9.

== Reception ==
=== Viewing figures ===
Leading out of an NFL doubleheader, the first part earned a 1.15 rating and was watched by 3.47 million viewers, which was the most watched show on Fox that night. The second part earned a 0.49 rating and was watched by 1.66 million viewers, which was the most watched show on Fox that night.

=== Part 1 reception ===
Tony Sokol of Den of Geek gave the Part One episode 5 out of 5 stars stating, "'A Serious Flanders', written by Cesar Mazariegos, and directed by Debbie Mahan, is an installment even non-Simpsons watchers will like. It is detailed, nuanced, and overloaded with jokes or their ghosts. Because the rules of character continuity are suspended, Part II should provide a satisfying conclusion."

Marcus Gibson of Bubbleblabber gave the Part One episode an 8 out of 10, stating, "Overall, part one of 'A Serious Flanders' started the bloody two-part event on the right foot. From its comedy to the guest stars, the episode proves that no good deed goes unpunished. It would be interesting to see how they will follow that up in part two next week. Until then, all we can do now is pray that Flanders would find a way out of this deadly predicament."

Liz Shannon Miller of Consequence thought the first part was "a big swing." She highlighted the interactions between the guest characters and the regular characters. She also stated that she was looking forward to the next part for the first time in decades.

=== Part 2 reception ===
Tony Sokol of Den of Geek gave the Part Two episode 5 out of 5 stars stating, "'A Serious Flanders (Part Two)' was written by Cesar Mazariegos, and directed by Matthew Faughnan. It continues the pace and excellence of the first part, which only edges it out in enjoyability because it was surprisingly novel. For a series which has run for 33 seasons, this is an achievement in itself. The Simpsons have been inconsistent in the past few years. They've given quite a few excellent episodes, but have been tossing away too many feeble entries, trying to maintain a balance between irreverence and respect. Fargo only changes names out of respect for the dead. This two-parter is a classic, and sets a high bar for the season."

Marcus Gibson of Bubbleblabber gave Part Two an 8 of 10 stating "Overall, part two of 'A Serious Flanders' is a solid conclusion to the latest Simpsons two-part event. Despite its plot shortages involving Ned and his father, the episode has enough laughs and intrigue to deliver a worthy challenge for Ned's Christian beliefs. In conclusion, I would say that 'A Serious Flanders' is another satisfying two-part episode from The Simpsons. It's far from perfect, but it serves as an example of how the show can properly provide character development and situations in more than just one episode."

Alan Sepinwall of Rolling Stone named the two-part episode one of the best television episodes of 2021.
