= J. Michael Mendel =

American television producer (1964–2019)

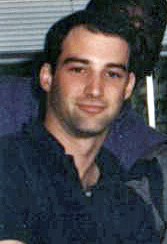
- Mendel, circa 1992
- Born: Joel Michael Mendel; September 24, 1964; Radford, Virginia, U.S.
- Died: September 22, 2019 (aged 54); Los Angeles, California, U.S.
- Education: Syracuse University (BS)
- Occupations: Television producer; associate producer; production assistant
- Years active: 1984–2019
- Spouse: Juel Bestrop
- Children: 2
- Parents: Jack Mendel (father); Rita Mendel (mother)

Joel Michael Mendel (September 24, 1964 – September 22, 2019) was an American television producer. He was a five-time Emmy Award winner for his work on The Simpsons and Rick and Morty.

== Career ==
Mendel first worked in television as a production assistant on All My Children and Loving during his summer breaks from studies at Syracuse University. After graduating Syracuse with a Bachelor of Science in television and film production, he worked with James L. Brooks and Gracie Films on Broadcast News, Big, and The Tracey Ullman Show. When Tracey Ullman's The Simpsons shorts were spun off into their own series, Mendel joined its staff as the show's producer, serving from season 1 to season 10. For his work on The Simpsons, Mendel won three Primetime Emmy Awards for Outstanding Animated Program in 1995 ("Lisa's Wedding"), 1997 ("Homer's Phobia"), and 1998 ("Trash of the Titans").

After departing The Simpsons, Mendel produced shows such as The PJs, The Oblongs, Drawn Together, Sit Down, Shut Up, and Napoleon Dynamite. In 2013, he joined Rick and Morty, where he won his fourth Emmy Award for the episode "Pickle Rick" in 2018. He won a posthumous Emmy in 2020 for the episode "The Vat of Acid Episode".

== Personal life ==
Mendel attended Monroe-Woodbury High School in Central Valley, New York. A resident of Studio City, Los Angeles, he was married to Juel Bestrop, a casting director for the series Brooklyn Nine-Nine and Life in Pieces, and had two children.

Mendel died from natural causes at his home in Los Angeles on September 22, 2019. His death has been described as "unexpected".

== Legacy ==
Tributes were made to him by Justin Roiland and Al Jean. "The Winter of Our Monetized Content", the 31st season premiere of The Simpsons, was dedicated to his memory, as was the 4th season premiere and the entirety of Season 6 of Rick and Morty, as well as the pilot episode of Solar Opposites.

== Filmography ==
=== Television ===
Year	Show	Role
1984–1986	All My Children	Production assistant
1984–1986	Loving	Production assistant
1987–1989	The Tracey Ullman Show	Production assistant
1989–1999	The Simpsons	Producer; Co-producer; Associate producer
1994–1995	The Critic	Producer
1999–2000	The PJs	Producer
2001	The Oblongs	Producer
2003	The Pitts	Associate producer
2003	Kid Notorious	Producer
2004–2007	Drawn Together	Producer
2007	Lil' Bush	Producer
2009	Sit Down, Shut Up	Producer
2011	Good Vibes	Line producer
2012	Napoleon Dynamite	Producer
2013–2021	Rick and Morty	Producer (posthumous release from 2019–21)
2020–2021	Solar Opposites	Producer (posthumous release)

=== Film ===
Year	Show	Role
1987	Broadcast News	Production assistant
1988	Big	Production assistant
1996	Jerry Maguire	Associate producer
