= My Octopus and a Teacher =

- The Simpsons episode
- Episode no.: Season 33; Episode 18
- Directed by: Rob Oliver
- Written by: Carolyn Omine
- Production code: UABF11
- Original air date: April 24, 2022

Guest appearance
- Kerry Washington as Ms. Peyton

Episode features
- Chalkboard gag: "I will not express my feelings through chaos" (at end of episode)

Episode chronology
← Previous "The Sound of Bleeding Gums"	Next → "Girls Just Shauna Have Fun"
- The Simpsons season 33

"My Octopus and a Teacher" is the eighteenth episode of the thirty-third season of the American animated television series The Simpsons, and the 724th episode overall. It aired in the United States on Fox on April 24, 2022. The episode was directed by Rob Oliver and written by Carolyn Omine. It is the first appearance of Bart's new teacher Ms. Peyton, and the first episode of the show to guest star Kerry Washington as Peyton.

In this episode, Bart acts awkwardly around his new teacher while Lisa secretly keeps an octopus after she protects it from a shark. The episode received positive reviews.

== Plot ==
Lisa breaks the prime directive of nature documentary filmmaking when she stops a shark from eating a small octopus named Molly. She secretly keeps her new octopus friend in her room only for Molly to keep escaping.

Meanwhile, Bart starts acting strangely when new teacher Ms. Peyton takes over his classroom, confusing not only her but everybody around him. He even makes an impressive diorama for Peyton only for Milhouse to produce a replica of his work, causing Bart to destroy both their projects in frustration. Marge eventually makes Homer talk to Bart causing Homer to suggest that Bart has a crush on Peyton. Bart confesses that while Lisa was filming her documentary on the beach, he used a bucket he found in the sand to get into a nearby hotel where he indulged in desserts, and when he went to swim in the pool, he started to drown. Peyton saved Bart, however after seeing all the people in the hotel looking at him he became embarrassed and acted ungrateful. Though he denies having a crush on Peyton, Bart goes to school, sees Peyton with her husband and realizes that Homer was right.

A concerned Lisa takes Molly to school to keep an eye on her, but soon overhears Homer advising Bart to let his crush on Peyton go. Homer's words get through to Lisa, who resolves to take Molly back to the sea. But Bart screams into Molly's jar in frustration, causing her to latch on to his face, resulting in him blindly retracting the bleachers and causing an accident that destroys the school's art presentation, humiliating Peyton in front of the teachers. A remorseful Bart confesses to Peyton that he was the boy she saved at the hotel. When he admits he has a crush on her, she suggests that he is beginning to like a new artistic and studious part of himself that is developing through her teaching. She resolves to stay at the school to teach Bart and help him improve, much to his relief.

In the tag scene, Lisa releases Molly back into the sea, but does save her from the shark one last time by tossing him elsewhere.

== Production ==
After the death of Marcia Wallace, Al Jean thought that Bart may not get a new permanent teacher given how public schools work. At the same time, Carolyn Omine had been eying a role for Kerry Washington since 2013. When Washington took to Twitter to ask for an animated role in 2020, Matt Selman reached out to offer the role of Bart's new permanent teacher. The plan would be for Washington to voice Peyton as often as Wallace voiced Edna Krabappel.

== Reception ==
=== Viewing figures ===
The episode scored a 0.3 rating and 0.97 million total viewers, making it the most watched show on Fox that night.

=== Critical response ===
Tony Sokol of Den of Geek gave the episode a 4 out of 5 stars stating, "’My Octopus and a Teacher’ tells an original story which brings depth to the entire Springfield school system, broadens Homer’s fatherly input, and teaches Lisa a new lesson. Bart goes from ‘angry drowning boy’ to having a crush on myself, because of a teacher. He is also reunited with his signature punishment, filling a chalkboard with ‘I will not express my feelings through chaos’ promises. ‘My Octopus and a Teacher’ is an altogether sweet, but not sappy, episode, but don’t expect Rayshelle Peyton to replace Miss Krabapple."

Marcus Gibson of Bubbleblabber gave the episode an 7.5/10 stating, "Overall, ‘My Octopus and a Teacher’ serves as a decent piece of character development for Bart that sees him loving himself and his new teacher. The introduction of Ms. Peyton, voiced wonderfully by Kerry Washington, also helped provide more diversity both on the show and in the voice cast. Additionally, Lisa’s B-plot involving her friendship with a cephalopod is a cute albeit formulaic little distraction from Bart’s complicated situation. I’m not sure when we’ll see this relationship between student and teacher continue, but based on my experience with this episode, I hope that’s soon."
