= Treehouse of Horror XXXII =

- The Simpsons episode
- Promotional poster
- Episode no.: Season 33; Episode 3
- Directed by: Matthew Faughnan
- Written by: John Frink
- Production code: QABF16
- Original air date: October 10, 2021

Guest appearances
- Susan Egan as "You'll Never Sleep Again" Singer; Maurice LaMarche as Vincent Price; Tree Rollins as himself

Episode features
- Chalkboard gag: "I hate rhyming couplets"

Episode chronology
← Previous "Bart's in Jail!"	Next → "The Wayz We Were"
- The Simpsons season 33

"Treehouse of Horror XXXII" is the third episode of the thirty-third season of the American animated television series The Simpsons, and the 709th episode overall. It aired in the United States on Fox on October 10, 2021, and unlike the previous season, aired at the appropriate time (prior to Halloween) to avoid conflict with Major League Baseball’s post-season, which stretched into November (the 2021 World Series went six of seven games). The episode was directed by Matthew Faughnan and written by John Frink.

In this episode, Bart and his mother run from a hunter, the Simpsons work for a wealthy family, a tree comes to life, Maggie is told a scary story about Bart, and Lisa investigates when her classmates die. Susan Egan and Maurice LaMarche guest starred. Former basketball player Tree Rollins appeared as himself. The episode received mixed reviews.

== Plot ==
Unlike the other Treehouse of Horror episodes, this is the first in the series that consists of five segments instead of the usual three.

=== Barti ===
The opening segment parodies Bambi, with a deer version of Marge Simpson warning her son Barti (Bart Simpson) and Milhouse Van Houten about a hunter. Milhouse is shot and killed while Barti and Marge run away. After his escape, Barti initially cannot find his mother, but later finds her unharmed as Homer and Lenny Leonard have killed the hunter (Mr. Burns). The fairy (Maggie) then uses her magic wand to make the episode's title appear in the sky.

=== Bong Joon Ho's 'This Side of Parasite' ===
In a parody of Parasite, the Simpson family are living in a flooded basement apartment when Bart tells them he's gotten a job as a tutor for Rainier Wolfcastle's wealthy family. After Rainier fires Kirk Van Houten from his household staff, Bart recommends hiring Marge, Homer, Lisa and Maggie as the family's new servants. The Wolfcastles go on vacation, leaving the Simpsons alone with their house. As they are enjoying the perks of living in a rich family's home, Kirk suddenly returns and asks to be let in. When Marge lets him in, Kirk abruptly runs to the kitchen and reveals a hidden passageway to a basement bunker, where his family has been living. A chaotic, class-driven fight breaks out between the Simpsons and Van Houtens, which soon breaks out among most of the other impoverished Springfielders. After the brawl, the Simpson family are the last ones standing in the badly damaged Wolfcastle house with a pile of corpses now in the living room.

=== Nightmare on Elm Tree ===
Homer is tired of Bart telling scary stories on Halloween in his treehouse every year, so Homer chops it down. The tree trunk is struck by lightning and comes to life. After the tree finds out people chop down trees for Christmas, it brings other trees and plants to life and they ravage Springfield and kill most of its residents. The trees celebrate while the townspeople's corpses have been stacked like a Christmas tree.

=== Poetic Interlude (aka The Telltale Bart) ===
In a parody of the artwork of Edward Gorey, Vincent Price reads a scary bedtime story to Maggie about how Bart is doing his usual pranks and mischief.

He begins with each month and how he creates trouble for everyone first starting off with January where he puts worms in Homer's waffles.

In February, he catfishes Edna Krabappel which he did back in season 3.

In March, he unscrews the swings and causes several injuries.

In April, he prints his butt on a printer.

In May, he steals Skinner's car and crashes it into the school pole.

In June, he takes his first sip of beer and crashes his bike.

In July, he cuts Lisa's doll heads off.

In August, he attempts to scorch a turtle, but instead manages to scorch his hair.

In September, he spends the whole month in detention.

In October, he eats all his Halloween candy until he gets sick.

Finally in November, he is allowed to cut the turkey during Thanksgiving but instead he cuts the rest of the Simpson family's heads off.

Before Vincent can get to December, Maggie strangles him with her Phonics frog string and presses the buttons (R-I-P) and then goes to sleep.

=== Dead Ringer ===
In a parody of The Ring, at Springfield Elementary, Sherri and Terri tell Lisa they had a party and didn't invite her, and all watched a TikTok that allegedly kills anyone who watches it after seven days. All of the children who watched it die shortly thereafter, and Lisa and Bart investigate its origin. They find out from Groundskeeper Willie that the TikTok is haunted by the ghost of Mopey Mary, a girl who didn't receive any valentines on Valentine's Day and died after falling down a well. Lisa watches the TikTok and summons the ghost of Mary, who attacks Lisa but stops when Lisa gives her a valentine. Lisa and Mary become friends, but Mary begins to feel smothered by Lisa and escapes by jumping back down the well.

Kang and Kodos sing at the end of this "Treehouse of Horror" episode.

The end credits are red instead of their usual yellow or white color or green color just like in the previous Treehouse of Horror credits.

== Reception ==
=== Viewing figures ===
The viewing figures for this episode is 3.96 million and was the highest-rated show on Animation Domination that night.

=== Critical response ===
Marcus Gibson of Bubbleblabber gave the episode an eight out of ten stating "Overall, the 32nd 'Treehouse of Horror' special continues the show's tradition of scaring and tickling our funny bones. It may not reach the heights of the earlier 'Treehouse of Horror' specials, but it's an enjoyable set of creepy mini-stories that'll put every Simpsons fan into the Halloween spirit this year. Out of the five segments shown in this special, I liked the Parasite parody the most because of its humor and unexpected ending. I enjoyed The Simpsons, and I loved Parasite. It's a winning combination, in my eyes."

Tony Sokol of Den of Geek stated "There are a lot of low-ball jokes here, but nothing which really slices. This has nothing to do with cancel culture, heightened sensitivities, or political stances, all of which should be exempt in the creation of any horror comedy satire. It is because the jokes, which come rapidly, are only lobbed. They should be spit balls, thrown with malicious intent, and close enough on the inside to make the batter back off in fear. Instead, the jokes walk, and not in a good zombie way, but more like the most recent episodes of The Walking Dead."
