= Portrait of a Lackey on Fire =

- The Simpsons episode
- Episode no.: Season 33; Episode 8
- Directed by: Steven Dean Moore
- Written by: Rob LaZebnik; Johnny LaZebnik
- Production code: UABF01
- Original air date: November 21, 2021

Guest appearances
- Christine Baranski as herself; Victor Garber as Michael de Graaf; Christian Siriano as himself

Episode features
- Couch gag: A pair of live-action hands cuts a potato open using a Swiss Army Knife, carves a face on it and uses it as a stamp to resemble the Simpsons.

Episode chronology
← Previous "A Serious Flanders"	Next → "Mothers and Other Strangers"
- The Simpsons season 33

"Portrait of a Lackey on Fire" is the eighth episode of the thirty-third season of the American animated television series The Simpsons, and the 714th episode overall. It aired in the United States on Fox on November 21, 2021. The episode was directed by Steven Dean Moore and written by Rob LaZebnik and Johnny LaZebnik. Its title is a reference to the French film Portrait of a Lady on Fire (2019).

In this episode, Smithers falls in love with a fashion designer, who builds a manufacturing plant in Springfield with poor working conditions. Victor Garber guest starred as Michael de Graaf. Actress Christine Baranski and designer Christian Siriano appeared as themselves. The episode received positive reviews.

== Plot ==
Homer notices Waylon Smithers' loneliness and offers to play matchmaker for him. When a jetsetting fashion designer mogul named Michael de Graaf arrives at Mr. Burns' mansion to adopt a puppy born from one of Burns' attack hounds, Homer introduces him to Smithers and the two are immediately attracted to each other. They become a couple, and Smithers is the happiest he has ever been in his life.

During a party thrown for the couple by Marge, Michael announces he is opening his new manufacturing plant in Springfield, opening multiple job positions to the town. During a tour of the factory, Homer, Bart, and Lisa discover sweatshop working conditions and the toxic waste from the factory polluting the environment.

Realizing that Michael is fully aware of this, Homer reluctantly shows Smithers the damaging effects of Michael's business. Smithers grapples with this information, asking Burns for advice, only to be told that "fast fashion" is an even more evil industry than nuclear power, and that Michael is effectively a supervillain. Burns advises Smithers to marry Michael to be set for life.

Smithers tries to plead with Michael to change his ways, but Michael has no plans of changing his business practices. Smithers is about to reluctantly accept Michael's offer to stay in the relationship whilst overlooking his flaws and forgetting his own moral compass, but after seeing Michael mistreat his doberman puppy, Smithers breaks up with him. Michael leaves on his jet, and an initially heartbroken Smithers discovers that Michael left the puppy behind. He happily adopts him, realizing that the puppy will offer him unconditional love and companionship, which is what he wanted most in a relationship. Smithers' profile pic of him with the puppy sparks a lot of interest on his dating app.

== Production ==
=== Development ===
The script was written by the screenwriting duo, Rob LaZebnik and his son Johnny, who is also gay. This is the first episode that Johnny has worked on, while Rob has written more than fifteen episodes of The Simpsons before the release of this episode. Johnny described his experience writing the script for The Simpsons as "spectacular and fulfilling." After Smithers came out and had his first relationship in the twenty-seventh season episode "The Burns Cage," executive producer Matt Selman thought it was time for another romance. The show no longer had Smithers focusing on Mr. Burns, and Selman wanted to see what Smithers wanted.

The couch gag was made by Katrin von Niederhäusern and Janine Wiget. Von Niederhäusern and Wiget first came to the producers' attention after they created a live-action shot-by-shot remake of the eating montage from the twenty-ninth season episode "Lisa Gets the Blues."

=== Casting ===
The role of Smithers' boyfriend Michael was also voiced by gay actor Victor Garber. Selman described Michael as someone tired of people in the fashion world and wanted a regular man from middle America. Actress Christine Baranski guest starred as herself. Fashion designer Christian Siriano also guest starred as himself.

== Reception ==
=== Viewing figures ===
In its original broadcast, the episode was watched by 3.97 million viewers and was the highest-rated show on Animation Domination that night.

=== Critical response ===
Tony Sokol of Den of Geek gave the episode a 4.5 out of 5 stars stating, "The innuendo-laden repartee with his boss, Mr. Burns, includes some of the cleverest writing of the series. In earlier seasons, Smithers' personal life barely intruded into the office, unless you had to get past his network firewall to see his introductory screensaver. Here he is gifted with the most fashionable accessory, a fully realized episode. Highlighted episodes keep Mr. Burns young, Grampa Simpson old, and Gil Gunderson employed. Smithers' portrayal has been an evolution, slowly unthreading from the fabric of executive material. 'Portrait of a Lackey on Fire' is clever, empathic and bittersweet. It panders, but in unexpected ways which keep the humor coming regularly, but never uniformly. The episode works more as a character study than a joke-fest, but the character is ultimately Springfield, not Smithers, and Springfield is no Milwaukee."

Marcus Gibson of Bubbleblabber gave the episode a 7.5 out of 10, stating, "The comedy delivered a couple of chuckle-worthy moments to keep this relationship smooth and steady without suffering from tasteless schlock."

KT Hawbaker of The A.V. Club praised the episode for treating Smithers like the other heterosexual characters. Hawbaker credits the writing duo for making fun of Smithers without treating him as less than human. Hawbaker also points out that the townsfolk acknowledge Smithers' sexuality as normal and are supportive of him.

=== Awards and nominations ===
Writers Rob LaZebnik and Johnny LaZebnik were nominated for a Writers Guild of America Award for Television: Animation for this episode at the 74th Writers Guild of America Awards.
