= Lisa's Belly =

- The Simpsons episode
- Episode no.: Season 33; Episode 5
- Directed by: Timothy Bailey
- Written by: Juliet Kaufman
- Production code: QABF20
- Original air date: October 24, 2021

Guest appearance
- Renee Ridgeley as Dr. Wendy Sage

Episode chronology
← Previous "The Wayz We Were"	Next → "A Serious Flanders"
- The Simpsons season 33

"Lisa's Belly" is the fifth episode of the thirty-third season of the American animated television series The Simpsons, and the 711th episode overall. It aired in the United States on Fox on October 24, 2021. The episode was directed by Timothy Bailey and written by Juliet Kaufman.

In this episode, Marge and Lisa visit a hypnotherapist after Marge accidentally makes Lisa insecure about her weight. Renee Ridgeley voiced Dr. Wendy Sage. The episode received positive reviews.

== Plot ==
At an abandoned water park (a parody of Action Park), Bart and Lisa contract a bizarre infection, requiring treatment from steroids that cause temporary weight gain. Before they go back to school, Marge calls Lisa "chunky" with affection, which causes her to be insecure about her weight. Marge takes Lisa to the mall, shopping for back-to-school clothes to make her feel better. She later says "flattering", making the word "chunky" grow bigger in Lisa's mind. Lisa gets cranky in front of the customers and workers, so Marge takes her home.

Hearing of the incident, Homer asks Lisa what is wrong and is horrified when she tells him Marge called her "chunky". He lets Patty and Selma take Lisa to the park where they describe how they no longer care what people think of them. Later, Marge apologizes to Lisa about what she said to her, but says words like "Normal" and "Perfect" to Lisa, making "chunky" grow bigger and causing her more frustration. In the piano store, Luann tells Marge about a hypnotherapist named Dr. Wendy Sage, who had a mastectomy and chose not to have breast reconstruction surgery.

Lisa and Marge visit Sage, who uses hypnotherapy on them, transferring them to Lisa's mind. They see the "chunky" word which takes up the entire space of her mind. They then travel to Marge's mind, where they discover that Marge's mother had said a hurtful word to her as a child: "plain". The word has been in her head for years. Realizing each other's insecurities, Marge and Lisa profess their love to each other, thus making "chunky" and "plain" shrink.

Meanwhile, when Bart's sleeve rips while playing basketball, Jimbo, Dolph, Kearney, and Nelson take him to an underground basement in school where they teach him to get into shape and become a man. When Bart sees the guys hanging around with their girlfriends, he feels betrayed, runs away from the basement and plays basketball with the other children.

During the credits, it is shown that there are words in everyone else's heads. Homer is shown as a child sleeping in a hammock with the many words he heard as a child (Lazy, dumb, stupid, fat, greedy) scattered around him. The scene changes to him as an adult, sleeping in the hammock, and the words have been replaced with empty beer cans and two jars of peanut butter in his hands.

== Development ==
The character of Wendy Sage was created and voiced by Renee Ridgeley, an actress, writer, and real-life breast cancer survivor and the wife of Simpsons writer Matt Selman who said: “While Sage has all the telltale signs of a breast cancer survivor: a visible scar from a port-o-cath (a device used to deliver chemotherapy), curly hair regrowing from chemo treatment, an obviously one-breasted appearance, and is visually concave on her mastectomy side, the episode does not focus on her past disease.'' "Sage shows up as exactly who she is now," she added. "By living openly as a one-breasted woman, she sends a message of acceptance and wholeness celebrated by individuals in marginalized groups."

== Reception ==
=== Viewing figures ===
The viewing figures for this episode is 1.83 million and was the highest-rated show on Animation Domination that night.

=== Critical response ===
Wendy Sage has been very well received by fans of The Simpsons.

Tony Sokol of Den of Geek gave the episode 4 out of 5 stars, stating "'Lisa's Belly' works because her healing and acceptance comes from the most unlikely of places. Homer, Patty and Selma are what they are and don't care how other people see them. This is valuable and the message is much more effective coming from them. This is a very sweet, and mature episode. It is just such a shame what happens to the Powerpuff Girls." Regarding the character of Wendy Sage, he wrote "The hypnotherapist, Dr. Wendy Sage, voiced by Renee Ridgeley, actually provides the strongest non-verbal message. She is obviously a breast cancer survivor who has taken control of how she defines herself, proudly uni-boob, which is subliminally as effective as her spinny thing. The hypnosis session itself breaks the walls between Lisa and Marge, but this time it’s their attitude which could use adjustment, having nothing to do with body issues. Lisa thinks hypnosis is a little “woo-woo,” scientifically, and the word which has been lodged so uncomfortably in Sage's subconscious is “quack.” This has two meanings as well. It is the word skeptics use to describe the wacky world of mental health professionals, but it's also the thing hypnotists are supposed to make their clients do after the most clichéd sessions. This makes her as universal a victim of bad words as any major character."

Marcus Gibson of Bubbleblabber gave the episode an 8 out of 10, stating "Overall, 'Lisa's Belly' continues the show's strength in delivering humorous yet relatable stories that deal with current issues. This is another episode that provided a healthy balance between comedy and drama in terms of representing real-life problems and mental health. No amount of harmful words can stop this season from chugging along smoothly."
