= Boyz N the Highlands =

- The Simpsons episode
- Episode no.: Season 33; Episode 13
- Directed by: Bob Anderson
- Written by: Dan Vebber
- Production code: UABF06
- Original air date: March 6, 2022

Episode chronology
| ← Previous "Pixelated and Afraid" | Next → "You Won't Believe What This Episode Is About – Act Three Will Shock You!" |
- The Simpsons season 33

"Boyz N the Highlands" is the thirteenth episode of the thirty-third season of the American animated television series The Simpsons, and the 719th episode overall. It aired in the United States on Fox on March 6, 2022. The episode was directed by Bob Anderson and written by Dan Vebber.

In this episode, Bart, Nelson, Dolph, and Martin go on a wilderness trek as punishment where they find a goat and try to escape from Satanists while Lisa pretends to be an only child.

== Plot ==
While on a court-ordered wilderness trek, Bart, Nelson, and Dolph are abandoned by Willie. Martin is dropped off by his parents and joins them because he wants to do it as an extracurricular activity. Along the way, the boys bully Martin. They encounter a baby goat in a cage and take it with them (Bart names him Axel). Later, some people wearing goat skull masks demand that the boys give them the goat. Meanwhile, with Bart gone and Maggie sent to Patty and Selma's apartment, Lisa demands to be treated as an only child by Homer and Marge.

The boys escape and think the people are Satanists. They find a boat to take them to their destination. Because Axel refuses to get on the boat, Nelson and Dolph take the boat while Bart, Martin, and the goat continue on foot. Nelson and Dolph encounter an Airbnb house and relax inside. The Satanists find them and lock them in the basement. Martin tries to be friends with Bart, but he rejects Martin. Martin admits that he is also on the trek as court-ordered punishment. He had stolen prescription drugs that keep him focused on academics so he can please his parents. He accuses Bart of being a follower, who is kind to Martin only if no one is around. Martin and the goat continue the trek without Bart. Meanwhile, Lisa is keeping to a strict schedule to make sure all her activities are done before Bart returns. She ends up vomiting, both out of eating too much ice cream and from a fast piggyback ride from Homer.

The next day, Lisa wakes up after spending the night sleeping in Homer and Marge’s bed with her parents and feels satisfied. Meanwhile, Bart finds Martin and apologizes. They find Nelson and Dolph as they are about to be sacrificed by the Satanists. They attack the Satanists and discover that they are film students making a found-footage horror film. The bullies accept Bart and Martin as part of their group, and they arrive at their destination. Martin refuses to go home with his parents and rides home with the other boys.

Later, as Bart and Maggie cause chaos at home, Lisa looks at photos of her time as an only child.

== Reception ==
Tony Sokol of Den of Geek gave the episode a 3.5 out of 5 stars stating, "The Simpsons benefit from turning Bart and the secondary characters into a troupe. Each gets time to shine, the interactions become layered. With limited scenarios and no lords of these flies, the story is a mishmash of sources all with soft landings. The best redemption comes at the end, with a comically visual representation of how, in spite of all the good intentions, nothing at the Simpson house has changed at all. Lisa is more content, but Bart discovered new freedom from the wilds, and Homer may never scrape Snowball III off his face. 'Boyz N the Highlands' skips the path less taken to reinforce the new direction, but loses footing along the way."

Marcus Gibson of Bubbleblabber gave the episode a 7 out of 10 stating, "Overall, 'Boyz N the Highlands' is another wilderness trip that’s as dangerous and fun as being chased by a satanist cult. It doesn’t quite match what Homer and Marge went through in their trek through the great outdoors regarding its plot. However, its humor involving Martin and Lisa being the 'only child' is enough to make this latest adventure in the wild more enjoyable than spending our endless days in front of our screens."

In its original broadcast, the episode was watched by 1.53 million viewers and was the highest-rated show on Animation Domination that night.
