= The Sound of Bleeding Gums =

- The Simpsons episode
- Episode no.: Season 33; Episode 17
- Directed by: Chris Clements
- Written by: Loni Steele Sosthand
- Production code: UABF10
- Original air date: April 10, 2022

Guest appearances
- John Autry II as Monk Murphy; Kathy Buckley as Thespian Girl; Eli Steele as "The Sky's the Limit" Director; Kaylee Arellano, Hazel Lopez and Ian Mayorga as Children singing "Happy Talk"

Episode features
- Couch gag: Lisa plays "Salt Peanuts" on her sax with the rest of the family depicted as musical notes on a staff.

Episode chronology
← Previous "Pretty Whittle Liar"	Next → "My Octopus and a Teacher"
- The Simpsons season 33

"The Sound of Bleeding Gums" is the seventeenth episode of the thirty-third season of the American animated television series The Simpsons, and the 723rd episode overall. It aired in the United States on Fox on April 10, 2022. The episode was directed by Chris Clements and written by Loni Steele Sosthand.

In this episode, Lisa learns that Bleeding Gums Murphy has a son and tries to fight for him when she learns he does not get royalties for Murphy's music. John Autry II and Kathy Buckley guest starred. The episode received positive reviews.

== Plot ==
Lisa sees a commercial for the Springfield Lottery and realizes that the jingle uses a Bleeding Gums Murphy song with new lyrics. She argues that Murphy disliked gambling, but the townspeople are all playing the lottery and singing the jingle. She goes to the local jazz club thinking that the musicians there would be angry, but they are resigned to the fact that people will always steal Black music. Although Homer tries to discourage her from fighting the lottery, she goes on the news to debate what Murphy would want, and she finds out that Murphy had a son.

Lisa is saddened as she realizes she does not know everything about Bleeding Gums Murphy. To learn more about Murphy, Lisa visits Murphy's son, Monk, and discovers that he was born deaf. Although Murphy wanted a cochlear implant for his son, he could not afford one. Monk continues to want the implant but cannot afford it himself. When she realizes that Monk is not receiving money for licensing Murphy's music to the lottery, she plans to find a way to compensate him despite his protests. She takes Monk to the jazz club to meet Murphy's friends and to learn who owns the rights to Murphy’s music. They find one of Murphy's records and see the name of its publisher.

Lisa tracks down Murphy's music publisher and learns that he sold the rights to his publisher who sold them to a consortium. She wants to keep fighting, but Monk is not interested. Lisa tells Homer that he is right, but Marge is worried for her. Lisa realizes that she cannot win with only her idealism. She apologizes to Monk, saying that she was trying to save Monk the way Murphy saved her, but Monk did not need to be saved. He accepts her apology and tells Lisa that he is getting the cochlear implant with money he won playing the lottery. Two months later, Lisa plays Murphy’s song for his son as the first thing Monk hears.

== Production ==
The plot of the episode was inspired by the life of its writer, Loni Steele Sosthand, whose brother, Eli, is hearing impaired. Sosthand grew up with a father who introduced jazz to the family and considered a situation where Lisa discovers Bleeding Gums Murphy has a deaf son. American Sign Language was also used in the episode, and the producers used two ASL consultants to make sure the ASL was as accurate as possible, despite the limitation of Simpsons characters only having four fingers on each hand. Other roles were played by three other deaf actors – Ian Mayorga, Kaylee Arellano, and Hazel Lopez – from No Limits, a nonprofit dedicated to deaf children.

This episode marked the first time a deaf actor was cast on The Simpsons: John Autry II as Monk. Sosthand recommended casting Autry as Monk to executive producers James L. Brooks and Al Jean. Autry was previously cast in a television pilot that Sosthand developed based on her and her brother's lives. Sosthand's brother Eli and deaf comedian Kathy Buckley also voiced characters in the episode.

This is also the first speaking appearance of Bleeding Gums Murphy since the death of his original voice actor, Ron Taylor, in 2002. Here, Murphy is voiced in flashback and ghost form by Kevin Michael Richardson.

== Reception ==
=== Viewing Figures ===
The episode was the most watched program of the night on Fox, scoring a 0.3 demo rating and 0.95 million viewers.

=== Critical Response ===
Tony Sokol of Den of Geek gave the episode a 3.5 out of 5 stars stating, "'The Sound of Bleeding Gums' is sweet, but not cavity-inducing. Homer is never prouder of Lisa than when she's ready to quit, and even more so of Bart who never even tried. There is always dubious hope. The Simpsons' latest season has seen a lot of character development liberally scattered throughout Springfield, much of it lateral."

Bubbleblabber gave the episode an 8.5/10 stating, "Overall, 'The Sound of Bleeding Gums' sees the show making history once again in its 33-season run. Its representation of the deaf community and a solid Lisa-focused storyline makes this a worthy historic moment for The Simpsons. Its humor also injected some enjoyment into the episode, mainly from Bart bothering Lisa and the flashback involving Lisa and Murphy performing 'Driving Miss Daisy'. With 'CODA' winning Best Picture and this week's episode, it's safe to say that the deaf community has a bright future in the media industry, especially in animation."

=== Awards and nominations ===
Writer Loni Steele Sosthand was nominated for a Writers Guild of America Award for Television: Animation at the 75th Writers Guild of America Awards for this episode.
