= Girls Just Shauna Have Fun =

- The Simpsons episode
- Episode no.: Season 33; Episode 19
- Directed by: Matthew Nastuk
- Written by: Jeff Westbrook
- Production code: UABF12
- Original air date: May 1, 2022

Guest appearance
- Chris Redd as Trevor McBride

Episode chronology
← Previous "My Octopus and a Teacher"	Next → "Marge the Meanie"
- The Simpsons season 33

"Girls Just Shauna Have Fun" is the nineteenth episode of the thirty-third season of the American animated television series The Simpsons, and the 725th episode overall. It aired in the United States on Fox on May 1, 2022. The episode was directed by Matthew Nastuk and written by Jeff Westbrook.

In this episode, Lisa bonds with Shauna Chalmers when they play in a marching band together while Homer learns how to brew beer with Superintendent Chalmers. Chris Redd guest starred as Trevor McBride. The episode received mixed reviews.

== Plot ==
Lisa is selected to substitute at the Springfield High School marching band. There, she encounters Shauna Chalmers on drums, who ignores her. Later, she finds Shauna staying late at school to practice by herself, and she admits to having a passion for music. She invites Lisa to play music at her house, but they leave for the mall when Superintendent Chalmers interrupts them. When Homer comes to pick up Lisa, Chalmers invites him to try the Trappist beer he brewed in his garage. Since he likes it, Chalmers volunteers to teach him how to brew it. Meanwhile, Lisa and Shauna bond at the mall.

Later, Lisa begins to treat Shauna like her big sister, which worries Marge. At Chalmers' house, he invites Homer to brew the next batch of beer by himself. Lisa encourages Shauna to try out for lead drummer. Shauna is reluctant but does it for Lisa. She impresses at the auditions and wins it. After performing at a football game, the football team quarterback, Trevor, invites Shauna to a party at his house and tells her to bring her friends. Lisa is worried about going, but Shauna says she will be with her big sister. Trevor says everyone must bring beer. As Homer finishes brewing his batch of beer, Shauna and Lisa perform to distract Homer and Chalmers while Trevor takes the case of beer that Shauna leaves outside the house. Trevor sees the rest of the beer and takes it all.

At the party, Shauna deserts Lisa to be with Trevor. Chalmers and Homer find the beer missing and discover that Shauna stole it. Without Shauna, Lisa gets scared at the party and calls the police. Homer and Chalmers arrive at the party and try to collect the beer. Lisa is angry at Shauna for abandoning her, and they have an argument that ends with Lisa crying. The police arrive and arrest Homer and Chalmers for serving alcohol to minors, but the beer is nonalcoholic because Homer forgot to add yeast to it, so they are freed. Homer finds Lisa and comforts her.

Later, Homer and Marge go out and have Shauna come to babysit the kids. Shauna has quit the marching band, and she credits Lisa for giving her the confidence to start her own band. They reconcile and start playing music to the annoyance of Bart, Maggie, and the pets.

== Cultural references ==
The abbey in the Belgium poster in Superintendent Chalmers' garage appears to be of Orval Abbey from the Belgian province of Luxembourg. Chalmers also compares himself to Lorelei from the television series Gilmore Girls when describing his relationship with his daughter.

== Reception ==
=== Viewing figures ===
The episode scored a 0.3 rating and 1.03 million viewers.

=== Critical response ===
Tony Sokol of Den of Geek gave the episode a 4 out of 5 stars stating, "’Girls Just Shauna Have Fun’ is a fun episode, loaded with emotional bits, one liners, and visual gags, like Mouth Mistake Hot Sauce. It is an original plot, which moves naturally, with effective overall character development. It also lets Shauna get off without a warning."

Marcus Gibson of Bubbleblabber gave the episode an 6/10 stating, "Overall, ’Girls Just Shauna Have Fun’ is a fitting episode dedicated to Lisa's passion for playing music. However, it later succumbs to the ordinary high school tropes it's satirizing. As a result, it became a mildly uninspired episode filled with predictable elements and Lisa's unlikable ’big sister'. It isn't without a few chuckle-worthy moments, including a nod to James Corden's Late Late Show and a visual gag involving a movie that somehow reminds me of the 2019 film ’Five Feet Apart’. Other than that, this episode is nowhere near as fun as I thought it would be."

=== Awards and nominations ===
Writer Jeff Westbrook was nominated for a Writers Guild of America Award for Television: Animation at the 75th Writers Guild of America Awards for this episode. However, he lost to Elijah Aron and Patrick Metcalf for their script to "Rectify" from the television series Undone.
