= You Won't Believe What This Episode Is About – Act Three Will Shock You! =

- The Simpsons episode
- Episode no.: Season 33; Episode 14
- Directed by: Jennifer Moeller
- Written by: Christine Nangle
- Production code: UABF07
- Original air date: March 13, 2022

Guest appearances
- Kumail Nanjiani as Theo; Jay Pharoah as Drederick Tatum

Episode chronology
← Previous "Boyz N the Highlands"	Next → "Bart the Cool Kid"
- The Simpsons season 33

"You Won't Believe What This Episode Is About – Act Three Will Shock You!" is the fourteenth episode of the thirty-third season of the American animated television series The Simpsons, and the 720th episode overall. It aired in the United States on Fox on March 13, 2022. The episode was directed by Jennifer Moeller and written by Christine Nangle. This is the first episode of The Simpsons to have all-female creative leads.

In this episode, Homer is sent to an institute to restore his image when videos of him doing bad deeds go viral and anger the town. Kumail Nanjiani guest starred as Theo. The episode received mixed reviews.

== Plot ==
Marge rents a new vacuum and sends the family outside while she cleans the house. Homer drops off Bart and Lisa at a trampoline park, while he goes to a dog park. There, Homer engages in an awkward conversation with Lenny, who is overly enthusiastic about his new dog. Homer is relieved when Santa's Little Helper scares Lenny's dog off, going to buy him ice cream as a treat. Before entering the store, Homer rolls down the windows and turns the AC on; Santa's Little Helper closes the windows and knocks the car keys out while jumping around in excitement, making it appear as though Homer has locked him in the car. Many passers-by notice and post misinformation about Homer, accusing him of having done it on purpose. For this incident, as well as forgetting to pick up Bart and Lisa from the trampoline park, Homer becomes a town pariah.

As the hate against Homer continues spreading, Lisa implores him to read an apology to the town. At church, Homer is given the opportunity to stand at the pulpit and make a statement. Instead of reading Lisa's apology, he calls out the crowd for being overly sensitive, mistakenly pushing Reverend Lovejoy out the window while gesturing. Footage of the incident spreads worldwide, with the Simpsons getting doxxed repeatedly and Homer losing his job at the power plant. When the family goes out to dinner, they meet Theo, who invites Homer to The Institute: a place where people falsely blamed on the Internet can have their reputations restored.

At The Institute, Homer is put in a group with four other disgraced adults, including Helen Lovejoy ("Lemonade Karen") and Kirk Van Houten ("Juice Box Dad"). Led by Theo, they stage acts of public charity, which are recorded and posted on social media. This fails, and the group are harassed once again. Theo tells them of a "Universal Eradication Code" he has invented, which can erase specific media from every hard drive on Earth. The team break into the island headquarters of ChumNet, an infamous clickbait site, to implement the code. Everyone besides Homer is distracted by the various attention-grabbing articles the site publishes, and he makes it to the server room alone. Upon plugging the code in, Homer learns that he will not only erase every trace of his group's misdeeds, but immoral acts of recent political leaders. Theo reveals that The Institute was funded for this purpose, and Homer stops the code, instead reading Lisa's apology note over a worldwide broadcast. Everyone forgives Homer, including his family, while Theo is beaten up by various Institute backers for his failure.

== Production ==
Although the show had featured female director and writer pairs before, this is the first time that women performed the top four animation roles. These women were director Jennifer Moeller, assistant director Debbie Spafford, lead timer Esther Lee, and background layout lead Heejin Kim. Christine Nangle was also credited as the writer for the episode.

Kumail Nanjiani was cast as Theo, the man who runs The Institute. In addition, this episode marked the first time that Jay Pharoah voiced Drederick Tatum, taking over for Hank Azaria. The actor change was part of an effort by the producers to stop having white actors voice non-white characters.

== Cultural references ==
This episode pays tribute to a British-produced Irish television sitcom Derry Girls, featuring an ice cream parlour called Dairy Girls Ice Cream. The Simpsons writer Matt Selman confirmed in a Tweet that it was a reference to Derry Girls, adding it was "the least we could do."

A non-speaking character resembling Joe Rogan invites Homer into his right-wing podcast studio.

== Reception ==
=== Viewing figures ===
The episode earned a 0.32 rating and was watched by 1.14 million viewers, which was the most watched show on Fox that night.

=== Critical response ===
Tony Sokol of Den of Geek gave the episode a 4 out of 5 stars stating, "The Simpsons have been on both sides of the argument. They were accused of breaking politically correct taboos, and equally criticized for adjusting for a more inclusive creative and talent staff. They don’t let themselves off the hook, and they are not making excuses. “You Won’t Believe What This Episode Is About – Act Three Will Shock You!” is clickbait you should not pass up."

John Schwarz of Bubbleblabber gave the episode a 7 out of 10 stating, "Overall, season 33 has been a strong one for The Simpsons, however, this week’s episode feels like mish-mash message on a hot topic that doesn’t quite get to the point as to what it wants to say. There was a time when The Simpsons didn’t apologize to anybody, and for the most part, this “era” is considered the high point of the franchise. If The Simpsons truly is in a renaissance period, then, is it really The Simpsons anymore? I think this episode perfectly encapsulates a lot of the struggle that the show’s producers are fielding about that very topic. We’ve seen better responses in the past."
