= Pretty Whittle Liar =

- The Simpsons episode
- Episode no.: Season 33; Episode 16
- Directed by: Mike Frank Polcino
- Written by: Joel H. Cohen
- Production code: UABF09
- Original air date: March 27, 2022

Episode features
- Couch gag: The couch scene is a sliding puzzle, where all of the pieces are scrambled. Someone (presumably Barney) successfully slides them all in the correct places. Then, Homer in the sliding puzzle belches and all of the pieces get scrambled again.

Episode chronology
← Previous "Bart the Cool Kid"	Next → "The Sound of Bleeding Gums"
- The Simpsons season 33

"Pretty Whittle Liar" is the sixteenth episode of the thirty-third season of the American animated television series The Simpsons, and the 722nd episode overall. It aired in the United States on Fox on March 27, 2022. The episode was directed by Mike Frank Polcino and written by Joel H. Cohen. The episode title is a reference to the American teen drama TV series Pretty Little Liars.

In this episode, Cletus and Brandine's marriage is strained when he learns that Brandine likes reading while Lisa tries to hide her intelligence to avoid being bullied. The episode received positive reviews.

== Plot ==
At a meeting of Marge's book club, Brandine shares an in-depth analysis on the book. Word that Brandine is secretly smart spreads in town, and Cletus finds out himself. He confronts Brandine, who reveals that she has been going to cultural events and reading books in her free time. Cletus feels that he does not know who Brandine is anymore, and kicks her out of the house. She moves in with the Simpson family, but begins to miss Cletus and their children. Meanwhile, Marge feels insecure after learning that Brandine, and other townsfolk, think she could have married a better man than Homer. She has Homer talk to Cletus, and he says that he still loves Brandine, but is still conflicted that she was hiding her true personality from him.

At school, Lisa is inducted into a group of smart students who hide their intelligence to avoid being bullied. Later, Brandine decides to move back in with Cletus, and advises Lisa to be proud of who she is. The day after, Lisa and her group stand up against Principal Skinner, resulting in him canceling school for the day. When Brandine returns home, Cletus has gotten a library card and checked out Green Eggs and Ham, so he can learn to have something in common with her. Homer apologizes to Marge by completing various household chores he had been putting off.

== Reception ==
=== Viewing figures ===
The episode earned a 0.36 rating and was watched by 1.10 million viewers, which was the second-most watched show on Fox that night.

=== Critical response ===
Tony Sokol of Den of Geek gave the episode a 3.5 out of 5 stars stating, "’Pretty Whittle Liar’ is a complicated episode, and it’s a very good thing the installment pulls back from adding another marriage crisis to the Simpsons household. But the change comes from Cletus. He betters himself to the degree where he can tell the finer points on why John Steinbeck’s Grapes of Wrath is a classic, and why the story is told much better in National Lampoon’s Vacation, currently streaming on Hillbilly Plus."

Marcus Gibson of Bubbleblabber gave the episode a 7 out of 10 stating, "Overall, “Pretty Whittle Liar’ strives in its intelligence, even though it struggles to juggle its elements into a single storyline. It offers a nice piece of development for Brandine and even Cletus, who even attempts to learn how to read books. The episode also offers some genuinely decent humor, including Homer lighting his fart on fire and the ‘Cletus on Books’ segment during the end credits. It doesn’t take a genius to know that it’s yet another enjoyable episode in the show’s thirty-third season."
