= A Made Maggie =

- The Simpsons episode
- Episode no.: Season 33; Episode 9
- Directed by: Timothy Bailey
- Written by: Elisabeth Kiernan Averick
- Production code: UABF03
- Original air date: December 19, 2021

Guest appearance
- Joe Mantegna as Fat Tony

Episode chronology
← Previous "Mothers and Other Strangers"	Next → "The Longest Marge"
- The Simpsons season 33

"A Made Maggie" is the tenth episode of the thirty-third season of the American animated television series The Simpsons, and the 716th episode overall. It aired in the United States on Fox on December 19, 2021. The episode was directed by Timothy Bailey and written by Elisabeth Kiernan Averick.

In this episode, Homer and Marge select Fat Tony to be Maggie's godfather but are worried about his influence on her. The episode received positive reviews.

== Plot ==
After spending time and money at a theme park called The Overpriced World of Angelica Button, the Simpson family return home, where they find Grandpa holding Snowball II instead of Maggie in his arms. Luckily, Ned Flanders knocks on the door with her. Tired of Grandpa's incompetence with Maggie, Marge fires him as a babysitter. During a talk with Ned, Marge mentions that they haven't baptized her. Ned has more than a thousand children that he's a godfather of and declines their request to be Maggie's godfather. Marge is tormented over the prospective of Maggie going to Hell due to not being baptized.

Marge then forces Homer to go search for a godfather for her. Homer first goes to Moe's Tavern where he finds Lenny, Carl, Moe, and Barney as unfit candidates. When two men drop a piano above them, Fat Tony saves them, saying the Blessed Mother saved them. Tony offers to be Maggie's godfather, and Homer is too scared to refuse.

On bringing the news to Marge, she gets angry because of Fat Tony's status as Springfield's crime lord, but Tony showers Maggie with gifts and seems genuinely interested in her welfare.

At the First Church of Springfield, the baptism happens with Selma appointed as Maggie's godmother. Legs and Louie become babysitters for her while Maggie starts to act like a boss herself. Johnny Tightlips and the other mobsters worry that Tony is becoming soft and begin plotting against him.

Marge becomes worried about Tony's influence on Maggie but Tony insists he's getting out of the crime business. The other mobsters arrange a hit on Tony, which he violently squashes. Realizing he is not a good influence, he bows out of being Maggie's godfather.

== Reception ==
Tony Sokol of Den of Geek gave the episode a 5 out of 5 stars stating, "The script, by Elisabeth Kiernan Averick, is nuanced, and overcrowded with both easy gags, and insanely original ones. ‘I broke out of prison for this,’ a henchman says as he buries a soiled diaper. And that burial is as detailed, executed, and animated as Tommy's interments in Goodfellas. When one of the gang has to obfuscate the already cryptic gangland language because there is a baby present, he says ‘how about we give him a boo-boo to the brain and he goes night-night forever,’ and even that is too much for Tony, who demands to know ‘You give the kiss of death with that mouth?’ Seriously, every line is great, and the turnarounds like ‘going into a legitimate legitimate business’ are sublime."

Marcus Gibson of Bubbleblabber gave the episode a 7 out of 10 stating, "Overall, ‘A Made Maggie’ is an offer that's worth taking. Its chuckle-worthy comedy and amusing plot help provide another tolerable episode that continues the season's consistent run. Although, its canon issues involving Fat Tony do prove to be bothersome for me. Plus, it would’ve been more appropriate if it was released earlier during The Godfather’s popularity status. Regardless, it's a suitable way for The Simpsons to conclude 2021 on a good note."

In its original broadcast, the episode was watched by 3.90 million viewers and was the highest-rated show on Animation Domination that night.
