= Pixelated and Afraid =

- The Simpsons episode
- Homer and Marge stranded in the wilderness
- Episode no.: Season 33; Episode 12
- Directed by: Chris Clements
- Written by: John Frink
- Production code: UABF04
- Original air date: February 27, 2022

Episode chronology
← Previous "The Longest Marge"	Next → "Boyz N the Highlands"
- The Simpsons season 33

"Pixelated and Afraid" is the twelfth episode of the thirty-third season of the American animated television series The Simpsons, and the 718th episode overall. It aired in the United States on Fox on February 27, 2022. The episode was directed by Chris Clements and written by John Frink. The title is a spoof of Naked and Afraid. Maggie Simpson does not appear in this episode.

In this episode, Homer and Marge are stranded in the wilderness on their way to a romantic resort and must learn to survive. The episode received positive reviews.

== Plot ==
Lisa, Marge, and Homer are watching a black-and-white movie, where Mick invites Moira to The Golden Gimlet for their anniversary. Lisa hopes she will have the same passionate relationship as the couple in the movie when she gets married, but Marge and Homer tell her that in ten years she will probably have the same kind of relationship as they do. The next day, Lisa tells Bart her concerns about their parents' love life, scaring him with the thought of how they will treat his future girlfriend, obese on the couch, grabbing her with mechanical hands. To remedy the situation, Bart and Lisa have a talk with their parents, with Lisa proposing to use their voucher for The Saffron Togetherness Center on top of Honeymoon Mountain.

Homer and Marge discuss the center's amenities on the way there and tell each other that they do not really want to go there, but as they try to turn the car around, they end up skidding on ice and going off the road, crashing into the frozen river. After swimming to safety with a broken phone and no car, they start a fire and hang their clothes out to dry while naked. After climbing a tree to assess the situation, Marge finds something red in an opening nearby, but as she comes down the branch breaks and the clothes burn down to ashes.

Afterwards, they reach the red sight, which is a heart-shaped bathtub, and uncover the sign of the cabins at Honeymoon Mountain. They use a matchbook to start a new fire with the bathtub full of leaves and branches, and start making new clothes and a shelter from pieces they have collected around the woods, not noticing that a wolverine is hiding in the shadows, watching them. Time passes and they get hungry and struggle to find food. They eventually catch a fish to cook, but the smoke from the fire attracts the wolverine. To get Marge safe, Homer climbs a tree and uses himself as bait, but the wolverine reaches him. Marge courageously gets out and hands Homer a stick with a statue head attached to defend himself, and he kills it. They passionately kiss under the moon.

The next day as Homer goes out to collect moss, he spots a park ranger on a bike as Homer silently struggles to decide whether to stay. Marge suggests following the tracks, so they pack up their stuff and say goodbye to the shack, and pass through the forest until they get to the ranger station, where they enjoy the sunset and embrace.

== Production ==
Executive producer Matt Selman stated that writer John Frink and producer Carolyn Omine wanted to do a Naked and Afraid parody. Omine fought to turn it into a love story for Homer and Marge. Frink wanted to include the song "Pretty World" by Sérgio Mendes & Brasil '66. Frink and Omine based the abandoned resort on similarly closed resorts in the Pocono Mountains.

The Broadcast Standards department at Fox was reluctant to show pixelated nudity of Marge and Homer, so Selman called Fox president Charlie Collier to allow for pixelation. Homer was pixelated to the same standards as Marge as a joke. The episode also depicted Homer and Marge killing a wolverine because the producers wanted to show the reality of being lost in the wilderness.

== Reception ==
=== Viewing figures ===
In its original broadcast, the episode earned a 0.39 rating and was watched by 1.41 million viewers and was the highest-rated show on Animation Domination that night.

=== Critical response ===
Tony Sokol of Den of Geek gave the episode a 4 out of 5 stars stating, "Some of this development is almost un-Homer-like. He is a little too competent in the wild. You get the idea he may have taken that crayon out of his nose again. He has the capacity to understand Marge has all the real solutions, and still finds a way to go a step further, by making sure she has matching rugs on her feet at the end of the episode. What Bart and Lisa see, when they look at Homer and Marge toss diaper bags into taco bins, is a couple who have given up. The wolverine scene proves it was all an exercise, like the ‘wax on, wax off,’ lessons in Karate Kid."

Marcus Gibson of Bubbleblabber gave the episode a 7.5 out of 10 stating, "This is one of the episodes that don’t rely heavily on slapstick and concentrate on telling the story. The writers attempt to have Homer and Marge working together to survive against the wild and the deadly wolverine while providing a message about the beauty of the great outdoors. We also see more of Homer being a caring husband for Marge instead of a careless grouch like in some previous episodes, which is great for people who needed a break from his negligent attitude. The result is far from perfect, but it is as attractive as the couple’s spark regardless."

Jesse David Fox of Vulture stated that the episode would rank among the classics.

=== Awards and nominations ===
This episode was nominated for a Primetime Emmy Award for Outstanding Animated Program at the 74th Primetime Creative Arts Emmy Awards, but lost to the Arcane episode "When These Walls Come Tumbling Down". Writer John Frink was also nominated for a Writers Guild of America Award for Television: Animation at the 75th Writers Guild of America Awards.
