= Matthew Faughnan =

American animation director

Matthew Faughnan is an American animation director with The Simpsons and has directed twenty-nine episodes. Prior to that, he was an assistant director with the show and won a Primetime Emmy Award in the category Oustatnding Animated Program in 2003 for "Three Gays of the Condo".

== Episodes of The Simpsons directed by Faughnan ==
=== Season 18 ===
- Stop, or My Dog Will Shoot!
- Treehouse of Horror XVII - co-directed with David Silverman (as Malicious Matthew C. Faughnan)

=== Season 20 ===
- Dangerous Curves

=== Season 21 ===
- The Great Wife Hope

=== Season 22 ===
- Loan-a Lisa

=== Season 23 ===
- Treehouse of Horror XXII

=== Season 24 ===
- The Day the Earth Stood Cool

=== Season 25 ===
- Labor Pains

=== Season 26 ===
- Treehouse of Horror XXV

=== Season 27 ===
- Friend with Benefit
- Orange Is the New Yellow

=== Season 28 ===
- There Will Be Buds

=== Season 29 ===
- Springfield Splendor
- Whistler's Father

=== Season 30 ===
- Treehouse of Horror XXIX
- Krusty the Clown
- Crystal Blue-Haired Persuasion

=== Season 31 ===
- Go Big or Go Homer
- The Way of the Dog

=== Season 32 ===
- Podcast News

=== Season 33 ===
- Treehouse of Horror XXXII
- A Serious Flanders (Part 2)

=== Season 34 ===
- Habeas Tortoise
- Step Brother from the Same Planet

=== Season 35 ===
- A Mid-Childhood Night's Dream
- Iron Marge

=== Season 36 ===
- The Yellow Lotus
- O C'mon All Ye Faithful (Part 2)

=== Season 37 ===
- Treehouse of Horror XXXVI
