= Mothers and Other Strangers =

- The Simpsons episode
- Episode no.: Season 33; Episode 9
- Directed by: Rob Oliver
- Written by: Al Jean
- Production code: UABF02
- Original air date: November 28, 2021

Guest appearances
- Rachel Bloom as Annette; Glenn Close as Mona Simpson

Episode features
- Couch gag: The Simpson family is placed all together in the shape of their couch. Grunting, they separate and run out of the room.

Episode chronology
← Previous "Portrait of a Lackey on Fire"	Next → "A Made Maggie"
- The Simpsons season 33

"Mothers and Other Strangers" is the eighth episode of the thirty-third season of the American animated television series The Simpsons, and the 715th episode overall. It aired in the United States on Fox on November 28, 2021. The episode was directed by Rob Oliver and written by Al Jean.

This episode is a retcon of the events of Homer's mother Mona Simpson since "Mother Simpson", in which Homer reunites with Mona after believing she died when he was a child. Here, Homer has flashbacks to discovering his mother's whereabouts in Utah as a teenager and never fully reuniting with her as an adult. Rachel Bloom and Glenn Close guest starred. The episode received positive reviews.

== Plot ==
Bart is browsing scenes on TV, when he stumbles upon Muttflix, piquing Santa's Little Helper's interest. This causes Santa's Little Helper to invite his mother, She Biscuit, over since it is Mother's Day. Bart and Lisa gift Marge mugs they made from school, gifting her the same gift they gave her previously, while Maggie gives her a baby's kiss, while teasing them for their lame gifts. They also notice that Homer is sad over hearing it is Mother's Day. After gifting Marge a framed picture of the kids, he continues crying remembering his late mother, Mona.

Lisa suggests Homer try online therapy. Annette the therapist brings him back thirty years ago to the day that Grampa got notes from Mona that she was wanted by the FBI and was leaving them. To avoid having to explain it, Grampa told then 9-year old Homer she was dead. At 16, Homer received a post card from Utah from Mona, which was secretly being monitored by the FBI. Homer confronted his father about the truth, and he and Grampa then traveled to Utah to track Mona down while being followed by the FBI. They spotted Mona at a gas station, but as she ran out to meet them, she was spotted by the FBI, who pursued the three into a canyon. When Grampa got stuck in a small gap, Homer had to choose between his mother and his father and went back towards Grampa. Mona managed to escape in the van of a hippie and left for San Francisco.

Back in the present, Grampa and Homer tell the therapist that they never found Mona again. After finishing the therapy session, Homer reveals to the family that Mona secretly visited him and Grampa in the hospital when Bart was born, checking on her new born grandson by posing as a doctor. Having achieved some closure from Mona's death, Homer takes the family out to eat.

During the credits, Homer is sleeping with a bottle of maple syrup and dreams of dancing in a circle with his family and ancestors in an homage to 8½.

== Reception ==
Tony Sokol of Den of Geek gave the episode a 4 out of 5 stars stating, "'Mothers and Other Strangers' plays a bit with the known story of Homer and his mother Mona, and the conclusion is a little forced because of it. The possible dream ending isn't as satisfying as it wants to feel, but does provide a great punchline. Every threat of an overbearingly heart-tugging moment is adeptly swept into comic territory with the ease of a moon from a newborn child. Closure is no longer considered a valid psychological concept, so we can be sure to revisit this scenario again. Homer's psyche is equally wonderful as a playground and a minefield."

Marcus Gibson of Bubbleblabber gave the episode a 7.5 out of 10 stating, "Overall, 'Mothers and Other Strangers' is another enjoyable episode that further explores Homer's history with his mother. Its humorous jokes work well alongside its heartfelt moments despite its pacing, and Glenn Close's performance was once again heavenly to the ears. It's a very late Mother's Day present for us Simpsons fans, but hey, better late than never."

In its original broadcast, the episode was watched by 3.61 million viewers and was the highest-rated show on Animation Domination that night.
