= The Winter of Our Monetized Content =

- The Simpsons episode
- Episode no.: Season 31; Episode 1
- Directed by: Bob Anderson
- Written by: Ryan Koh
- Production code: YABF19
- Original air date: September 29, 2019

Guest appearance
- John Mulaney as Warburton Parker

Episode features
- Couch gag: Homer is shown to be attempting to create an origami swan. He repeats his steps out loud until the final step, where he instead created the Simpsons sitting on the couch. He shouts "What the?!".

Episode chronology
← Previous "Crystal Blue-Haired Persuasion"	Next → "Go Big or Go Homer"
- The Simpsons season 31

"The Winter of Our Monetized Content" is the thirty-first season premiere of the American animated television series The Simpsons, and the 663rd episode overall. It aired in the United States on Fox on September 29, 2019. The director of the episode was Bob Anderson, and the writer was Ryan Koh. It was the first show to air on the now-revived Fox Animation Domination block, since American Dad!'s season 11 finale "Blagsnarst, a Love Story", on September 21, 2014.

In this episode, Homer and Bart try to monetize their fights after a video of them fighting goes viral. They bond making the videos, which makes them less popular, so they attempt a comeback fight to the death. Meanwhile, Lisa fights against privatized detention at school. John Mulaney guest starred as Warburton Parker. The episode was watched by 2.33 million viewers and received mixed reviews.

The episode was dedicated to Rick and Morty and former Simpsons producer J. Michael Mendel who died of natural causes on September 22, 2019, one week before the season premiere.

== Plot ==
At the Springfield Nuclear Power Plant, Homer, Lenny and Carl are watching Anger Watkins's sports commentary show when he asks who's better, LeBron James, Kobe Bryant, or Michael Jordan. When Homer calls the show and has a panic attack which leads to him blurting out the name of John Stockton, Watkins insults Homer and hangs up with a flushing sound. Homer is humiliated and angry, but takes Marge's advice and starts his own internet sports show.

Bart interrupts the taping of Homer's show, causing the two of them to begin brawling. Their video goes viral on the internet and a hipster named Warburton Parker tells them he's going to teach them how to make better videos and become rich: monetizing. Their next video fight, sponsored by Buzz Cola, gets over 25 million views.

Making videos brings Homer and Bart closer. When they are filmed hugging each other, however, their popularity disappears. Parker attempts to organize a comeback where Bart and Homer would fight to the death, but they refuse at the last minute, ending their internet fame.

At Springfield Elementary, Lisa inadvertently starts a food fight and is given a week of detention. Due to budget cuts, Lindsey Naegle has privatized detention, encouraging punishment for minor infractions and putting the kids to work making novelty license plates. Lisa organizes a strike, shutting the operation down. Naegle then hires impoverished workers to replace them: the teachers.

== Production ==
John Mulaney guest starred as Warburton Parker, a video monetizer. The episode was dedicated in memory of former Simpsons producer J. Michael Mendel, who worked on the show for the first ten seasons.

== Reception ==
=== Viewing figures ===
The episode earned a 0.9 rating with a 4 share and 2.33 million viewers, which was the most watched show on Fox that night.

=== Critical response ===
Dennis Perkins of The A.V. Club gave the episode a B−, stating, "Well, here you go, Homer. 'The Winter of Our Monetized Content' has a few things going for it right out of the Season 31 gate. Clever title, as far as Simpsons title gags go. And John Mulaney is a fine get for the first guest star of the season. Apart from having the voice acting chops to spare at this point, his standup relies on a specificity of vocal style that makes for a memorable one-shot character in bespectacled hipster tech millionaire (billionaire?), the cleverly named Warburton Parker. The episode itself is standard mid-season Simpsons, free from the invariably forgettable 'Look at us!' stunt plotting of a lot of recent Simpsons season premieres."

Tony Sokol of Den of Geek rated this episode 3 out of 5 stars. He stated that the commentary on social media is a bit late, but the humor is enough to keep watching.

Jesse Bereta of Bubbleblabber gave the episode a 9 out of 10. He said it was "one of the best premieres in a long time" by having a plot involving the main characters. He also highlighted the cultural references and the self-references.
