= Go Big or Go Homer =

- The Simpsons episode
- Episode no.: Season 31; Episode 2
- Directed by: Matthew Faughnan
- Written by: John Frink
- Production code: YABF21
- Original air date: October 6, 2019

Guest appearances
- Michael Rapaport as Mike Wegman; Joe Mantegna as Fat Tony

Episode chronology
← Previous "The Winter of Our Monetized Content"	Next → "The Fat Blue Line"
- The Simpsons season 31

"Go Big or Go Homer" is the second episode of the thirty-first season of the American animated television series The Simpsons, and the 664th episode overall. It aired in the United States on Fox on October 6, 2019. The episode was directed by Matthew Faughnan and written by John Frink.

In this episode, Homer attempts to mentor an older intern who idolizes him. Michael Rapaport guest starred as Mike Wegman. The episode received mixed reviews.

== Plot ==
At the Power Plant, it's Lenny's birthday. The workers prepare a surprise party, chipping in $5 each, but Mr. Burns enters just before Lenny does, signs the card in giant text and does not chip in. When Burns ruins the surprise for Lenny, Homer gets so angry that he becomes obsessed with getting Burns to apologize.

The next day, he confronts Burns, who surprises him by apologizing and contributing to the birthday fund. When Smithers finds out, he informs Homer that the skin thickener medication Burns is using makes him uncontrollably decent. As a punishment for unknowingly taking advantage of Mr. Burns's condition, Homer is demoted to supervisor of the Nuclear Power Plant interns.

When his fellow interns make fun of Homer, a man named Mike Wegman stands up and defends him, and asks Homer to be his mentor.

Homer takes Mike to his workstation, and Mike reveals that he's 35. When Homer asks him why he wants a job designed for a 20-year-old, Mike tells Homer that he has admired him for years and wants to follow in the footsteps of his hero. Homer invites him to dinner to show his family what it's like to have someone respect him.

Mike brings his pregnant wife Maurine to the dinner. When Bart starts disrespecting Homer, an enraged Mike berates him until he cries. Marge proceeds to kick Mike out of the house. Later that night, Marge proposes that Homer help Mike grow up.

Homer pushes Mike into creating his own business: "Mike's Slices", a new way of producing pizza. They ask Burns to be the investor. When Burns, who is no longer taking the medication, starts insulting Homer, Mike loses his temper and yells at him. Mr. Burns shoots Mike, but his gun is so old it has no effect.

Feeling guilty, Homer reveals to Mike that he is not the genius Mike thinks he is and has in fact caused several accidents at the plant. Homer's honesty inspires Mike, who buys a food truck with money loaned from Fat Tony. Homer is worried, but Mike assures him that he will make enough money to pay Fat Tony back by betting on a college basketball game - a bet he promptly loses.

Mike and Homer flee but Fat Tony finds them. Fat Tony is about to kill them when he tries the pizza and likes it so much that he decides to invest in the business; Mike suggests using the truck to place bets and sell marijuana as well. In the end, Fat Tony congratulates Homer on being a great mentor.

== Production ==
Michael Rapaport guest starred as Mike Wegman, a 35-year-old intern at the power plant.

== Reception ==
=== Viewing figures ===
Leading out of an NFL doubleheader, the episode earned a 2.1 rating and a 9 share and was watched by 5.63 million viewers, which was the most watched show on Fox that night.

=== Critical response ===
Dennis Perkins of The A.V. Club gave the episode a C+ stating, "Last week's Simpsons Season 31 premiere wasn't great, but it at least had guest star John Mulaney on hand to liven things up a bit. The effortless allure of being part of The Simpsons' legacy continues to attract guests in 'Go Big or Go Homer,' the season's second outing, although like the character he plays, voice actor Michael Rapaport wears out his welcome a lot sooner".

Tony Sokol of Den of Geek gave the episode 3.5 out of 5 stars. He enjoyed the escalation of the jokes in each act and wanted the episode to be longer. He also wanted to see more of Lisa in the episode.

=== Awards and nominations ===
John Frink received a nomination for the Writers Guild of America Award for Outstanding Writing in Animation at the 72nd Writers Guild of America Awards for his script to this episode.
