= John Frink =

American television writer and producer (born 1964)

- Born: Whitesboro, New York, U.S.
- Occupations: Writer, producer

John Frink is an American television writer and producer. He has written several episodes of the American animated sitcom The Simpsons, many of which he co-wrote with his former writing partner Don Payne. Frink and Payne started their career in television writing for the short-lived sitcom Hope and Gloria. They wrote their first episode of The Simpsons in 2000, and Frink still works on the show as a writer and executive producer.

== Early life and career ==
Frink was born in Whitesboro, New York. A graduate of Emerson College in Boston, Massachusetts, he holds a degree in creative writing. Frink began his career as a writer for several sitcoms together with his writing partner at the time, Don Payne. The two met at UCLA, where Frink was the boss of the Media Laboratory in which Payne worked. Payne has said to the website TheFutonCritic.com that "one day we were both trying to write individually so I said, 'why don't we pool our resources and write together and see what happens?'" In 2006, Payne told the Los Angeles Times that "I hooked up with a writing partner, John Frink, out of college. I wanted to do films. He wanted to do television." The pair reached the agreement that they would pursue a career in the medium that they first got a job offer in—whether it be film or television. They eventually ended up writing for television sitcoms such as Hope and Gloria (1995–1996) and The Brian Benben Show (1998). These sitcoms were short-lived and Payne has deemed them as failures.

== Further career ==
Frink and Payne joined the writing staff of the animated sitcom The Simpsons in 1999, participating in the show's communal rewriting process beginning in its eleventh season. The earliest episode co-written by Frink and Payne was the season twelve episode "Insane Clown Poppy", itself a holdover from season 11. "Treehouse of Horror XI", another season 11 holdover written by the pair, was broadcast earlier than "Insane Clown Poppy", but was produced after. Payne said in an interview with TV Squad in 2006 that "My partner and I were actually working on one of a long string of failed sitcoms (and most sitcoms are failed sitcoms!) On the day a show is officially cancelled, it's kind of a tradition for the writing staff to go out to a restaurant, eat a nice meal, and drown their sorrows. On the way there, a writer named Jace Richdale (who had also worked on The Simpsons) told my partner and me that The Simpsons was looking for some writers. He wanted to know if we'd be interested in it, because he would recommend us. My jaw literally dropped. So he contacted the show-runner, a guy named Mike Scully, who read our spec script and met with us, then hired us on."

After a few years of working on The Simpsons together, Frink and Payne's writing partnership ended. They both continued to work on the show, though, and Payne has described their split-up as amicable. The first episode Frink wrote on his own was season fifteen's "Bart-Mangled Banner" (2004). Since the twenty-first season of The Simpsons (2009–2010), he has been credited as an executive producer.

The Simpsons character Professor Frink, a The Nutty Professor-esque scientist, was named after Frink, although the character was introduced before he was hired as a writer on the show.

== Awards ==
Frink has won several awards for his work on The Simpsons. He has also received several award nominations.

Accolades for John Frink
Year	Award	Category	Series	Notes	Result	Ref.
2000	Primetime Emmy Award	Outstanding Animated Program (for Programming Less Than One Hour)	The Simpsons	As producer	Won	
2001	Primetime Emmy Award	Outstanding Animated Program (for Programming Less Than One Hour)	The Simpsons	As producer	Won	
2002	Primetime Emmy Award	Outstanding Animated Program (for Programming Less Than One Hour)	The Simpsons	As supervising producer	Nominated	
2003	Primetime Emmy Award	Outstanding Animated Program (for Programming Less Than One Hour)	The Simpsons	As co-executive producer	Won	
2003	Writers Guild of America Award	Animation	The Simpsons	For the episode "The Bart Wants What It Wants"	Nominated	
2004	Primetime Emmy Award	Outstanding Animated Program (for Programming Less Than One Hour)	The Simpsons	As co-executive producer	Nominated	
2005	Primetime Emmy Award	Outstanding Animated Program (for Programming Less Than One Hour)	The Simpsons	As co-executive producer	Nominated	
2006	Primetime Emmy Award	Outstanding Animated Program (for Programming Less Than One Hour)	The Simpsons	As co-executive producer	Won	
2006	Writers Guild of America Award	Animation	The Simpsons	For the episode "The Girl Who Slept Too Little"	Nominated	
2007	Primetime Emmy Award	Outstanding Animated Program (for Programming Less Than One Hour)	The Simpsons	As co-executive producer	Nominated	
2007	Writers Guild of America Award	Animation	The Simpsons	For the episode "The Italian Bob"	Won	
2008	Primetime Emmy Award	Outstanding Animated Program (for Programming Less Than One Hour)	The Simpsons	As co-executive producer	Won	
2008	Writers Guild of America Award	Animation	The Simpsons	For the episode "Stop, or My Dog Will Shoot!"	Nominated	
2009	Primetime Emmy Award	Outstanding Animated Program (for Programming Less Than One Hour)	The Simpsons	As co-executive producer	Nominated	
2009	Writers Guild of America Award	Comedy series	The Simpsons	As a member of the writing staff	Nominated	
2010	Primetime Emmy Award	Outstanding Animated Program (for Programming Less Than One Hour)	The Simpsons	As co-executive producer	Nominated	
2010	Writers Guild of America Award	Animation	The Simpsons	For the episode "Eeny Teeny Maya Moe"	Nominated	
2010	Annie Award	Writing in a Television Production	The Simpsons	For the episode "Stealing First Base"	Nominated	
2011	Primetime Emmy Award	Outstanding Animated Program (for Programming Less Than One Hour)	The Simpsons	As executive producer and writer of the episode "Angry Dad: The Movie"	Nominated	

== Credits ==
John Frink credits outside of The Simpsons
Year	Series	Role	Notes
1995	Hope and Gloria	Writer	Co-wrote the episode "A Fine ROM-ance"
1995	Pride & Joy	Writer	Co-wrote the episode "Brenda's Secret"
1995–1996	Can't Hurry Love	Writer	Co-wrote the episodes "Annie Get Your Armoire", "Glove Story", and "Valentine's Day Massacred"
1997	Men Behaving Badly	Writer	Co-wrote the episodes "Wet Nurse" and "Playing Doctor"
1997	Veronica's Closet	Co-producer	Co-produced the episode "Veronica's First Thanksgiving"
1998	The Brian Benben Show	Writer and producer	Co-wrote the episode "House of Blues"
2000–present	The Simpsons	Writer and producer	For a list of episodes written, see below
2007	The Simpsons Movie	Consultant writer	

=== The Simpsons episodes ===
Episodes of The Simpsons written by John Frink
Title	Season	Airdate	Notes
"Treehouse of Horror XI"	12	2000	Co-written by Don Payne
"Insane Clown Poppy"	12	2000	Co-written by Don Payne
"Bye Bye Nerdie"	12	2001	Co-written by Don Payne
"Simpsons Tall Tales"	12	2001	Co-written by Don Payne
"Treehouse of Horror XII"	13	2001	Co-written by Don Payne
"The Bart Wants What It Wants"	13	2002	Co-written by Don Payne
"The Great Louse Detective"	14	2002	Co-written by Don Payne
"Old Yeller Belly"	14	2003	Co-written by Don Payne
"The Wandering Juvie"	15	2004	Co-written by Don Payne
"Bart-Mangled Banner"	15	2004	
"The Girl Who Slept Too Little"	17	2005	
"The Italian Bob"	17	2005	
"Stop! Or My Dog Will Shoot"	18	2007	
"All About Lisa"	19	2008	
"Lost Verizon"	20	2008	
"Eeny Teeny Maya Moe"	20	2009	
"Stealing First Base"	21	2010	
"The Bob Next Door"	21	2010	
"Angry Dad: The Movie"	22	2011	
"500 Keys"	22	2011	
"Politically Inept, with Homer Simpson"	23	2012	
"Black Eyed, Please"	24	2013	
"What to Expect When Bart's Expecting"	25	2014	
"Waiting for Duffman"	26	2015	
"Peeping Mom"	26	2015	
"Love Is in the N2-O2-Ar-CO2-Ne-He-CH4"	27	2016	
"Simprovised"	27	2016	
"Treehouse of Horror XXVIII"	29	2017	
"Gone Boy"	29	2017	
"Left Behind"	29	2018	Co-written by Joel H. Cohen & Al Jean
"'Tis the 30th Season"	30	2018	Co-written by Joel H. Cohen & Jeff Westbrook
"Go Big or Go Homer"	31	2019	
"Bobby, It's Cold Outside"	31	2019	Co-written by Jeff Westbrook
"The 7 Beer Itch"	32	2020	Co-written by Joel H. Cohen & Al Jean
"Treehouse of Horror XXXII"	33	2021	
"Pixelated and Afraid"	33	2022	
"Bartless"	34	2023	
"Cremains of the Day"	35	2024	
"Men Behaving Manly"	37	2025	
"Guess Who's Coming to Skinner"	37	2025	
