= Joel H. Cohen =

Canadian screenwriter and producer

Joel H. Cohen is a Canadian producer and writer. He is best known for his work on Saturday Night Live, Suddenly Susan, and The Simpsons. He is the younger brother of one-time Simpsons writer Robert Cohen, who wrote the season three episode "Flaming Moe's". Cohen was born in Calgary, Alberta. He received a Bachelor of Science degree in 1988 from the University of Alberta and an MBA from the Schulich School of Business in 1992.

In addition to his work on The Simpsons, he is also the author of the non-fiction book How to Lose a Marathon, a retelling of his training for and running the New York City Marathon. It was released April 4, 2017 by Abrams and as an audiobook by Audible.

== The Simpsons ==
- "Treehouse of Horror XII" ("Hex and the City") (2001)
- "Brawl in the Family" (2002)
- "The Fat and the Furriest" (2003)
- "Today I Am a Clown" (2003)
- "Fat Man and Little Boy" (2004)
- "Home Away from Homer" (2005)
- "The Last of the Red Hat Mamas" (2005)
- "Homer's Paternity Coot" (2006)
- "Marge and Homer Turn a Couple Play" (2006)
- "Revenge Is a Dish Best Served Three Times" (2007)
- "He Loves to Fly and He D'ohs" (2007)
- "The Debarted" (2008)
- "Mona Leaves-a" (2008)
- "Wedding for Disaster" (2009)
- "Treehouse of Horror XXI" (2010)
- "Lisa Simpson, This Isn't Your Life" (2010)
- "Homer the Father" (2011)
- "Gone Abie Gone" (2012)
- "A Test Before Trying" (2013)
- "Yellow Subterfuge" (2013)
- "Clown in the Dumps" (2014)
- "Cue Detective" (2015)
- "Treehouse of Horror XXVI" (2015)
- "Teenage Mutant Milk-Caused Hurdles" (2016)
- "Treehouse of Horror XXVII" (2016)
- "22 for 30" (2017)
- "Left Behind" (2018)
- "Treehouse of Horror XXIX" (2018)
- "'Tis the 30th Season" (2018)
- "The Girl on the Bus" (2019)
- "The Hateful Eight-Year-Olds" (2020)
- "The 7 Beer Itch" (2020)
- "The Wayz We Were" (2021)
- "Pretty Whittle Liar" (2022)
- "Top Goon" (2022)
- "Do the Wrong Thing" (2023)
- "Frinkenstein's Monster" (2024)
- "Abe League of Their Moe" (2025)
- "The Day of the Jack-up" (2025)
- "Treehouse of Horror XXXVII" ("Bride’s Shed Revisited") (2026)

He also served as a script consultant on The Simpsons Movie.
