= List of The Simpsons episodes =

Series logo

The Simpsons is an American animated sitcom created by Matt Groening for the Fox Broadcasting Company. It is a satirical depiction of a dysfunctional middle-class American lifestyle starring the eponymous family: Homer, Marge, Bart, Lisa, and Maggie. Set in the town of Springfield, the show lampoons both American culture and the human condition. The family was conceived by Groening shortly before a pitch for a series of animated shorts with producer James L. Brooks. Groening named each character (other than Bart) after members of his own family. The shorts became part of the Fox series The Tracey Ullman Show on April 19, 1987. After a three-season run, the sketch was developed into a half-hour primetime hit show.

The show holds several American television longevity records. It is the longest-running primetime animated series and longest-running sitcom in the United States. With its 21st season (2009–10), the series surpassed Gunsmoke (which had 20 seasons) to claim the spot as the longest-running American primetime scripted television series, and later also surpassed Gunsmoke (which had 635 episodes) for episode count in this category, starting with the 29th-season episode "Forgive and Regret" on April 29, 2018.

Episodes of The Simpsons have won dozens of awards, including 37 Emmys (ten for Outstanding Animated Program), 30 Annies, and a Peabody. The Simpsons Movie, a feature-length film, was released in theaters worldwide on July 26 and 27, 2007, and grossed US$526.2 million worldwide. The first 20 seasons are available on DVD in regions 1, 2, and 4, with the twentieth season released on both DVD and Blu-ray in 2010 to celebrate the 20th anniversary of the series. On April 8, 2015, showrunner Al Jean announced that there would be no more DVD or Blu-ray releases, shifting focus to digital distribution, although this was later reversed on July 22, 2017. Almost two years later, on July 20, 2019, it was announced that Season 19 would be released on December 3, 2019, on DVD or Blu-ray.

On April 28, 1994, The Simpsons reached its 100th episode in its 5th season. On April 26, 1998, The Simpsons reached its 200th episode in its 9th season. On February 2, 2003, The Simpsons reached its 300th episode in its 14th season. On May 20, 2007, The Simpsons reached its 400th episode in its 18th season. On February 19, 2012, The Simpsons reached its 500th episode in its 23rd season. On October 16, 2016, The Simpsons reached its 600th episode in its 28th season. On March 21, 2021, The Simpsons reached its 700th episode in its 32nd season. On December 7, 2025, The Simpsons reached its 800th episode in its 37th season. (Note: Multiple episodes are considered the 800th episode. See The Simpsons season 37 § 800th episode for further details.)

As of November 15, 2026, 816 episodes of The Simpsons have aired, currently in its thirty-eighth season. On April 2, 2025, The Simpsons was renewed through Season 40.

== Series overview ==
- Seasons 1–11 are ranked by households (in millions).
- Seasons 12–35 are ranked by total viewers (in millions).

| Season | Episodes | Originally released | | | Households / viewers | Rank | Rating |
| Season | Episodes | First released | Last released | Network | Households / viewers | Rank | Rating |
|---|---|---|---|---|---|---|---|
| 1 | 13 | December 17, 1989 | May 13, 1990 | Fox | 13.4m h.^{[n1]} | 30 | 14.5 |
| 2 | 22 | October 11, 1990 | July 11, 1991 | Fox | 12.2m h.^{[n1]}^{[n2]} | 38 | 8 |
| 3 | 24 | September 19, 1991 | August 27, 1992 | Fox | 12m h.^{[n1]}^{[n3]} | 33 | N/A |
| 4 | 22 | September 24, 1992 | May 13, 1993 | Fox | 12.1m h.^{[n1]} | 30 | 13 |
| 5 | 22 | September 30, 1993 | May 19, 1994 | Fox | 10.5m h.^{[n1]}^{[n4]} | 53 | N/A |
| 6 | 25 | September 4, 1994 | May 21, 1995 | Fox | 9m h.^{[n1]} | 67 | N/A |
| 7 | 25 | September 17, 1995 | May 19, 1996 | Fox | 8m h.^{[n1]} | 75 | N/A |
| 8 | 25 | October 27, 1996 | May 18, 1997 | Fox | 8.6m h. | 53 | N/A |
| 9 | 25 | September 21, 1997 | May 17, 1998 | Fox | 9.1m h. | 30 | 9.2 |
| 10 | 23 | August 23, 1998 | May 16, 1999 | Fox | 7.9m h. | 46 | N/A |
| 11 | 22 | September 26, 1999 | May 21, 2000 | Fox | 8.2m h. | 44 | N/A |
| 12 | 21 | November 1, 2000 | May 20, 2001 | Fox | 14.7m v. | 21 | N/A |
| 13 | 22 | November 6, 2001 | May 22, 2002 | Fox | 12.4m v. | 30 | N/A |
| 14 | 22 | November 3, 2002 | May 18, 2003 | Fox | 13.4m v. | 25 | N/A |
| 15 | 22 | November 2, 2003 | May 23, 2004 | Fox | 10.6m v. | 42 | N/A |
| 16 | 21 | November 7, 2004 | May 15, 2005 | Fox | 9.6m v. | 52 | N/A |
| 17 | 22 | September 11, 2005 | May 21, 2006 | Fox | 9.1m v. | 62 | 3.2 |
| 18 | 22 | September 10, 2006 | May 20, 2007 | Fox | 8.6m v. | 60 | 4.1 |
| 19 | 20 | September 23, 2007 | May 18, 2008 | Fox | 8m v. | 87 | N/A |
| 20 | 21 | September 28, 2008 | May 17, 2009 | Fox | 6.9m v. | 77 | N/A |
| 21 | 23 | September 27, 2009 | May 23, 2010 | Fox | 7.2m v. | 61 | 3.4 |
| 22 | 22 | September 26, 2010 | May 22, 2011 | Fox | 7.3m v. | 65 | 3.3 |
| 23 | 22 | September 25, 2011 | May 20, 2012 | Fox | 7m v. | 69 | 3.3 |
| 24 | 22 | September 30, 2012 | May 19, 2013 | Fox | 6.3m v. | 70 | 2.9 |
| 25 | 22 | September 29, 2013 | May 18, 2014 | Fox | 5.6m v. | 81 | N/A |
| 26 | 22 | September 28, 2014 | May 17, 2015 | Fox | 5.6m v. | 100 | 2.6 |
| 27 | 22 | September 27, 2015 | May 22, 2016 | Fox | 4.7m v. | 102 | 2.1 |
| 28 | 22 | September 25, 2016 | May 21, 2017 | Fox | 4.8m v. | 92 | 2.1 |
| 29 | 21 | October 1, 2017 | May 20, 2018 | Fox | 4.1m v. | 122 | 1.7 |
| 30 | 23 | September 30, 2018 | May 12, 2019 | Fox | 3.7m v. | 126 | 1.4 |
| 31 | 22 | September 29, 2019 | May 17, 2020 | Fox | 3m v. | 103 | 1.1 |
| 32 | 22 | September 27, 2020 | May 23, 2021 | Fox | 2.4m v. | 117 | 0.8 |
| 33 | 22 | September 26, 2021 | May 22, 2022 | Fox | 2.3m v. | 98 | 0.7 |
| 34 | 22 | September 25, 2022 | May 21, 2023 | Fox | 2.1m v. | 98 | 0.65 |
| 35 | 18 | October 1, 2023 | May 19, 2024 | Fox | 1.99m v. | 106 | 0.58 |
| 36 | 22^{[n5]} | September 29, 2024 | May 18, 2025 | Fox; Disney+ | N/A | N/A | N/A |
| 37 | 19^{[n6]} | September 28, 2025 | August 26, 2026 | Fox; Disney+ | N/A | N/A | N/A |
| 38 | 17^{[n7]} | September 27, 2026 | TBA | Fox; Disney+ | N/A | N/A | N/A |

=== Notes ===
1. Until the 1996–97 television season, ratings were calculated over 30 weeks from September to mid-April. Episodes that aired after mid-April were not part of the overall average and ranking.
2. Season one had approximately 13.4 million viewing households. Season two dropped 9%, resulting in an average of approximately 12.2 million viewing households.
3. Season three had an average rating of 13.0 points. For the 1991–92 season, each point represented 921,000 viewing households, resulting in a total average of approximately 12.0 million viewing households.
4. Season four had approximately 12.1 million viewing households. Season five dropped 13%, resulting in an average of approximately 10.5 million viewing households.
5. Season 36 had eighteen episodes broadcast on Fox, and four are Disney+ exclusives that are not a part of the normal season.
6. Season 37 had fifteen episodes broadcast on Fox, with an additional four Disney+ exclusives that are not a part of the normal season.
7. Seasons 38 through 40 will have the same episode counts on Fox and an additional two Disney+ exclusives that are not a part of the normal season.

== Films ==
| Title | Directed by | Written by | Release date (U.S.) |
|---|---|---|---|
| The Simpsons Movie | David Silverman | James L. Brooks, Matt Groening, Al Jean, Ian Maxtone-Graham, George Meyer, David Mirkin, Mike Reiss, Mike Scully, Matt Selman, John Swartzwelder and Jon Vitti | July 27, 2007 |
| The New Simpsons Movie | Rob Oliver | TBA | September 3, 2027 |

=== The New Simpsons Movie (2027) ===
In August 2026 at the 2026 D23 Expo, The New Simpsons Movie was announced for release in September 2027.

== Shorts ==
=== Theatrical ===
| Title | Directed by | Written by | Original release date |
|---|---|---|---|
| The Longest Daycare | David Silverman | James L. Brooks, Matt Groening, Al Jean, David Mirkin, Joel H. Cohen & Michael Price | July 13, 2012 |
| Playdate with Destiny | David Silverman | Al Jean, Tom Gammill, Max Pross, James L. Brooks, Matt Groening, Michael Price, Matt Selman & David Silverman | March 6, 2020 |

=== Disney+ ===
| Title | Directed by | Written by | Original release date |
|---|---|---|---|
| The Force Awakens from Its Nap | David Silverman | Joel H. Cohen, Al Jean & Michael Price | May 4, 2021 |
| The Good, the Bart, and the Loki | David Silverman | Elisabeth Kiernan Averick, Jessica Conrad, John Frink, Al Jean & Jeff Westbrook | July 7, 2021 |
| Plusaversary | David Silverman | Joel H. Cohen, Jessica Conrad, Al Jean, Loni Steele Sosthand & Dan Vebber | November 12, 2021 |
| When Billie Met Lisa | David Silverman | Elisabeth Kiernan Averick, Broti Gupta, Al Jean, Cesar Mazariegos & David Mirkin | April 22, 2022 |
| Welcome to the Club | David Silverman | J. Stewart Burns, Joel H. Cohen, Al Jean, Christine Nangle & Loni Steele Sosthand | September 8, 2022 |
| The Simpsons Meet the Bocellis in 'Feliz Navidad' | David Silverman | Joel H. Cohen, Al Jean, Ryan Koh & David Mirkin | December 15, 2022 |
| Rogue Not Quite One | David Silverman | Al Jean, Ryan Koh, Loni Steele Sosthand, Dan Vebber & Jeff Westbrook | May 4, 2023 |
| May the 12th Be with You | David Silverman | Joel H. Cohen, Al Jean, Ryan Koh, David Mirkin & Jeff Westbrook | May 10, 2024 |
| The Most Wonderful Time of the Year | David Silverman | J. Stewart Burns, Dan Greaney, Broti Gupta & Al Jean | October 11, 2024 |

=== Miscellaneous ===
| Title | Directed by | Written by | Original release date |
|---|---|---|---|
| Trumptastic Voyage | David Silverman | Al Jean | July 7, 2015 |
| The Simpsons | Balenciaga | David Silverman | Joel H. Cohen, Al Jean & Michael Price | October 2, 2021 |
| Te Deseo Lo Mejor | David Silverman | Joel H. Cohen, Al Jean, Ryan Koh & Christine Nangle | December 24, 2021 |

== Specials ==
| Title | Directed by | Written by | Original release date | Prod. code | U.S. viewers (millions) |
|---|---|---|---|---|---|
| "Springfield's Most Wanted" | Bill Brown | Jack Parmeter & Bob Bain | September 17, 1995 | SP−9611 | 14.0 |
In a parody of America's Most Wanted, host John Walsh explores the mystery behind who shot Mr. Burns, laying out the potential clues and identifying the possible suspects. Note: The special aired immediately before the Season 7 premiere of "Who Shot Mr. Burns? (Part Two)."
| "The Simpsons 20th Anniversary Special – In 3-D! On Ice!" | Morgan Spurlock | Jeremy Chilnick & Morgan Spurlock | January 10, 2010 | LABF21 | 11.43 |
The film examines the "cultural phenomenon" of The Simpsons and includes interviews with both the cast and some fans of the show. Note: The special aired immediately following "Once Upon a Time in Springfield", was assigned production number LABF21 and technically counts as a component of the 20th production season (and of the 21st broadcast season). It does not, however, count towards the series' official episode count.
| "Springfield of Dreams: The Legend of Homer Simpson" | Morgan Spurlock | Eric Brewster, Jeremy Chilnick & Morgan Spurlock | October 22, 2017 | N/A | N/A |
An hourlong mockumentary in the style of Ken Burns' Baseball, aired on Fox to commemorate the 25th anniversary of the episode "Homer at the Bat", as well as Homer's induction into the National Baseball Hall of Fame and Museum. Note: The special was produced by Fox Sports.

== Ratings ==
With its first season, The Simpsons became the Fox network's first series to rank among the top thirty highest-rated shows of a television season. Due to this success, Fox decided to switch The Simpsons' timeslot in hopes of higher ratings for the shows airing after it. The series moved from 8:00 p.m. eastern time on Sundays to the same time on Thursdays, where it competed with The Cosby Show, the number-one show at the time.

Many of the producers were against the move, as The Simpsons had been in the top ten while airing on Sunday, and they felt the move would destroy its ratings. Ratings-wise, new episodes of The Cosby Show beat The Simpsons every time during the second season, and The Simpsons eventually fell out of the top ten. At the end of the season, Cosby averaged as the fifth-highest-rated show on television, while The Simpsons was thirty-eighth.

The show continued in its Thursday timeslot until the sixth season, which is when, in 1994, it reverted to its original slot on Sunday. It has remained there ever since.
