= List of The Simpsons episodes (season 21–present) =

Episode list for an animated series

The Simpsons is an American animated sitcom created by Matt Groening for the Fox Broadcasting Company. It is a satirical depiction of a dysfunctional middle-class American lifestyle starring the eponymous family: Homer, Marge, Bart, Lisa, and Maggie. Set in the town of Springfield, the show lampoons both American culture and the human condition. The family was conceived by Groening shortly before a pitch for a series of animated shorts with producer James L. Brooks. Groening named each character (other than Bart, which is an anagram for "brat") after members of his own family. The shorts became part of the Fox series The Tracey Ullman Show on April 19, 1987. After a three-season run, the sketch was developed into a half-hour prime-time hit show.

The show holds several American television longevity records. It is the longest-running prime-time animated series and longest-running sitcom in the United States. With its twenty-first season (2009–10), the series surpassed Gunsmoke in seasons to claim the spot as the longest-running American prime-time scripted television series, and later also surpassed Gunsmoke in episode count with the twenty-ninth season episode "Forgive and Regret" on April 29, 2018.

Episodes of The Simpsons have won dozens of awards, including 31 Emmys (ten for Outstanding Animated Program), 30 Annies, and a Peabody. The Simpsons Movie, a feature-length film, was released in theaters worldwide on July 26 and 27, 2007 and grossed US$526.2 million worldwide. The first twenty seasons are available on DVD in regions 1, 2, and 4, with the twentieth season released on both DVD and Blu-ray in 2010 to celebrate the 20th anniversary of the series. On April 8, 2015, showrunner Al Jean announced that there would be no more DVD or Blu-ray releases, shifting focus to digital distribution, although this was later reversed on July 22, 2017. Almost two years later, on July 20, 2019, it was announced that Season 19 would be released on December 3, 2019, on DVD.

The Simpsons reached its 500th episode in the twenty-third season (2012); its 600th episode in the twenty-eighth season (2016); its 700th episode in the thirty-second season (2021); and its 800th episode in the thirty-seventh season (2025). (Note: Multiple episodes are considered the 800th episode. See The Simpsons season 37 § 800th episode for further details.) On April 2, 2025, it was announced that The Simpsons would be renewed for four more seasons in what is considered a "mega deal" with parent company Disney. This renewal will take the show through the 2028–2029 television season, coinciding with the 40th anniversary of the show. Each season will consist of 15 episodes to be aired on Fox, with an additional two episodes per season to be released exclusively on Disney+.

As of November 15, 2026, 816 episodes of The Simpsons have aired, currently in its thirty-eighth season.

== Series overview ==
Season	Episodes	Originally released			Households / viewers	Rank	Rating
Season	Episodes	First released	Last released	Network	Households / viewers	Rank	Rating
1	13	December 17, 1989	May 13, 1990	Fox	13.4m h.^{[n1]}	30	14.5
2	22	October 11, 1990	July 11, 1991	Fox	12.2m h.^{[n1]}^{[n2]}	38	8
3	24	September 19, 1991	August 27, 1992	Fox	12m h.^{[n1]}^{[n3]}	33	N/A
4	22	September 24, 1992	May 13, 1993	Fox	12.1m h.^{[n1]}	30	13
5	22	September 30, 1993	May 19, 1994	Fox	10.5m h.^{[n1]}^{[n4]}	53	N/A
6	25	September 4, 1994	May 21, 1995	Fox	9m h.^{[n1]}	67	N/A
7	25	September 17, 1995	May 19, 1996	Fox	8m h.^{[n1]}	75	N/A
8	25	October 27, 1996	May 18, 1997	Fox	8.6m h.	53	N/A
9	25	September 21, 1997	May 17, 1998	Fox	9.1m h.	30	9.2
10	23	August 23, 1998	May 16, 1999	Fox	7.9m h.	46	N/A
11	22	September 26, 1999	May 21, 2000	Fox	8.2m h.	44	N/A
12	21	November 1, 2000	May 20, 2001	Fox	14.7m v.	21	N/A
13	22	November 6, 2001	May 22, 2002	Fox	12.4m v.	30	N/A
14	22	November 3, 2002	May 18, 2003	Fox	13.4m v.	25	N/A
15	22	November 2, 2003	May 23, 2004	Fox	10.6m v.	42	N/A
16	21	November 7, 2004	May 15, 2005	Fox	9.6m v.	52	N/A
17	22	September 11, 2005	May 21, 2006	Fox	9.1m v.	62	3.2
18	22	September 10, 2006	May 20, 2007	Fox	8.6m v.	60	4.1
19	20	September 23, 2007	May 18, 2008	Fox	8m v.	87	N/A
20	21	September 28, 2008	May 17, 2009	Fox	6.9m v.	77	N/A
21	23	September 27, 2009	May 23, 2010	Fox	7.2m v.	61	3.4
22	22	September 26, 2010	May 22, 2011	Fox	7.3m v.	65	3.3
23	22	September 25, 2011	May 20, 2012	Fox	7m v.	69	3.3
24	22	September 30, 2012	May 19, 2013	Fox	6.3m v.	70	2.9
25	22	September 29, 2013	May 18, 2014	Fox	5.6m v.	81	N/A
26	22	September 28, 2014	May 17, 2015	Fox	5.6m v.	100	2.6
27	22	September 27, 2015	May 22, 2016	Fox	4.7m v.	102	2.1
28	22	September 25, 2016	May 21, 2017	Fox	4.8m v.	92	2.1
29	21	October 1, 2017	May 20, 2018	Fox	4.1m v.	122	1.7
30	23	September 30, 2018	May 12, 2019	Fox	3.7m v.	126	1.4
31	22	September 29, 2019	May 17, 2020	Fox	3m v.	103	1.1
32	22	September 27, 2020	May 23, 2021	Fox	2.4m v.	117	0.8
33	22	September 26, 2021	May 22, 2022	Fox	2.3m v.	98	0.7
34	22	September 25, 2022	May 21, 2023	Fox	2.1m v.	98	0.65
35	18	October 1, 2023	May 19, 2024	Fox	1.99m v.	106	0.58
36	22^{[n5]}	September 29, 2024	May 18, 2025	Fox; Disney+	N/A	N/A	N/A
37	19^{[n6]}	September 28, 2025	August 26, 2026	Fox; Disney+	N/A	N/A	N/A
38	17^{[n7]}	September 27, 2026	TBA	Fox; Disney+	N/A	N/A	N/A

=== Notes ===
1. Until the 1996–97 television season, ratings were calculated over 30 weeks from September to mid-April. Episodes that aired after mid-April were not part of the overall average and ranking.
2. Season one had approximately 13.4 million viewing households. Season two dropped 9%, resulting in an average of approximately 12.2 million viewing households.
3. Season three had an average rating of 13.0 points. For the 1991–92 season, each point represented 921,000 viewing households, resulting in a total average of approximately 12.0 million viewing households.
4. Season four had approximately 12.1 million viewing households. Season five dropped 13%, resulting in an average of approximately 10.5 million viewing households.
5. Season 36 had eighteen episodes broadcast on Fox, and four are Disney+ exclusives that are not a part of the normal season.
6. Season 37 had fifteen episodes broadcast on Fox, with an additional four Disney+ exclusives that are not a part of the normal season.
7. Seasons 38 through 40 will have the same episode counts on Fox and an additional two Disney+ exclusives that are not a part of the normal season.

== Episodes ==
=== Season 21 (2009–2010) ===
Note: This is the first season to air entirely in high definition.

No. overall	No. in season	Title	Directed by	Written by	Original release date	Prod. code	U.S. viewers (millions)
442	1	"Homer the Whopper"	Lance Kramer	Seth Rogen & Evan Goldberg	September 27, 2009	LABF13	8.31
443	2	"Bart Gets a "Z""	Mark Kirkland	Matt Selman	October 4, 2009	LABF15	9.37
444	3	"The Great Wife Hope"	Matthew Faughnan	Carolyn Omine	October 11, 2009	LABF16	7.60
445	4	"Treehouse of Horror XX"	Mike B. Anderson & Matthew Schofield	Daniel Chun	October 18, 2009	LABF14	8.69
446	5	"The Devil Wears Nada"	Nancy Kruse	Tim Long	November 15, 2009	LABF17	9.13
447	6	"Pranks and Greens"	Chuck Sheetz	Jeff Westbrook	November 22, 2009	LABF18	6.88
448	7	"Rednecks and Broomsticks"	Bob Anderson & Rob Oliver	Kevin Curran	November 29, 2009	LABF19	8.87
449	8	"O Brother, Where Bart Thou?"	Steven Dean Moore	Matt Selman	December 13, 2009	MABF01	6.97
450	9	"Thursdays with Abie"	Mike Frank Polcino	Don Payne & Mitchell H. Glazer	January 3, 2010	MABF02	8.55
451	10	"Once Upon a Time in Springfield"	Matthew Nastuk	Stephanie Gillis	January 10, 2010	LABF20	14.62
452	11	"Million Dollar Maybe"	Chris Clements	Bill Odenkirk	January 31, 2010	MABF03	4.95
453	12	"Boy Meets Curl"	Chuck Sheetz	Rob LaZebnik	February 14, 2010	MABF05	5.85
454	13	"The Color Yellow"	Raymond S. Persi	Billy Kimball & Ian Maxtone-Graham	February 21, 2010	MABF06	5.98
455	14	"Postcards from the Wedge"	Mark Kirkland	Brian Kelley	March 14, 2010	MABF04	5.18
456	15	"Stealing First Base"	Steven Dean Moore	John Frink	March 21, 2010	MABF07	5.71
457	16	"The Greatest Story Ever D'ohed"	Mike Frank Polcino	Kevin Curran	March 28, 2010	MABF10	5.69
458	17	"American History X-cellent"	Bob Anderson	Michael Price	April 11, 2010	MABF08	5.64
459	18	"Chief of Hearts"	Chris Clements	Carolyn Omine & William Wright	April 18, 2010	MABF09	5.83
460	19	"The Squirt and the Whale"	Lance Kramer	Matt Warburton	April 25, 2010	MABF14	5.92
461	20	"To Surveil with Love"	Mark Kirkland	Michael Nobori	May 2, 2010	MABF12	6.03
462	21	"Moe Letter Blues"	Matthew Nastuk	Stephanie Gillis	May 9, 2010	MABF13	5.67
463	22	"The Bob Next Door"	Nancy Kruse	John Frink	May 16, 2010	MABF11	6.24
464	23	"Judge Me Tender"	Steven Dean Moore	Dan Greaney & Allen Glazier	May 23, 2010	MABF15	5.75

=== Season 22 (2010–2011) ===
No. overall	No. in season	Title	Directed by	Written by	Original release date	Prod. code	U.S. viewers (millions)
465	1	"Elementary School Musical"	Mark Kirkland	Tim Long	September 26, 2010	MABF21	7.82
466	2	"Loan-a Lisa"	Matthew Faughnan	Valentina L. Garza	October 3, 2010	MABF17	8.63
467	3	"MoneyBart"	Nancy Kruse	Tim Long	October 10, 2010	MABF18	6.72
468	4	"Treehouse of Horror XXI"	Bob Anderson	Joel H. Cohen	November 7, 2010	MABF16	8.03
469	5	"Lisa Simpson, This Isn't Your Life"	Matthew Nastuk	Joel H. Cohen	November 14, 2010	MABF20	8.83
470	6	"The Fool Monty"	Steven Dean Moore	Michael Price	November 21, 2010	NABF01	6.59
471	7	"How Munched Is That Birdie in the Window?"	Mike Frank Polcino	Kevin Curran	November 28, 2010	NABF02	9.39
472	8	"The Fight Before Christmas"	Bob Anderson & Matthew Schofield	Deb Lacusta & Dan Castellaneta	December 5, 2010	MABF22	9.54
473	9	"Donnie Fatso"	Ralph Sosa	Chris Cluess	December 12, 2010	MABF19	7.19
474	10	"Moms I'd Like to Forget"	Chris Clements	Brian Kelley	January 9, 2011	NABF03	12.55
475	11	"Flaming Moe"	Chuck Sheetz	Matt Selman	January 16, 2011	NABF04	6.38
476	12	"Homer the Father"	Mark Kirkland	Joel H. Cohen	January 23, 2011	NABF05	6.48
477	13	"The Blue and the Gray"	Bob Anderson	Rob LaZebnik	February 13, 2011	NABF06	5.49
478	14	"Angry Dad: The Movie"	Matthew Nastuk	John Frink	February 20, 2011	NABF07	6.24
479	15	"The Scorpion's Tale"	Matthew Schofield	Billy Kimball & Ian Maxtone-Graham	March 6, 2011	NABF08	6.13
480	16	"A Midsummer's Nice Dream"	Steven Dean Moore	Deb Lacusta & Dan Castellaneta	March 13, 2011	NABF09	5.42
481	17	"Love Is a Many Strangled Thing"	Mike Frank Polcino	Bill Odenkirk	March 27, 2011	NABF10	6.05
482	18	"The Great Simpsina"	Chris Clements	Matt Warburton	April 10, 2011	NABF11	5.06
483	19	"The Real Housewives of Fat Tony"	Lance Kramer	Dick Blasucci	May 1, 2011	NABF12	5.84
484	20	"Homer Scissorhands"	Mark Kirkland	Peter Gaffney & Steve Viksten	May 8, 2011	NABF13	5.52
485	21	"500 Keys"	Bob Anderson	John Frink	May 15, 2011	NABF14	5.99
486	22	"The Ned-Liest Catch"	Chuck Sheetz	Jeff Westbrook	May 22, 2011	NABF15	5.30

=== Season 23 (2011–2012) ===
No. overall	No. in season	Title	Directed by	Written by	Original release date	Prod. code	U.S. viewers (millions)
487	1	"The Falcon and the D'ohman"	Matthew Nastuk	Justin Hurwitz	September 25, 2011	NABF16	8.08
488	2	"Bart Stops to Smell the Roosevelts"	Steven Dean Moore	Tim Long	October 2, 2011	NABF17	6.19
489	3	"Treehouse of Horror XXII"	Matthew Faughnan	Carolyn Omine	October 30, 2011	NABF19	8.10
490	4	"Replaceable You"	Mark Kirkland	Stephanie Gillis	November 6, 2011	NABF21	8.00
491	5	"The Food Wife"	Timothy Bailey	Matt Selman	November 13, 2011	NABF20	7.50
492	6	"The Book Job"	Bob Anderson	Dan Vebber	November 20, 2011	NABF22	5.77
493	7	"The Man in the Blue Flannel Pants"	Steven Dean Moore	Jeff Westbrook	November 27, 2011	PABF01	5.61
494	8	"The Ten-Per-Cent Solution"	Mike Frank Polcino	Deb Lacusta & Dan Castellaneta	December 4, 2011	PABF02	9.00
495	9	"Holidays of Future Passed"	Rob Oliver	J. Stewart Burns	December 11, 2011	NABF18	6.43
496	10	"Politically Inept, with Homer Simpson"	Mark Kirkland	John Frink	January 8, 2012	PABF03	5.07
497	11	"The D'oh-cial Network"	Chris Clements	J. Stewart Burns	January 15, 2012	PABF04	11.48
498	12	"Moe Goes from Rags to Riches"	Bob Anderson	Tim Long	January 29, 2012	PABF05	5.03
499	13	"The Daughter Also Rises"	Chuck Sheetz	Rob LaZebnik	February 12, 2012	PABF06	4.26
500	14	"At Long Last Leave"	Matthew Nastuk	Michael Price	February 19, 2012	PABF07	5.77
501	15	"Exit Through the Kwik-E-Mart"	Steven Dean Moore	Marc Wilmore	March 4, 2012	PABF09	5.09
502	16	"How I Wet Your Mother"	Lance Kramer	Billy Kimball & Ian Maxtone-Graham	March 11, 2012	PABF08	4.97
503	17	"Them, Robot"	Mike Frank Polcino	Michael Price	March 18, 2012	PABF10	5.25
504	18	"Beware My Cheating Bart"	Mark Kirkland	Ben Joseph	April 15, 2012	PABF11	4.96
505	19	"A Totally Fun Thing Bart Will Never Do Again"	Chris Clements	Matt Warburton	April 29, 2012	PABF12	5.00
506	20	"The Spy Who Learned Me"	Bob Anderson	Marc Wilmore	May 6, 2012	PABF13	4.84
507	21	"Ned 'n' Edna's Blend Agenda"	Chuck Sheetz	Jeff Westbrook	May 13, 2012	PABF15	4.07
508	22	"Lisa Goes Gaga"	Matthew Schofield	Tim Long	May 20, 2012	PABF14	4.82

=== Season 24 (2012–2013) ===
No. overall	No. in season	Title	Directed by	Written by	Original release date	Prod. code	U.S. viewers (millions)
509	1	"Moonshine River"	Bob Anderson	Tim Long	September 30, 2012	PABF21	8.08
510	2	"Treehouse of Horror XXIII"	Steven Dean Moore	David Mandel & Brian Kelley	October 7, 2012	PABF17	6.57
511	3	"Adventures in Baby-Getting"	Rob Oliver	Bill Odenkirk	November 4, 2012	PABF18	5.54
512	4	"Gone Abie Gone"	Matthew Nastuk	Joel H. Cohen	November 11, 2012	PABF16	6.86
513	5	"Penny-Wiseguys"	Mark Kirkland	Michael Price	November 18, 2012	PABF19	5.06
514	6	"A Tree Grows in Springfield"	Timothy Bailey	Stephanie Gillis	November 25, 2012	PABF22	7.46
515	7	"The Day the Earth Stood Cool"	Matthew Faughnan	Matt Selman	December 9, 2012	PABF20	7.44
516	8	"To Cur with Love"	Steven Dean Moore	Carolyn Omine	December 16, 2012	RABF01	3.77
517	9	"Homer Goes to Prep School"	Mark Kirkland	Brian Kelley	January 6, 2013	RABF02	8.97
518	10	"A Test Before Trying"	Chris Clements	Joel H. Cohen	January 13, 2013	RABF03	5.04
519	11	"The Changing of the Guardian"	Bob Anderson	Rob LaZebnik	January 27, 2013	RABF04	5.23
520	12	"Love Is a Many-Splintered Thing"	Mike Frank Polcino	Tim Long	February 10, 2013	RABF07	4.19
521	13	"Hardly Kirk-ing"	Matthew Nastuk	Tom Gammill & Max Pross	February 17, 2013	RABF05	4.57
522	14	"Gorgeous Grampa"	Chuck Sheetz	Matt Selman	March 3, 2013	RABF06	4.66
523	15	"Black Eyed, Please"	Matthew Schofield	John Frink	March 10, 2013	RABF09	4.85
524	16	"Dark Knight Court"	Mark Kirkland	Billy Kimball & Ian Maxtone-Graham	March 17, 2013	RABF10	4.89
525	17	"What Animated Women Want"	Steven Dean Moore	J. Stewart Burns	April 14, 2013	RABF08	4.11
526	18	"Pulpit Friction"	Chris Clements	Bill Odenkirk	April 28, 2013	RABF11	4.54
527	19	"Whiskey Business"	Matthew Nastuk	Valentina L. Garza	May 5, 2013	RABF13	4.43
528	20	"The Fabulous Faker Boy"	Bob Anderson	Brian McConnachie	May 12, 2013	RABF12	4.16
529	21	"The Saga of Carl"	Chuck Sheetz	Eric Kaplan	May 19, 2013	RABF14	4.01
530	22	"Dangers on a Train"	Steven Dean Moore	Michael Price	May 19, 2013	RABF17	4.52

=== Season 25 (2013–2014) ===
No. overall	No. in season	Title	Directed by	Written by	Original release date	Prod. code	U.S. viewers (millions)
531	1	"Homerland"	Bob Anderson	Stephanie Gillis	September 29, 2013	RABF20	6.37
532	2	"Treehouse of Horror XXIV"	Rob Oliver	Jeff Westbrook	October 6, 2013	RABF16	6.42
533	3	"Four Regrettings and a Funeral"	Mark Kirkland	Marc Wilmore	November 3, 2013	RABF18	5.43
534	4	"YOLO"	Mike Frank Polcino	Michael Nobori	November 10, 2013	RABF22	4.20
535	5	"Labor Pains"	Matthew Faughnan	Don Payne & Mitchell H. Glazer	November 17, 2013	RABF19	4.08
536	6	"The Kid Is All Right"	Mark Kirkland	Tim Long	November 24, 2013	SABF02	6.78
537	7	"Yellow Subterfuge"	Bob Anderson	Joel H. Cohen	December 8, 2013	SABF04	6.85
538	8	"White Christmas Blues"	Steven Dean Moore	Don Payne	December 15, 2013	SABF01	8.48
539	9	"Steal This Episode"	Matthew Nastuk	J. Stewart Burns	January 5, 2014	SABF05	12.04
540	10	"Married to the Blob"	Chris Clements	Tim Long	January 12, 2014	SABF03	4.83
541	11	"Specs and the City"	Lance Kramer	Brian Kelley	January 26, 2014	SABF06	3.87
542	12	"Diggs"	Mike Frank Polcino	Dan Greaney & Allen Glazier	March 9, 2014	SABF08	2.69
543	13	"The Man Who Grew Too Much"	Matthew Schofield	Jeff Westbrook	March 9, 2014	SABF07	3.75
544	14	"The Winter of His Content"	Chuck Sheetz	Kevin Curran	March 16, 2014	SABF09	4.02
545	15	"The War of Art"	Steven Dean Moore	Rob LaZebnik	March 23, 2014	SABF10	3.98
546	16	"You Don't Have to Live Like a Referee"	Mark Kirkland	Michael Price	March 30, 2014	SABF11	3.91
547	17	"Luca$"	Chris Clements	Carolyn Omine	April 6, 2014	SABF12	4.30
548	18	"Days of Future Future"	Bob Anderson	J. Stewart Burns	April 13, 2014	SABF13	3.64
549	19	"What to Expect When Bart's Expecting"	Matthew Nastuk	John Frink	April 27, 2014	SABF14	3.45
550	20	"Brick Like Me"	Matthew Nastuk	Brian Kelley	May 4, 2014	RABF21	4.39
551	21	"Pay Pal"	Mike Frank Polcino	David H. Steinberg	May 11, 2014	SABF15	3.66
552	22	"The Yellow Badge of Cowardge"	Timothy Bailey	Billy Kimball & Ian Maxtone-Graham	May 18, 2014	SABF18	3.28

=== Season 26 (2014–2015) ===
No. overall	No. in season	Title	Directed by	Written by	Original release date	Prod. code	U.S. viewers (millions)
553	1	"Clown in the Dumps"	Steven Dean Moore	Joel H. Cohen	September 28, 2014	SABF20	8.53
554	2	"The Wreck of the Relationship"	Chuck Sheetz	Jeff Westbrook	October 5, 2014	SABF17	4.27
555	3	"Super Franchise Me"	Mark Kirkland	Bill Odenkirk	October 12, 2014	SABF19	7.33
556	4	"Treehouse of Horror XXV"	Matthew Faughnan	Stephanie Gillis	October 19, 2014	SABF21	7.76
557	5	"Opposites A-Frack"	Matthew Nastuk	Valentina L. Garza	November 2, 2014	SABF22	4.22
558	6	"Simpsorama"	Bob Anderson	J. Stewart Burns	November 9, 2014	SABF16	6.70
559	7	"Blazed and Confused"	Rob Oliver	Carolyn Omine & William Wright	November 16, 2014	TABF01	6.70
560	8	"Covercraft"	Steven Dean Moore	Matt Selman	November 23, 2014	TABF02	3.45
561	9	"I Won't Be Home for Christmas"	Mark Kirkland	Al Jean	December 7, 2014	TABF03	6.52
562	10	"The Man Who Came to Be Dinner"	David Silverman	Al Jean & David Mirkin	January 4, 2015	RABF15	10.62
563	11	"Bart's New Friend"	Bob Anderson	Judd Apatow	January 11, 2015	TABF05	4.28
564	12	"The Musk Who Fell to Earth"	Matthew Nastuk	Neil Campbell	January 25, 2015	TABF04	3.29
565	13	"Walking Big & Tall"	Chris Clements	Michael Price	February 8, 2015	TABF06	2.78
566	14	"My Fare Lady"	Mike Frank Polcino	Marc Wilmore	February 15, 2015	TABF07	2.67
567	15	"The Princess Guide"	Timothy Bailey	Brian Kelley	March 1, 2015	TABF08	3.93
568	16	"Sky Police"	Rob Oliver	Matt Selman	March 8, 2015	TABF09	3.79
569	17	"Waiting for Duffman"	Steven Dean Moore	John Frink	March 15, 2015	TABF10	3.59
570	18	"Peeping Mom"	Mark Kirkland	John Frink	April 19, 2015	TABF11	3.23
571	19	"The Kids Are All Fight"	Bob Anderson	Rob LaZebnik	April 26, 2015	TABF12	3.33
572	20	"Let's Go Fly a Coot"	Chris Clements	Jeff Westbrook	May 3, 2015	TABF13	3.12
573	21	"Bull-E"	Lance Kramer	Tim Long	May 10, 2015	TABF15	2.77
574	22	"Mathlete's Feat"	Mike Frank Polcino	Michael Price	May 17, 2015	TABF16	2.82

=== Season 27 (2015–2016) ===
No. overall	No. in season	Title	Directed by	Written by	Original release date	Prod. code	U.S. viewers (millions)
575	1	"Every Man's Dream"	Matthew Nastuk	J. Stewart Burns	September 27, 2015	TABF14	3.28
576	2	"Cue Detective"	Timothy Bailey	Joel H. Cohen	October 4, 2015	TABF17	6.02
577	3	"Puffless"	Rob Oliver	J. Stewart Burns	October 11, 2015	TABF19	3.31
578	4	"Halloween of Horror"	Mike B. Anderson	Carolyn Omine	October 18, 2015	TABF22	3.69
579	5	"Treehouse of Horror XXVI"	Steven Dean Moore	Joel H. Cohen	October 25, 2015	TABF18	6.75
580	6	"Friend with Benefit"	Matthew Faughnan	Rob LaZebnik	November 8, 2015	TABF21	3.48
581	7	"Lisa with an 'S'"	Bob Anderson	Stephanie Gillis	November 22, 2015	TABF20	5.64
582	8	"Paths of Glory"	Steven Dean Moore	Michael Ferris	December 6, 2015	VABF01	5.53
583	9	"Barthood"	Rob Oliver	Dan Greaney	December 13, 2015	VABF02	5.97
584	10	"The Girl Code"	Chris Clements	Rob LaZebnik	January 3, 2016	VABF03	4.41
585	11	"Teenage Mutant Milk-Caused Hurdles"	Timothy Bailey	Joel H. Cohen	January 10, 2016	VABF04	8.33
586	12	"Much Apu About Something"	Bob Anderson	Michael Price	January 17, 2016	VABF05	3.95
587	13	"Love Is in the N_{2}-O_{2}-Ar-CO_{2}-Ne-He-CH_{4}"	Mark Kirkland	John Frink	February 14, 2016	VABF07	2.89
588	14	"Gal of Constant Sorrow"	Matthew Nastuk	Carolyn Omine	February 21, 2016	VABF06	3.10
589	15	"Lisa the Veterinarian"	Steven Dean Moore	Dan Vebber	March 6, 2016	VABF08	3.09
590	16	"The Marge-ian Chronicles"	Chris Clements	Brian Kelley	March 13, 2016	VABF09	3.07
591	17	"The Burns Cage"	Rob Oliver	Rob LaZebnik	April 3, 2016	VABF10	2.32
592	18	"How Lisa Got Her Marge Back"	Bob Anderson	Jeff Martin	April 10, 2016	VABF11	2.55
593	19	"Fland Canyon"	Mike Frank Polcino	J. Stewart Burns	April 24, 2016	VABF12	2.77
594	20	"To Courier with Love"	Timothy Bailey	Bill Odenkirk	May 8, 2016	VABF14	2.52
595	21	"Simprovised"	Matthew Nastuk	John Frink	May 15, 2016	VABF13	2.80
596	22	"Orange Is the New Yellow"	Matthew Faughnan	Eric Horsted	May 22, 2016	VABF15	2.54

=== Season 28 (2016–2017) ===
No. overall	No. in season	Title	Directed by	Written by	Original release date	Prod. code	U.S. viewers (millions)
597	1	"Monty Burns' Fleeing Circus"	Matthew Nastuk	Tom Gammill & Max Pross	September 25, 2016	VABF20	3.36
598	2	"Friends and Family"	Lance Kramer	J. Stewart Burns	October 2, 2016	VABF18	6.00
599	3	"The Town"	Rob Oliver	Dave King	October 9, 2016	VABF17	3.22
600	4	"Treehouse of Horror XXVII"	Steven Dean Moore	Joel H. Cohen	October 16, 2016	VABF16	7.44
601	5	"Trust but Clarify"	Mike Frank Polcino	Harry Shearer	October 23, 2016	VABF21	3.36
602	6	"There Will Be Buds"	Matthew Faughnan	Matt Selman	November 6, 2016	VABF22	3.14
603	7	"Havana Wild Weekend"	Bob Anderson	Deb Lacusta, Dan Castellaneta & Peter Tilden	November 13, 2016	VABF19	7.13
604	8	"Dad Behavior"	Steven Dean Moore	Ryan Koh	November 20, 2016	WABF01	2.88
605	9	"The Last Traction Hero"	Bob Anderson	Bill Odenkirk	December 4, 2016	WABF03	5.77
606	10	"The Nightmare After Krustmas"	Rob Oliver	Jeff Westbrook	December 11, 2016	WABF02	5.60
607	11	"Pork and Burns"	Matthew Nastuk	Rob LaZebnik	January 8, 2017	WABF06	8.19
608	12	"The Great Phatsby" (Vol. I & Vol. II)	Chris Clements	Dan Greaney; Matt Selman (part 2 only)	January 15, 2017	WABF04	6.90
609	13	"The Great Phatsby" (Vol. I & Vol. II)	Timothy Bailey	Dan Greaney; Matt Selman (part 2 only)	January 15, 2017	WABF05	6.90
610	14	"Fatzcarraldo"	Mark Kirkland	Michael Price	February 12, 2017	WABF07	2.40
611	15	"The Cad and the Hat"	Steven Dean Moore	Ron Zimmerman	February 19, 2017	WABF08	2.44
612	16	"Kamp Krustier"	Rob Oliver	David M. Stern	March 5, 2017	WABF09	2.56
613	17	"22 for 30"	Chris Clements	Joel H. Cohen	March 12, 2017	WABF10	2.61
614	18	"A Father's Watch"	Bob Anderson	Simon Rich	March 19, 2017	WABF11	2.40
615	19	"The Caper Chase"	Lance Kramer	Jeff Westbrook	April 2, 2017	WABF12	2.13
616	20	"Looking for Mr. Goodbart"	Mike Frank Polcino	Carolyn Omine	April 30, 2017	WABF13	2.30
617	21	"Moho House"	Matthew Nastuk	Jeff Martin	May 7, 2017	WABF14	2.34
618	22	"Dogtown"	Steven Dean Moore	J. Stewart Burns	May 21, 2017	WABF15	2.15

=== Season 29 (2017–2018) ===
No. overall	No. in season	Title	Directed by	Written by	Original release date	Prod. code	U.S. viewers (millions)
619	1	"The Serfsons"	Rob Oliver	Brian Kelley	October 1, 2017	WABF17	3.26
620	2	"Springfield Splendor"	Matthew Faughnan	Tim Long & Miranda Thompson	October 8, 2017	WABF22	5.25
621	3	"Whistler's Father"	Matthew Faughnan	Tom Gammill & Max Pross	October 15, 2017	WABF16	2.91
622	4	"Treehouse of Horror XXVIII"	Timothy Bailey	John Frink	October 22, 2017	WABF18	3.66
623	5	"Grampy Can Ya Hear Me"	Bob Anderson	Bill Odenkirk	November 5, 2017	WABF19	2.86
624	6	"The Old Blue Mayor She Ain't What She Used to Be"	Matthew Nastuk	Tom Gammill & Max Pross	November 12, 2017	WABF20	4.75
625	7	"Singin' in the Lane"	Mike Frank Polcino	Ryan Koh	November 19, 2017	WABF21	2.67
626	8	"Mr. Lisa's Opus"	Steven Dean Moore	Al Jean	December 3, 2017	XABF01	4.28
627	9	"Gone Boy"	Rob Oliver	John Frink	December 10, 2017	XABF02	6.06
628	10	"Haw-Haw Land"	Bob Anderson	Tim Long & Miranda Thompson	January 7, 2018	XABF03	6.95
629	11	"Frink Gets Testy"	Chris Clements	Dan Vebber	January 14, 2018	XABF04	8.04
630	12	"Homer Is Where the Art Isn't"	Timothy Bailey	Kevin Curran	March 18, 2018	XABF05	2.10
631	13	"3 Scenes Plus a Tag from a Marriage"	Matthew Nastuk	Tom Gammill & Max Pross	March 25, 2018	XABF06	2.15
632	14	"Fears of a Clown"	Steven Dean Moore	Michael Price	April 1, 2018	XABF08	2.06
633	15	"No Good Read Goes Unpunished"	Mark Kirkland	Jeff Westbrook	April 8, 2018	XABF07	2.15
634	16	"King Leer"	Chris Clements	Daniel Furlong & Zach Posner	April 15, 2018	XABF10	2.26
635	17	"Lisa Gets the Blues"	Bob Anderson	David Silverman & Brian Kelley	April 22, 2018	XABF11	2.19
636	18	"Forgive and Regret"	Rob Oliver	Bill Odenkirk	April 29, 2018	XABF09	2.47
637	19	"Left Behind"	Lance Kramer	Story by : Al Jean; Teleplay by : Joel H. Cohen & John Frink	May 6, 2018	XABF12	2.15
638	20	"Throw Grampa from the Dane"	Mike Frank Polcino	Rob LaZebnik	May 13, 2018	XABF13	2.14
639	21	"Flanders' Ladder"	Matthew Nastuk	J. Stewart Burns	May 20, 2018	XABF14	2.10

=== Season 30 (2018–2019) ===
No. overall	No. in season	Title	Directed by	Written by	Original release date	Prod. code	U.S. viewers (millions)
640	1	"Bart's Not Dead"	Bob Anderson	Stephanie Gillis	September 30, 2018	XABF19	3.24
641	2	"Heartbreak Hotel"	Steven Dean Moore	Renee Ridgeley & Matt Selman	October 7, 2018	XABF15	4.60
642	3	"My Way or the Highway to Heaven"	Rob Oliver	Dan Castellaneta, Deb Lacusta & Vince Waldron	October 14, 2018	XABF17	2.52
643	4	"Treehouse of Horror XXIX"	Matthew Faughnan	Joel H. Cohen	October 21, 2018	XABF16	2.95
644	5	"Baby You Can't Drive My Car"	Timothy Bailey	Rob LaZebnik	November 4, 2018	XABF18	5.08
645	6	"From Russia Without Love"	Matthew Nastuk	Michael Ferris	November 11, 2018	XABF20	2.35
646	7	"Werking Mom"	Mike Frank Polcino	Carolyn Omine & Robin Sayers	November 18, 2018	XABF21	4.34
647	8	"Krusty the Clown"	Matthew Faughnan	Ryan Koh	November 25, 2018	XABF22	2.11
648	9	"Daddicus Finch"	Steven Dean Moore	Al Jean	December 2, 2018	YABF01	4.33
649	10	"'Tis the 30th Season"	Lance Kramer	Story by : Jeff Westbrook; Teleplay by : John Frink & Joel H. Cohen	December 9, 2018	YABF02	7.53
650	11	"Mad About the Toy"	Rob Oliver	Michael Price	January 6, 2019	YABF03	2.33
651	12	"The Girl on the Bus"	Chris Clements	Joel H. Cohen	January 13, 2019	YABF04	8.20
652	13	"I'm Dancing as Fat as I Can"	Matthew Nastuk	Jane Becker	February 10, 2019	YABF06	1.75
653	14	"The Clown Stays in the Picture"	Timothy Bailey	Matt Selman	February 17, 2019	YABF05	2.75
654	15	"101 Mitigations"	Mark Kirkland	Story by : Rob LaZebnik; Teleplay by : Brian Kelley & Dan Vebber	March 3, 2019	YABF07	2.25
655	16	"I Want You (She's So Heavy)"	Steven Dean Moore	Jeff Westbrook	March 10, 2019	YABF08	2.21
656	17	"E My Sports"	Rob Oliver	Rob LaZebnik	March 17, 2019	YABF09	2.08
657	18	"Bart vs. Itchy & Scratchy"	Chris Clements	Megan Amram	March 24, 2019	YABF10	1.99
658	19	"Girl's in the Band"	Jennifer Moeller	Nancy Cartwright	March 31, 2019	YABF11	2.07
659	20	"I'm Just a Girl Who Can't Say D'oh"	Mike Frank Polcino	Jeff Martin & Jenna Martin	April 7, 2019	YABF12	1.61
660	21	"D'oh Canada"	Matthew Nastuk	Tim Long & Miranda Thompson	April 28, 2019	YABF14	1.93
661	22	"Woo-Hoo Dunnit?"	Steven Dean Moore	Brian Kelley	May 5, 2019	YABF15	1.79
662	23	"Crystal Blue-Haired Persuasion"	Matthew Faughnan	Megan Amram	May 12, 2019	YABF16	1.50

=== Season 31 (2019–2020) ===
No. overall	No. in season	Title	Directed by	Written by	Original release date	Prod. code	U.S. viewers (millions)
663	1	"The Winter of Our Monetized Content"	Bob Anderson	Ryan Koh	September 29, 2019	YABF19	2.33
664	2	"Go Big or Go Homer"	Matthew Faughnan	John Frink	October 6, 2019	YABF21	5.63
665	3	"The Fat Blue Line"	Mike Frank Polcino	Bill Odenkirk	October 13, 2019	YABF22	2.13
666	4	"Treehouse of Horror XXX"	Timothy Bailey	J. Stewart Burns	October 20, 2019	YABF18	5.42
667	5	"Gorillas on the Mast"	Matthew Nastuk	Max Cohn	November 3, 2019	YABF20	2.02
668	6	"Marge the Lumberjill"	Rob Oliver	Ryan Koh	November 10, 2019	ZABF02	5.00
669	7	"Livin La Pura Vida"	Timothy Bailey	Brian Kelley	November 17, 2019	ZABF03	2.08
670	8	"Thanksgiving of Horror"	Rob Oliver	Dan Vebber	November 24, 2019	YABF17	5.42
671	9	"Todd, Todd, Why Hast Thou Forsaken Me?"	Chris Clements	Tim Long & Miranda Thompson	December 1, 2019	ZABF04	1.99
672	10	"Bobby, It's Cold Outside"	Steven Dean Moore	John Frink & Jeff Westbrook	December 15, 2019	ZABF01	4.97
673	11	"Hail to the Teeth"	Mark Kirkland	Elisabeth Kiernan Averick	January 5, 2020	ZABF05	1.81
674	12	"The Miseducation of Lisa Simpson"	Matthew Nastuk	J. Stewart Burns	February 16, 2020	ZABF06	1.95
675	13	"Frinkcoin"	Steven Dean Moore	Rob LaZebnik	February 23, 2020	ZABF07	1.84
676	14	"Bart the Bad Guy"	Jennifer Moeller	Dan Vebber	March 1, 2020	ZABF08	1.66
677	15	"Screenless"	Mike Frank Polcino	J. Stewart Burns	March 8, 2020	ZABF09	1.63
678	16	"Better Off Ned"	Rob Oliver	Story by : Al Jean; Teleplay by : Joel H. Cohen & Jeff Westbrook	March 15, 2020	ZABF11	1.70
679	17	"Highway to Well"	Chris Clements	Carolyn Omine	March 22, 2020	ZABF10	1.66
680	18	"The Incredible Lightness of Being a Baby"	Bob Anderson	Tom Gammill & Max Pross	April 19, 2020	YABF13	1.58
681	19	"Warrin' Priests" (Parts 1 & 2)	Bob Anderson	Pete Holmes	April 26, 2020	ZABF12	1.35
682	20	"Warrin' Priests" (Parts 1 & 2)	Matthew Nastuk	Pete Holmes	May 3, 2020	ZABF13	1.36
683	21	"The Hateful Eight-Year-Olds"	Jennifer Moeller	Joel H. Cohen	May 10, 2020	ZABF14	1.40
684	22	"The Way of the Dog"	Matthew Faughnan	Carolyn Omine	May 17, 2020	ZABF16	1.89

=== Season 32 (2020–2021) ===
No. overall	No. in season	Title	Directed by	Written by	Original release date	Prod. code	U.S. viewers (millions)
685	1	"Undercover Burns"	Bob Anderson	David Cryan	September 27, 2020	ZABF19	4.44
686	2	"I, Carumbus"	Rob Oliver	Cesar Mazariegos	October 4, 2020	ZABF18	1.51
687	3	"Now Museum, Now You Don't"	Timothy Bailey	Dan Greaney	October 11, 2020	ZABF21	1.36
688	4	"Treehouse of Horror XXXI"	Steven Dean Moore	Julia Prescott	November 1, 2020 (Note: This episode was originally scheduled to air on October 18, 2020, but was preempted as a result of the 2020 National League Championship Series running overtime. However, the episode was screened on October 14, 2020, at "Paley Front Row: Simpsons Treehouse of Horror," a panel discussion hosted by Decider, Paley Center for Media, and Fox. The episode still aired on its originally scheduled air date in Canada on Citytv.)	ZABF17	4.93
689	5	"The 7 Beer Itch"	Mike Frank Polcino	Story by : Al Jean; Teleplay by : Joel H. Cohen & John Frink	November 8, 2020	ZABF15	1.74
690	6	"Podcast News"	Matthew Faughnan	David X. Cohen	November 15, 2020	ZABF22	3.50
691	7	"Three Dreams Denied"	Steven Dean Moore	Danielle Weisberg	November 22, 2020	QABF02	4.41
692	8	"The Road to Cincinnati"	Matthew Nastuk	Jeff Westbrook	November 29, 2020	ZABF20	1.63
693	9	"Sorry Not Sorry"	Rob Oliver	Nell Scovell	December 6, 2020	QABF01	1.66
694	10	"A Springfield Summer Christmas for Christmas"	Timothy Bailey	Jessica Conrad	December 13, 2020	QABF03	3.92
695	11	"The Dad-Feelings Limited"	Chris Clements	Ryan Koh	January 3, 2021	QABF04	1.89
696	12	"Diary Queen"	Matthew Nastuk	Jeff Westbrook	February 21, 2021 (Note: This episode was originally scheduled to air on February 14, 2021, in the United States but was preempted due to rain delays during the 2021 Daytona 500, which prompted new episodes meant to air that night to be shown next Sunday night.)	QABF05	1.43
697	13	"Wad Goals"	Mike Frank Polcino	Brian Kelley	February 28, 2021	QABF06	1.24
698	14	"Yokel Hero"	Rob Oliver	Jeff Martin & Samantha Martin	March 7, 2021	QABF07	1.38
699	15	"Do Pizza Bots Dream of Electric Guitars"	Jennifer Moeller	Michael Price	March 14, 2021	QABF08	1.43
700	16	"Manger Things"	Steven Dean Moore	Rob LaZebnik	March 21, 2021	QABF09	1.28
701	17	"Uncut Femmes"	Chris Clements	Christine Nangle	March 28, 2021	QABF10	1.22
702	18	"Burger Kings"	Lance Kramer	Rob LaZebnik	April 11, 2021	QABF11	1.24
703	19	"Panic on the Streets of Springfield"	Matthew Nastuk	Tim Long	April 18, 2021	QABF12	1.31
704	20	"Mother and Child Reunion"	Jennifer Moeller	J. Stewart Burns	May 9, 2021	QABF14	1.11
705	21	"The Man from G.R.A.M.P.A."	Mike Frank Polcino	Carolyn Omine	May 16, 2021	QABF13	1.06
706	22	"The Last Barfighter"	Timothy Bailey	Dan Vebber	May 23, 2021	QABF15	1.02

=== Season 33 (2021–2022) ===
No. overall	No. in season	Title	Directed by	Written by	Original release date	Prod. code	U.S. viewers (millions)
707	1	"The Star of the Backstage"	Rob Oliver	Elisabeth Kiernan Averick	September 26, 2021	QABF17	3.48
708	2	"Bart's in Jail!"	Steven Dean Moore	Nick Dahan	October 3, 2021	QABF18	1.48
709	3	"Treehouse of Horror XXXII"	Matthew Faughnan	John Frink	October 10, 2021	QABF16	3.94
710	4	"The Wayz We Were"	Matthew Nastuk	Joel H. Cohen	October 17, 2021	QABF19	1.51
711	5	"Lisa's Belly"	Timothy Bailey	Juliet Kaufman	October 24, 2021	QABF20	1.83
712	6	"A Serious Flanders" (Parts 1 & 2)	Debbie Bruce Mahan	Cesar Mazariegos	November 7, 2021	QABF21	3.47
713	7	"A Serious Flanders" (Parts 1 & 2)	Matthew Faughnan	Cesar Mazariegos	November 14, 2021	QABF22	1.66
714	8	"Portrait of a Lackey on Fire"	Steven Dean Moore	Rob LaZebnik & Johnny LaZebnik	November 21, 2021	UABF01	3.97
715	9	"Mothers and Other Strangers"	Rob Oliver	Al Jean	November 28, 2021	UABF02	3.61
716	10	"A Made Maggie"	Timothy Bailey	Elisabeth Kiernan Averick	December 19, 2021	UABF03	3.90
717	11	"The Longest Marge"	Matthew Nastuk	Brian Kelley	January 2, 2022	UABF05	2.02
718	12	"Pixelated and Afraid"	Chris Clements	John Frink	February 27, 2022	UABF04	1.41
719	13	"Boyz N the Highlands"	Bob Anderson	Dan Vebber	March 6, 2022	UABF06	1.53
720	14	"You Won't Believe What This Episode Is About – Act Three Will Shock You!"	Jennifer Moeller	Christine Nangle	March 13, 2022	UABF07	1.14
721	15	"Bart the Cool Kid"	Steven Dean Moore	Ryan Koh	March 20, 2022	UABF08	1.04
722	16	"Pretty Whittle Liar"	Mike Frank Polcino	Joel H. Cohen	March 27, 2022	UABF09	1.10
723	17	"The Sound of Bleeding Gums"	Chris Clements	Loni Steele Sosthand	April 10, 2022	UABF10	0.95
724	18	"My Octopus and a Teacher"	Rob Oliver	Carolyn Omine	April 24, 2022	UABF11	0.97
725	19	"Girls Just Shauna Have Fun"	Matthew Nastuk	Jeff Westbrook	May 1, 2022	UABF12	1.03
726	20	"Marge the Meanie"	Timothy Bailey	Megan Amram	May 8, 2022	UABF15	0.85
727	21	"Meat Is Murder"	Bob Anderson	Michael Price	May 15, 2022	UABF13	1.00
728	22	"Poorhouse Rock"	Jennifer Moeller	Tim Long	May 22, 2022	UABF14	0.93

=== Season 34 (2022–2023) ===
No. overall	No. in season	Title	Directed by	Written by	Original release date	Prod. code	U.S. viewers (millions)
729	1	"Habeas Tortoise"	Matthew Faughnan	Broti Gupta	September 25, 2022	UABF16	4.15
730	2	"One Angry Lisa"	Matthew Nastuk	Jessica Conrad	October 2, 2022	UABF19	1.46
731	3	"Lisa the Boy Scout"	Timothy Bailey	Dan Greaney	October 9, 2022	UABF21	3.43
732	4	"The King of Nice"	Debbie Bruce Mahan	Jessica Conrad	October 16, 2022	UABF20	1.16
733	5	"Not It"	Steven Dean Moore	Cesar Mazariegos	October 23, 2022	UABF17	3.63
734	6	"Treehouse of Horror XXXIII"	Rob Oliver	Carolyn Omine & Ryan Koh & Matt Selman	October 30, 2022	UABF18	3.95
735	7	"From Beer to Paternity"	Rob Oliver	Christine Nangle	November 13, 2022	OABF01	4.77
736	8	"Step Brother from the Same Planet"	Matthew Faughnan	Dan Vebber	November 20, 2022	UABF22	1.21
737	9	"When Nelson Met Lisa"	Steven Dean Moore	Ryan Koh	November 27, 2022	OABF02	1.53
738	10	"Game Done Changed"	Timothy Bailey	Ryan Koh	December 4, 2022	OABF03	1.16
739	11	"Top Goon"	Chris Clements	Joel H. Cohen	December 11, 2022	OABF04	3.42
740	12	"My Life as a Vlog"	Debbie Bruce Mahan	Jessica Conrad	January 1, 2023	OABF05	1.02
741	13	"The Many Saints of Springfield"	Bob Anderson	Al Jean	February 19, 2023	OABF06	1.37
742	14	"Carl Carlson Rides Again"	Mike Frank Polcino	Loni Steele Sosthand	February 26, 2023	OABF07	1.18
743	15	"Bartless"	Rob Oliver	John Frink	March 5, 2023	OABF08	0.93
744	16	"Hostile Kirk Place"	Steven Dean Moore	Michael Price	March 12, 2023	OABF09	0.77
745	17	"Pin Gal"	Chris Clements	Jeff Westbrook	March 19, 2023	OABF10	0.86
746	18	"Fan-ily Feud"	Timothy Bailey	Broti Gupta	April 23, 2023	OABF11	1.00
747	19	"Write Off This Episode"	Matthew Nastuk	J. Stewart Burns	April 30, 2023	OABF12	0.89
748	20	"The Very Hungry Caterpillars"	Gabriel DeFrancesco	Brian Kelley	May 7, 2023	OABF14	0.82
749	21	"Clown V. Board of Education"	Lance Kramer	Jeff Westbrook	May 14, 2023	OABF15	0.77
750	22	"Homer's Adventures Through the Windshield Glass"	Bob Anderson	Tim Long	May 21, 2023	OABF13	0.87

=== Season 35 (2023–2024) ===
No. overall	No. in season	Title	Directed by	Written by	Original release date	Prod. code	U.S. viewers (millions)
751	1	"Homer's Crossing"	Steven Dean Moore	Cesar Mazariegos	October 1, 2023	OABF18	3.58
752	2	"A Mid-Childhood Night's Dream"	Matthew Faughnan	Carolyn Omine	October 8, 2023	OABF16	1.17
753	3	"McMansion & Wife"	Debbie Bruce Mahan	Dan Vebber	October 22, 2023	OABF20	1.06
754	4	"Thirst Trap: A Corporate Love Story"	Timothy Bailey	Rob LaZebnik	October 29, 2023	OABF21	1.12
755	5	"Treehouse of Horror XXXIV"	Rob Oliver	Jeff Westbrook & Jessica Conrad & Dan Vebber	November 5, 2023	OABF17	4.38
756	6	"Iron Marge"	Matthew Faughnan	Mike Scully	November 12, 2023	OABF22	1.92
757	7	"It's a Blunderful Life"	Matthew Nastuk	Elisabeth Kiernan Averick	November 19, 2023	OABF19	1.11
758	8	"Ae Bonny Romance"	Matthew Nastuk	Michael Price	December 3, 2023	35ABF02	3.16
759	9	"Murder, She Boat"	Chris Clements	Broti Gupta	December 17, 2023	35ABF04	2.08
760	10	"Do the Wrong Thing"	Rob Oliver	Joel H. Cohen	December 24, 2023	35ABF01	5.41
761	11	"Frinkenstein's Monster"	Steven Dean Moore	Joel H. Cohen	February 18, 2024	35ABF03	0.76
762	12	"Lisa Gets an F1"	Timothy Bailey	Ryan Koh	February 25, 2024	35ABF05	0.87
763	13	"Clan of the Cave Mom"	Rob Oliver	Brian Kelley	March 24, 2024	35ABF06	0.69
764	14	"Night of the Living Wage"	Chris Clements	Cesar Mazariegos	April 7, 2024	35ABF07	0.83
765	15	"Cremains of the Day"	Gabriel DeFrancesco	John Frink	April 21, 2024	35ABF09	0.97
766	16	"The Tell-Tale Pants"	Steven Dean Moore	Al Jean	May 5, 2024	35ABF10	0.85
767	17	"The Tipping Point"	Matthew Nastuk	J. Stewart Burns	May 12, 2024	35ABF11	0.72
768	18	"Bart's Brain"	Mike Frank Polcino	Dan Vebber	May 19, 2024	35ABF12	0.62

=== Season 36 (2024–2025) ===
No. overall	No. in season (Note: Episodes without an episode number within the season constitute exclusive episodes commissioned and released by Disney+.)	Title	Directed by	Written by	Original release date	Prod. code	U.S. viewers (millions)
769	1	"Bart's Birthday"	Rob Oliver	Jessica Conrad	September 29, 2024	35ABF15	1.08
770	2	"The Yellow Lotus"	Matthew Faughnan	Loni Steele Sosthand	October 6, 2024	35ABF08	0.89
771	3	"Desperately Seeking Lisa"	Matthew Nastuk	Tim Long	October 20, 2024	35ABF18	2.02
772	4	"Shoddy Heat"	Gabriel DeFrancesco	Jeff Westbrook	October 27, 2024	35ABF16	0.98
773	5	"Treehouse of Horror XXXV"	Timothy Bailey	Rob LaZebnik & Dan Vebber & Matt Selman	November 3, 2024	35ABF13	3.18
774	6	"Women in Shorts"	Eric Koenig	Christine Nangle	November 10, 2024	35ABF17	0.83
775	7	"Treehouse of Horror Presents: Simpsons Wicked This Way Comes"	Debbie Bruce Mahan	Jessica Conrad	November 24, 2024	35ABF14	2.69
776	8	"Convenience Airways"	Rob Oliver	Loni Steele Sosthand	December 8, 2024	36ABF01	1.70
777	9	"Homer and Her Sisters"	Matthew Nastuk	Nick Dahan	December 15, 2024	36ABF03	1.47
778	–	"O C'mon All Ye Faithful"	Debbie Bruce Mahan	Carolyn Omine	December 17, 2024	35ABF21	N/A
779	–	"O C'mon All Ye Faithful"	Matthew Faughnan	Carolyn Omine	December 17, 2024	35ABF22	N/A
780	10	"The Man Who Flew Too Much"	Steven Dean Moore	Al Jean	December 22, 2024	36ABF02	0.91
781	11	"Bottle Episode"	Gabriel DeFrancesco	Rob LaZebnik & Johnny LaZebnik	December 29, 2024	36ABF04	3.31
782	–	"The Past and the Furious"	Mike Frank Polcino	Rob LaZebnik	February 12, 2025	35ABF19	N/A
783	12	"The Flandshees of Innersimpson"	Chris Clements	Dan Vebber	March 30, 2025	36ABF05	0.62
784	13	"The Last Man Expanding"	Timothy Bailey	J. Stewart Burns	April 6, 2025	36ABF06	0.69
785	14	"P.S. I Hate You"	Mike Frank Polcino	Cesar Mazariegos	April 13, 2025	36ABF07	0.59
786	–	"Yellow Planet"	Timothy Bailey	J. Stewart Burns	April 22, 2025	35ABF20	N/A
787	15	"Abe League of Their Moe"	Rob Oliver	Joel H. Cohen	April 27, 2025	36ABF08	0.73
788	16	"Stew Lies"	Debbie Bruce Mahan	Broti Gupta	May 4, 2025	36ABF09	0.63
789	17	"Full Heart, Empty Pool"	Chris Clements	Jeff Westbrook	May 11, 2025	36ABF10	0.69
790	18	"Estranger Things"	Matthew Nastuk	Tim Long	May 18, 2025	36ABF11	0.54

=== Season 37 (2025–2026) ===
No. overall	No. in season	Title	Directed by	Written by	Original release date	Prod. code	U.S. viewers (millions)
791	1	"Thrifty Ways to Thieve Your Mother"	Gabriel DeFrancesco	Jessica Conrad	September 28, 2025	36ABF13	1.10
792	2	"Keep Chalm and Gary On"	Timothy Bailey	Christine Nangle	October 5, 2025	36ABF14	3.04
793	3	"Treehouse of Horror XXXVI"	Matthew Faughnan	Broti Gupta & Michael Price & Dan Greaney	October 19, 2025	36ABF15	4.08
794	4	"Men Behaving Manly"	Steven Dean Moore	John Frink	October 26, 2025	36ABF12	1.05
795	5	"Bad Boys... for Life?"	Eric Koenig	Al Jean	November 2, 2025	36ABF17	1.13
796	6	"Bart 'N' Frink"	Rob Oliver	Brian Kelley	November 9, 2025	36ABF16	1.99
797	7	"Sashes to Sashes"	Mike Frank Polcino	Ryan Koh	November 16, 2025	36ABF18	0.89
798	8	"The Day of the Jack-up"	Mike Frank Polcino	Joel H. Cohen	November 23, 2025	37ABF01	2.46
799	9	"Aunt Misbehavin'"	Gabriel DeFrancesco	Juliet Kaufman	November 30, 2025	37ABF02	1.15
800 (Note: Multiple episodes are considered the 800th episode. See The Simpsons season 37 § 800th episode for further details.)	10	"Guess Who's Coming to Skinner"	Rob Oliver	John Frink	December 7, 2025	37ABF04	3.69
801	11	"Parahormonal Activity"	Chris Clements	Loni Steele Sosthand	December 14, 2025	37ABF03	1.50
802	12	"¡The Fall Guy-Yi-Yi!"	Timothy Bailey	Cesar Mazariegos	December 28, 2025	37ABF06	2.61
803	13	"Seperance"	Matthew Nastuk	Jeff Westbrook	January 4, 2026	37ABF07	0.88
804	14	"Irrational Treasure"	Debbie Bruce Mahan	Christine Nangle	February 15, 2026	37ABF08	1.19
805	15	"Homer? A Cracker Bro?"	Chris Clements	Ryan Koh	February 15, 2026	37ABF05	1.14
806	–	"Extreme Makeover: Homer Edition"	Matthew Nastuk	Michael Price	June 17, 2026	36ABF20	N/A
807	–	"Extreme Makeover: Homer Edition"	Timothy Bailey	Nick Dahan	June 17, 2026	36ABF21	N/A
808	–	"Simpsley"	Debbie Bruce Mahan	Cesar Mazariegos	July 3, 2026	36ABF19	N/A
809	–	"Yellow Mirror"	Matthew Faughnan	Carolyn Omine & Kai Omine	August 26, 2026	36ABF22	N/A

=== Season 38 (2026) ===
No. overall	No. in season	Title	Directed by	Written by	Original release date	Prod. code	U.S. viewers (millions)
810	1	"The Children's Book Job"	Matthew Nastuk	Dan Vebber	September 27, 2026	37ABF10	1.03
811	2	"Diary of a Chimpy Kid"	Timothy Bailey	Rob LaZebnik	October 4, 2026	37ABF09	1.01
812	3	"Treehouse of Horror Presents: The Revengening"	Eddie Rosas	Nick Dahan	October 18, 2026	37ABF13	0.98
813	4	"Treehouse of Horror XXXVII"	David Silverman	Joel H. Cohen & Jessica Conrad & Tim Long	October 25, 2026	37ABF14	4.11
814	5	"Testing 1-2-3"	Matthew Faughnan	J. Stewart Burns	November 1, 2026	37ABF12	0.96
815	6	"The Kosmic Kruiser"	Mike Frank Polcino	Brian Kelley	November 8, 2026	37ABF11	2.16
816	7	"Dream Scenari-Moe"	Eric Koenig	Broti Gupta	November 15, 2026	37ABF15	TBD
817	8	"Curb Your Expectations"	TBA	TBA	November 22, 2026	TBA	TBD
818	9	"Jersey Score"	TBA	TBA	November 29, 2026	TBA	TBD
819	10	"Don't Marge with Texas"	TBA	TBA	December 6, 2026	TBA	TBD
820	11	"Bog"	TBA	TBA	December 13, 2026	TBA	TBD
821	12	"The Offendables"	TBA	TBA	December 20, 2026	TBA	TBD
822	13	"Lock, Stock and One Stupid Narrator"	TBA	TBA	December 27, 2026	TBA	TBD
823	14	"Billionaire on the Bayou"	TBA	TBA	January 3, 2027	TBA	TBD
824	15	"Lenny Goes Squiggy"	TBA	TBA	January 3, 2027	TBA	TBD

== Upcoming episodes without a scheduled premiere date ==
Title	Written by	Prod. code
"Marge and Homer and Moe and Maya"	Al Jean	TBA
"The Beautiful Shame"	TBA	TBA
"Planet Simpsons"	Dan Vebber	38ABF03
"Treehouse of Horror XXXVIII"	Loni Steele Sosthand	38ABF07
"Maximum Overtime"	TBA	38ABF08
	John Frink	38ABF09
"The Never-Owning Story"	TBA	38ABF10
"Cloud Fatlas"	TBA	38ABF30/31
"That 2000's Show"	Christine Nangle	38ABF33

== See also ==
- The Simpsons Tracey Ullman shorts
- The Simpsons Disney+ shorts
- "The Simpsons Guy" – a crossover episode of Family Guy
- The Simpsons home media
