= Ice Cream of Margie (with the Light Blue Hair) =

- The Simpsons episode
- Episode no.: Season 18; Episode 7
- Directed by: Matthew Nastuk
- Written by: Carolyn Omine
- Production code: HABF22
- Original air date: November 26, 2006

Episode features
- Couch gag: The family's eyes are visible in the dark; when the lights come up, the Simpsons are revealed to be cockroaches, who scuttle away (except Maggie, who hides behind the couch).
- Commentary: Al Jean; Carolyn Omine; Matt Selman; Michael Price; Matt Warburton; Tom Gammill; Max Pross; David Silverman; Chuck Sheetz

Episode chronology
← Previous "Moe'N'a Lisa"	Next → "The Haw-Hawed Couple"
- The Simpsons season 18

"Ice Cream of Margie (with the Light Blue Hair)" is the seventh episode of the eighteenth season of the American animated television series The Simpsons. It originally aired on the Fox network in the United States on November 26, 2006. The episode was written by Carolyn Omine and directed by Matthew Nastuk.

In the episode, Homer gets fired from the nuclear power plant yet again and takes over an ice cream truck business, while a depressed Marge creates Popsicle-stick sculptures to keep busy. The sculptures quickly become popular, and Marge is excited to have a purpose in life until a turn of events divides the Simpsons household. In its original run, the episode received 10.90 million viewers and received mixed reviews.

== Plot ==
During a chair hockey game at the power plant with office supplies, Mr. Burns chastises Homer for behaving unprofessionally during the game. Homer gets in more trouble when an ice cream truck passes by the plant, causing him to fantasize that Mr. Burns is an ice cream cone and try to lick him, resulting in Homer being fired as he runs towards the ice cream truck. Homer uses a $100 bill to buy a 25 cent ice cream from the ice cream man, Max, who collapses and dies of a fatal heart attack while changing the bill into coins. Max's widow sells the truck to Homer, and Homer has Otto remodel it à la Pimp My Ride. Meanwhile, the television series Opal — Springfield's version of The Oprah Winfrey Show — has a show about successful women, which sends Marge into a deep depression, as she feels she has not done anything memorable with her life. Marge is inspired by all the Popsicle sticks Homer brings home, and makes sculptures out of them.

Kent Brockman sees the sculptures and interviews Marge, who says she creates them, so they will serve as a reminder of her when she is gone. Kent includes her on a news special, Kent Brockman's Kentresting People. Thanks to the publicity, Rich Texan creates an art show to showcase Marge's talent; however, it opens on Saturday, a day with high ice cream sales. Homer promises to return by 3 o'clock to see the art show. He loses track of time and hurries home, but accidentally crashes into his own lawn in the process, destroying all of Marge's sculptures. Marge says that Homer has ruined her dreams and locks herself in the bedroom.

Several days later, Homer tries to express how bad he feels by slipping pictures of himself under the door, but falls asleep. When he wakes up, Marge is gone and Grampa is looking after Bart and Lisa, who tell him that Marge left hours ago. Marge is on top of city hall, where she declares she will show the world how she feels about Homer. She reveals the largest Popsicle sculpture she has ever made, and the subject is Homer. Marge realizes that Homer tried to keep his promise to her and make it on time, not that he did not care, much to the shock of a nearby Opal. Marge apologizes to Homer for the way that she acted, Homer apologizes for ruining her sculptures, and the two reunite. The scene shifts 200 years into the future, where the Homer sculpture is the only remaining element of Western art in a world where iPods have conquered humanity, whipping them with headphones for a hobby.

== Cultural references ==
The scene where Homer gets dressed in his ice cream man uniform is a reference to the opening of television series Da Ali G Show where Ali G dresses the same way.

The episode's title is a play on the song title "Jeanie with the Light Brown Hair".

== Reception ==
=== Viewing figures ===
In its original run, the episode received 10.90 million viewers.

=== Critical response ===
Dan Iverson of IGN deemed the entire episode boring and said it had no general quality to make it interesting. He enjoyed Carl Carlson's line to Lenny Leonard: "See, statements like that are why people think we're gay." He also appreciated the Ali G parody. He gave the episode a final rating of 5.2/10. Adam Finley of TV Squad gave the episode a negative review, and said that it was boring.

Colin Jacobson of DVD Movie Guide said that it was better than the previous episode, but it seemed "dopier than I'd like at times."

On Four Finger Discount, Guy Davis and Brendan Dando thought writer Carolyn Omine handled the Homer and Marge argument well without making Homer's poor behavior the primary reason as in previous episodes.

=== Themes and analysis ===
Zachary Tavlin stated that this episode demonstrates the Aristotelian friendship between Lenny and Carl due to "constant proximity and exclusivity". In the episode, the popsicle stick sculptures of them prompts Lenny to say he cannot tell where Carl ends and he begins while Carl says his statement makes people think they are homosexuals.
