= Carolyn Omine =

Television writer

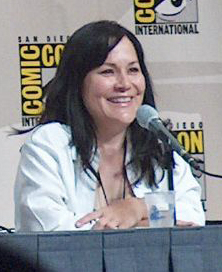
- Omine in 2008
- Occupation: television writer
- Notable work: The Simpsons
- Awards: 4 Emmy Awards

Carolyn Omine is an American television writer. She wrote seven episodes of Full House during its final two seasons (1993 - 1995). Since 2000 she has been a writer and producer on The Simpsons, for which she has written 28 episodes and won five Primetime Emmy Awards for Outstanding Animated Program (2000, 2001, 2003, 2006, 2023) from 12 nominations.

== Writing credits ==
=== The Simpsons episodes ===
Omine has written the following episodes:

- "Little Big Mom" (2000)
- "Treehouse of Horror XI" ("Night of the Dolphin") (2000)
- "The Great Money Caper" (2000)
- "Treehouse of Horror XII" ("Wiz Kids") (2001)
- "Sweets and Sour Marge" (2002)
- "Strong Arms of the Ma" (2003)
- "Smart & Smarter" (2004)
- "A Star Is Torn" (2005)
- "Ice Cream of Margie (with the Light Blue Hair)" (2006)
- "The Homer of Seville" (2007)
- "Dial 'N' for Nerder" (with William Wright as co-writer) (2008)
- "The Great Wife Hope" (2009)
- "Chief of Hearts" (with William Wright as co-writer) (2010)
- "Treehouse of Horror XXII" (2011)
- "To Cur with Love" (2012)
- "Luca$" (2014)
- "Blazed and Confused" (with William Wright as co-writer) (2014)
- "Halloween of Horror" (2015)
- "Gal of Constant Sorrow" (2016)
- "Looking for Mr. Goodbart" (2017)
- "Werking Mom" (with Robin Sayers as co-writer) (2018)
- "Highway to Well" (2020)
- "The Way of the Dog" (2020)
- "The Man from G.R.A.M.P.A." (2021)
- "My Octopus and a Teacher" (2022)
- "Treehouse of Horror XXXIII" (2022) (with Ryan Koh and Matt Selman as co-writers)
- "A Mid-Childhood Night's Dream" (2023)
- "O C'mon All Ye Faithful" (2024)
- ”Yellow Mirror” (2026)

=== Full House episodes ===
Omine has written the following episodes:

- "Smash Club: The Next Generation" (1993)
- "Is It True About Stephanie" (1994)
- "A House Divided (1994)" (Teleplay with Adam I. Lapidus)
- "Making Out Is Hard To Do" (1994)
- "Arrest Ye Merry Gentlemen" (1994)
- "All Stood Up (1995)" (Teleplay with Adam I. Lapidus)
- "Michelle Rides Again" (1995) (Teleplay)
