= Habeas Tortoise =

- The Simpsons episode
- Episode no.: Season 34; Episode 1
- Directed by: Matthew Faughnan
- Written by: Broti Gupta
- Production code: UABF16
- Original air date: September 25, 2022

Guest appearances
- Joe Mantegna as Fat Tony; Jay Pharoah as Drederick Tatum

Episode features
- Couch gag: Dinosaur Game

Episode chronology
← Previous "Poorhouse Rock"	Next → "One Angry Lisa"
- The Simpsons season 34

"Habeas Tortoise" is the thirty-fourth season premiere of the American animated television series The Simpsons, and the 729th episode overall. It aired in the United States on Fox on September 25, 2022. The episode was directed by Matthew Faughnan and written by Broti Gupta.

In this episode, Homer finds community when looking for a missing zoo tortoise, but the group begins to postulate more extreme ideas. The episode received positive reviews.

== Plot ==
Homer is publicly humiliated at a town meeting, ashamed that people think he is dumb. To make him feel better, Marge takes him on a trip to the zoo where he is excited to see a tortoise named Slow Leonard, only to find that the tortoise is missing. Determined to solve the mystery and to prove his intelligence, Homer reviews pictures from the trip and finds dolly tracks near Leonard's habitat, suspecting that he was stolen. He presents the clue to Chief Wiggum, who does not take him seriously.

At Marge's suggestion, Homer finds a group about Slow Leonard on Facelook and posts his theory, which is positively received by group members Comic Book Guy, Gil Gunderson, Ms. Hoover, Sideshow Mel and Drederick Tatum. Live-streaming his theories from the zoo to his Facelook friends, he recruits Superintendent Chalmers for his group, and invites his friends over to collaborate and exchange ideas. After Homer protests outside the zookeeper's house, during which an interested Wiggum joins the group and Gil proposes to Hoover, Marge worries that Homer is taking his conspiracy theories too far, but he says that he enjoys the company of his group.

Homer soon inadvertently finds Slow Leonard while exploring a rabbit burrow after a protest. Fearful that he will lose his friends if the mystery is solved, Homer tries to keep Leonard secret, but during Gil and Hoover's wedding reception, he overhears his group coming up with increasingly violent ideas on how to get information from the zookeeper, whom Homer knows is innocent. Horrified, he and Marge confess that they have found Slow Leonard. The group worry that they may drift apart having nothing in common besides solving conspiracies, so Homer quickly comes up with a new conspiracy theory—the source of calamari—which they discuss at his house while unknowingly being spied on by the Illuminati.

During the credits, Homer posts a TikTok video showcasing a paella recipe.

== Production ==
This is the first episode of the series written by Broti Gupta, and it was originally titled "Habeus Tortoise." The episode is a parody of the television documentary series Don't F**k with Cats: Hunting an Internet Killer. The topic of conspiracy theories had previously been addressed in the twelfth season episode "The Computer Wore Menace Shoes." Executive producer Matt Selman noted that although conspiracy theories used to be entertaining as demonstrated in the prior episode, contemporary conspiracy theory communities had become detached from reality, and this episode is used to show the danger of not accepting the truth. The producers also wanted to show empathy for the groups of people who come together for certain causes. The paella scene was used to show the power of community building.

The "Dinosaur Game" couch gag was made by Katrin von Niederhäusern and Janine Wiget. Von Niederhäusern and Wiget first came to the producers' attention after they created a live-action shot-by-shot remake of the eating montage from the twenty-ninth season episode "Lisa Gets the Blues."

== Cultural references ==
The title of the episode is a reference to the Habeas corpus.

A song sung by Superintendent Chalmers is a parody of Sam Cooke's "Wonderful World."

== Reception ==
=== Viewing figures ===
The episode earned a 1.41 rating and was watched by 4.15 million viewers. This is up from the previous season premiere (3.48 million viewers).

=== Critical response ===
Tony Sokol of Den of Geek gave the episode 4 out of 5 stars, stating "Every line is witty, and the setup is ridiculously brilliant in its skewering of the communities which cycle around fake news and ad hoc conjecture. Villainy is thwarted by armchair detectives who finally get off the couch, but Homer could have solved it sitting down. Clever more than comic, The Simpsons season 34 opener provides chuckles in a nuanced offering which is less than classic."

Marcus Gibson of Bubbleblabber gave the episode a 7.5 out of 10 stating, "It's no conspiracy that 'Habeus Tortoise' is a decently enjoyable start to the show's 34th season. There's nothing too special about Homer's search for acceptance. Still, the season premiere offers a humorous trip down the Conspiracy Hole that exposes the dangers of providing false theories and pokes fun at them. If I were to make my own conspiracy theory, it would be that the rest of the season would be as fun as this episode."
