= Top Goon =

- The Simpsons episode
- Episode no.: Season 34; Episode 11
- Directed by: Chris Clements
- Written by: Joel H. Cohen
- Production code: OABF04
- Original air date: December 11, 2022

Guest appearances
- Will Forte as King Toot; Stu Grimson as himself; Joe Mantegna as Fat Tony; Dave Schultz as himself; Tiger Williams as himself

Episode chronology
| ← Previous "Game Done Changed" | Next → "My Life as a Vlog" |
- The Simpsons season 34

"Top Goon" is the eleventh episode of the thirty-fourth season of the American animated television series The Simpsons, and the 739th episode overall. It aired in the United States on Fox on December 11, 2022. The episode was directed by Chris Clements and written by Joel H. Cohen.

In this episode, Moe recruits Nelson to his ice hockey team to protect Bart. The episode received positive reviews. Maggie Simpson does not appear in this episode. The series title does not appear in the episode. The episode opens with a cloud sequence with the text "Moe Szyslak" instead of "The Simpsons."

== Plot ==
Moe's neighbor, King Toot, shows off his trophy for coaching a winning children’s hockey team, which annoys Moe. The next season, Moe starts his own team with Bart as the best player. However, Bart is tackled by a player on King Toot’s team, and Moe’s team loses. When Moe notices Nelson bullying someone, he invites Nelson to be on the team.

Moe sends Nelson to Top Goon Academy to teach him how to be an enforcer. Nelson is taught that Bart is the primary, and he must always protect him. Nelson and Moe bond as they celebrate his graduation. When the team wins the next game, they have a victory party. Bart pranks Moe, which angers Nelson. He decides that Moe is the primary, and he breaks Bart’s arm. This enrages Moe, and he kicks Nelson off the team. Saddened that he is just a bully, Nelson joins Fat Tony’s gang.

When Moe visits Nelson’s mother to apologize, he learns that Nelson considers Moe to be the primary. Moe finds Nelson, who is about to attack King Toot for Fat Tony. Moe convinces Nelson to stop and come with him because he is more than just a bully. Moe steals King Toot’s trophy and gives it to Nelson.

== Production ==
Former ice hockey players Stu Grimson, Dave Schultz, and Tiger Williams appeared as themselves. The producers contacted the NHL Network, where Grimson works as an analyst, to ask for his involvement. Grimson recorded his lines in a studio in Nashville while receiving feedback from the producers over a video conference. He thought the producers selected him and the other former players because they have memorable nicknames. Grimson was able to attend a viewing of the season premiere in California. Grimson stated that the appearance would expose hockey to a different type of audience.

There was originally going to be a tie-in to the sixth season episode "Lisa on Ice."

== Cultural references ==
The story has a similar premise as 1992 film The Mighty Ducks. The hockey academy teaches the novel Beloved by Toni Morrison. The title of the episode is an homage to the 1986 action movie, Top Gun.

== Reception ==
=== Viewing figures ===
Due to the NFL doubleheader on Fox, the episode scored a 1.0 rating with 3.42 million viewers, which was the most viewed show on Fox that night.

=== Critical response ===
Tony Sokol of Den of Geek gave the episode 5 out of 5 stars. He praised the featuring of Nelson and Moe without the need for the characters to change, and highlighted the visual jokes. He also felt the ultimate message was optimistic.

Matthew Swigonski of Bubbleblabber gave the episode a 6 out of 10. He felt the story was fairly simple and has been done before but highlighted the Nelson and Moe relationship.
