= When Nelson Met Lisa =

- The Simpsons episode
- Episode no.: Season 34; Episode 9
- Directed by: Steven Dean Moore
- Written by: Ryan Koh
- Production code: OABF02
- Original air date: November 27, 2022

Guest appearances
- Simu Liu as Adult Hubert Wong; Natasha Lyonne as Sophie Krustofsky; Jackie Mason as Hyman Krustofsky Hologram (archive recording)

Episode features
- Commentary: Matt Selman: Steven Dean Moore

Episode chronology
← Previous "Step Brother from the Same Planet"	Next → "Game Done Changed"
- The Simpsons season 34

"When Nelson Met Lisa" is the ninth episode of the thirty-fourth season of the American animated television series The Simpsons, and the 737th episode overall. It aired in the United States on Fox on November 27, 2022. The episode was directed by Steven Dean Moore and written by Ryan Koh.

In this episode, Lisa and Nelson encounter each other at several different moments in the future and reflect on their lives. The episode guest stars Simu Liu as Adult Hubert Wong, Adult Lisa's tech billionaire boyfriend. The episode received mixed reviews. This is the third episode that focuses on Lisa's relationship with Nelson following "Lisa's Date with Density" and "Loan-a Lisa".

== Plot ==
In the future, Lisa is practicing her college commencement address when she spots Nelson. At Nelson's home in the university bell tower, they spend the night talking about the past. The next day, Lisa gives her speech as Nelson watches from the tower. After the ceremony, Lisa wonders what her life would be like if she was with Nelson, but she leaves without contacting him.

Five years has passed, and Lisa is now married to Hubert Wong. They encounter Nelson and his girlfriend, who are bounty hunters, as they capture a target. The two couples talk about their life stories. When Hubert is alone with Nelson, he gloats about how he has won Lisa's heart. This angers Nelson, and he gives Hubert a wedgie. Lisa witnesses this and thinks that Nelson is still the same person as when they were kids.

Another five years later, Lisa and Nelson run into each other and reminisce again. They are both single now. Suddenly Hubert appears and asks Lisa to take him back, using drones to impress her. Nelson encourages her to go with Hubert even though it saddens him.

At a wedding later, Lisa and Nelson see each other. While Hubert is distracted, Lisa and Nelson decide to be together, and they kiss.

== Production ==
At San Diego Comic-Con 2022, Co-showrunner Matt Selman announced Canadian actor Simu Liu will voice an Adult Hubert Wong, and will be Adult Lisa's rich boyfriend. Future Hubert was described to be a combination of tech billionaires.

Natasha Lyonne guest starred as Sophie Krustofsky. Jackie Mason appeared as Hyman Krustofsky via archival recording.

== Cultural references ==
The title and story are a parody of the 1989 film When Harry Met Sally... Nelson's home at the university refers to the novel The Hunchback of Notre-Dame.

- Adult Hubert Wong parodies the late billionaire and businessman Steve Jobs
- The ePhone67 is a parody of the iPhone
- Obese Chief Wiggum with his floating device is a parody of Baron Vladimir Harkonnen

== Reception ==
=== Viewing figures ===
The episode earned a 0.46 rating with 1.53 million viewers in its initial airing, which was second-most watched show on Fox that night.

=== Critical response ===
The episode received generally positive reviews from critics.

Reyan Mishra of The Review Geek, gave the episode a 3 out of 5 stars. Praising the chemistry between Nelson and Lisa, and the light humor.

Tony Sokol of Den of Geek gave the episode a 3.5 out of 5 stars. He stated that the episode is at its best when it refers to When Harry Met Sally. He thought adult Hubert was not fully realized and did not understand why he is with Lisa. He also said that the other Simpson family members had no reason to be in the episode.

Matthew Swigonski of Bubbleblabber gave the episode a 7.0 out of 10. He stated that the episode showed a familiar love story, but it added humor throughout the episode. He thought the depiction of two people trying to find love was relatable. He also thought the episode was rewarding for fans who have stayed with the series over its entire run.

Zack Zwiezen of Kotaku called the episode one of the ten worst episodes of the series. He thought the depiction of the character's futures was "boring" and did not laugh at the jokes. He also stated that the episode was a waste of time.
