= Game Done Changed =

- The Simpsons episode
- Episode no.: Season 34; Episode 10
- Directed by: Timothy Bailey
- Written by: Ryan Koh
- Production code: OABF03
- Original air date: December 4, 2022

Episode chronology
← Previous "When Nelson Met Lisa"	Next → "Top Goon"
- The Simpsons season 34

"Game Done Changed" is the tenth episode of the thirty-fourth season of the American animated television series The Simpsons, and the 738th episode overall. It aired in the United States on Fox on December 4, 2022. The episode was directed by Timothy Bailey and written by Ryan Koh.

In this episode, Bart discovers a glitch in the online game Boblox, and starts exploiting the glitch on old school computers to traffic money, with Principal Skinner getting in on the scheme. The episode received positive reviews.

== Plot ==
When Marge catches Bart playing a violent video game, she forces him to play a child-friendly computer game instead, throwing his VR set in the garbage disposal to ensure he cannot use it again. Bart and Milhouse discover a glitch in the game where if they sell an item for in-game currency, they keep a copy of the item. They devise a plan to have his schoolmates play the game to earn more currency. Marge also lets Maggie play the game. She realizes that Maggie can communicate with her using in-game emojis.

Principal Skinner catches the students playing the game on computers at school, and Bart bribes Skinner by turning some of the currency into real money, which can be used to fund the school. When Martin tries to expose them, Skinner threatens him. One day, they are attacked in the game by students from another school, who are also monetizing the glitch. Bart and Skinner go to the other school to negotiate. Bart agrees to a resolution by dividing up territory, but Skinner refuses and removes Bart from the scheme. Meanwhile, Homer and Lisa have joined Marge and Maggie in the game.

Skinner goes to war with the other school in the game. Because they are getting defeated, Skinner decides to bulldoze the other school. When Bart finds out, he is able to stop Skinner in time, and he comes to his senses.

Later, Ned Flanders checks in on the rest of the Simpsons and finds them all addicted to the video game, which frightens him.

== Production ==
In April 2022, the third episode of the 34th production season was revealed. Michael Price confirmed it and revealed Bart's major role in the episode.

Montse Hernandez guest starred as Astrid.

== Cultural references ==
The video game the characters are playing, Boblox is a parody of the online multiplayer video game Roblox. Bart is also playing a video game similar to Assassin's Creed. Principal Skinner quotes directly from the television series The Wire, and a student's father directed three episodes of the show.

== Reception ==
=== Viewing figures ===
The episode earned a 0.37 rating and was watched by 1.16 million viewers, which was the most watched show on Fox that night.

=== Critical response ===
The episode received mixed reviews from critics.

Tony Sokol of Den of Geek gave the episode 4.5 out of 5 stars. He enjoyed the humor and visual gags. He also liked that the plot was wholly new and not retreads of previous episodes.

Matthew Swigonski of Bubbleblabber gave the episode a 6.5 out of 10. He liked the concept and how the two storylines both involved the same video game. He also liked the dynamic between Bart and Skinner but felt the ending was too sweet.

Zack Zwiezen of Kotaku stated that writer Ryan Koh seemed familiar enough with video game culture that the plot was successfully authentic.
