= Bartless =

- The Simpsons episode
- Episode no.: Season 34; Episode 15
- Directed by: Rob Oliver
- Written by: John Frink
- Production code: OABF08
- Original air date: March 5, 2023

Guest appearance
- Kerry Washington as Rayshelle Peyton

Episode chronology
← Previous "Carl Carlson Rides Again"	Next → "Hostile Kirk Place"
- The Simpsons season 34

"Bartless" is the fifteenth episode of the thirty-fourth season of the American animated television series The Simpsons, and the 743rd episode overall. It aired in the United States on Fox on March 5, 2023. The episode was directed by Rob Oliver and written by John Frink.

In this episode, Homer and Marge wonder how their lives would be if Bart was never a Simpson. The episode received positive reviews.

== Plot ==
At school, Bart is reading to a shy kindergarten student, who is not interested in the story. He makes up a new story while drawing in the book, which inspires the kids to start drawing in their own books. Enraged, Homer and Marge scolds at Bart for ruining the books at school by calling him a "destroyer" while lamenting to his teacher how awful he is. However, they are shocked to learn that his actions with the books turned all the kids (even Ralph) into avid readers. Homer and Marge reevaluate their feelings towards their son and wonder if they have become resentful towards him because they are his parents. Both parents agree that they love Bart, but wonder if they like him.

The next day, Homer and Marge wake up in a world where Bart isn't born and live in a luxurious house. Marge is a veterinarian at a Grey's Anatomy-type animal hospital where she is the only one who does any work, and Homer is a stadium scoreboard operator. After a family outing, the family accidentally hits a boy named Bart with their car. He has amnesia, and they take him in until they figure out where he lives so he can go home.

Bart starts to annoy the family with his behavior. With Homer, he plays with the scoreboard controls and angers him, but the display is a huge hit and earns Homer a promotion. At the animal hospital, no one listens to Marge until she tells them to "eat my shorts." Bart and Lisa watch cartoons into the night. Homer and Marge see that Lisa is happier (having been the first time that they heard her genuinely laugh), and Maggie is also happy when Bart adds her into a story he makes up. Chief Wiggum comes to take Bart to an orphanage, and Homer and Marge run after Bart as Wiggum takes him away. They wake up and realize they had a dream, and they go to tell Bart that they now like him for who he is. Bart pauses and with suspicion asks with some edge about what it means that they "now" like him, and Homer and Marge look at each other with a despairing expression as the episode ends.

== Production ==
It was revealed to be in production on June 23, 2022.

Kerry Washington reprised her role as Rayshelle Peyton. The character was introduced in the thirty-third season episode "My Octopus and a Teacher."

== Cultural references ==
The book that Bart reads refers to the type of books written by Richard Scarry. The name of the animal hospital where Marge works refers to Shondaland, which produces the hospital drama Grey's Anatomy. The Itchy & Scratchy cartoon parodies The Great British Bakeoff with hosts Matt Lucas and Noel Fielding.

== Reception ==
=== Viewing figures ===
The episode earned a 0.23 rating and was watched by 0.93 million viewers, which was the most watched show on Fox that night.

=== Critical response ===
The episode received positive reviews from critics.

Tony Sokol of Den of Geek gave the episode a 4.5 out of 5 stars. He stated that the episode takes many dark turns to show how Bart is needed for the family dynamic. He also complimented Ralph's surreal adventure.

John Schwarz of Bubbleblabber gave the episode an 8 out of 10. He stated that although there are flaws in the plot, the jokes were enough to keep watching. He also highlighted the writing for the Bart character.

Jesse David Fox of Vulture stated that this episode stands with the best of the classic episodes. He said that the show was revisiting its relationship with Bart and felt like a reboot of the series.

Samuel Williamson of Collider said that the episode proved that the series has been creatively improving although it may not be as good as the early seasons. Williamson highlighted the risks the writers took with the alternate reality while showing the positive impact of Bart.
