= Mr. Lisa's Opus =

- The Simpsons episode
- Episode no.: Season 29; Episode 8
- Directed by: Steven Dean Moore
- Written by: Al Jean
- Production code: XABF01
- Original air date: December 3, 2017

Guest appearances
- Kat Dennings as Valerie; Valerie Harper as Ms. Myles; Norman Lear as himself; Kipp Lennon as Leon Kompowsky; Jon Lovitz as Artie Ziff

Episode features
- Couch gag: A statue of the family on the couch at the Lincoln Memorial with the mottos In Couch Gags We Trust and "Vescere Bracis Meis" (Latin for "Eat My Shorts"). It pans out to a penny held by Mr. Burns, who says to Homer, "Here's your raise". Homer then says "D'oh!"

Episode chronology
← Previous "Singin' in the Lane"	Next → "Gone Boy"
- The Simpsons season 29

"Mr. Lisa's Opus" is the eighth episode of the twenty-ninth season of the American animated television series The Simpsons, and the 626th episode of the series overall. The episode was directed by Steven Dean Moore and written by Al Jean. It aired in the United States on Fox on December 3, 2017. The title is a spoof of the film Mr. Holland's Opus.

In this episode, Lisa looks back through all her family's attempts to remember her birthday and uses those attempts to write an essay for Harvard. Kat Dennings, Valerie Harper, Kipp Lennon, and Jon Lovitz guest starred. Screenwriter and producer Norman Lear appeared as himself. The episode received mixed reviews.

== Plot ==
Seven years ago, baby Lisa exclaims numerous words, waking up Marge and Homer. Realizing she is a genius, Homer admires her, which offends Bart. Seventeen years later, Lisa writes her Harvard College admission essay and reflects on her past while coping with Bart being a disappointment. On her 7th birthday, the family and her teacher forget her birthday. She is sent to Principal Skinner after she gets sad when her class celebrates Hubert Wong's birthday but not hers. Homer gets her and remembers it is her birthday. At home, Ned gifts her a tricycle. The family celebrates her birthday with a bowl of cereal and milk with some candles on it.

On her 14th birthday, the family brings Leon Kompowsky to sing new verses for "Happy Birthday, Lisa" while Homer brings a cake for her twelfth birthday, which she corrects. Returning home from school, she places her gifts from school in Marge's closet but discovers a letter for Homer from Marge that says she is leaving him. At dinner, Marge gets angry at Homer for drinking in front of the kids and tells him to go to Moe's. Marge goes to the kitchen to cry. At Moe's, Lisa warns Homer that Marge is going to leave him and makes him promise to quit drinking. Homer calls his sponsor, Ned, to help him quit. He succeeds, and the marriage is saved.

Lisa sends her essay into Harvard, who admit her. They send a drone to Lisa with her acceptance. Drones from other universities appear, but the Harvard one destroys them.

Lisa goes to college and sets up her room, but her roommate makes her feel inferior. While taking a walk, Bart cheers her up, saying she will be better than everyone and urging her to make their parents proud. As the family leaves, Maggie holds an encouraging sign for her. Returning to her room, she meets a second roommate, who is also sulking at not being good enough. Lisa comforts her and learns they have a lot in common. Lisa believes she has a new friend and possibly more. A montage of Lisa's life is shown and returns to baby Lisa.

Homer, Marge, and baby Lisa sings a new version of "Those Were the Days" from All in the Family. Norman Lear enters the house and plans to sue them. A final tour of Springfield is shown during the credits which play the closing theme to All In the Family with the Duff Blimp saying "Stay tuned for Simpson and Son" (a spoof of Sanford and Son).

== Production ==
In July 2017, writer Al Jean said a future episode would look at Lisa's future and suggest that she may end up with another woman. However, since episodes set in the future are non-canon, this led to debate regarding Lisa's sexuality as an adult.

In March 2017, Entertainment Weekly reported that television producer Norman Lear would make a cameo as himself involving a theme song from one of his shows. Valerie Harper guest starred as Lisa's teacher for one sequence. Kat Dennings was cast as Lisa's college roommate.

== Reception ==
Dennis Perkins of The A.V. Club gave the episode a C, stating "Jean's script sends us chasing these different-aged Lisas through the years to no real purpose or effect. There are a few sweet moments that stand out more for their abrupt humanity in the face of the gimmickry as much as their emotional impact."

Tony Sokol of Den of Geek gave the episode 4.5/5 stars, saying, "'Mr. Lisa's Opus' is an epic comedy film parody, along the lines of, but funnier on a line-by-line basis than, last season's 'Barthood.' Even a short gag on an everlasting battle takes on historic relevance. The episode has its treacle, but Al Jean cuts it with brilliant subversion. Dan Castellaneta's voice of Homer is in its glory as a rapid fire laugh delivery system."

"Mr. Lisa's Opus" scored a 1.7 rating with a 6 share and was watched by 4.28 million viewers, making it Fox's highest rated show of the night.
