= Do the Wrong Thing (The Simpsons) =

- The Simpsons episode
- Episode no.: Season 35; Episode 10
- Directed by: Rob Oliver
- Written by: Joel H. Cohen
- Production code: 35ABF01
- Original air date: December 24, 2023

Guest appearances
- Ken Marino as Dean Belichick; Dan Patrick as Rock-Skipping Announcer

Episode chronology
| ← Previous "Murder, She Boat" | Next → "Frinkenstein's Monster" |
- The Simpsons season 35

"Do the Wrong Thing" is the tenth episode of the thirty-fifth season of the American animated television series The Simpsons, and the 760th episode overall. It aired in the United States on Fox on December 24, 2023. The episode was directed by Rob Oliver and written by Joel H. Cohen.

In this episode, Homer and Bart bond over cheating while Lisa applies to university camps. Ken Marino and Dan Patrick guest star. The episode received mixed reviews.

== Plot ==
Grampa is retiring as fishing champion and wants Homer to succeed him at the next competition. Meanwhile, Lisa is applying to university summer camps. Homer is worried because he never wins anything. At the competition, Homer struggles to catch a fish but finds a fish in his boat after it flips over. The fish is weighed as the heaviest, so Homer wins. While preparing the fish to be cooked, Homer finds marbles inside it. Bart admits to putting marbles in it, and Homer thanks him for cheating.

Homer brings Bart to various sporting competitions to help him cheat and win. Meanwhile, Lisa is worried because no one has replied to her applications. Lisa and Marge notice Homer and Bart's prizes from the competitions. Homer admits to Marge that he has been cheating, and he suggests that not cheating would hinder their children's opportunities. Later, Lisa is accepted to the University of Springfield camp's rowing team, which confuses her. She finds that her application contains altered photos of her rowing. At a competition, Lisa accuses Homer of cheating to get her into the camp and exposes his cheating to his competitors, which angers them.

After escaping from the competitors, Marge admits to being the one who cheated for Lisa. This shocks Homer and Bart, and they vow to stop cheating. They are kidnapped and taken to the University of Springfield where the dean says that all the admitted applicants are cheaters. Lisa refuses to attend. Seeing Homer's affinity for cheating, the dean offers Homer a job teaching it, but he also refuses. Later, it is shown that Bart is at the university teaching a class on cheating.

== Production ==
Writer Joel H. Cohen based the story on a video of a fishing tournament where the competitors cheated by inserting weights into the fish.

Sportscaster Dan Patrick guest starred as the rock-skipping announcer. Cohen and Patrick had written a book together about the National Football League. Ken Marino guest starred as Dean Belichick.

== Cultural references ==
The subplot of Lisa trying to be admitted to a pre-college program is a reference to the Varsity Blues scandal. The initials of the University of Springfield Camp to which Lisa is admitted match the initials of the University of Southern California, which was involved in the Varsity Blues scandal. There is also a reference to the photos of actress Lori Loughlin's daughters on rowing machines to qualify them to be admitted for the USC rowing team.

The university's Dean Belichick refers to football coach Bill Belichick, who, as the head coach of the New England Patriots, was a figure in the Spygate and Deflategate scandals. Belichick was fined $500,000 for recording opposing coaches' signals in the former scandal. He was not punished for deflating footballs in the latter scandal.

Bart is shown teaching at the "Jim Harbaugh Center for Competitive Imbalance," which refers to the head coach of the Michigan Wolverines football team. A member of Harbaugh's staff was involved with the Michigan Wolverines football sign-stealing scandal. Although Harbaugh has not been implicated, he was suspended for three games. The university also has a building called Sam Bankman-Fried Hall, referring to his fraud charges.

The episode also refers to the Houston Astros sign stealing scandal, the Lance Armstrong doping allegations, and issues involved with LIV Golf.

== Reception ==
=== Viewing figures ===
Leading out of an NFL doubleheader, the episode earned a preliminary 1.46 18-49 rating with 5.41 million viewers, which was the most-watched show on Fox that night. The figure was later adjusted to 6.268 million viewers with a 1.80 18-49 rating, winning its timeslot in both total viewers and the 18-49 demo, as well as the highest rated episode of the season.

=== Critical reception ===
John Schwarz of Bubbleblabber gave the episode an 8 out of 10. He liked the performances by the guest stars and the jokes about sports in the United States. He would have preferred more commentary about the people involved in the Varsity Blues scandal.

Mike Celestino of Laughing Place thought the episode was "middle-of-the-road." He liked how the subplot became intertwined with the main plot, but he was not sure why the episode was airing the day before Christmas.
