= Singin' in the Lane =

- The Simpsons episode
- Episode no.: Season 29; Episode 7
- Directed by: Mike Frank Polcino
- Written by: Ryan Koh
- Production code: WABF21
- Original air date: November 19, 2017

Episode features
- Chalkboard gag: "We do not live in our own pee" (written by Bart as a fish, in a sunken ship)
- Couch gag: An underwater-themed version of the standard opening sequence with the characters as sea animals. When the family (as various fish) sits on the couch, it is placed into a crab trap.

Episode chronology
← Previous "The Old Blue Mayor She Ain't What She Used to Be"	Next → "Mr. Lisa's Opus"
- The Simpsons season 29

"Singin' in the Lane" is the seventh episode of the twenty-ninth season of the American animated television series The Simpsons, and the 625th episode of the series overall. The episode was directed by Mike Frank Polcino and written by Ryan Koh. It aired in the United States on Fox on November 19, 2017.

In this episode, Homer's bowling team, the Pin Pals, faces a rival team of bankers, and Moe bets his bar that the Pin Pals will beat them. The episode received mixed reviews. It features a reference to the 1952 hit film Singin' in the Rain.

== Plot ==
The family is enjoying their dinner when Mr. Burns calls Homer to invite him to a basketball game, having been turned down by a long list of Springfield residents and celebrities when he made the offer to them. Homer receives four tickets and decides to bring Lenny, Carl, and Barney along while the four are at Moe's Tavern. Seeing how upset Moe is at being left out, Homer decides to revive the Pin Pals bowling team with himself, Lenny, Carl, and Barney as members and Moe as their captain.

The Pin Pals perform well in competition and secure a berth for the state finals in Capital City, but develop a rivalry with a team of investment bankers called the Fund Bunch. Bart quickly takes a liking to their callous psychological manipulation and bullying of others, while Lisa allies herself with a geeky team called the Number Crunchers to find weaknesses in their character that she can exploit. To stop this behavior, Moe offers a wager to the Fund Bunch. If the Pin Pals win, the Fund Bunch must give them something that only rich people have; otherwise, Moe will lose his bar and change his name.

Before the final match, Homer lets slip the fact that Barney's bowling skills deteriorate greatly when he is drunk. The Fund Bunch tricks Barney into drinking expensive bourbon, leaving him unable to bowl. Bart and Lisa reconcile, and Lisa uses the Number Crunchers' findings to throw the Fund Bunch off their game. Homer takes Barney's place for the tenth and final frame, needing three strikes to win. Moe tries to stop Homer, imagining the prospect of being able to start a new and better life in France if he loses his bar, but Homer nevertheless bowls the strikes and wins the championship for the Pin Pals.

Feeling rejected by his friends for being a bad coach, a depressed Moe returns to the bar but finds the other four waiting to surprise him, saying that they are still a team and his friends. The Fund Bunch arranges for the Pin Pals to take a zero-gravity plane flight, during which Homer struggles to float inside the cabin due to his weight while the others do so easily.

== Cultural references ==
When Moe imagines being a bartender in Paris, the scene parodies Manet’s A Bar at the Folies-Bergère. One of the bankers is the model for The Wolf of Wall Street.

== Reception ==
Dennis Perkins of The A.V. Club gave the episode a C+, stating "Apart from not having a clear purpose, there are pleasures to be found in 'Singin’ In The Lane'. The episode looks especially bright and crisp, and the different locations and the uniforms give the visuals an eye-catching vitality. Azaria really is quite affecting as Moe, even though lines like ‘I just gotta go back to the worst thing in the world—bein’ me’ rely more on performance and character history for their effect, rather than the meager motivation they’re given in the episode. And credit where it’s due, as rehashes go, 'Singin In The Lane' isn’t the stone bummer last season’s long-delayed return to Kamp Krusty was. Instead, this revival is simply too inconsequential to make much of an impression at all, which is its own kind of disappointing".

Tony Sokol of Den of Geek gave the episode 3 out of 5 stars. He stated that most of the laughs came in the first half of the episode but seemed to run of out ideas in the second half.

"Singin' in the Lane" scored a 1.1 rating with a 4 share and was watched by 2.67 million people, making it Fox's highest rated show of the night.
