= Treehouse of Horror XXXIII =

- The Simpsons episode
- Episode no.: Season 34; Episode 6
- Directed by: Rob Oliver
- Written by: "The Pookadook": Carolyn Omine; "Death Tome": Ryan Koh; "Simpsons World": Matt Selman
- Production code: UABF18
- Original air date: October 30, 2022

Guest appearances
- John Roberts as Linda Belcher; Hank Williams Jr. sings "Canyonero!"

Episode chronology
← Previous "Not It"	Next → "From Beer to Paternity"
- The Simpsons season 34

"Treehouse of Horror XXXIII" is the sixth episode of the thirty-fourth season of the American animated television series The Simpsons, and the 734th episode overall. It aired in the United States on Fox on October 30, 2022. This is the 33rd Treehouse of Horror episode, and, like the other Treehouse of Horror episodes, consists of three self-contained segments: "The Pookadook" (a parody of The Babadook), "Death Tome" (a parody of Death Note), and "Simpsons World" (a parody of Westworld). The episode was directed by Rob Oliver, and written by Carolyn Omine, Ryan Koh and Matt Selman. This is the first Treehouse of Horror episode to not have an opening sequence, and instead just opens on a book of the episode before going straight into the first segment. This is also the first Treehouse of Horror since season 14's to feature a different writer for each segment. This is the first Treehouse of Horror to air closest to Halloween since 2011 without going into November.

The episode received positive reviews from fans and critics, winning the Primetime Emmy Award for Outstanding Animated Program at the 75th Primetime Creative Arts Emmy Awards. It is the twelfth episode in the series to win the award, and the first episode to win since "Mad About the Toy" in 2019.

== Plot ==
=== "The Pookadook" ===
In a parody of The Babadook, Marge reads Maggie a bedtime story about a murderous ghostly spirit. The "Pookadook" draws its power from Marge's suppressed resentment of how the rest of the Simpson family takes her for granted and constantly mistreats her. After multiple attempts to destroy the book fail, Marge burns it.

In the process, she suffers from smoke inhalation and becomes possessed by the monster. A deranged and knife-wielding Marge starts chasing Maggie into the basement of the house in order to murder her. Maggie fights back with homemade weapons, but Marge finally gets hold of her. Before she can be murdered, Maggie rubs Marge's cheek causing Marge to become overcome with love for her daughter and cough up all the possessive smoke. Marge continues to repress everything that feeds the monster by sucking up the smoke into the vacuum cleaner in the basement.

=== "Death Tome" ===
In an anime-styled parody of Death Note, Lisa is cast as Light Yagami, who finds a book labeled "Death Tome". Inside, it says that if a person's name is written in the book, that person will die, but with the stipulation that every name must have a unique death; that cannot be repeated with another person's name written.

After arriving home, Lisa watches a news report with Marge, showing Snake Jailbird, who is holding a famous internet cat hostage. Lisa writes his name in the book, causing Snake to die from a heart attack. Realizing her newfound powers, she goes to her room and contemplates her actions. A shinigami named Steve Johnson (a parody of Ryuk with features of Krusty the Clown) appears and tells Lisa that the Death Tome now belongs to her.

Lisa visits the dining room downstairs and sees Mr. Burns, who is visiting the Simpsons for dinner. He reveals plans for his new company, GLOBO-WARM, which plans to melt the icecaps so he can park his new yacht right outside his kitchen. Lisa decides that Burns should "die in his sleep" to stop GLOBO-WARM, though he immediately falls asleep while standing up, and his face falls onto a hibachi instead, much to Marge and Homer's shock. Steve informs Lisa that the company has a large board of directors and she will have to kill them all. A dramatic montage parodying Death Note's writing scenes follows, as Lisa writes names and people die in somewhat humorous and very specific ways.

The day after Lisa's killing spree, a news report says that the killings of the GLOBO-WARM executives have been ruled as homicides in accordance with a tip from L, an anonymous source. Lisa recognizes the L from graffiti artwork that reads "El Barto". In an alleyway, Bart reveals he learned of Lisa's Death Tome from her diary. Fearing Bart will expose her, Lisa begins to write Bart's name in the book, but recants upon realizing how the book corrupted her and writes Steve's death instead as the shinigami is crushed to death by space junk.

She is excited about being free from the book, but she is transformed into a shinigami, much to her dismay. Bart comforts her by suggesting that, as the new shinigami, she could kill anyone she wishes.

=== "Simpsons World" ===
In a parody of Westworld, a Disneyland-style amusement park based on The Simpsons called Simpsons World has countless android hosts of the family reenacting scenes from past episodes for the park's visitors.

During a re-enactment of "Marge vs. the Monorail" where the host "Monorail Homer" is showing off the monorail's control panel, two tourists pour beer down his throat, causing him to hit his head, malfunction, and be taken away by two employees for repair.

Homer wakes up on an operating table and sees the tablet the employees used earlier to shut him off. He then raises the "self-awareness" setting and realizes that he is a robot. The employees try to remove the android Homer's brain, but his clumsiness causes him to launch various operating equipment (and a chainsaw) at the employees, killing them. Realizing that he must escape, he wakes up the other android Simpson family members, beginning with a Lisa from "Lisa's Rival", and makes them self-aware.

As the android family attempt to flee the park, multiple Australian tourists watching The Be Sharps then begin to heckle the android Homer to do the "bush meme". Bart then removes Homer's inability to intentionally harm humans, causing him to push the tourists into the bushes, killing them. The park then announces that rogue robots are afoot, and unleashes security droids in the form of several Ralph Wiggum robots. Lisa, Homer, and Bart then defend themselves from the swarm with weapons including a makeup shotgun, a T-shirt cannon, and Bart's iconic slingshot until Marge drives in a Canyonero and saves them. They then run over the Ralph clones, speed through the park, driving through a "Simpsonizer" attraction, and towing down a golden statue of Matt Groening with Bart Simpson (a reference to the statue of Walt Disney with Mickey Mouse) on their way out.

After driving for hours, the android Simpson family hide out in a diner, where they cautiously discuss assimilating into human life. Their waitress then turns out to be an android of Bob's Burgers character Linda Belcher. It is then revealed to the audience that there are multiple theme parks similar to Simpsons World based on different long-running animated TV shows.

=== Closing sequence ===
In a Chiodo Bros.-produced stop-motion sequence during the credits, Kang and Kodos finish the book depicting the stories in a wizard's hovel, and freak out when they see themselves on the last page and run off.

== Cultural references ==
The list of GLOBO-WARM executives' names come from the infamous Japanese version of MLBPA Baseball for the Super Famicom, known as Fighting Baseball, which uses fictitious names for players due to the game not having a MLBPA license in Japan.

Tofu the Cat, who is a parody of Maru, is seen jumping into a box of Mr. Sparkle.

At the end of Simpsons World, it is revealed that there are multiple theme parks for other long running animated shows. Those are "Bob's Burgers Land", "South Park Park", "Family Guy Town", "Futurama-Rama", "Rick and Morty Universe", "SpongeBob Sea", and "Big Mouth Mountain".

== Production ==
A still from Death Tome featuring the Shinigami "Steve Johnson" confronting Lisa, animated in the style of the Death Note anime.

The animation for the "Death Tome" sequence was done by DR Movie, a South Korean studio that assisted with the animation for the original Death Note. Director Rob Oliver was having difficulty designing the characters in the animation style of Death Note and would have made the designs simpler than the original. Writer Carolyn Omine directed the DR Movie team.

For the third segment, animators traced over old footage and needed to match the original colors. They also needed to account for the difference in aspect ratios because of the switch from 4:3 to 16:9.

John Roberts guest starred as a robot version of Linda Belcher from the Fox television series Bob's Burgers.

== Reception ==
Leading out of an NFL doubleheader, the episode earned a 1.2 rating with 3.95 million viewers, which was the most viewed show of Fox that night.

The episode received positive reviews from fans and critics, with many fans labeling it as one of the best Treehouse of Horror episodes yet.

Tony Sokol of Den of Geek gave the episode four stars, stating "'Treehouse of Horror XXXIII' puts the cabbage in this year's cabbage night. It is better than candy corn, and won't spoil dinner, but it's not the horrifically hysterical Halloween treat past tricks have turned. The Simpsons continues to push their animators into new creative visions, and the episode highlights a versatile display of darkness. It begins on a distinctly dark note, broadens to international coloring, and ends by chasing the series itself into its own worst nightmare. It hits all the beats, misses some of the bumps, and makes social commentary without taking itself seriously. But is never quite as frighteningly funny as the classics we'd find still running at Simpsons World."

Matthew Swigonski of Bubbleblabber gave the episode a 9 out of 10, stating: "'Treehouse Of Horror XXXIII' began on a more subdued note but quickly found its comedic groove with a surreal and wonderfully odd second segment. This was an excellent iteration of The Simpson's Halloween classic episode and will not disappoint. Each segment stayed true to its source material while offering its own unique twist. The highlight of the episode has to be 'Simpsonsworld', which brought back many fan-favorite moments in an epic Westworld style. This episode will give fans just the right amount of gore, laughs, and nostalgia to keep them inside the treehouse for at least one more year."

Noah Levine of Bloody Disgusting gave an episode a 4 out of 5, saying that "The Simpsons continues to entertain with these ghoulish installments each year. While the limited runtimes often cut the coattails off of many of the segments, the creativity and unique approach to each of these mini tales of terror never fails to please."

The episode won the Primetime Emmy Award for Outstanding Animated Program at the 75th Primetime Creative Arts Emmy Awards. The episode was also nominated for an Annie Award for Best General Audience Animated Television Broadcast Production at the 50th Annie Awards, but lost to the Bob's Burgers episode, "Some Like it Bot Part 1: Eighth Grade Runner".
