= Not It =

- The Simpsons episode
- Episode no.: Season 34; Episode 5
- Directed by: Steven Dean Moore
- Written by: Cesar Mazariegos
- Production code: UABF17
- Original air date: October 23, 2022

Episode chronology
← Previous "The King of Nice"	Next → "Treehouse of Horror XXXIII"
- The Simpsons season 34

"Not It" (titled onscreen as "Treehouse of Horror Presents: Not It") is the fifth episode of the 34th season of the American animated television series The Simpsons, and the 733rd episode overall. It aired in the United States on Fox on October 23, 2022. The episode was directed by Steven Dean Moore and written by Cesar Mazariegos.

The episode is a parody of Stephen King's 1986 supernatural horror novel It and its film adaptations, It (2017) and It Chapter Two (2019). The episode received positive reviews. Maggie Simpson does not appear in this episode.

From September 29 to October 9, 2022, a contest was held that allowed viewers in the United States to submit spooky Krusty fan art. The works of 20 winners were presented during the credits of the episode.

== Plot ==
=== Not It ===
In 1990, Barney encounters Krusto, who drags him into the sewer. While looking for Barney, Homer is attacked by bullies. Seeing Krusto watching them, he calls the clown for help and escapes with the bullies following. The Losers, consisting of Marge, Comic Book Guy, Carl and Moe, defend Homer, and the bullies run away. The Losers and Homer share stories of their encounters with Krusto. They discover Krusto had several unfunny shows over many years, and he resurfaced every 27 years to kill children. As Marge and Homer show a clip from Krusto's 1963 show, Krusto emerges from the television and tries to kill Comic Book Guy. Homer stabs Krusto before Marge shuts the television off.

They go to the television studio to defeat Krusto. Homer opens a box, revealing Krusto hidden inside. The Losers ineffectively attack Krusto. When Krusto slips and hurts himself, the children laugh, which surprises Krusto as children have never laughed at him before. Krusto hurts himself for laughs until Marge gives him some cherry bombs to eat. Krusto explodes but slithers down a drain. They promise to reunite in 27 years to kill Krusto permanently. Marge kisses Comic Book Guy, who took credit for a poem that Homer wrote for her earlier.

=== Not It: Part Two ===
In 2017, Marge and Comic Book Guy are married and have two children named Bert and Lizzie (the Simpson children with reversed personalities). When bullies are killed by Krusto, Homer calls the Losers to help him defeat Krusto. Comic Book Guy refuses to help, so Marge goes by herself. As they plan how to defeat Krusto, Comic Book Guy arrives with the kids to retrieve Marge. Marge tells the kids to wait outside while she argues with Comic Book Guy. Krusto notifies the Losers that he has kidnapped Bert and Lizzie.

They return to the studio and tell Krusto they no longer have childhood fears. Krusto says adults have anxieties and shows them as he grows more powerful from the laughter of his ghost audience. He reveals that Comic Book Guy did not write the poem. Bert and Lizzie see his power comes from the sign commanding the audience to laugh. Homer gives Marge a rock to throw at the sign, and Marge realizes that Homer wrote the poem. When Krusto tries to eat Marge, Comic Book Guy jumps in the way, allowing Marge to destroy the sign. The ghosts ascend to Heaven as Krusto dies. Though Marge admits that she cannot forgive Comic Book Guy for lying to her, she is proud her dying husband was brave. Bert, Lizzie and the surviving Losers ride out of the ruins, and Homer and Marge get together.

Kang and Kodos realize their plan has failed and look through other Stephen King books to choose what to do next.

== Production ==
The Simpsons writer Cesar Mazariegos pitched an idea to do a parody of It for the annual Treehouse of Horror episode, and the producers wondered why they never did it previously. They realized that the time constraints by making it a six minute parody prevented an adaptation, so they decided to make the parody a full episode under the Treehouse of Horror brand. Before writing the episode, Mazariegos read the novel and watched the 1990 miniseries as well as the 2017 film and its 2019 sequel. He wanted to include the iconic moments such as Pennywise in the sewer. For the selection of characters to be in the Losers gang, Moe was selected because the character was flexible to fit different personalities. To complete the love triangle with Homer and Marge, he considered using Moe before choosing Comic Book Guy, whose character was "selfish and needy" and had him be the one who would die. For Pennywise, Sideshow Bob was briefly considered before settling on Krusty. His appearance was redesigned to appear more like Pennywise from the 2017 film with a thinner waist and larger head and torso.

A part was written for It author Stephen King to be a gravedigger, but he declined. King previously appeared as himself in the twelfth season episode "Insane Clown Poppy".

A contest to promote the episode was held by inviting fans to submit art depicting Krusty the Clown as Pennywise. The winners would have their art featured over the end credits to the episode.

== Cultural references ==
- Krusto the Clown (Krusty the Clown) is a parody of Pennywise.
- The hooligan Dewey Largo has a T-shirt with the name of conductor John Philip Sousa, in rock style.
- Metal Moe performs the song "Rock You Like a Hurricane" by Scorpions.
- When the adult Homer calls the Losers in his room, there is a poster of "Cypress Hill" on the walls.
- In Homer's apartment, there is a picture of a sinking boat.

== Reception ==
=== Viewing figures ===
The episode was watched by 3.63 million U.S. viewers during its initial broadcast, per Nielsen estimates.

=== Critical response ===
Tony Sokol of Den of Geek rated the episode 4 out of 5 stars stating: "The Simpsons' 'Treehouse of Horror' episodes are always season highlights, and the extra added clowning is a welcome treat (the official 'Treehouse of Horror: XXXIII' is set to premiere next week). Written by Cesar Mazariegos, and directed by Steven Dean Moore, 'Not It' is quite scary, at times, and every frame carries both thrills and spills. The clown motif provides a panorama of ways to make the audience choke on laugher [sic], even before a school bully's intestines get twisted into balloon animals. The parody works best because of the details, and some of the lines are individually hysterical. Not all, but it's not It, which gives its clown all the last laughs, even when modified for a Gen Z audience."

Matthew Swigonski of Bubbleblabber gave the episode a 7.5 out of 10 stating, "'Not It' wasn't a particularly funny episode, but it was a strong and captivating story elevated by a well-written parody script. It was also very interesting seeing the alternate lives of these familiar characters, but Homer's 'virgin loser' lifestyle was the showstopper. This was a very solid entry into the 'Treehouse Of Horror' collection with a full episode dedicated to one story. 'Not It' may have lacked a constant stream of laughs, but the audience should still feel captivated nonetheless."
