= The Old Blue Mayor She Ain't What She Used to Be =

- The Simpsons episode
- Episode no.: Season 29; Episode 6
- Directed by: Matthew Nastuk
- Written by: Tom Gammill; Max Pross
- Production code: WABF20
- Original air date: November 12, 2017

Guest appearance
- Carolyn Omine as Focus Group Woman

Episode features
- Chalkboard gag: "I will not ask my guidance counselor why he couldn't get a better job"
- Couch gag: A silent film. The Simpson children and others are sent to work in a coal mine. The elevator descends too far and ends up in Hell. Bart decides to stay and swing dances with devils.

Episode chronology
← Previous "Grampy Can Ya Hear Me"	Next → "Singin' in the Lane"
- The Simpsons season 29

"The Old Blue Mayor She Ain't What She Used to Be" is the sixth episode of the twenty-ninth season of the American animated television series The Simpsons, and the 624th episode of the series overall. The episode was directed by Matthew Nastuk and written by Tom Gammill and Max Pross. It aired in the United States on Fox on November 12, 2017. The title is a take-off on the folk song The Old Gray Mare.

In this episode, Marge becomes the mayor of the town, but struggles to maintain popularity until she is caught berating Homer. The episode received positive reviews.

== Plot ==
The track of the old Springfield Monorail (from "Marge vs. the Monorail") is converted into a "sky park". At the official opening, Mayor Quimby turns on the electricity which causes the monorail car to activate and destroy the boardwalk, running down Sebastian Cobb in the process before finally derailing and crashing into a memorial statue of Leonard Nimoy.

At a town hall meeting about the disaster, Mayor Quimby shrugs off Marge's suggestions with sexist remarks after which she is encouraged by her family to run against him for Mayor of Springfield. After an initial slump in the opinion polls, a promise at the candidates' debate to extinguish the tire fire pushes her support above Quimby's, ultimately winning her the election.

However, when the bulldozers arrive at the tire fire, Marge feels sympathy for the landmark's souvenir stand operator who has chained himself to the gates in protest, and calls them off where she is accused of breaking her promise. When Marge and her support team return to the tire fire offering to buy the souvenir stand. When he declines her offer, she accidentally insults the still-chained owner learning that he was a Vietnam War veteran whose best friend died stepping on a land mine. This further damages her support.

In an attempt to win back voters, Marge holds a live broadcast from the Simpson kitchen which is watched and rated live by her support team (consisting of Lindsay Neagle, Professor Frink, and Julio) and a focus group. During this, she chastises Homer's embarrassing antics, filling the room with laughter and causing her approval rating to skyrocket. As a result, she is encouraged to continue to publicly make fun of Homer, who gets a sandwich named after him, and his own balloon in the Thanksgiving Day Parade that "farts" confetti.

When she sees how Homer has been turned into a laughingstock, she visits Quimby at his home to ask if it is possible to balance being a good leader and having a family life. He tells her that it is not, but that the first night out of office, he truly noticed how attracted he is to his wife Martha. She thanks Marge as well for "giving her husband back".

At the christening of a manhole cover, Marge breaks from the script her corrupt political strategist Lindsey gives her and professes her love for Homer. The crowd walks away muttering in disappointment.

Eight years later in the final scene, Marge and Homer walk through a hall dedicated to her political career. Marge suggests skipping one exhibit that they come near, but Homer points out they have to pass through it to get to the building's cafeteria. They then walk through the exhibit that revealed that she was impeached and Quimby was reinstated as the Mayor of Springfield.

== Reception ==
Dennis Perkins of The A.V. Club gave the episode a B, stating "'The Old Blue Mayor She Ain't What She Used to Be' largely commits to examining how Marge’s rise to power as Springfield’s new mayor relies upon how the knee-jerk, irresponsibly swayed townspeople are susceptible to manipulation based on their basest, most selfish instincts. The Simpsons isn’t a cynical show so much as it resists the temptation to either demonize or lionize civic-mindedness or patriotism. The people of Springfield, tonight, flock to Marge not because she’s clearly a better candidate and person than perennially elected, womanizing, cartoonishly corrupt Diamond Joe Quimby, but because resident political operative Lindsey Naegle convinces her to use Professor Frink’s micro-targeted campaigning."

Tony Sokol of Den of Geek gave the episode 3.5 out of 5 stars. He liked the jokes and sight gags and highlighted the song explaining what voters look for in a candidate.

"The Old Blue Mayor She Ain't What She Used to Be" scored a 1.9 rating with a 7 share and was watched by 4.75 million people, making it Fox's highest rated show of the night.
