= From Beer to Paternity =

- The Simpsons episode
- Episode no.: Season 34; Episode 7
- Directed by: Rob Oliver
- Written by: Christine Nangle
- Production code: OABF01
- Original air date: November 13, 2022

Guest appearances
- Paul Brittain as Brandon; Aubrey Plaza as Amber Duffman

Episode features
- Couch gag: The Simpsons, in live action, are made from food and covered in gravy.

Episode chronology
| ← Previous "Treehouse of Horror XXXIII" | Next → "Step Brother from the Same Planet" |
- The Simpsons season 34

"From Beer to Paternity" is the seventh episode of the thirty-fourth season of The Simpsons, and the 735th episode overall. It aired in the United States on Fox on November 13, 2022. The episode was directed by Rob Oliver and written by Christine Nangle. In this episode, Duffman must prove he is not sexist after Duff threatens to replace him as the mascot of the company. In the process, Duffman reunited with his daughter after a long absence.

The episode features guest stars Paul Brittain and Aubrey Plaza as Amber Duffman. The episode was dedicated in memory of Julie Kavner's partner David Davis.

== Plot ==
Duff Beer holds a new mascot contest, so Duffman fights to remain relevant and prove that he isn't sexist by using a photo of Lisa with him from an old promotional event and claiming she's his daughter. When Homer and Lisa confront Duffman, he reveals he really does have an estranged daughter named Amber. As Duffman notices how smart Lisa has become, he views Homer as the ultimate father and enlists his help to reconnect with Amber and win the competition. He calls Amber to meet, and she agrees.

Duffman asks Homer and Lisa to come for support because he looks up to their father-daughter relationship. Homer agrees, but Lisa only agrees when he promises to bring her to a nearby Agatha Christie museum. On the way, they sing along to Korean pop music. Duffman reveals how Amber left him after high school, and he keeps a drawing she made when she was a girl as a memento. Duffman's agent says there is a fan convention close by, and he should go for publicity. Because of the detour, they do not arrive at the museum before it closes, which angers Lisa. Duffman realizes that Homer was bribing Lisa, so he leaves on his own.

Going home, Homer and Lisa find Amber's drawing in the car and decide to return it to him. Duffman goes to Amber's door but is too nervous, so he joins a nearby party. When Homer and Lisa arrive, they learn that Duffman did not come, but the three find him at the party. Amber leaves in anger, but Duffman rescues her when she is almost hit by a beer barrel. Duffman shows her the drawing, and they forgive each other.

Duffman wins the contest after fans on the internet saw a video of Duffman singing that Lisa uploaded earlier. He rejects the outcome to become the mascot of Amber's cannabis shop.

== Production ==
On March 8, 2022, it was revealed by Carolyn Omine that "From Beer to Paternity" would be the first production episode of Season 34, which Al Jean confirmed the same day.

Aubrey Plaza guest starred as Duffman's daughter, Amber. Paul Brittain guest starred as Brandon.

== Cultural references ==
Homer, Lisa, and Duffman sing "Lovesick Girls" by Blackpink. Jisoo of Blackpink acknowledged the song's appearance on her Instagram account.

- The title is a parody of the 1953 film "From Here to Eternity"
- "Oh Yeah" by Yello plays in the episode

== Reception ==
=== Viewing figures ===
The episode earned a 0.97 rating with 4.77 million viewers, which was the most-watched show on Fox that night.

=== Critical response ===
"From Beer to Paternity" received positive reviews from television critics.

Review website The Review Geek gave the episode a 3 out of 5 stars, calling the episode captivating and mildly funny, enjoying Duffman's character arc but wished there were more jokes.

Tony Sokol of Den of Geek gave the episode 3 out of 5 stars. He said it is an "effective character expanding episode" for Duffman with "a lot of individually hysterical lines," but that it suffers for not including Bart.

Matthew Swigonski of Bubbleblabber gave the episode a 7.5 out of 10. He highlighted the new development of Homer and Lisa's relationship. He felt the last act was rushed, and the main story could have been expanded. However, the overall episode was satisfactory.

Cathal Gunning of Screen Rant thought the episode was not interesting because it marginalized the Simpson family and wasted guest star Aubrey Plaza. Gunning also pointed out that there have been several distinct Duffman characters on the show.

Mike Hale of The New York Times called the episode "unexpectedly moving."
