= Murder, She Boat =

- The Simpsons episode
- Episode no.: Season 35; Episode 9
- Directed by: Chris Clements
- Written by: Broti Gupta
- Production code: 35ABF04
- Original air date: December 17, 2023

Guest appearances
- Maurice LaMarche as Hedonismbot cosplayer; Taika Waititi as himself

Episode chronology
← Previous "Ae Bonny Romance"	Next → "Do the Wrong Thing"
- The Simpsons season 35

"Murder, She Boat" is the ninth episode of the thirty-fifth season of the American animated television series The Simpsons, and the 759th episode overall. It aired in the United States on Fox on December 17, 2023. The episode was directed by Chris Clements and written by Broti Gupta.

In this episode, a crime is blamed on Bart while the Simpson family is on a cruise, so Lisa investigates when he claims to be innocent. Maurice LaMarche guest starred and filmmaker Taika Waititi appeared as himself. The episode received mixed reviews.

== Plot ==
Marge finds two pandemic stimulus checks that were stuck in the mailbox. Lisa proposes spending the money on a cruise. The family learns that it is a pop culture cruise which counts filmmaker Taika Waititi among the passengers. Comic Book Guy arrives to present his rare Radioactive Man toy figure with Wolverine claws. Bart is angry with him because he recently laughed at his hand-drawn comic book. At dinner, where people are looking at the figure, the lights go off. When the lighting is restored, the figure's head has been cut off. Seeing Bart with three scratches on his face, the passengers blame Bart, and he is placed in the jail on the ship.

Bart tells Lisa that he is innocent, and she decides to investigate. Waititi chooses to help her. They interview the passengers and find that many people on board have a motive. In her room, Lisa discovers the figure's head under Bart's bed, which causes Lisa to think Bart is guilty. At the door, Rainier Wolfcastle tells Lisa that he knows who culprit is, but is knocked unconscious by a Captain America shield. Lisa runs after the attacker but only finds Waititi eating food left by passengers in the corridor. They learn that Comic Book Guy has gone missing.

Waititi declares he has solved the mystery. He says that Comic Boy Guy had insured the figure and escaped with the money. However, Lisa notices the British spelling of words on the figure's box and presents another theory. She thinks another person broke their own figure and went on the cruise to swap figures. She accuses Waititi of the crime. The passengers search Waititi's room and find the original figure. Waititi is arrested, and Comic Book Guy is found in the ship's gym. He had secretly recorded Lisa and Waititi's interviews of the passengers and was hiding because he was ashamed after learning what people thought of him. Bart thanks Lisa for believing him, and she declines to mention that she had lost faith.

After watching his wife Kumiko's sadness during her interview, Comic Book Guy dumps the figure into the water to put his marriage first, much to Kumiko's joy.

== Production ==
Filmmaker Taika Waititi appeared as himself. Maurice LaMarche appeared as a cosplayer dressed as Hedonismbot, a character from the television series Futurama, created by Matt Groening, that is voiced by LaMarche.

== Release ==
The episode aired simultaneously in all time zones in the United States at 8:30 PM ET/5:30 PM PT following a special episode of Krapopolis.

== Reception ==
=== Viewing figures ===
The episode earned a 0.53 rating with 2.08 million viewers, which was the second most-watched show on Fox that night.

=== Critical response ===
John Schwarz of Bubbleblabber gave the episode a 9 out of 10. He praised the dialog written by Broti Gupta and the performance by Taika Waititi. However, he thought the solution to the mystery was plain to see.

Cathal Gunning of Screen Rant thought the episode was overly focused on the appearance by Waititi while putting aside the Simpson family. He also felt the episode reinforced the perception that Waititi is "self-indulgent."
