= The King of Nice =

- The Simpsons episode
- Episode no.: Season 34; Episode 4
- Directed by: Debbie Bruce Mahan
- Written by: Jessica Conrad
- Production code: UABF20
- Original air date: October 16, 2022

Guest appearance
- Drew Barrymore as herself

Episode chronology
← Previous "Lisa the Boy Scout"	Next → "Not It"
- The Simpsons season 34

"The King of Nice" is the fourth episode of the thirty-fourth season of the American animated television series The Simpsons, and the 732nd episode overall. It aired in the United States on Fox on October 16, 2022. The episode was directed by Debbie Bruce Mahan and written by Jessica Conrad.

In this episode, Marge becomes a producer on Krusty's new talk show which consumes her life. Actress Drew Barrymore guest starred as herself. The episode received mixed reviews.

== Plot ==
Krusty, broke from "non-funny TV shows" (NFT) losses, is the children's entertainment at Kelly Clarkson's housewarming party in a gated community. Because the children are not paying attention, he explores her fancy house and learns the money for the house comes from her daytime talk show. Lindsey Naegle asks if Krusty is interested in hosting his own talk show, and he accepts. At a pet store, Marge is selected for a focus group for Krusty's talk show. After Marge makes some good suggestions, Lindsey hires Marge as a segment producer.

Krusty's show begins airing, and Marge's ideas are shown to be popular with audiences. Her work on the show soon consumes her life, and she has little time for her family. Marge's ideas become less popular over time. Lindsey begins rejecting all her ideas, leading to a stressful work environment.

The family tries to intervene when they see Marge under stress, but she dismisses them as being jealous of her success. An exposé is shown on television that depicts the terrible working environment on the show, and Marge realizes how much she has changed. Krusty is forced to apologize, but Marge interrupts and says it is not his fault. Instead, Krusty takes responsibility and ends the show to become a judge on a court show.

Marge gets a call from Drew Barrymore to become a segment producer on The Drew Barrymore Show, but she declines for now.

== Production ==
Actress Drew Barrymore was cast as herself. She called the recording experience a "dream realized." Barrymore previously guest starred as Sophie Krustofsky in the twelfth season episode "Insane Clown Poppy." She had since been replaced in that role by Natasha Lyonne.

Marge Simpson, as voiced by Julie Kavner, appeared in a segment on The Drew Barrymore Show two days before the episode aired. Executive producer Matt Selman stated that producers wanted Marge to appear on the show to promote the episode.

== Cultural references ==
Krusty's talk show is a parody of the talk show The Ellen DeGeneres Show, and the gated community is for people who made money on the singing competition television series American Idol.

== Reception ==
=== Viewing figures ===
The episode scored a 0.3 demo rating and was watched by 1.16 million viewers, which was the most-watched show on Fox that night. This was down significantly the previous week's audience of 3.43 million, when Fox had the NFL doubleheader as the lead-in, and down from the 4.15 million viewers that watched the premiere.

=== Critical reception ===
Tony Sokol of Den of Geek gave the episode a 3.5 out of 5 with the comments on The Ellen DeGeneres Show being dated but also up to date with the use of memes. He praised Marge's story arc, but felt the criticism of the workplace culture of talk shows could have been stronger. He found Krusty's apology to be a high point since he was truly not responsible for the situation. He also praised the visual gags, which make the episode rewatchable.

Matthew Swigonski of Bubbleblabber gave the episode a 3.0 out of 10, largely criticizing the lack of impact in the episode's plot and the overly fast pacing. He felt it was a retread of previous episodes, suggesting that the narrative of The Simpsons may be close to the end.

Kevin E G Perry of The Independent called the episode "a sharp, well-executed satire that also gives the show a chance to poke fun at itself." He highlighted the self-referential joke of how Bart can watch hundreds of old episodes featuring Krusty on his tablet whenever he wants.

Mike Hale of The New York Times called the episode "perfectly pitched satire."
