= The Many Saints of Springfield =

- The Simpsons episode
- Episode no.: Season 34; Episode 13
- Directed by: Bob Anderson
- Written by: Al Jean
- Production code: OABF06
- Original air date: February 19, 2023

Guest appearances
- Paul Fusco as ALF; Kipp Lennon as Italian American Singer; Joe Mantegna as Fat Tony

Episode features
- Couch gag: Homer falls into the couch and becomes stop-motion, discovering lost items that have resided inside the couch over the years and begins getting chased by the sentient items. Homer manages to escape the couch, retaining his stop-motion design.

Episode chronology
← Previous "My Life as a Vlog"	Next → "Carl Carlson Rides Again"
- The Simpsons season 34

"The Many Saints of Springfield" is the thirteenth episode of the thirty-fourth season of the American animated television series The Simpsons, and the 741st episode overall. It aired in the United States on Fox on February 19, 2023. The episode was directed by Bob Anderson and written by series showrunner Al Jean.

In this episode, Ned Flanders goes to work for Fat Tony, but his life turns perilous after he learns what Fat Tony does. Paul Fusco guest starred. The episode received mixed reviews.

The episode was dedicated in memory of David Crosby, who appeared in "Marge in Chains" and "Homer's Barbershop Quartet". The episode's title is a reference to the 2021 film The Many Saints of Newark. The series title does not appear in the episode. The episode opens with a couch gag, followed by a cloud sequence with the text "The Many Saints of Springfield" instead of "The Simpsons".

== Plot ==
Ned Flanders' garbage can explodes and Marge sees Ned putting out the fire. After several more near-death experiences, Marge forces Ned to explain the situation to him. When he was a teacher at Springfield Elementary School, he was reprimanded by Superintendent Chalmers for telling Nelson to pray. When Ned then prayed for Chalmers, he was fired. With his church temporarily closed, Ned went to a Catholic church to pray and met Fat Tony, who decides to fund the Leftorium for Ned.

Ned and Fat Tony became friends. When Lisa saw Ned and Fat Tony together, she tried to explain that Fat Tony was a head of the mafia, but Ned refused to believe it. He told her that Homer was more of a criminal than Fat Tony. Later, when Ned confronted Fat Tony, he admitted it and threatened Ned’s life.

In the present, Ned's house and church are destroyed, so he stays in the Simpsons' attic over the garage. The mafia find out where Ned is hiding, but Ned has gone to confront Fat Tony again. When the mafia arrive, Ned reveals that he has been working with the FBI ever since Lisa warned him, and they arrest Fat Tony and the mafia.

== Production ==
The episode was revealed to be in production on May 12, 2022. With current long-running showrunner Al Jean posting a picture of the script for the episode, along with revealing it to be Episode 740 and Bob Anderson as the director for the episode.

Previously, Flanders became Bart's teacher in the twenty-ninth season episode "Left Behind". Writer and executive producer Al Jean wanted to explain why Flanders was no longer Bart's teacher and included the reason as part of this episode.

The live-action couch gag was produced by Stoopid Buddy Stoodios, which produces the television series Robot Chicken. It features Paul Fusco reprising his role as ALF.

The episode was dedicated in memory of musician David Crosby. Crosby appeared as himself in the fourth season episode "Marge in Chains" and the fifth season episode "Homer's Barbershop Quartet".

== Cultural references ==
There were several references to the television series The Sopranos and the episode's title is a reference to its 2021 prequel film The Many Saints of Newark. The character ALF appears during the couch gag. "Requiem" by Mozart and "It's Bad You Know" by R. L. Burnside is played during the episode.

== Reception ==
=== Viewing figures ===
The episode earned a 0.35 rating and was watched by 1.37 million viewers, which was the most watched show on Fox that night.

=== Critical response ===
“The Many Saints of Springfield” received mixed reviews from critics.

John Schwarz of Bubbleblabber gave the episode a 6 out of 10. He felt the episode was lazy and that there were better Fat Tony episodes in the past. He noted that the couch gag was one of the best made from an outside studio.

Tony Sokol of Den of Geek gave the episode a 4 out of 5 stars. He highlights the relationship between Ned and Fat Tony and how a religious organization can be closely tied to the mafia. He also made note of the small jokes that are barely noticeable.
