= One Angry Lisa =

- The Simpsons episode
- Episode no.: Season 34; Episode 2
- Directed by: Matthew Nastuk
- Written by: Jessica Conrad
- Production code: UABF19
- Original air date: October 2, 2022

Guest appearances
- Jane Kaczmarek as Judge Constance Harm; Joe Mantegna as Fat Tony

Episode features
- Couch gag: The Simpson family is sitting on the couch with Homer drinking, when suddenly the rug becomes a vortex that eats them. The family together with other objects start spinning around in the tornado, with Homer's eyes becoming all dizzy, till the tornado slows down, and start running on it, then using smaller rugs as skateboards. The rug then start spinning them out of Homer's mouth. When they return to the couch, Homer sips on the drink, the rug flips and then Homer burps. Animated by Bill Plympton.

Episode chronology
← Previous "Habeas Tortoise"	Next → "Lisa the Boy Scout"
- The Simpsons season 34

"One Angry Lisa" is the second episode of the thirty-fourth season of the American animated television series The Simpsons, and the 730th episode overall. It aired in the United States on Fox on October 2, 2022. The episode was directed by Matthew Nastuk and written by Jessica Conrad.

In this episode, Marge bonds with her stationary bike instructor, making Homer jealous, while Lisa performs jury duty due to the incompetence of the legal system. Jane Kaczmarek guest-starred as Judge Constance Harm. The episode received positive reviews.

== Plot ==
When Marge sees a commercial for an exercise bike on television, she convinces Homer to buy it for her. Although Homer tries to assemble it, Marge does it herself and selects Jesse as her video instructor. While exercising one day, she calls out Jesse's name instead of Homer's, causing Homer to become concerned she will leave him for Jesse, especially after she pays extra for a private ride with Jesse. Homer finds out where Jesse lives and goes to confront him. He finds Jesse with multiple simultaneous private rides, and they fight in front of the bikers. Marge uses Lisa's bike to go to Jesse's house, where she sees the multiple private rides and beats up Jesse. Homer and Marge make up and leave, singing a duet of "Just the Two of Us" while biking across town.

Meanwhile, Lisa receives a jury duty summons and decides to attend because she fears she will go to prison if she ignores it. In the jury room, she tries to be excused from the jury for being underage, but she is denied, causing her to complain about the incompetence of the witnesses and attorneys. Her outbursts cause the judge to declare a mistrial, which further angers Lisa.

== Production ==
The couch gag was created by animator Bill Plympton. He has created several couch gags for the series since the twenty-third season.

== Cultural references ==
- The title and subplot of the series is a reference to the movie "Twelve Angry Men".
- At the end of the first act, Homer makes a mistake and immediately apologizes to the audience, thereby breaking the "fourth wall."
- During the trial, the judge plays the Wordle puzzle.
- In a scene where Marge is riding the exercise bike, one of the virtual backgrounds shows Futurama characters Philip J. Fry and Leela in outer space.

== Controversy ==
Due to criticism of China, this episode is not available on the Disney+ service in Hong Kong. The episode contains a line: "Behold the wonders of China. Bitcoin mines, forced labor camps where children make smartphones." This is not the first episode unavailable in Hong Kong. After the launch of Disney+ in 2021, "Goo Goo Gai Pan" was unavailable in this region. It was removed due to references to the 1989 Tiananmen Square massacre.

== Reception ==
=== Viewing figures ===
The episode was watched by 1.46 million viewers, scoring a 0.5 demo rating and making it the most-watched show on Fox that night.

=== Critical response ===
Tony Sokol of Den of Geek rated the episode 3.5 out of 5 stars, stating "'One Angry Lisa' tips the scales to a calorie-burning laugh quotient, but coasts through the legal system. Marge is insidiously undermined by the comforts of easy stereotypes, which is a subversive counterpunch worthy of The Simpsons' ambiguous commentary. Written by Jessica Conrad and directed by Matthew Nastuk, the episode appears to have a happy ending, but it's not as healthy as a bicycle built for two. At least it doesn't end with Homer getting on a bike for a little much-needed cardio."

Marcus Gibson of Bubbleblabber gave the episode a 7 out of 10 stating, "'One Angry Lisa' seemed more interested in Marge getting fit than Lisa getting sent to jury duty. This is due to Lisa's subplot not having a narrative worthy enough of showcasing an issue on how the system chooses people for jury duty. However, it benefits with its share of decent gags, including Homer's failed attempt to build the exercise bike and breaking his back from carrying the package to the house. While Marge being addicted to something isn't anything we haven't seen before in the show's 34-year run, the episode shows that getting fit on a stationary bike is more fun than attending a trial as a jury."
