= Lisa the Boy Scout =

- The Simpsons episode
- Episode no.: Season 34; Episode 3
- Directed by: Timothy Bailey
- Written by: Dan Greaney
- Production code: UABF21
- Original air date: October 9, 2022

Guest appearances
- Anna Faris as Ashley the Female Hacker; Matt Friend as Baby Jeff Goldblum; Megan Mullally as Sarah Wiggum

Episode features
- Couch gag: The couch is replaced by a Scrabble rack with eight tiles that are rearranged, eventually forming the words "COUCH GAG."

Episode chronology
← Previous "One Angry Lisa"	Next → "The King of Nice"
- The Simpsons season 34

"Lisa the Boy Scout" is the third episode of the thirty-fourth season of the American animated television series The Simpsons, and the 731st episode overall. It aired in the United States on Fox on October 9, 2022. The episode was directed by Timothy Bailey and written by Dan Greaney.

A self-referential anthology, the episode portrays two anonymous masked hackers, who hijack a Boy Scouts-related episode currently being broadcast and break the fourth wall by leaking the show's unreleased "storylines". Anna Faris, Matt Friend, and Megan Mullally guest starred. The episode received positive reviews. Animator Nik Ranieri won a Primetime Emmy Award for Outstanding Individual Achievement in Animation for his work in this episode.

== Plot ==
The episode begins with Bart preparing for the annual Boy Explorers jamboree, only to be angered and jealous to learn that Lisa has also joined the Boy Explorers and has already received three badges. Suddenly, two anonymous masked and voice-modulated hackers hijack the broadcast and proceed to play clips that paint the show in a bad or shocking light. Among such scenes include Lenny being a figment of Carl's imagination, a middle-aged Bart traveling back to the first episode and telling the family about future events in order to astound the world with their predictions, Martin actually being an adult married man named Reggie with a family, working as an undercover cop at Springfield Elementary, and Homer waking up from a coma after his fall down Springfield Gorge. Among the "unreleased" clips mixed in are actual nonsensical clips from derided episodes such as "Saddlesore Galactica" and "The Fat and the Furriest".

During breaks in the montages, the two hackers' voice modulators stop working, and the two become attracted to one another, particularly the male hacker's British accent, and start making out, resulting in their masks falling off, revealing their faces on-air.

Law enforcement officials eventually find the hackers' hideout, but are let free when the two threaten to leak shocking clips from other parts of The Walt Disney Company, including Pixar, Marvel, Star Wars, and National Geographic as well as deleting all Marvel movies from Disney+ except for the Edward Norton version of The Incredible Hulk.

The scene then shifts back to the end of the Boy Explorers episode, where Bart and Lisa, having somehow gotten lost in the woods during the broadcast interruption, manage to make their way out safe but scared by the experience, and Homer and Marge reveal that they almost got divorced over a small and insignificant matter but were able to get over it quickly.

During the credits, the hackers have escaped from the law enforcement on their motorcycle. Stopping along the road to formally introduce each other, they both learn that they share the same first name of Ashley and the hackers make out in front of the sunset.

== Production ==
The episode was originally named "Love, Hacktually." In an interview with the podcast Good One: A Podcast About Jokes, it was revealed this episode was pitched as an updated version of "22 Short Films About Springfield," and the writers were prompted to pitch as many "unusable" ideas as possible. The depiction of the hackers falling in love came from a push from executive producer James L. Brooks to make the story emotional.

Advance promotion for the episode only referenced the Boy Explorers storyline, but noted Anna Faris' guest role as a female hacker. Executive producer Matt Selman also live-tweeted during the episode as if the episode was actually hacked.

The "Hoping for a Dream" song by Matthew Sweet heard during the montage of rejected episode titles was originally heard in the episode "Covercraft."

== Cultural references ==
The title and the Boy Explorers group in the storyline are references to the Boy Scouts of America, whose main program Scouts BSA began admitting girls in 2019. "Pseudo-nonymous" is a parody of the Anonymous hacker and activist collective. Showrunner Matt Selman, after being questioned about the similarities between Ashley the female hacker and the avatar used by the YouTuber The Simpsons Theory, stated that "I feel like this is an example of magical cosmic osmosis but who knows?" The sketch of Homer's apology to Finland was based on John Cena's apology video to China.

== Reception ==
=== Viewing figures ===
Buoyed in part by a Fox NFL doubleheader game as its lead-in in much of the country, the episode was watched by 3.43 million U.S. viewers during its initial broadcast, per Nielsen estimates. This was up significantly from the previous week's audience of 1.46 million, when rival network CBS had the NFL doubleheader, but down from the 4.15 million viewers that watched the premiere.

=== Critical response ===
The episode received mostly positive reviews from critics. Tony Sokol of Den of Geek rated the episode 5 out of 5 stars, calling it a "classic episode" and adding that the episode "puts its subversion upfront, pulling the rug out and allowing viewers the chance to see the old series as a new viewing experience. It then throws in relentless jokes, concludes every clip, and holds nothing sacred, especially itself."

Conversely, Marcus Gibson of Bubbleblabber gave the episode a 2 out of 10, deeming the premise a "tiring fourth-wall-breaking joke that wore out its welcome after the first few minutes," and concluding that "the overall experience was one of the most disappointing things to happen to The Simpsons."

Mike Hale of The New York Times named this episode one of the best episodes of television of the year 2022, calling it "a lovingly assembled panoply of blackout sketches."

Jesse David Fox of Vulture called the episode "one of the wildest, all-out funniest episodes in the history of the show."

=== Awards and nominations ===
Nik Ranieri won a Primetime Emmy Award for Outstanding Individual Achievement in Animation for Character Layout at the 75th Primetime Creative Arts Emmy Awards for his work on this episode.
