= My Life as a Vlog =

- The Simpsons episode
- Episode no.: Season 34; Episode 12
- Directed by: Debbie Bruce Mahan
- Written by: Jessica Conrad
- Production code: OABF05
- Original air date: January 1, 2023

Guest appearances
- Bob the Drag Queen as himself; Michael Rapaport as Mike Wegman; Monét X Change as herself

Episode chronology
← Previous "Top Goon"	Next → "The Many Saints of Springfield"
- The Simpsons season 34

"My Life as a Vlog" is the twelfth episode of the thirty-fourth season of the American animated television series The Simpsons, and the 740th episode overall. It aired in the United States on Fox on January 1, 2023. The episode was directed by Debbie Bruce Mahan and written by Jessica Conrad.

In this episode, the rise and fall of the Simpson family's vlog is told through a series of recommended YouTube videos. When the controversial Simpsons' social media presence is revealed, stringing a rabbit hole of conspiracy theories in Springfield with it. The episode received positive reviews.

The episode was dedicated in memory of former music editor Chris Ledesma, who died on December 16, 2022.

== Plot ==
A YouTube user watches a video of the Simpson family showing off their new mansion. The user switches over to another video showing how they rose to fame when a video of Homer and Maggie went viral. The rest of the family becomes famous when another video shows the family singing while Bart is on laughing gas. Another video shows how each family member has their own channel, featuring Marge interviews with people eating fried foods, Bart has a prank show, and Lisa shows herself cleaning beaches.

However, the user then finds a video, made by Milhouse, exposing the dark side of the Simpsons. The video shows Homer angrily lashing out at people, Lisa dirtying beaches to clean them up, and Homer scaring Maggie for a sponsorship. Next, a video by Lenny and Carl shows that Maggie now refuses to film with Homer, so a fake Maggie is created. The user watches a video of the Simpsons announcing they will be making a statement because of the poor publicity, but no more videos exist.

The user watches a series of videos of people theorizing about what may have happened to the Simpsons. The video makers find out where the Simpsons live, and they learn that the family accidentally locked themselves in the mansion's panic room. During that time, they reconnected with one another and decided to stop making videos.

The user is revealed to be George R. R. Martin, whose wife gets on his case to stop procrastinating and finish The Winds of Winter. He then starts to watch another video of drag queens getting into a heated argument in a Waffle House.

== Production ==
Michael Price confirmed the episode on April 28, 2022, also confirming Jessica Conrad as the writer for the episode.

The original idea for the episode was to show a series of YouTube videos with a mystery similar to the 2018 film Searching. Writer Jessica Conrad and producer Carolyn Omine turned the idea into a story about the Simpson family achieving internet fame and the resultant drawbacks. Executive producer Matt Selman stated that there was difficulty in choosing what type of YouTube channel each Springfield resident would have.

Drag queens Bob the Drag Queen and Monét X Change appeared as themselves. They sent the producers photos to show how they would dress in a Waffle House.

The episode was dedicated in memory of former music editor Chris Ledesma, who worked on The Tracey Ullman Show and 734 episodes of The Simpsons from the first episode until May 2022.

== Cultural references ==
- George R. R. Martin's procrastination reflects the long writing history of The Winds of Winter.
- The title is a reference to the 1985 Swedish film My Life as a Dog.
- Mike Wegman's video is a parody of the video Leave Britney Alone.
- The panic room that the Simpsons family owns is sponsored by Mountain Dew.

== Reception ==
=== Viewing figures ===
The episode scored 0.3 rating with 1.02 million viewers, which was the most watched show on Fox that night.

=== Critical response ===
The episode received generally positive reviews from television critics.

Tony Sokol of Den of Geek gave the episode a 4 out of 5 stars. He praised the format change to provide commentary on the video clip format. He highlighted the video of Patty and Selma's ASMR recording. He also highlighted the jokes showing the dangers of product placement.

Matthew Swigonski of Bubbleblabber gave the episode an 8.0 out of 10. He complemented the episode's ability to randomly jump between video clips without losing the narrative. Although he praised many of the clips, he thought the yogurt clips were not funny. He also thought the ending did not fit with the rest of the episode but enjoyed the tag scene.

Cathal Gunning of Screen Rant liked that the episode was a parody of the history of the show where the family uses their initial acclaim to generate money. He felt the ending was weaker than the rest of the episode.
