= Forgive and Regret =

- The Simpsons episode
- Episode no.: Season 29; Episode 18
- Directed by: Rob Oliver
- Written by: Bill Odenkirk
- Production code: XABF09
- Original air date: April 29, 2018

Guest appearance
- Glenn Close as Mona Simpson

Episode chronology
← Previous "Lisa Gets the Blues"	Next → "Left Behind"
- The Simpsons season 29

"Forgive and Regret" is the eighteenth episode of the twenty-ninth season of the American animated television series The Simpsons, and the 636th episode of the series overall. The episode was directed by Rob Oliver and written by Bill Odenkirk. It aired in the United States on Fox on April 29, 2018.

The title is a play on "forgive and forget". The episode deals with the relationship between Homer and Grampa Simpson hitting rock bottom once again, the result of a secret that the latter held from his son. The episode received positive reviews.

As of this episode, The Simpsons surpassed Gunsmoke to become the longest-running scripted American primetime television series by number of episodes. This event was marked in the opening sequence by a gunfight between Maggie and Marshal Matt Dillon.

== Plot ==
While leaving Moe's Tavern, Homer knocks over a streetlight. A man appears, who gives Homer $500 for his car to use it in a demolition derby. While at the derby, Grampa has a heart attack, and Homer escorts his father to the hospital. Dr. Hibbert says Grampa is about to die, so Grampa whispers a confession to Homer, who promises not to reveal it. He also forgives him because he wants to have peace between them before he dies. However, Grampa ends up surviving, which angers Homer.

Grampa mocks Homer because Homer promised to keep his secret. The family sends Grampa and Homer to solve an escape room at the mall to force them to bond, but it fails. Homer tells his family about how he and his mother, Mona, bonded over baking pies. She wrote down the pie recipes and placed them in a box to remind him of her. He announces Grampa's secret, that after she left home, Grampa threw anything that reminded him of her off a cliff, including the recipe box. Grampa had lied to Homer, saying Mona took the recipes with her. The family turns against Grampa.

The family learns that Grampa is going to the cliff to find the box. Homer tries to stop him, but they end up tied to a rope hanging on the side of the cliff. Homer sees the recipe box on a ledge and tries reaching for it. Grampa cuts his rope, so Homer can reach the ledge and lands on Mona's bed at the bottom of the cliff. However, the box is empty. Later, at a nearby restaurant, the family is eating pie, which taste exactly like Mona's pie. The waitress tells Homer that she found the recipes falling down the cliff when Grampa tossed them out, and she gives them to Homer. Homer and Grampa reconcile once again.

Later, Homer buys back his old car, finding that Snowball II has been in the car the whole time.

== Production ==
In honor of The Simpsons becoming the longest-running scripted American primetime television series with its 636th episode beating the record held by Gunsmoke, the episode features a pre-title sequence of Maggie shooting Marshal Matt Dillon. Creator Matt Groening said that the cliff scene is a nod to Homer's fall into Springfield Gorge from the second season episode "Bart the Daredevil."

Originally, the previous episode was scheduled to be the record-breaking episode before the scheduling pattern changed. That episode also alluded to the record when Bart reminds Homer about the radio episodes of Gunsmoke.

The apple pie recipe in the episode was created by Evan Kleiman, who hosts "Good Food" on KCRW in Los Angeles. Kleimen knew producer Richard Sakai previously, but the idea for adding a real recipe in the episode came from executive producer James L. Brooks, who contacted KCRW about asking Kleiman because he was a fan of "Good Food." Kleiman selected an apple pie recipe with which she had been working since she was a teenager.

== Cultural references ==
Grampa watches NCIS, another long-running scripted American primetime television series. Homer sings a parody of the song, "The Way We Were."

== Reception ==
=== Viewing figures ===
"Forgive and Regret" scored a 1.0 rating with a 4 share and was watched by 2.47 million people, making it Fox's highest-rated show of the night.

=== Critical response ===
Dennis Perkins of The A.V. Club gave this episode a B−, stating, "To the show’s credit, the episode itself makes only passing mention of the at-least numerically impressive feat, with the cold open seeing a once-again pistol-packing Maggie gunning down Gunsmoke’s Marshall Matt Dillon. Credited to Simpsons writing stalwart Bill Odenkirk, ‘Forgive and Regret’, instead, dedicates itself to telling a single story, once more revisiting the justifiably fraught (on both sides) father-son relationship between Abe and Homer Simpson."

Tony Sokol of Den of Geek gave the episode 3.5 out of 5 stars. He highlighted Dan Castellaneta's performance, Marge's comments, and the jokes involving Moe.

Jesse Schedeen of IGN felt the record-breaking episode was a missed opportunity to shake things up, possibly by killing Grampa.
