= Mosaner =

Mosaner is a surname. Notable people with the surname include:

- Amos Mosaner (born 1995), Italian curler
- Elena Mosaner, Russian-American hypnotherapist, author and filmmaker
