= King Leer =

- The Simpsons episode
- Episode no.: Season 29; Episode 16
- Directed by: Chris Clements
- Written by: Daniel Furlong; Zach Posner
- Production code: XABF10
- Original air date: April 15, 2018

Guest appearances
- Ray Liotta as Morty Szyslak; Debi Mazar as Minnie Szyslak; Jonathan Schmock as Johnny Bermuda Salesman

Episode chronology
← Previous "No Good Read Goes Unpunished"	Next → "Lisa Gets the Blues"
- The Simpsons season 29

"King Leer" is the sixteenth episode of the twenty-ninth season of the American animated television series The Simpsons, and the 634th episode of the series overall. The episode was directed by Chris Clements and written by Daniel Furlong and Zach Posner. It aired in the United States on Fox on April 15, 2018.

In this episode, Marge tries to help Moe and his family reconcile as they go to war over the family's mattress business. Ray Liotta and Debi Mazar guest starred. Maggie Simpson does not appear in the episode. The episode received positive reviews.

== Plot ==
At school, Bart has to choose an instrument to play in music class. Bart learns from the music teacher that if he breaks it, Homer will have to pay for it. Bart begins to taunt Homer with the threat of breaking his violin. Homer saves it one more time, only to break his beer mug, go berserk and smash the violin. Homer then goes to Moe's Tavern for a drink. Moe receives a phone call, rages at the caller, and angrily chases the customers out of the bar. Homer and Marge discover Moe leaving and follow him. They discover Moe fighting with his father, Morty Szyslak. Marge and Homer attempt to reunite the family by inviting Moe, his brother Marv, his sister Minnie, and his father over for dinner.

Before dinner, it is revealed that at one time Moe's family sold mattresses. Moe screwed it up when his father told him to sabotage their rival's store. Moe refused, and was tricked by the rival store, who sabotaged his family's stores with bed bugs, ultimately leaving them with three locations. At dinner, things are tense between Moe and his family members, so Marge and Homer bring a television into the dining room to show the Szyslayks the good times they had together. After seeing themselves together in a mattress commercial with a Christmas theme, they reconcile. Morty gives keys to his stores to Marv, Minnie, and finally Moe.

Springfield's residents gather at Moe's store, where Moe shows them a mattress ad he made with his siblings. He soon realizes that his brother and sister's intent was to sabotage him and make his store look bad by saying that people have died on his mattresses, including fat people and prisoners. The siblings begin to sabotage each other. Moe pops the inflatable gorilla in front of one of their stores. Marv and Minnie retaliate by controlling the up and down button outside of the store, constantly torturing Hans Moleman as he is trying out a mattress. Moe then floods their store, flushing out the customers inside. Marv and Moe get into a sword fight using signs. Marv finally throws a sign at Moe before taking off.

Marge goes to tell Morty that his children are fighting with each other, and she needs his help. At first he refuses, but Marge persuades him. Marge, Homer, and Morty arrive to see Moe announce that he will destroy his brother and sister's mattresses, and they can't destroy his, because his are in a secret place, which turns out to be the bar. Marge tells him that some families don't belong together. He accidentally breaks a jar of bugs and everyone flees the building, scratching themselves.

== Production ==
This is the first episode written by Daniel Furlong and Zach Posner. Furlong reached out of fellow Oneida County native and executive producer John Frink for a job and was eventually promoted to writer's assistant on the show. Executive producer Matt Selman had an idea for an episode about Moe and offered Furlong and his writing partner Posner the job to develop the script. It was then handed over to the writer's room for refinement. Furlong added some references from where he grew up such as Utica Wild Thighs being a parody of Buffalo Wild Wings. Selman described the episode as a Shakespearean drama about a mattress store empire.

In February 2018, Entertainment Weekly reported that Ray Liotta was cast as Moe's father, Morty, who is a cunning evil version of Moe. Liotta stated that the experience was fun, and he was able to reunite with producer David Mirkin, who directed Liotta in the 2001 film Heartbreakers. Debi Mazar was cast as Moe's sister Minnie.

== Cultural references ==
The credit scene is a recreation of the Mattress Man commercial from the 2002 film Punch-Drunk Love.

== Reception ==
Dennis Perkins of The A.V. Club gave this episode a B−, stating, "Fox’s synergistic Simpsons programming saw FXX run a mini-marathon of Moe all Sunday leading up to this Moe-centric outing...and The Simpsons’ longevity means that there’s more mediocre Moe (and, well, everyone else), than certified Moe classics. But 'King Leer' manages to mine Springfield’s least-reputable barkeep for enough quality Moe to at least remind us why he’s always been one of the show’s most reliable side characters."

Tony Sokol of Den of Geek gave the episode 3.5 out of 5 stars. He called it a high point of the season because of the side gags.

On release, "King Leer" scored a 1.0 (nielsen) rating with a 4 share with an estimated watch of 2.26 million people, making it Fox's highest rated show of the night.
