= Carl Carlson Rides Again =

- The Simpsons episode
- Episode no.: Season 34; Episode 14
- Directed by: Mike Frank Polcino
- Written by: Loni Steele Sosthand
- Production code: OABF07
- Original air date: February 26, 2023

Guest appearances
- John Autry II as Monk Murphy; Henry Louis Gates Jr. as himself; Dawnn Lewis as Naima

Episode chronology
← Previous "The Many Saints of Springfield"	Next → "Bartless"
- The Simpsons season 34

"Carl Carlson Rides Again" is the fourteenth episode of the thirty-fourth season of the American animated television series The Simpsons, and the 742nd episode overall. It aired in the United States on Fox on February 26, 2023. The episode was directed by Mike Frank Polcino and written by Loni Steele Sosthand.

In this episode, Carl learns the origins of his belt buckle after trading it for clothes for a date. The episode received positive reviews.

It is the first and only episode until now in which Lisa Simpson is absent, also making it the third episode in which she doesn't have any lines; the first two were "Chief of Hearts" and "Moho House".

== Plot ==
When Ned Flanders breaks his arm, Marge organizes the townsfolk to cook food for him. Homer has an idea to pretend to be hurt, so people will cook for him and his friends. Carl decides to end his participation in the scheme to lose weight for the bowling season. After he gets into shape, he wears a belt with a buckle depicting a bull rider to hold up his pants. While bowling, he meets a woman named Naima. They decide to meet again for a date at her restaurant.

Carl goes to get a haircut but has trouble choosing a style. The people at the barbershop tease his belt buckle. At the clothing store, he trades the belt buckle for clothes for his date. On the date, Naima asks about Carl’s background, and he makes things up to impress Naima. She realizes that he is lying and tells him to find out who he is. At Moe's, Carl says that the belt buckle was the only item he had from his parents. The others become uncomfortable when discussing Carl’s background, so he leaves.

Homer and Carl decide to retrieve the belt buckle. They learn it has been sold to the Rich Texan, who sold it to Henry Louis Gates Jr. Dr. Gates researches Carl’s background, and he learns that Carl descends from a slave who became a cowboy, and his father was a bull rider who won the belt buckle as a prize.

Carl decided to ride a bull and invites his friends and Naima to watch. Although he only lasts a few seconds, Naima is happy that Carl found out about his background. She donates blood to him as he is sent to the hospital for his bull riding injuries.

== Production ==
Carl's adoptive parents were introduced in the twenty-fourth season episode "The Saga of Carl," and the producers wanted to explore another part of his origins. After writing last season's "The Sound of Bleeding Gums," based on her deaf brother's experience, Loni Steele Sosthand wrote this episode based on her own experience struggling for identity as a mixed race person. She noted that black cowboys were being featured in Hollywood recently such as the Lawmen: Bass Reeves television series produced by Taylor Sheridan. To research information for the episode, she listened to "The Black Cowboy Podcast." Alex Désert, who replaced Hank Azaria as the voice of Carl, also related to the story of Carl since he is of Haitian descent but grew up in a Jewish neighborhood.

Author Henry Louis Gates Jr. appeared as himself. He was surprised that the episode would also mention his show, Finding Your Roots. Dawnn Lewis provided the voice of Naima.

== Cultural references ==
Carl appears on the television series Finding Your Roots, hosted by Henry Louis Gates Jr. The songs "Beyond" by Leon Bridges and "Black Cowboy" by Eek-A-Mouse were featured in the episode. Eek-A-Mouse was paid $20,000 for his song's appearance.

== Reception ==
=== Viewing figures ===
The episode earned a 0.33 rating and was watched by 1.18 million viewers, which was the most watched show on Fox that night.

=== Critical response ===
Tony Sokol of Den of Geek gave the episode a 4 out of 5 stars. He praised the story of Carl finding his identity along with a romantic interest. He also felt the jokes were good, but not great.

John Schwarz of Bubbleblabber gave the episode a 9 out of 10. He highlighted how the episode handed the delicate subject of Carl's identity with regard to race. He also liked how Alex Désert's portrayal of Carl is growing.

Jesse David Fox of Vulture stated that this episode stands with the best of the classic episodes.

=== Awards and nominations ===
Writer Loni Steele Sosthand won the Writers Guild of America Award for Television: Animation at the 76th Writers Guild of America Awards for this episode.
