= Step Brother from the Same Planet =

- The Simpsons episode
- Episode no.: Season 34; Episode 8
- Directed by: Matthew Faughnan
- Written by: Dan Vebber
- Production code: UABF22
- Original air date: November 20, 2022

Guest appearances
- Carol Kane as Blythe; Melissa McCarthy as Calvin

Episode chronology
← Previous "From Beer to Paternity"	Next → "When Nelson Met Lisa"
- The Simpsons season 34

"Step Brother from the Same Planet" is the eighth episode of the thirty-fourth season of the American animated television series The Simpsons, and the 736th episode overall. It aired in the United States on Fox on November 20, 2022. The episode was directed by Matthew Faughnan and written by Dan Vebber.

In this episode, Homer becomes jealous of Grampa's girlfriend's son when Grampa treats him better than Homer. The episode features guest star Melissa McCarthy as Calvin and received mixed reviews.

== Plot ==
The Simpsons are at the park, and Lisa sees her classmates at a party, but she was not invited. They also run into Grampa and his new girlfriend, Blythe. He is planning to move in with her. At dinner, they meet Blythe's son, Calvin, whom Grampa treats better than Homer. This makes Homer jealous.

While retrieving Grampa's things at the retirement home, Bart and Lisa learn that his rent is still covered. They decide to throw a party there to make Lisa popular. The kids like it, so Lisa wants to throw more parties. Meanwhile, Homer is allergic to the wax Marge used to polish the house surfaces, so he is forced to room with Calvin where they constantly fight. One day, blinded by his eyedrops, Grampa comes in and praises Homer while he was imitating Calvin. Similarly, Grampa berates Calvin when he imitates Homer. Calvin and Homer come to an understanding with each other and plan to show Grampa how he makes Homer feel.

Homer and Calvin enter a taxidermy convention, and Homer's entry is two shells with eyes. He berates Homer until he sees that the shells represent them. Grampa apologizes to Homer and says that his behavior is his own fault. Meanwhile, Lisa's parties get out of control, so she calls the police to stop them. On the way out, Lisa sits in the police car and convinces Chief Wiggum to pretend to arrest her to make her look cool.

Later, Blythe breaks up with Grampa, and she and Calvin go to Africa with her new boyfriend.

== Production ==
At San Diego Comic-Con 2022, Matt Selman announced that Melissa McCarthy would guest voice as a rival for Grampa Simpson's affection. Selman stated that the producers were fans of McCarthy and were able to book her at the height of her career. It was later revealed that McCarthy's character is a boy named Calvin.

Carol Kane appeared as a guest voice for Blythe. She previously voiced Maggie Simpson in an uncredited guest role in the second season episode "Bart vs. Thanksgiving."

== Cultural references ==
Homer uses a Pikachu hat to make Calvin look like him. The song "Yours Is an Empty Hope" by the band Nightwish plays in the scene where Homer and Calvin prank each other.

== Reception ==
=== Viewing figures ===
"Step Brother from the Same Planet" earned a 0.3 rating and 1.21 million viewers in its initial airing, which was the most watched show on Fox that night.

=== Critical response ===
Tony Sokol of Den of Geek gave the episode 4 out of 5 stars. He praised the jokes that still allowed the sadness to come out. He also liked Lisa's rebellious side and how Grampa did not change how he felt about Homer. He also wanted Blythe to have more scenes.

Matthew Swigonski of Bubbleblabber gave the episode a 4 out of 10. He felt the episode was a step backwards for the season with a straightforward and repetitive story.
