= Jeffrey Rose =

American hypnotherapist

Jeffrey Rose, CMH
- Occupations: hypnotherapist, addiction recovery coach, television host, lecturer, writer
- Known for: trance inducted behavior modification
- Website: ahcenter.com

Jeffrey Rose, CMH, is an American clinical hypnotist, lecturer, sleep specialist, addiction recovery coach, cable TV show host, NY State legislative coordinator of Start School Later and writer.

Rose is the founder and director of the Advanced Hypnosis Center, which he established in New York City in 1999 and the Advanced Hypnosis Center in Rockland County, N.Y., in 2005.

Rose is a colleague of Elena Beloff. At his suggestion, Beloff was cast as the hypnotist at the center of Philippe Parreno's multimedia art extravaganza "H{N0YPN(Y}OSIS".

== Education ==
Rose received his bachelor's degree from New York University. He is certified by the International Medical Dental Hypnosis Association (IMDHA), National Guild of Hypnotists, and the International Association of Counselors and Therapists. He has received continued education at Integrative Healthcare Symposium.

== Television appearances ==
Rose, who treats sleep problems in adolescents and adults, is the NY State legislative coordinator of Start School Later. Rose has appeared and been featured in stories on hypnosis in various media.

Rose interviewed Dr. James Samuel Gordon, the world-renowned expert in using mind-body medicine.

Dr. Mark Hyman (doctor) and David Perlmutter were guests on his Holistic Healing cable show.

On April 21, 2016, Rose appeared as an expert on New York City's PIX11 News to discuss how political candidates use hypnosis techniques to sway voters.

== Radio interviews ==
Rose was the guest on Dr. Ronald Hoffman's Intelligent Medicine Podcast on April 9, 2015 on the "Hypnosis as a tool for overcoming bad habits" episode.

== Published articles ==
Since 2003, Rose has published many articles for health related publications in his areas of expertise.

"Nutrition 101: Carbohydrates" from RECOVER Magazine ine by Jeffrey Rose, Clinical Hypnotist and Nutritionist

“Dealing with Stress” from RECOVER Magazine May 2005 by Jeffrey Rose, Clinical Hypnotist

“Sugar and Health” From RECOVER Magazine March 2005 by Jeffrey Rose, New York Hypnotist & Nutritionist

“Smoking and Addiction” From RECOVER Magazine January 2005 by Jeffrey Rose, Clinical Hypnotist

“Exercise and Recovery” From RECOVER Magazine May 2004 by Jeffrey Rose, Clinical Hypnotist and Nutritionist

“Easing Recovery with Omega-3 Fatty Acid Supplementation” from RECOVER Magazine March 2004 by Jeffrey Rose, Clinical Hypnotist and Nutritionist

“Sleep Hygiene for Health” RECOVER Magazine December 2004 by Jeffrey Rose, Clinical Hypnotist

“Caffeine, Health and Recovery” from RECOVER Magazine July 2004 by Jeffrey Rose, Clinical Hypnotist and Nutritionist

“Hypnotherapy: Tap Your Subconscious” from RECOVER Magazine November 2003 by Jeffrey Rose, CMH

“HYPNOTHERAPY FOR YOUR PATIENTS” from PCI JOURNAL Volume 11 November 4, 2003

Rose has appeared or been featured on WPIX New York's “Dr. Steve Show,” CBS’ “The Early Show”, CNN American Morning news segment “Kick the Butt,” the “Tyra Banks Show” and Arise TV's Entertainment 360.

== Magazine articles ==
Jeffrey Rose was featured in Martha Stewart Living's article on fear of flying, “Mind Over Matter", Men's Vogue, and New York's Promenade Magazine. Rose was also featured in The Observer's article "Countdown to Bliss".
