= Zaritsas: Russian Women in New York =

- Directed by: Elena Mosaner
- Written by: Elena Mosaner
- Produced by: Elena Mosaner (co-producer); Ken Christmas; Vincent D'Onofrio
- Cinematography: Eun-ah Lee; Anja Matthes
- Edited by: Ben Abrams
- Music by: Oliver James
- Release date: 2010
- Running time: 72 minutes
- Country: United States
- Language: English

Zaritsas: Russian Women in New York is a 2010 documentary film written and directed by Russian-born American filmmaker Elena Mosaner. The film was co-produced by American actor Vincent D'Onofrio.

Zaritsas debuted at the Cine Gear Expo at The Studios at Paramount in June 2010. It screened at the Astoria Film Festival. The documentary was also screened at the Tribeca Grand Hotel and at the Anthology Film Archives. The film also aired several times on RTVi in America, Russia, Poland, Ukraine beginning on December 26, 2012. The film became available on Amazon.com on June 9, 2012.

After living in New York City for a few years, Mosaner made a film about American stereotyping of Russian women as mail-order brides and sex workers which dominated opinion in the early 1990s after the collapse of the Soviet Union. In the film Elena Beloff followed five Russian women for six months, interviewing each one in her environment: A rapper in a Sheepshead Bay Church; a saleswoman at La Perla Madison Avenue Boutique; a model at home; a showgirl at a Brighton Beach Restaurant and an exotic dancer at Scores strip club. Women Around Town noted Zaritsas: Russian Women In New York, by Elena Beloff, once an exchange student and now a New School filmmaker, follows five émigrés’ hopes and dreams in the new country, and an exotic dancer’s journey back from the pit life tossed her into – rebutting the stigmatized image of Russian girls as cold-hearted gold-diggers. According to an article in Voices from the Garage magazine, The film is named Zaritsas (The Queens) because of a Russian song about women locked in a cage of societal judgment much like the medieval Queens were trapped in their castles.

Produced by Elena Mosaner, co-produced by Ken Christmas and Vincent D'Onofrio, cinematography by Eun-ah Lee; film editing by Ben Abrams; original music by Oliver James and Robert Eldridge, additional music by Tony Sokol and the song "Budem Vmeste" was written by Elena Mosaner and produced by Tony Sokol and Joe Bohmer. The cast included Elena Mosaner, Yuri Binder, Katya Chirkina, Michael Gross, Sasha Ignatenko, Irina Isaeva, Tatiana Lissovskaia, Elena Orie and Adnan Sarhan.
