= Lisa Gets the Blues =

- The Simpsons episode
- Episode no.: Season 29; Episode 17
- Directed by: Bob Anderson
- Written by: David Silverman; Brian Kelley
- Production code: XABF11
- Original air date: April 22, 2018

Guest appearance
- Trombone Shorty as himself

Episode features
- Chalkboard gag: "I will not bet with Bart on the Final Four"
- Couch gag: Homer, Marge, Bart, Lisa and Maggie attempt to do a lumberjack-themed gag.

Episode chronology
← Previous "King Leer"	Next → "Forgive and Regret"
- The Simpsons season 29

"Lisa Gets the Blues" is the seventeenth episode of the twenty-ninth season of the American animated television series The Simpsons, and the 635th episode of the series overall. The episode was directed by Bob Anderson and written by David Silverman and Brian Kelley. It aired in the United States on Fox on April 22, 2018.

In this episode, the Simpsons visit New Orleans to cheer up Lisa after she gets the yips and loses her ability to play her saxophone. Musician Trombone Shorty appeared as himself. The episode received mixed reviews.

The episode was dedicated in memory of R. Lee Ermey who had guest starred twice on the show as Colonel Leslie "Hap" Hapablap in the episodes "Sideshow Bob's Last Gleaming" and "Waiting for Duffman". He died on April 15, 2018.

== Plot ==
Marge attempts to make Lisa play sax in front of the family at home, but after her music teacher told her to give up, Lisa is unable to perform. From the Internet, she finds out she has an potentially incurable disorder called the yips, a condition which can disable an expert performer for no reason whatsoever.

Marge plans a trip to Gainesville, Florida, much to the dismay of the rest of the Simpson family, for the 100th birthday of Marge's half-great-aunt Eunice, in hopes that Lisa will regain her confidence. Homer expects that the plane may get disrupted in hopes of avoiding going, but not even a passenger seated between two morbidly obese passengers is willing to protest. Bart then kicks the seat before him, creating a domino effect that degenerates into a fight which finally forces the plane to change its destination to New Orleans, much to the passengers' relief. Marge decides to approach the trip as a chance to cheer Lisa up, but decides to give up after Lisa mopes about a jazz band that are celebrating 98% humidity. Marge resolves that Homer would handle the situation better.

While unsuccessfully trying to make Lisa happy, Homer goes on an "eating binge" throughout the city's numerous restaurants, eventually barfing at New Orleans' "vomitoriums". While visiting the city's landmarks, he and Lisa find a statue of Louis Armstrong that comes to life upon Lisa's wish. Louis urges Lisa to enjoy the city and listen to Homer. Meanwhile, Marge tries to make New Orleans interesting for Bart, whose boredom subsides upon finding a voodoo shop, where he plots revenge against Jimbo, Dolph and Kearney after they made him act as Little Orphan Annie in front of the school cafeteria (down to having his pupils whitened with correction fluid) because of a prank Bart played on Jimbo, knowing he uses his hat to cover his baldness.

The bandleader of The Spotted Cat, a jazz bar Lisa and Homer go in, calls Lisa by name, actually being "Bleeding Gums" Murphy's nephew, the deceased jazzman (whose name was apparently Oscar) telling him that Lisa was the most promising musician he knew (much to his nephew's chagrin). He finally convinces Lisa to play his sax in spite of her protests, rekindling her love for the instrument. Back in Springfield, she keeps on playing, and the ghost of Louis Armstrong reappears, sadly wishing he was alive again.

The post-credits scene features Homer, Lisa and Bart eating beignets at the Café Du Monde. Homer comments that next week's episode will surpass Gunsmoke's episode count. When Bart mentions Gunsmoke's radio show (which lasted for 432 episodes), Homer force-feeds Bart with a beignet.

== Production ==
=== Development ===
In July 2017 at San Diego Comic-Con, writer and consulting producer David Silverman said he was working on an episode where the Simpsons travel to New Orleans for the New Orleans Jazz & Heritage Festival. Unlike the fourth season episode "A Streetcar Named Marge", which created controversy with the city, executive producer Al Jean said that this episode would feature the city in a positive light. Director Bob Anderson relied on photographs and research material to make the city appear authentic. Silverman wrote a montage of Homer eating in various New Orleans restaurants.

=== Casting ===
Musician Trombone Shorty appears in the episode as himself and also plays his trombone. He had previously played music with Silverman outside his New Orleans studio.

== Reception ==
=== Viewing figures ===
"Lisa Gets the Blues" scored a 4 share and was watched by 2.19 million people, making it Fox's highest rated show of the night.

=== Critical response ===
Dennis Perkins of The A.V. Club gave this episode a C+, stating, "It’s momentarily affecting, especially with Smith giving voice to Lisa’s pain, but 'Lisa Gets The Blues' quickly scatters any intention of recapturing the old Lisa Simpson tragicomic resonance over a succession of self-referential gags, inconsistently sketched character beats, and some of the most indulgent tourist rubbernecking the show has ever done."

Tony Sokol of Den of Geek gave the episode 4 out of 5 stars. He stated that there was more respect for New Orleans than in "A Streetcar Named Marge," but it meant there were fewer jokes at its expense. He said there were some laughs, but they come up short of the classics.

Kevin Allman of the New Orleans–based newspaper Gambit said the episode did not compare to classic seasons but had some laughs. He also said locals would be pleased to see local landmarks rendered in animation.

Mike Scott of The Times-Picayune analyzed a promotional image of Homer and Lisa standing in the 200 block of Bourbon Street and concluded that, unlike the broad animation in "A Streetcar Named Marge," the animators were able to draw many of the details that one would see if a person was standing there.

== Eating montage recreation ==
In August 2019, Katrin von Niederhäusern of Stockholm and Janine Wiget of Zürich posted a Youtube video showing them in a live-action shot-by-shot recreation of the montage of Homer eating in various New Orleans restaurants. The food cost them approximately five hundred dollars with several restaurants opting not to charge them for food. Filming the video took seven days using a mobile phone and tripod. The video drew the attention of The Simpsons creators, who invited them to a table read of the show.
