= Rob Oliver =

American TV director

- Born: 1977 (age 48–49); Michigan, U.S.
- Occupation: Animation director
- Spouse: Diana
- Children: 2

Rob Oliver (born 1977) is a director for The Simpsons. He has also been a character layout artist, storyboard artist, assistant director, second unit director, and technical director over the course of his long career on the show. He graduated from Owosso (MI) High School in 1995, and the next year he was hired to draw characters on The Simpsons. He has worked on hundreds of episodes. Rob has also worked on Simpsons commercials, DVD menus, DVD boxes, and consumer products for the brand. His Renault Kangoo commercial was a mix of live-action and animation. Received an Emmy nomination for directing "Holidays of Future Passed", an episode of The Simpsons. He conceptualized many of the visuals for the episode himself, while storyboarding it. Two of his artists—Charles Ragins and Dima Malanitchev—won individual Emmy awards for their work on his "Treehouse of Horror XXIV", for The Simpsons. Currently he is directing The New Simpsons Movie.

== The Simpsons episodes ==
He has directed the following episodes:

- "The Boys of Bummer" (2007)
- "Funeral for a Fiend" (2007)
- "The Good, the Sad and the Drugly" (2009)
- "Rednecks and Broomsticks" (with Bob Anderson) (2009)
- "Holidays of Future Passed" (2011)
- "Adventures in Baby-Getting" (2012)
- "Treehouse of Horror XXIV" (2013)
- "Blazed and Confused" (2014)
- "Sky Police" (2015)
- "Puffless" (2015)
- "Barthood" (2015)
- "The Burns Cage" (2016)
- "The Town" (2016)
- "The Nightmare After Krustmas" (2016)
- "Kamp Krustier" (2017)
- "The Serfsons" (2017)
- "Gone Boy" (2017)
- "Forgive and Regret" (2018)
- "My Way or the Highway to Heaven" (2018)
- "Mad About the Toy" (2019)
- "E My Sports" (2019)
- "Marge the Lumberjill" (2019)
- "Thanksgiving of Horror" (2019)
- "Better Off Ned" (2020)
- "I, Carumbus" (2020)
- "Sorry Not Sorry" (2020)
- "Yokel Hero" (2021)
- "The Star of the Backstage" (2021)
- "Mothers and Other Strangers" (2021)
- "My Octopus and a Teacher" (2022)
- "Treehouse of Horror XXXIII" (2022)
- "From Beer to Paternity" (2022)
- "Bartless" (2023)
- "Bart 'N' Frink" (2025)
- "Guess Who's Coming to Skinner" (2025)

He was also the Additional Sequence Director in The Simpsons Movie.
