= Elena Mosaner =

Russian-American hypnotherapist

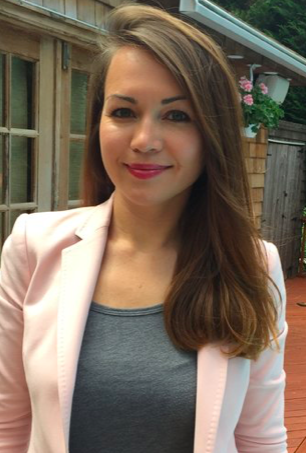
- Hypnotherapist, personal coach, author, filmmaker, founder of AlphaMind Method Elena Mosaner
- Occupations: Hypnotherapist, personal coach, author, filmmaker
- Known for: Weight loss, performance anxiety, stage fright, test taking, smoking cessation, insomnia, fears and phobias, coaching and filmmaking
- Website: www.elenamosaner.com

Elena Mosaner, formerly known as Beloff, is a Russian-born American National Guild of Hypnotists (NGH) Certified hypnotherapist and professional certified coach by ICF (International Coach Federation), author and filmmaker. She has her own private practice in New York City and the San Diego Area. Mosaner founded the practice Inside Hypnosis in New York City, and is the founder of the AlphaMind self hypnosis app.

== Hypnosis ==
Mosaner hypnotized 100 people at one time for the film "The Crowd," which was shot in January 2015 by Darius Khondji. Elena Mosaner was cast at the suggestion of Advanced Hypnosis Center's Jeffrey Rose. "The Crowd" was shown at French artist Philippe Parreno's art installation "H{N)Y P N(Y}OSIS" at New York City's Park Avenue Armory. The show opened on June 11, 2015.

In 2016 Elena Mosaner was interviewed by Good Morning America about hypnosis for exercise motivation. She hypnotizes a client to train for a NYC half marathon and explains how hypnosis works.

In 2017, The New York Times featured Elena Mosaner as one of the top clinical hypnotists in New York City for weight loss. Several of Mosaner's clients were interviewed about the changes they were able to achieve through hypnosis.

In 2020, Mosaner founded AlphaMind, a mobile app for guided self-hypnosis and mental reprogramming. The app integrates techniques from neuro-linguistic programming (NLP) and performance coaching, and was developed in response to rising stress and mental health concerns during the pandemic.

Elena, who lived in a few countries, including Russia, Ukraine, U.S.A., Italy, and Brazil, speaks three languages fluently: Russian, English and Portuguese. She holds Bachelor in Science in Film and Media from The New School University, and a Masters degree in Science from University of Texas at Dallas (UTD). Mosaner sees clients all over the world in her main office in New York City, and online.

== Filmmaking and writing ==
As a filmmaker, Mosaner's first film, the documentary Zaritsas: Russian Women in New York (2010), screened at the Astoria/Long Island Film Festival in October 2010.Zaritsas was produced by actor Vincent D'Onofrio. Since then Elena Mosaner has formed her own production company EB Productions, LLC. Mosaner's films tend to explore the concepts of stereotypes and misconceptions.

On February 16, 2013, Elena Mosaner uploaded a video of a gay man standing up to a homophobic subway "preacher". The "Gay Subway Hero" caught the attention of the Internet and the media and went viral gaining over 800,000 views in just a few days.

In February 2014, Elena Mosaner and veteran science fiction writer John Zakour collaborated on "Quantum Voyeur", an interactive novel about time traveling tourists. The novella was published by Serealites Press.

Mosaner appeared as a featured hypnotist on the "Superhumans" episode of The History Channel series In Search Of...
