= Ryan Koh =

American television writer and producer (born 1977)

- Born: September 10, 1977 (age 49); Milford, Connecticut, United States
- Occupations: Television writer, producer
- Years active: 2007–present

Ryan Koh is an American television writer. He is currently a writer and co-executive producer for The Simpsons. He has also worked as a writer and producer on The Office, New Girl, Workaholics, and Cougar Town.

== Television career ==
=== Early career ===
Koh began his writing career as a writer on the animated series Kappa Mikey and as a staff writer on the fourth season of The Office. As well as co-writing the webisode series Kevin's Loan with Anthony Farrell, he also contributed two full length scripts for the series. After two seasons, he departed and became a writer for Cougar Town in 2009 and became a co-producer on the show's second season. For his work on The Office, Koh was nominated for three Writers Guild of America awards. He has won two Emmys for his work on The Simpsons.

He went to Harvard University where he wrote for the Harvard Lampoon.

=== Episodes by Koh ===
==== Kappa Mikey ====
- "Like Ozu Like Son" (1.24)
- "Go Nard Hunting" (2.6) (with James Harvey)
- "Night of the Werepuff" (2.15) (with Robert Berens and Conrad Klein)
- "The Karaoke Episode" (2.16) & (2.17) (with Sean Lahey)
- "Mikey's Memoirs" (2.18) (with Walt Gardner)
- "Seven From LilyMu" (2.19) (with Walt Gardner)
- "Live LilyMu" (2.23) (with Robert Berens)
- "Mitsuki Butterfly" (2.24)

==== The Office ====
- "Business Ethics" (5.02)
- "Heavy Competition" (5.24)

==== Cougar Town ====
- "A Woman in Love (It's Not Me)" (1.06)
- "Finding Out" (1.24)
- "The Same Old You" (2.10)
- "Lost Children" (2.13) (with Sam Laybourne)
- "Money Becomes King" (3.9)

==== Workaholics ====
- "Ders Comes in Handy" (3.9)

==== New Girl ====
- "Parents" (2.08)
- "Quick Hardening Caulk" (2.19)
- "Longest Night Ever" (3.09
- "Sister II" (3.17)
- "Dance" (3.22)

==== The Simpsons ====
- "Dad Behavior" (28.08)
- "Singin' in the Lane" (29.07)
- "Krusty the Clown" (30.08)
- "The Winter of Our Monetized Content" (31.01)
- "Marge The Lumberjlll" (31.06)
- "The Dad-Feelings Limited" (32.11)
- "Bart the Cool Kid" (33.15)
- "Treehouse of Horror XXXIII" (34.06)
- "When Nelson Met Lisa" (34.09)
- "Game Done Changed" (34.10)
- "Lisa Gets an F1" (35.12)
- "Sashes to Sashes" (37.7)

== Awards and nominations ==
Year	Award	Category	Nominated work	Result
2008	Writers Guild of America Awards	Comedy Series	The Office	Nominated
2009	NAACP Image Awards	Outstanding Writing in a Comedy Series	The Office: "Business Ethics"	Nominated
2009	Writers Guild of America Awards	Comedy Series	The Office	Nominated
2010	Writers Guild of America Awards	Comedy Series	The Office	Nominated
2017	Primetime Emmy Awards	Outstanding Animated Program	The Simpsons: "The Town"	Nominated
2018	Primetime Emmy Awards	Outstanding Animated Program	The Simpsons: "Gone Boy"	Nominated
2019	Primetime Emmy Awards	Outstanding Animated Program	The Simpsons: "Mad About the Toy"	Won
2019	Writers Guild of America Awards	Animation	The Simpsons: "Krusty the Clown"	Nominated
2020	Primetime Emmy Awards	Outstanding Animated Program	The Simpsons: "Thanksgiving of Horror"	Nominated
2021	Primetime Emmy Awards	Outstanding Animated Program	The Simpsons: "The Dad-Feelings Limited"	Nominated
2022	Primetime Emmy Awards	Outstanding Animated Program	The Simpsons: "Pixelated and Afraid"	Nominated
2023	Primetime Emmy Awards	Outstanding Animated Program	The Simpsons: "Treehouse of Horror XXXIII"	Won
2024	Primetime Emmy Awards	Outstanding Animated Program	The Simpsons: "Night of the Living Wage"	Nominated
