= Broti Gupta =

Comedy writer and podcaster

- Born: December 28, 1993 (age 32); India
- Education: Wellesley College
- Occupation: Comedy writer
- Children: 1

Broti Gupta (born December 28, 1993) is an American comedy writer and podcaster. She currently serves as a writer and supervising producer for The Simpsons and co-hosts a podcast called Lecture Hall with actress Dylan Gelula.

== Early life and education ==
Gupta grew up in Cincinnati, where she attended the Seven Hills School, graduating in 2012. She then attended Wellesley College, graduating in 2016 with a degree in English.

== Career ==
Gupta has worked on Speechless, Carol's Second Act, Friends from College, and The Simpsons. She has written humor articles and essays for McSweeney's, The New Yorker magazine, The New York Times and The Washington Post. She has also performed in stand-up comedy. Her posts on X are frequently featured in roundups of humorous tweets.

Gupta co-hosts the Lecture Hall podcast with actress Dylan Gelula. The show was named one of "The 15 Best Educational Podcasts for You to Expand Your Mind" by Oprah Daily in 2020. Past guests include Andy Richter, Ayo Edebiri, Rachel Sennott and more. The show was launched in 2020. In Vulture, Sean Malin wrote that as the show developed, Gupta and her cohost "hon[ed] a bone-dry yet insane repartee that sneaks up on guests and listeners alike... While the tone of Lecture Hall remains dopey, each conversation thrums with wit and cultural curiosity."

Gupta lives in Los Angeles.
