= Tony Sokol =

American playwright, writer and composer (born 1963)

Tony Sokol (born March 23, 1963, in Brooklyn, New York, United States) is an American playwright, writer and composer, best known for writing the theatrical horror series La Commedia Del Sangue: Vampyr Theatre in New York City.

As a musician, Sokol played guitar, bass or sang in Queer Jesus, The Others, Busted Chops, Head First, 4Q, Death of the Party and the Abstract 4. He appeared several times on WBAI-FM with jazz vocalist Devorah Simpson, as well as backing her on live sessions on the station on guitar and with his band. Sokol wrote incidental music for the films Woman, Man, Gun and Hide Me, both directed by Jenice Malecki; The Gauntlet and Quest, directed by David Burgos; plus Zaritsas: Russian Women in New York, directed by Elena Beloff.

He wrote songs and incidental music for over a dozen films and over twenty stage productions and appeared on the Joan Rivers (TV) Show, Strange Universe, WNEW-FM, WBAI-FM, WABC-AM, WFUV-FM, WFMU-FM, BBC-Television and Radio, Britain's "The Girlie Show," bars and nightclubs throughout the tri-state area and over a dozen Manhattan Public-access television TV shows. He also wrote, produced and occasionally directed or acted in the stageshow Vampyr Theatre, which ran 13 plays in New York in the early 1990s; the radio play "The Excommunication of God;" two short films, more than 20 produced plays and the rock opera AssassiNation: We Killed Kennedy.

Sokol wrote skits for several comedy troupes and Manhattan Public Access shows including Young, Gifted and Broke. He wrote several skits for the radio show Drama With Miss Kitty, and appeared with the actress on such radio programs as The Black, Jew and Gay Comedy Hour on Rawenergyradio.com. He also co-hosted a cable call-in show with Elena Beloff on Manhattan Public Access.

== La Commedia del Sangue ==
In 1986, Sokol wrote and performed "I was thirsty and you drowned me," a vampiric ritual performance art piece at The Anarchist's Switchboard, Centerfold and other venues, along with other spoken word and musical performances throughout New York City. After writing the play, "The Summer After," for director Rosalie Triana, she asked him if there were any other theatrical works he had written. He responded by turning the vampire rituals into a series of plays "for vampires" which were staged throughout Manhattan in theatres and clubs beginning in 1992 and ending in 1997. Thirteen plays were produced, including "Let Us Prey," which Michael Musto, reviewed for the Daily News on January 28, 1994, writing "Every bit as weird as it sounds, "Prey"—written by horror/comedy scribe TONY SOKOL for the troupe La Commedia Del Sangue—presents its eerie rituals with conviction, unabashedly lacing the vampires' ruthless survival tactics with more of a raw sexuality than the misty romanticism they're usually diluted by."

== AssassiNation: We Killed Kennedy ==
Beginning in November 2003, on the 40th anniversary of the assassination of John F. Kennedy, Sokol wrote, directed and performed the rock opera "AssassiNation: We Killed Kennedy" at the Bowery Poetry Club, Don Hill's and other New York and New Jersey music and theater venues. Sokol formed the band Death of the Party and used guest singers from New York City bands to play various conspirators. After the performances, the band renamed itself The Abstract Four and continued to play New York City area clubs.

== Plays produced ==
Sokol has had his plays produced by several New York theatrical troupes. Among these: "Frankenstein Walks the Wolfman,” which Time Out New York favorably compared to the horror movie Scream; "You Must Have Been a Beautiful Baby,” "Baby Jane on Training Wheels", "How You Slice It", "Death Takes a Valium," "Cosmic Inertia", "The Wack", "Factually Incorrect", "Weight Loss by Vivisection" by Creative Artists Laboratory". "You Must Have Been a Beautiful Baby" and "Baby Jane on Training Wheels" by Spotlight On Productions; "You Must Have Been a Beautiful Baby", "The Intervention," "How to Skip Alimony Through Voluntary Manslaughter," Produced by The Irish Arts Center/Company of Impossible Dreams, NYC, 1999, and "Just Us Served". "How You Slice It" was revived by producer Laura Ludwig and performed at Eco Books and was recorded and broadcast by the Museum of Sound. “You Must Have Been a Beautiful Baby” has been revived by several theater troupes and was published in its entirety in Criminal Defense Weekly. Sokol was a writer, performer and co-producer of Insightful Riot, an evening of bad taste standup comedy at the New York Comedy Club. Sokol's play "Everybody ODs" was revived by The Collective in New Bedford, Mass., in March 2017.

== Music for film and theater ==
Tony Sokol wrote the music for his short films Don't Forget, Hire the Vet and 970-SPIT in 1988. It led to his writing music for such films as Jenice Malecki's Hide Me and Man, Woman, Gun; John Tranchina's Just Beyond the Door; David Burgos' The Quest and The Gauntlet, and other independent films. He also wrote music for New Moon's production of No Exit, White Rabbit Theatre's production of Bubby's Shadow and other theatrical performances. He recently contributed music to Elena Beloff's documentary on Russian immigrant women in America, Zaritsas: Russian Women in New York and the bank robbery film Desperate Fate.

== Other writing ==
Sokol's poetry and short stories have been published in Oghamstone, The Urban Magazine of Arts, Nut Magnet and other magazines. Sokol wrote for Wicked Mystic, Delirium and Nighttimer magazines. He was an abstract writer at PR Newswire for over twenty years. Sokol is the culture editor at Den of Geek, where he reviews films and TV, and conducts celebrity interviews with such artists as Marilyn Manson, Malcolm McDowell, and others, as well as writing on the music, true crime and the occult. He is television editor at Entertainment Voice magazine. Sokol was senior writer and editor at Daily Offbeat and senior writer at KpopStarz. Sokol wrote articles, film reviews and interviews with such artists as Hudson Leick and Zeena Schreck for Chiseler. He was contributing editor at Coed.com, and was a regular contributor to Alt Variety, Inside the Reel, The Silver Tongue, Bedlam and other magazines. Sokol was co-head writer, along with Jim Knipfel of the New York weekly magazine Smashpipe.
