= 'Tis the 30th Season =

- The Simpsons episode
- Episode no.: Season 30; Episode 10
- Directed by: Lance Kramer
- Story by: Jeff Westbrook
- Teleplay by: John Frink; Joel H. Cohen
- Production code: YABF02
- Original air date: December 9, 2018

Guest appearance
- Jane Lynch as Jeanie

Episode features
- Chalkboard gag: "The fat man who works one night a year is my dad"
- Couch gag: In a spoof of The Empire Strikes Back, Bart cuts off Wampa Homer's hand while they and the rest of the family say "Merry Christmas!".

Episode chronology
← Previous "Daddicus Finch"	Next → "Mad About the Toy"
- The Simpsons season 30

"'Tis the 30th Season" is the tenth episode of the thirtieth season of the American animated television series The Simpsons, and the 649th episode overall. The episode was directed by Lance Kramer with a story by Jeff Westbrook and teleplay by John Frink and Joel H. Cohen. It aired in the United States on Fox on December 9, 2018.

In this episode, Marge becomes stressed as Christmas approaches, so the family takes her on a vacation to Florida, but the accommodations are worse than expected. Jane Lynch guest starred as Jeanie. The episode received negative reviews.

== Plot ==
After Thanksgiving dinner, Bart and Lisa give Marge and Homer their Christmas lists, asking for only one present: a smart TV that costs $2,400. Seeing a commercial for a Black Friday sale at the Sprawl-Mart, Marge and Homer plan a strategy to take advantage of it. Marge waits in line overnight at the store, giving Gil Gunderson some of her winter clothing so he can keep warm. Homer wakes up at 2:30 in the morning to take her place as planned, but gets his scarf caught in the front door and knocks himself unconscious.

When the Sprawl-Mart opens at 6:00, Marge hurries to get a smart TV, but stops to help Gil get a present for his granddaughter. By the time she finishes, the shelves have been picked clean. In addition, Gil immediately sells the present to Reverend Lovejoy at a greatly inflated price. As Marge becomes increasingly stressed over the approach of Christmas, Homer and the children secretly book a vacation at a theme park and resort in Florida, then kidnap Marge by drugging her tea to put her to sleep. By the time she wakes up, the entire family is in the car and driving through Tennessee on the way to Florida.

Upon reaching the resort, they find themselves booked into a cramped hotel room with an extremely low ceiling. Homer urges Bart and Lisa to act as if they are enjoying themselves for Marge's sake, but the theme park turns out to be full of bizarre, frightening rides and obscure cartoon characters. Bart and Lisa complain to the manager, Jeanie, saying that the site looks nothing like the pictures on its web page. When she ignores them, Bart vows revenge. The Simpsons finally admit to each other that they are not enjoying the trip and decide to leave quickly so they can make it home by Christmas. Bart scares Jeanie by removing the heads from the animatronic figures in the Hall of Vice Presidents and putting them in her bed.

The car runs out of gas just outside Springfield, leaving the Simpsons to walk the rest of the way in the snow. Upon reaching town, they find Moe hosting a dinner for the old and needy at his tavern. They join the dinner, along with Grampa, having gained a new appreciation of the importance of being with family and friends for the holidays.

Jeanie refunds the Simpsons' money and adds $2,400 in exchange for their promise never to visit the resort again. They buy the smart TV and begin watching Yule Log in HD, ignoring the actual log burning in the fireplace nearby.

== Production ==
In July 2018 at San Diego Comic-Con, Jane Lynch was announced to appear as Jeanie in this episode. Lynch previously appeared as a different character in the twenty-third season episode "Replaceable You."

== Reception ==
Tony Sokol of Den of Geek gave the episode 2 out of 5 points ranking, stating '"'Tis the 30th Season" has a better premise than an execution, not to be confused with a crucifixion. Marge does a good deed in the spirit of the holiday and it costs her the perfect Christmas gift for the kids. It's kind of like the gift of the Maggie without even any Oh Henry bars for Homer. The Simpson family sacrifice personal happiness to the least fortunate, former salesman Gil, the unluckiest man in town, only to see it crassly discarded for a better offer. The casual cynicism sends Marge on an implosive breakdown, which is the best part of the episode, but ultimately gets caught in a chimney.'

Dennis Perkins of The A.V. Club gave the episode C− ranking, stating "The Simpsons makes use of family sitcom plots and its own fluid and comically inventive reality to take those hackneyed plots and bend them into something satirically subversive, while still remaining true to its core of recognizable humanity. Or, you know, it should. "'Tis The 30th Season", however, shows what The Simpsons is like when the inspiration's left out—a blandly pleasant family sitcom with a few lazy surreal touches thrown in.'

"'Tis the 30th Season" scored a 2.8 rating with an 11 share and was watched by 7.53 million people, making The Simpsons Fox's highest rated show of the night.
