= Jomboy (sports media) =

American YouTuber and commentator (born 1989)

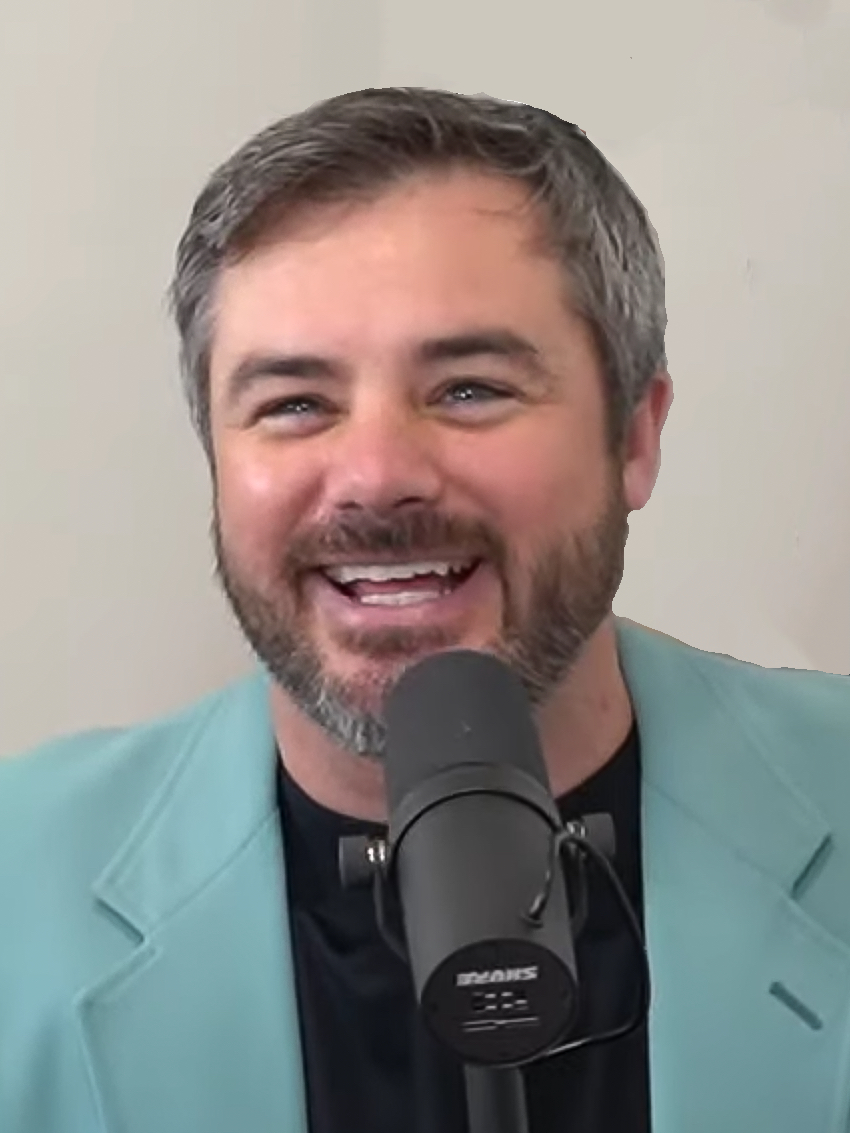
- O'Brien in 2021
- Born: James Vincent Michael O'Brien; February 18, 1989 (age 37); Teaneck, New Jersey, U.S.
- Occupation: Sports media content creator
- Spouse: Kaitlyn O'Brien

YouTube information
- Channel: Jomboy Media
- Years active: 2015–present
- Genres: Sports and entertainment
- Subscribers: 2.20 million
- Views: 1.73 billion
- Last updated: February 27, 2026
- Website: https://jomboymedia.com/ https://jomboyreference.com/

James Vincent Michael O'Brien (born February 18, 1989), better known as Jimmy or by his nickname Jomboy, is an American baseball commentator, podcast host, and internet personality. He co-created the popular New York Yankees podcast Talkin' Yanks in 2017 alongside co-host Jake Storiale and producer David "BBD" Mendelsohn. He rose to wider prominence in 2019 with his viral "breakdown" videos, in which he examines notable sporting events in detail, often aided by his lip reading ability. His commentary is known for its light-hearted and quirky style.

O'Brien is founder of the multimedia company Jomboy Media, which has grown to include YouTube and podcast series such as Talkin' Baseball, The Chris Rose Rotation, Baseball Today, and The Warehouse Games. As of 2022, the company had 64 employees. That year, it signed a contract with the Yankees broadcaster YES Network. In recent seasons, Yankees manager Aaron Boone has regularly appeared on the Talkin' Yanks podcast. It was reported Jomboy Media generated more than $10 million in annual revenue in 2024.

== Early life and career ==
O'Brien was born in Teaneck, New Jersey, and lived in Hazlet, New Jersey, until he was eight years old. He later lived in Lindfield, New South Wales; Lake Zurich, Illinois; Southbury, Connecticut; Livermore, California; Newtown, Connecticut; back to the San Francisco Bay Area; and then Lavallette, New Jersey, before moving to New York City. O'Brien attended Pomperaug High School in Southbury and Central Connecticut State University where he graduated near the middle of his class with a degree in history.

After graduating from college, he worked as a wedding videographer and moonlighted in food delivery while living in the San Francisco Bay Area. In 2015, he created a viral video called "Scaring My Mom With a Fake Dog," showing a repeated prank on his mother, and sold the rights to the video for $4,000. It was at this time he started going by the pseudonym "Jomboy", based on an iPhone's autocorrect of "Jimmy".

== Jomboy Media ==
In 2017, O'Brien created a podcast called Talkin' Yanks with his friend Jake Storiale. The podcast was produced by David Mendelsohn and built a following that led O'Brien to raise money and turn Jomboy Media into a full-time job by the end of 2018.

While watching a July 2019 Yankees game, O'Brien discovered that Aaron Boone's argument with umpire Brennan Miller had been picked up by microphones on an MLB.TV feed, and he published the video of the argument with subtitles showing what was being said. The video went viral and Boone's use of the phrase "savages in the box" became a motto for the Yankees. O'Brien published more "breakdowns" of incidents in MLB and other sports with occasionally profane commentary and gained 300,000 YouTube subscribers after the Boone video. As of April 2026, O'Brien has published more than 78 hours of breakdown content since launching. Yankees and MLB officials expressed mixed reactions to the viral video, with some questioning whether fans should be able to hear conversations on the field and in the dugout and others appreciating O'Brien for making creative content that could market baseball to younger fans. He also started Talkin' Baseball, a baseball podcast in July 2019 with Storiale. The podcast is produced by Mendelsohn and was joined in 2020 by former Major League Baseball player Trevor Plouffe.

In November 2019, O'Brien published a two-minute video appearing to demonstrate how the Astros were stealing signs in the 2017 season as a part of the Houston Astros sign stealing scandal, within hours of the release of an article in The Athletic which detailed the allegations for the first time. In the video, O'Brien showed the scheme playing out in real time in a game against the Chicago White Sox. Whenever catcher Kevan Smith called for pitcher Danny Farquhar to throw a changeup, the sound of someone banging on a trash can in the Astros' dugout was clearly audible. The White Sox were forced to change their signs as a result. O'Brien argued that this sequence proved there was no way the Astros could have gotten the signs without the help of technology. O'Brien published more videos in subsequent days, which garnered millions of views on YouTube, Twitter and other platforms.

In March 2022, Jomboy Media signed a partnership with Yankee-broadcaster YES Network. That year, the company consisted of 64 employees.

In an interview with The New York Times, O'Brien described Jomboy Media's banter as "fun, not funny," and stated, "The easiest way to get laughs sometimes is to knock other people down or go negative. That isn’t really our vibe." This "goofier, more inviting approach" was contrasted to the edginess of fellow sports entertainment company Barstool Sports.

In 2024, Jomboy Media had 93 million social media engagements and 2 million YouTube subscribers.

In March 2025, Jomboy Media appointed Courtney Hirsch, O'Brien's sister, as its new CEO. Hirsch, who also joined Jomboy's board of directors, had played a key role in commercial sales. She had also overseen Jomboy's The Warehouse Games and brand collaborations with Mountain Dew and DirecTV.

In June 2025, MLB bought a minority stake in Jomboy Media. As part of the deal, Jomboy Media will have access to league and team intellectual property, merchandise and sponsorship collaborations, and a presence on league platforms. Under the terms, MLB will have no editorial control over Jomboy content. In the year following the partnership, Jomboy Media saw a 76-percent increase in views.

=== Cricket ===
Jomboy Media has been noted for being a major supporter of cricket's growth in the United States, with cricket content featuring regularly on its YouTube channels, and collaboration having taken place between Jomboy Media and Major League Cricket due to Jomboy Media's ability to reach baseball fans. For example, the Warehouse Games features Ball in Play, a cricket variant with elements of baseball, with professional baseball and cricket players having played it together. During the 2024 Men's T20 World Cup co-hosted by the United States, he would also serve as an on-air contributor.

O'Brien's personal interest in cricket started at the time that he had his first child and had no live sports content to watch other than cricket; his time spent in Australia as a child was also a factor.

== Television ==
In the end credits of "Abe League of Their Moe," the fifteenth episode of the thirty-sixth season of the American animated television series The Simpsons, a Jomboy "breakdown" video of an argument between Grampa Simpson and Moe Szyslak plays, with O'Brien voicing himself.

Year	Title	Role	Notes
2025	The Simpsons	Himself	One Episode: "Abe League of Their Moe"

== Awards and nominations ==
Year	Award	Category	Result	Ref.
2021	11th Streamy Awards	Sports	Nominated	
