= Abe League of Their Moe =

- The Simpsons episode
- Episode no.: Season 36; Episode 15
- Directed by: Rob Oliver
- Written by: Joel H. Cohen
- Production code: 36ABF08
- Original air date: April 27, 2025

Guest appearances
- Kevin Burkhardt as himself; Jamie Demetriou as Aeropos Walkov; Steve Gelbs as reporter; Kevin Millar as himself; Jimmy "Jomboy" O'Brien as himself; Chris Rock as himself; Danny Trejo as himself

Episode chronology
← Previous "Yellow Planet"	Next → "Stew Lies"
- The Simpsons season 36

"Abe League of Their Moe" is the fifteenth episode of the thirty-sixth season of the American animated television series The Simpsons, and the 787th episode overall. It aired in the United States on Fox on April 27, 2025. The episode was written by Joel H. Cohen and directed by Rob Oliver.

In this episode, Grampa and Moe recruit a Macedonian baseball player to play for the Isotopes, but the team and player are corrupted by the money he brings. Jamie Demetriou and Steve Gelbs guest starred. Sportscaster Kevin Burkhardt, former baseball player Kevin Millar, baseball commentator Jomboy, comedian Chris Rock, and actor Danny Trejo appeared as themselves while Jamie Demetriou voices the Macedonian baseball player. Maggie Simpson does not appear in the episode. The episode received positive reviews.

== Plot ==
In 1944, young Abe Simpson is watching a Springfield Isotopes baseball game with his grandfather, who says that Abe will watch a game from the same seats with his grandson.

In the present, Grampa is sitting in the stands watching the Isotopes game and wants Bart to watch with him, but he is not interested. He sees Moe in the stands and bonds with him. Later, they learn that Macedonian two-way player Aeropos Walkov is coming to play in America. Grampa and Moe film a video to get Walkov to play for the Isotopes with Moe speaking in Macedonian. Impressed, Walkov chooses the Isotopes with Moe serving as his translator.

The town redirects funding to renovate the Isotopes' stadium, which is now filled with advertisements. The townsfolk become excited for the team, and Bart goes to Walkov's first game with Grampa. The team performs well with Walkov's pitching and hitting, and Moe benefits from it.

Later, Grampa and Bart are watching the Isotopes on television, but Grampa is annoyed by the in-game commercials.

Attending another game, Grampa and Bart learn that their season ticket seats have been moved to a remote part of the stadium, and the stadium now serves fancy food instead of hot dogs. Grampa complains to Moe, but he is busy helping Walkov. After arguing with Grampa, Moe learns that Walkov is betting on his baseball games because he was tempted by the stadium's advertisements.

Moe asks Grampa for help when Walkov plans to confess his gambling to the press. He refuses because Moe only cares how it would affect him. Grampa finds that Bart is also betting on baseball games. At Walkov's press conference, Walkov confesses to gambling in Macedonian, but Moe says that Walkov is enjoying playing for the team, which confuses the press. Grampa arrives and asks Moe what he thinks of Bart gambling. Feeling guilty, Moe says that Walkov has been gambling. He blames it on the baseball teams and the media networks for profiting from it while they pretend to be offended if a player gambles.

Later, Walkov is cleared of any wrongdoing by the baseball commissioner. The blame is placed on Moe and Walkov leaves to play for another team.

During the end credits, a Jomboy "breakdown" video of an argument between Grampa and Moe plays.

== Production ==
=== Development ===
The premise is based on the gambling case of Ippei Mizuhara, who served as the interpreter of baseball player Shohei Ohtani. Executive producer Matt Selman performed a comedy bit in the writers room pretending to be Mizuhara interpreting Ohtani to hide his gambling. Co-showrunner Michael Price, a New York Mets fan, wanted to comment on legalized gambling as a source of revenue for Major League Baseball. The writers thought Moe could fill the role of the interpreter. Writer Joel H. Cohen conceived that Moe was Macedonian so that he could convince a Macedonian baseball player to play for the Springfield Isotopes. The writers also decided to break canon by making the Isotopes a major league team despite previously being a minor league team. As the first baseball-themed episode since the twenty-second season episode "MoneyBart", the writers attempted to include a joke for each major league team.

The producers asked artists from the Macedonian animated series Darko Biberko to provide Macedonian knowledge for the episode. Music producer Nevena Neskoska helped with Macedonian translation and sang in the episode.

=== Casting ===
Jamie Demetriou guest starred as Aeropos Walkov, and sportscaster Steve Gelbs guest starred as a reporter. Sportscaster Kevin Burkhardt, former baseball player Kevin Millar, comedian Chris Rock, and actor Danny Trejo appeared as themselves. Baseball commentator Jomboy performs a voiceover during the end credits. Baseball reporter Tyler Kepner appears but only gasps while reporter Anthony DiComo makes a non-speaking appearance. Other media members who are Simpsons fans were also animated in the episode.

== Cultural references ==
The title of the episode is a reference to the 1992 film A League of Their Own.

== Reception ==
=== Viewing figures ===
The episode earned a 0.16 rating and was watched by 0.73 million viewers, which was the most-watched show on Fox that night.

=== Critical response ===
John Schwarz of Bubbleblabber gave the episode a 9.5 out of 10. He liked the Grampa and Moe dynamic and liked the jokes. He also thought the satire of baseball was “sadly needed”. Mike Celestino of Laughing Place also liked the jokes and the pairing of Moe and Grampa. However, he thought the plot was “meandering”. Marisa Roffman of Give Me My Remote liked baseball-themed Simpsons episodes and wanted to rewatch the episode because she missed the jokes from the stadium advertisements.

Brandon Zachary of Screen Rant highlighted the couple's relationship, saying, "It's a surprisingly effective pairing that the show hasn't explored too often." Nick Valdez of Comicbook.com ranked the episode tenth on his list of all the episodes of the season. He said it was the best episode focusing on Gramps's past, commenting, "It's such a good idea that it's surprising it took this long to make, but the episode itself strays from the main topic to focus on an international player that Moe and Abe bring to Springfield. It doesn't end as well as it begins, but it's still very entertaining."

=== Awards and nominations ===
Hank Azaria was nominated for the Primetime Emmy Award for Outstanding Character Voice-Over Performance at the 77th Primetime Creative Arts Emmy Awards for his role in this episode as Moe Szyslak. Writer Joel H. Cohen was nominated for the Writers Guild of America Award for Television: Animation at the 78th Writers Guild of America Awards for his script for this episode.
