= Fan-ily Feud =

- The Simpsons episode
- Episode no.: Season 34; Episode 18
- Directed by: Timothy Bailey
- Written by: Broti Gupta
- Production code: OABF11
- Original air date: April 23, 2023

Guest appearances
- Billy Eichner as Billy; Jade Novah as Ashlee Starling and Echo

Episode chronology
← Previous "Pin Gal"	Next → "Write Off This Episode"
- The Simpsons season 34

"Fan-ily Feud" is the eighteenth episode of the thirty-fourth season of the American animated television series The Simpsons, and the 746th episode overall. It aired in the United States on Fox on April 23, 2023. The episode was directed by Timothy Bailey and written by Broti Gupta.

In this episode, Homer insults a musician and her fans, which leads to her fans seeking revenge. Billy Eichner and Jade Novah guest starred. The episode received mixed reviews.

== Plot ==
Homer and Bart go to a baseball game to watch a pitcher break the record for most batters knocked unconscious by a pitch. They wonder why the stands are filled with girls. The stadium video screen starts playing Ashlee Starling's song "Glitter." Bart makes an insulting comment about Starling and her fans to Homer. The girls perform a card stunt, which blocks Homer and Bart's view of the game, and they miss seeing the record. Homer is interviewed by Kent Brockman about Starling. He repeats Bart's insult to Brockman, but Bart praises Starling and her fans to Brockman. Bart warns Homer that he is now in danger.

Later, Homer is driving, and "Glitter" is playing on the car radio on every station. Homer crashes after a large Starling doll is thrown onto the windshield, and glitter comes out of the airbag. At the power plant, Lenny and Carl are wearing Starling fan shirts to avoid being associated with Homer. Bart tells Homer to apologize, but he refuses. Lisa is revealed to be a Starling fan, and Bart wants to join in order to prank Homer. Confined to his home, Homer is kidnapped by Echo, a singer and Starling's rival. Echo says that her fans will protect Homer. When Starling's fan's attacks begin to fail, the town becomes a war zone between Starling's and Echo's fans.

In an interview with Brockman, Marge says she enjoys Starling's music. Starling invites Marge to dinner, which makes Lisa jealous. At dinner, Marge tells Starling about her life with Homer. The next day, Starling releases a song about Homer and Marge's past relationship difficulties. At the same time, Homer learns that Lisa and Bart were attacking him, and Marge, Bart and Lisa start arguing with each other, only to be stopped by a furious and heartbroken Homer, who angrily calls them out for betraying him and leaves. Homer goes to Echo, and they release a song showing how Homer loves his family. Touched and finally realizing how much they hurt Homer and each other, Marge, Bart and Lisa apologize to Homer for betraying him and the family reconciled.

Starling's fans later visit the Simpson home to tell Homer that they have decided to stop attacking him because of his terrible song.

== Production ==
Musician Jade Novah guest starred as both Ashlee Starling and Echo. Billy Eichner reprised his role as Billy. He previously appeared in this role in the thirtieth season episode "Krusty the Clown."

== Cultural references ==
Ashlee Starling's music video about Homer and Marge is a retelling of the story from the second season episode "The Way We Was" while also parodying All Too Well: The Short Film by musician Taylor Swift. Homer's song, "The Meltdown," which he wrote with Echo, is a parody of Beyoncé's album Lemonade. The episode's title is a play on the game show, Family Feud.

== Reception ==
=== Viewing figures ===
The episode earned a 0.28 rating and was watched by 1.00 million viewers, which was the most watched show on Fox that night.

=== Critical response ===
Tony Sokol of Den of Geek gave the episode 4 out of 5 stars. He highlighted the commentary on celebrity fan behavior and Novah's performance as Echo. He thought the music videos effectively turned the series' history into revenge songs. He also liked the final joke comparing celebrity fans with church-goers.

John Schwarz of Bubbleblabber gave the episode a 7.5 out of 10. He questioned why Novah was able to play a white character given that white actors were no longer allowed to portray non-white characters. He thought the episode was ironic since the show's producers made the actor changes due to external social pressure.
