= The Man in the Blue Flannel Pants =

- The Simpsons episode
- Episode no.: Season 23; Episode 7
- Directed by: Steven Dean Moore
- Written by: Jeff Westbrook
- Production code: PABF01
- Original air date: November 27, 2011

Guest appearances
- Kevin Michael Richardson as a party person; John Slattery as Robert Marlowe; Matthew Weiner as Businessman

Episode chronology
← Previous "The Book Job"	Next → "The Ten-Per-Cent Solution"
- The Simpsons season 23

"The Man in the Blue Flannel Pants" is the seventh episode of the twenty-third season of the American animated television series The Simpsons. It first aired on the Fox network in the United States on November 27, 2011, and was seen by around 5.6 million people during this broadcast. In the episode, Homer becomes an account manager for Mr. Burns after successfully hosting a viral marketing event for Krusty the Clown. Meanwhile, Lisa is teaching Bart how to read classic novels like Little Women. Homer's new job affects his family as he becomes more distant and in the end he has to choose between his family or his new job. The episode's title references The Man in the Gray Flannel Suit.

The episode was written by Jeff Westbrook and directed by Steven Dean Moore. It functions mainly as a parody of the television show Mad Men, and features the guest voices of Mad Men actor John Slattery and creator Matthew Weiner. Critics found the episode to be average in quality, receiving criticism for the wasted opportunities with the Mad Men parody.

== Plot ==
Krusty the Clown is about to perform a stunt when his agents mention that there is trouble with Krusty's own brand of vodka, Absolut Krusty. To make it popular, the agents insist that Krusty hold a tastemaker party at the home of a Springfield trendsetter. At the party, the adults are having a fantastic time until Mr. Burns arrives and frightens the guests. Homer ends up saving the party by singing karaoke with Burns. Based on the party's success, Burns promotes Homer to "Accounts Man" for the Springfield Nuclear Plant.

Robert Marlow, a seasoned account veteran, takes Homer under his wing and shows Homer what the high life is like in the corner office. The job changes Homer into a sad individual, who drinks in the dark and complains about the meaninglessness of his job. When Homer's long hours at the office become the norm and Homer becomes distant from his family, a family vacation with Marge and the children help him realize that family always comes before work. Meanwhile, Lisa introduces Bart to a new literary world, which sparks his interest in reading classic novels. In the beginning, Bart struggles with reading and suggests that he should just get a job where he does not have to read. Lisa insists and Bart eventually learns to read properly. When the bullies watch him reading a classic novel at school, they force him to read Little Women to them.

Meanwhile, both Marge and Burns want Homer to go on the same rafting trip. Homer starts with being on his family's raft, and then swims back and forth between that and Burns' raft. Marge discovers that he has double-booked the weekend while both rafts float near a waterfall, and is upset that he chose to do work on a family outing. Homer can only save one raft, and he saves the one containing his family. As Burns and the nuclear regulators are about to go over the waterfall, Marlow rides up on a jetski and carries Burns to safety, while the regulators fall over the edge. Though he is annoyed at the incident, for cutting expenses by six percent, Burns calls it even with Homer, who then decides to spend the rest of the trip with his family, but trips and goes over the waterfall by himself, though he is completely unharmed and finds gold. Later, at their house, Homer tells Marge that he is a safety inspector again. Fireworks go off outside, and it is revealed that they were caused by a fire at the Springfield Nuclear Power Plant, presumably because Homer failed at his job.

== Production ==
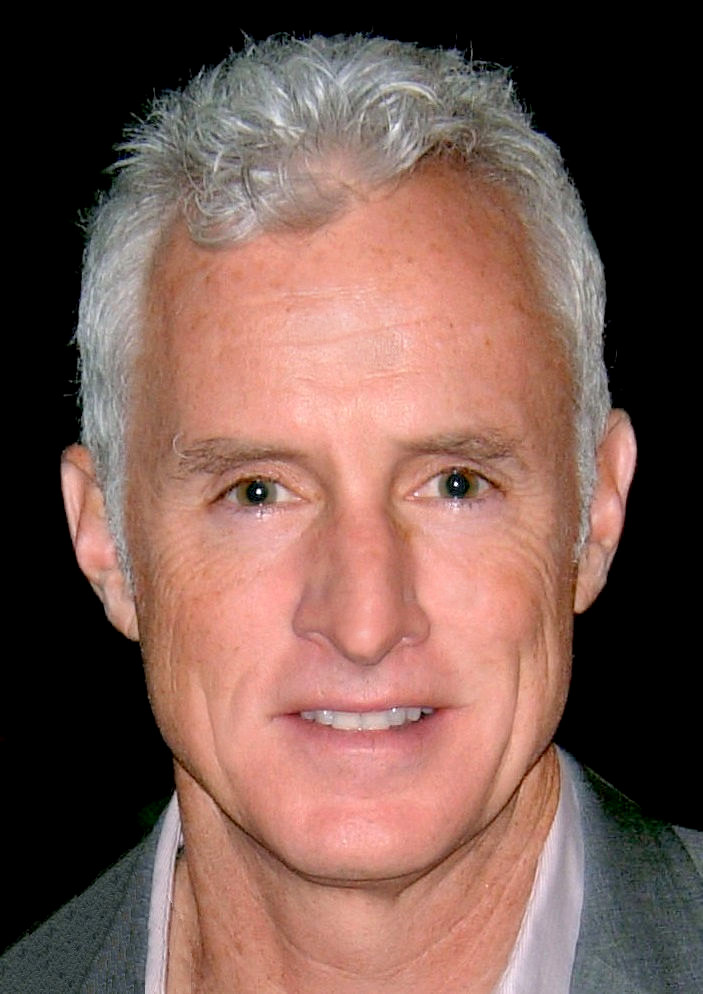
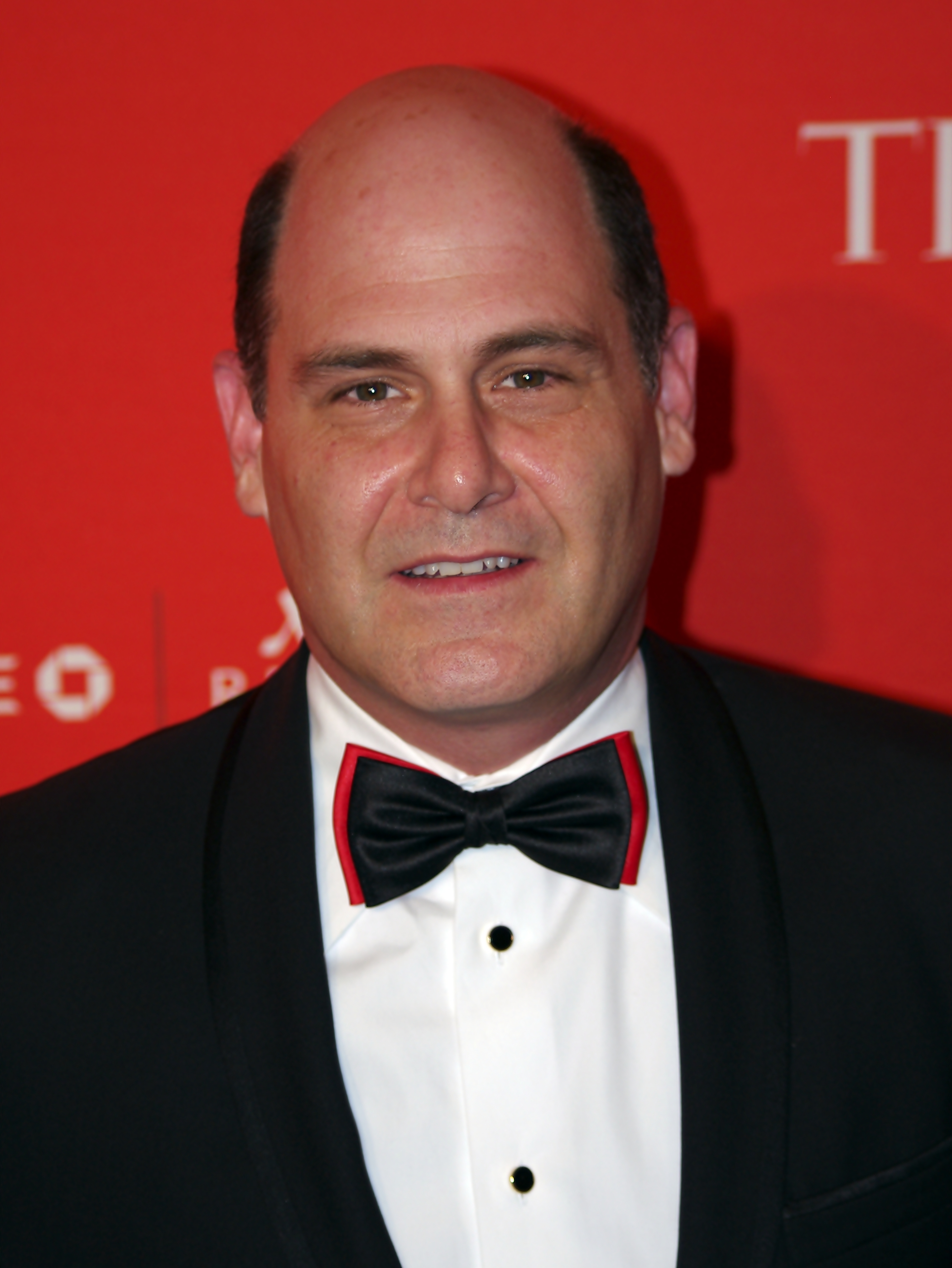
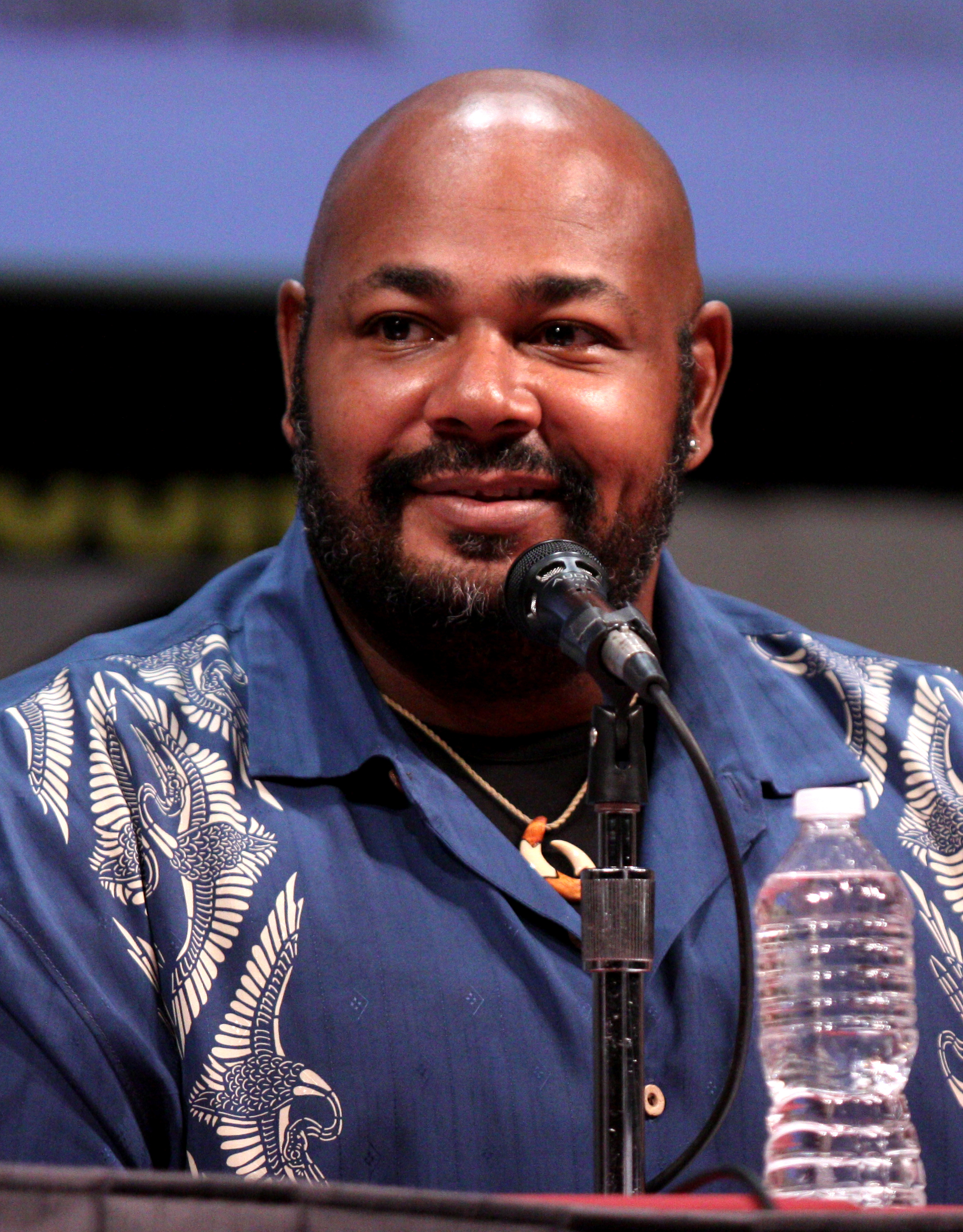
John Slattery, Matthew Weiner, and Kevin Michael Richardson (left to right) featured as guest voices.

"The Man in the Blue Flannel Pants" was written by Jeff Westbrook and directed by Steven Dean Moore. It featured John Slattery, Matthew Weiner, and Kevin Michael Richardson as guest voices. Weiner is the creator, writer, and showrunner of the television show Mad Men, in which Slattery portrays the character Roger Sterling. The entire A-Plot of the episode was a parody of Mad Men. Homer transforms into the lead character from Mad Men, Don Draper, and Slattery's character Robert Marlowe shares similarities with Roger Sterling. Weiner's role in the episode was a brief cameo as one of the businessmen on the rafting trip with Mr. Burns. The lead actor of Mad Men, Jon Hamm, did not appear in the episode, but previously appeared in the season 22 episode "Donnie Fatso" as a different character. "The Man in the Blue Flannel Pants" even recreated a scene from Mad Men, in which a lawnmower runs loose in an office. In an interview with IGN in 2011, the showrunner of the episode, Al Jean, named Mad Men as one of the two television shows he always makes time to watch.

The music in the episode was edited by Chris Ledesma. In his own blog, he explains that this episode required very little musical scoring. In some cases, the musical score is used to take away focus from the scenes that did not work as well as planned. If the episode on the other side is well-scripted and features strong performances from the voice cast, then the music becomes a distraction. Ledesma thought that the "episode offers a nice balance of dialogue and music." Of the music that was used, the theme from the 1965 film Moment to Moment, which was scored by Henry Mancini, was featured during the montage of Homer working at his new job. The episode ends with a piece of music, which is the music composer Alf Clausen's version of the Mancini theme. In total five minutes of music was used for the episode.

The episode featured several references to the character Mr. Burns's old age. When Burns is requesting a song from the discjockey, he asks for "anything by Prince... Wilhelm, of Prussia?". Prince Wilhelm of Prussia was second in line to the German throne and lived from 1906 to 1940. Instead, the discjockey plays "Come Josephine in My Flying Machine" from 1910. Other Mr. Burns quotes include "How ironic. I survived the Titanic by making a raft out of steerage passengers... and now this." and the RMS Titanic sank in 1912.

== Release ==
The episode originally aired on the Fox network in the United States on November 27, 2011. It was watched by approximately 5.61 million people during this broadcast. The show received a 2.6 Nielsen rating in the demographic for adults aged 18–49, which was a 4% drop from the previous episode "The Book Job", and a six percent audience share. It was preceded by The Cleveland Show and became the highest-rated program in Fox's Animation Domination lineup that night in terms of total viewers, finishing higher than Family Guy (5.50 million), American Dad! (4.48 million), The Cleveland Show (3.67 million), and Allen Gregory (3.18 million). The episode did, however, not rate higher than Family Guy in the 18–49 demographic. Seven days after the initial airing, the episode had a 19.2% increase in the 18–49 demographics from DVR viewings, raising the overall ratings to 3.1. The overall viewership increased with 15.7% to 6.49 million viewers. For the week of November 21–27, 2011, "The Man in the Blue Flannel Pants" finished in 21st place in the ratings among all network prime-time broadcasts in the 18–49 demographic.

Since airing, "The Man in the Blue Flannel Pants" has been generally received as being average in quality by television critics. The A.V. Club's Hayden Childs gave the episode an overall rating of B− and found that the episode "wasn’t particularly funny but neither was it particularly bad." He praised the episode for "a strong storyline" and "elements that often crop up in the better episodes, like a focus that does not stray too far from the Simpson family and a B-plot that works". Despite this, he felt that the "jokes are so low-key and mild that the episode zooms by without raising a single chuckle or smirk." Similarly, Jason Hughes of AOL TV commented that "[w]hile it was a charming enough episode, there were no stand-out moments of clever satire or unexpected twists." Ology's Josh Harrison was slightly more negative and thought the episode was "charming but a bit of a comic flop". He concluded that the episode was nothing special and gave the episode a rating of six out of ten.

On the Mad Men parody, Childs found comedic potential in Homer's transformation into Don Draper, but concluded that this was "where the episode could have gotten very funny very fast, but it doesn’t bring any of these jokes home." He further elaborated that "Don Draper is a sad character, true, but there is some real comic potential in his pretensions and vanity. The writers are tapping into this aspect of his characterization to a small degree, but they aren’t really satirizing it." Hughes was not impressed with the Mad Men parody and sarcastically stated that the spoof was "so sharp, you'll swear it's 2008".
