= Full Heart, Empty Pool =

- The Simpsons episode
- Episode no.: Season 36; Episode 17
- Directed by: Chris Clements
- Written by: Jeff Westbrook
- Production code: 36ABF10
- Original air date: May 11, 2025

Guest appearances
- Blake Griffin as himself; Andrew Luck as himself; Megan Rapinoe as herself; Robert Smigel as Razelton; Rick Steves as himself

Episode chronology
← Previous "Stew Lies"	Next → "Estranger Things"
- The Simpsons season 36

"Full Heart, Empty Pool" is the seventeenth episode of the thirty-sixth season of the American animated television series The Simpsons, and the 789th episode overall. It aired in the United States on Fox on May 11, 2025. The episode was written by Jeff Westbrook and directed by Chris Clements.

In this episode, Homer and Grampa invent a sport, but Homer is forced to cut out Grampa to ensure its popularity. Robert Smigel as guest starred as Razelton. Former basketball player Blake Griffin, former football player Andrew Luck, former soccer player Megan Rapinoe, and travel writer Rick Steves appeared as themselves.

== Plot ==
Squeaky-Voiced Teen is subpoenaed to testify in court that, as part of his job, he rented a backhoe to Homer. He wanted to build a swimming pool in his backyard but accidentally severed the town's utility lines. Homer uses Teen's testimony to prove that he is incompetent and gets compensation from Teen's employer. He uses it to buy pool noodles and balls. Marge is worried about Homer's legacy, which leads him to think he will not be remembered. Depressed, he sits in the unfinished pool while hitting a ball against the walls with a folded pool noodle. Grampa comforts him, and they create a game with the noodles and ball. They call it Noodleball. They invite the seniors at the retirement home to play and hope it will be their legacy.

The game becomes popular with senior citizens, who play in empty pools in town. However, they lose access to the pools to children who want to swim and to teenagers who skateboard in them. Trying to save their legacy, they meet Gabriel Razelton, who represents a consortium that wants to support Noodleball. He unveils a model of a Noodleball stadium complex sponsored by the avocado industry. However, he tells Homer that he wants to cut out Grampa, so he can market Noodleball as a sport for the wealthy instead of seniors. Homer accepts to ensure his legacy.

The stadium complex opens with a celebrity tournament featuring retired athletes. Marge forces Homer to tell Grampa that he was cut out. Grampa says legacy is meaningless since the dead will not know. Lisa argues that growing avocados wastes natural resources, and the industry is using Noodleball to improve its reputation. Feeling guilty, Homer wants to play in the tournament with Grampa. As the match starts, Homer and Grampa are immediately injured, ruining the sport and its sponsor, but Marge is proud that Homer reconciled with Grampa.

== Production ==
Robert Smigel as guest starred as Razelton. Former basketball player Blake Griffin, former football player Andrew Luck, former soccer player Megan Rapinoe, and travel writer Rick Steves appeared as themselves.

The episode was dedicated in memory of musician Jill Sobule, who performed in the thirty-first season episode "Marge the Lumberjill".

== Cultural references ==
This episode contains several references to the film Challengers, including the electronic music that resembles the soundtrack to the film composed by Trent Reznor and Atticus Ross, the usage of the song S&M by Rihanna and the scene of Agnes Skinner, Old Jewish Man and Jasper engaging in a tryst.

== Reception ==
=== Viewing figures ===
The episode earned a 0.17 rating and was watched by 0.69 million viewers, which was the second-most watched show on Fox that night.

=== Critical response ===
John Schwarz of Bubbleblabber gave the episode a 6 out of 10. He liked the dialogue and the athlete appearances but thought the plot was similar to the 1998 film BASEketball. He was more interested in the subplot of Squeaky-Voiced Teen. Cathal Gunning, a journalist for Screen Rant, notes a confusing inconsistency in the episode's portrayal of Homer as desperate to leave a legacy, even though he describes episode as a "solid, fun outing." Nick Valdez of Comicbook.com ranked the episode seventh on his list of all the episodes of the season. He highlighted the relationship between Grandpa and Homer, commenting, "It's not the most momentous episode or the one with the biggest plot twists of any of the others on this list, but it's just plain fun."
