= Write Off This Episode =

- The Simpsons episode
- Episode no.: Season 34; Episode 19
- Directed by: Matthew Nastuk
- Written by: J. Stewart Burns
- Production code: OABF12
- Original air date: April 30, 2023

Episode chronology
← Previous "Fan-ily Feud"	Next → "The Very Hungry Caterpillars"
- The Simpsons season 34

"Write Off This Episode" is the nineteenth episode of the thirty-fourth season of the American animated television series The Simpsons, and the 747th episode overall. It aired in the United States on Fox on April 30, 2023. The episode was directed by Matthew Nastuk and written by J. Stewart Burns.

In this episode, Marge and Lisa create a charity to clean the clothes of the homeless, but Marge begins to change its purpose. Maggie Simpson does not appear in this episode. The episode received mixed reviews.

== Plot ==
At home, Homer wins an online bet on a football game. As he celebrates, his wedding ring drops under the floorboards. In the crawlspace under the house, he is sprayed by skunks. Marge cleans Homer with a hose, and she cleans his clothes by shaking them in a pillow case with a few other ingredients. Lisa wants to use this method to help the homeless. They begin passing out pillow cases with the ingredients to the unhoused. The Rich Texan sees them and wants to donate money to them. Because they are not a charity, the Rich Texan helps Marge and Lisa set one up.

When they run out of baking soda for the pillow cases, Lisa leaves to find baking soda from an ethical source. Without Lisa, Marge continues the work alone. Bernice Hibbert sees Marge and offers to give Marge an office and sponsors to increase publicity for the charity, and Marge accepts. She begins to accept donations from questionable people such as Mr. Burns. When Lisa returns, she is shocked to see what the charity has become.

As Marge and Lisa argue over the purpose of the charity, Marge decides to remove Lisa from having any control. Homer helps Lisa forgive Marge, and Lisa decides to support her. At the gala for the opening of the charity's headquarters, Marge sees what the charity has become. She announces that she is giving full control of the charity to Lisa. Lisa immediately turns the headquarters into a homeless shelter, which horrifies the gala attendees who were only donating money to make themselves feel better.

== Production ==
The episode's title, along with the writer, were revealed by Michael Price on August 4, 2022.

== Reception ==
=== Viewing figures ===
The episode earned a 0.25 rating and was watched by 0.89 million viewers, which was the second-most watched show on Fox that night.

=== Critical response ===
John Schwarz of Bubbleblabber gave the episode a 6.5 out of 10. He thought the commentary on charities could have been stronger and that the script could have been better written. He also noticed that Shearer's voice for Mr. Burns was weaker than normal.

Tony Sokol of Den of Geek gave the episode 4 out of 5 stars. He thought the story was told entirely through jokes like in early seasons. He also highlighted the sight gags and thought Harry Shearer's performance as Mr. Burns made him seem fragile.
