= The Book Job =

- The Simpsons episode
- Episode no.: Season 23; Episode 6
- Directed by: Bob Anderson
- Written by: Dan Vebber
- Production code: NABF22
- Original air date: November 20, 2011

Guest appearances
- Neil Gaiman as himself; Andy García as the TweenLit Inc. publisher

Episode chronology
← Previous "The Food Wife"	Next → "The Man in the Blue Flannel Pants"
- The Simpsons season 23

"The Book Job" is the sixth episode of the twenty-third season of the American animated television series The Simpsons. It originally aired on the Fox network in the United States on November 20, 2011. In the episode, Lisa is shocked to discover that all popular young-adult novels are conceived by book publishing executives through use of market research and ghostwriters to make money. Homer decides to get rich by making a fantasy novel about trolls, with help from Bart, Principal Skinner, Patty, Moe, Professor Frink, and author Neil Gaiman. Lisa does not think writing should be about money, and decides to write her own novel.

The episode was written by freelancer Dan Vebber, though The Simpsons executive producer Matt Selman received the idea for it. His inspiration came from a magazine article he had read about the book packaging company Alloy Entertainment and its use of ghostwriters. In addition, the episode was inspired by the Ocean's Trilogy, a film series about a group of criminals that heist casinos, and features many elements from it. Actor Andy García, who appears in that series as a casino owner, guest starred in "The Book Job" as the book publishing executive. It also contains several references to and parodies of the Harry Potter and Twilight series, aimed at young adults. The episode was seen by approximately 5.77 million people during its original airing and since then it has received positive reviews from television critics, particularly for its satire of the book publishing industry and for its references to the Ocean's Trilogy. Gaiman, who provided his voice for the episode, has also been praised for his performance.

== Plot ==
After watching a dinosaur show, Lisa discovers her favorite author, T. R. Francis, working there in a dinosaur costume. The woman is an actress hired by the publishing company to pose as T. R. Francis, who is a fabrication, and says all young-adult book series are conceived by executives through market research and ghostwriters to make money. When Homer learns of this, he decides to get rich by group-writing a fantasy novel with a team consisting of Bart, Principal Skinner, Patty, Moe, and Professor Frink. Horrified that they are group-writing a book for money, Lisa decides to write a novel of her own.

For their novel, the team decides to take elements from popular young-adult series. They write about an orphan troll who goes to a magic school located under the Brooklyn Bridge. Neil Gaiman overhears the team and offers his help, but they limit him to bringing food for them while they write the novel titled The Troll Twins of Underbridge Academy. They take the novel to a publishing executive, who asks for a fake author with an inspirational back story. Meanwhile, Lisa is having difficulty making progress on her book, so she agrees to become the fake author of their novel. The executive buys the novel from the team.

The team receives an advance copy of the novel. They discover the publisher has replaced the troll-aspects of the story with vampires and renamed the novel The Vampire Twins of Transylvania Prep because market testing preferred vampires over trolls. Realizing they care more about their book than the money, the team breaks into the publisher's headquarters to replace the new novel with the original. However, the executive confronts them because Lisa tipped him off since she wants her name on a popular book. The executive allows Lisa to insert his flash drive with the new novel into his computer.

Later, the team passes a bookstore and discovers that The Troll Twins of Underbridge Academy is being put on the stands. Lisa had faked the betrayal to access the executive's computer, and covertly swapped his flash drive with Bart's flash drive that contained the troll novel. However, when Lisa opens a copy of the book, she discovers Gaiman is listed as the author. He had slipped another flash drive with his name onto Lisa's possession with Moe's help. Later, Gaiman and Moe celebrate, but Gaiman has poisoned Moe's drink.

== Production ==
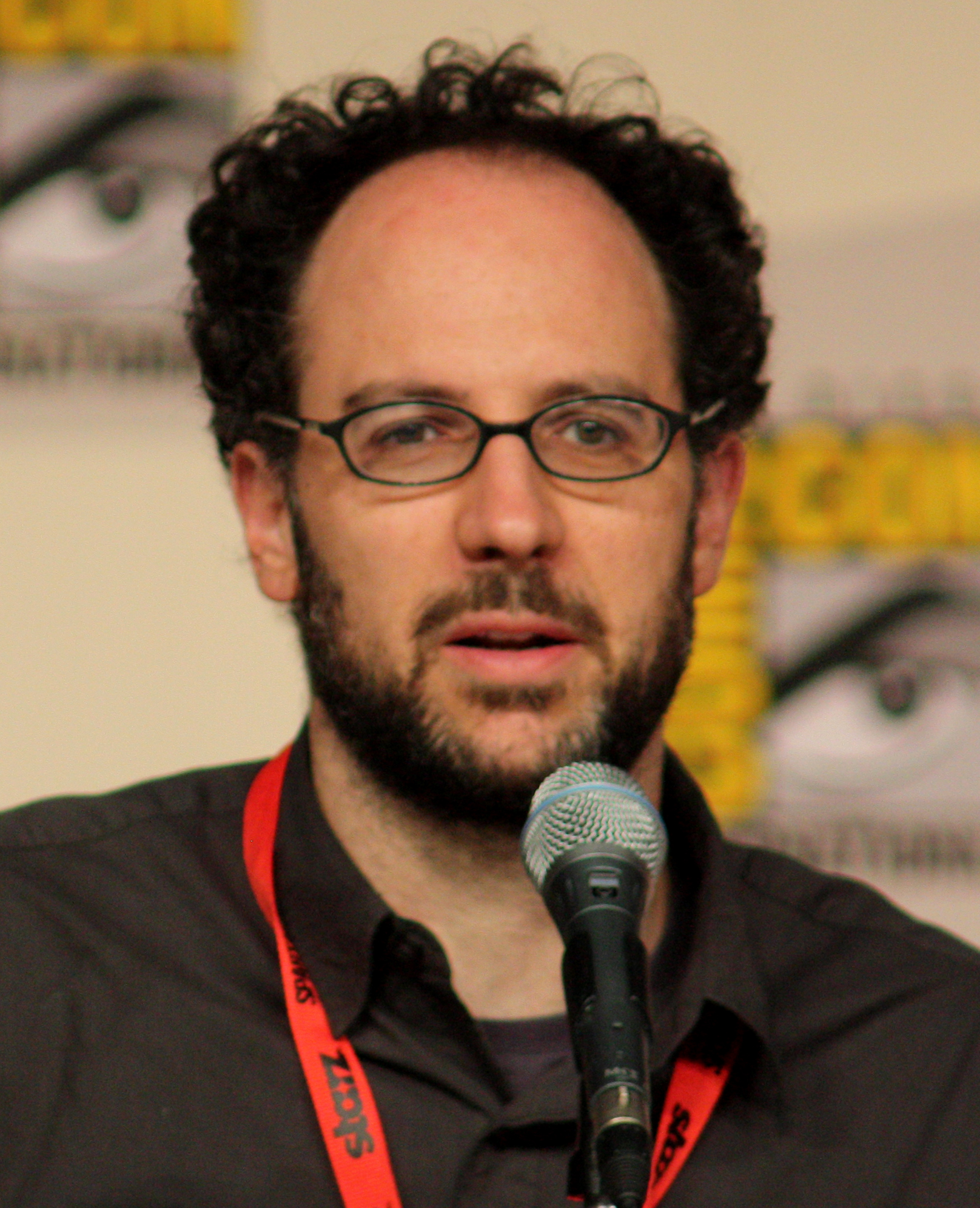
Matt Selman conceived of the idea behind the episode after reading a magazine article about book publishing.

Freelance writer Dan Vebber, who is known for his work on the animated series Futurama, wrote "The Book Job" with contributions from the staff writers on The Simpsons. Matt Selman, an executive producer and writer on The Simpsons, was the one who conceived of the idea behind the episode. He was inspired by an article in The New Yorker about the book packaging company Alloy Entertainment—the publisher of series such as Gossip Girl and Vampire Diaries—and the company's use of ghostwriters. According to Selman, the article "was all about how these executives take market research and come up with the ideas for these books and farms them out and slaps the name of fake writers on them and fabricates backgrounds for these authors who don’t exist. We took that trend and kind of blew it up and shoved it in the face of Lisa".

Selman told the Los Angeles Times that the episode praises collaborative writing, and answers the question of whether or not writing in a group is as valuable as writing alone. He commented: "I've been with The Simpsons for 15 years and everyday [sic] it's been pretty much writing as a team. We’re proud of what we've done even if it's not the traditional idea of one writer sitting down with a passion and a vision. In a strange way this episode ends up as a defense of writing in a group and celebrating the way it makes you feel connected to the work and to the people in that group in ways you didn't expect. It's all about a writers room ... and you know, in the story, Homer's cynical heist team does end up being incredibly productive." The episode features several references to literature and parodies several popular young-adult book series, particularly Twilight, a vampire-themed fantasy book series by Stephenie Meyer that has received much popularity. While chasing T. R. Francis through the stadium where the dinosaur show took place, Lisa passes a bathroom in which a group of dinosaurs are smoking in reference to a Far Side comic of dinosaurs smoking. The dinosaurs even appear the same and are in the same positions as they were in the comic. The dinosaur show itself, Sitting with Dinosaurs, is based on the live Walking with Dinosaurs show.

In addition to literature, the episode spoofs the Ocean's Trilogy, a film series about a group of criminals that heist casinos. Selman revealed to Entertainment Weekly in January 2011 that the episode is essentially about "Homer and some people in Springfield hav[ing] to perpetrate an Ocean's Eleven–style heist in the non-Ocean's Eleven world of children’s fantasy book publishing." Throughout the episode as the story progresses, title cards with titles such as "The Crew", "The Setup", "The Heist", and "The Payday" appear. During these title cards, which last for about three to four seconds each, a version of the song "Gritty Shaker" by David Holmes is heard. This song was played for approximately three minutes during a scene in Ocean's Eleven. On his blog, The Simpsons music editor Chris Ledesma wrote that Selman wanted "Gritty Shaker" to be played repeatedly throughout "The Book Job" because he erroneously thought that was how it was done in film. During the heist of TweenLit Inc.'s headquarters, the screen splits in several ways, showing the different team members making their way to the printing room. According to Selman, "the set-up and feel [of the episode] is a real creative departure for us. It's sort of a heist movie where the heist is writing a book but when that kicks in, there's a giant stylistic leap. It's also a little sillier, a little more stylistic than most episodes. We're coming up on 500 episodes, but really, this is the kind of episode a show would only do if hadn't already had a couple hundred episodes." Cuban American actor Andy García, who appeared in the Ocean's Trilogy as casino owner Terry Benedict, guest starred in "The Book Job" as the book publishing executive. At the end of January 2011, the recording of his performance took place.

English fantasy author Neil Gaiman guest starred in the episode as himself, helping Homer and the others write the book. He recorded his lines in January 2011 in Los Angeles, California under the direction of Selman. Gaiman has said that when he first agreed to guest star, he assumed he would only be getting a brief appearance, popping up for a few seconds. He told the press that "when they actually sent me the script and I started to read it and discovered that I was in it all the way through and was actually having to act and that stuff happened, it was enormously fun." Gaiman also noted that he does not think the episode gives an entirely accurate portrayal of him, commenting: "Truthfully, the real-life me almost never hangs around in Barnes & Noble-like bookstores waiting to find groups of local townsfolk who've decided to write pseudonymous young adult fantasy series, offering my services. And even if I did, I probably wouldn't be doing the catering." On his official Tumblr page, Gaiman noted that while he did not have much input on the story, he got to improvise while recording and gave suggestions on how to make his dialogue sound as close to something he might actually say in real life.

== Reception ==
"The Book Job" originally aired on the Fox network in the United States on November 20, 2011. It was watched by approximately 5.77 million people during this broadcast. In the demographic for adults aged 18–49, the episode received a 2.7 Nielsen rating (down twenty-one percent from the previous episode) and a seven percent share. The Simpsons became the second highest-rated program in Fox's Animation Domination lineup that night in terms of total viewers and in the 18–49 demographic, finishing with a higher rating than Allen Gregory and American Dad!, but a lower rating than Family Guy.

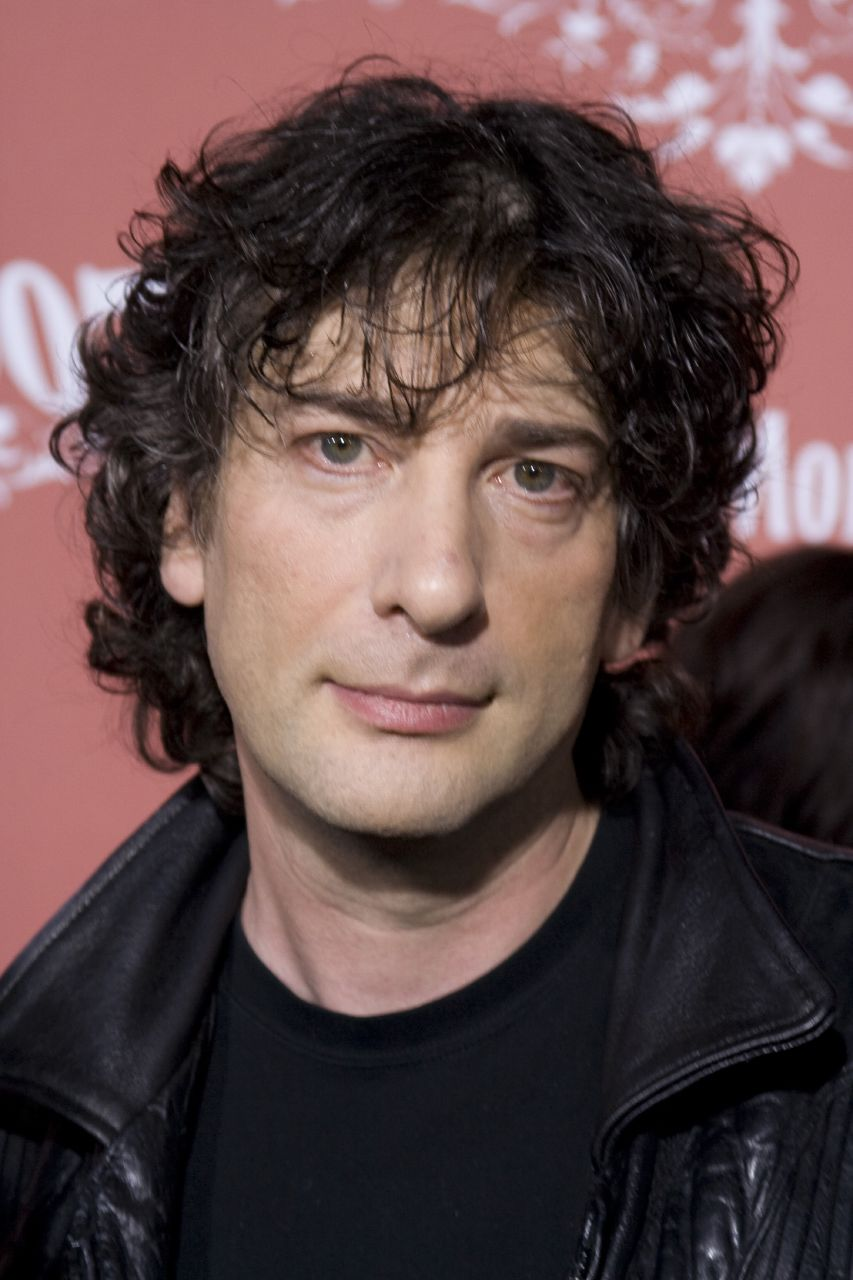
Neil Gaiman was praised for his guest appearance.

Since airing, "The Book Job" has received positive reviews from critics. Josh Harrison of Ology named it one the season's strongest episodes so far, praising it for featuring "a brilliant appearance by author [...] Neil Gaiman and a slick Ocean's Eleven aesthetic". AOL TV's Jason Hughes applauded the uncommon structuring of the episode, writing: "So why was this episode so much more fun than usual? We think it has to do with the format and the playfulness in the presentation. After two decades, it pays to shake things up and give us a completely fresh look at the show. Even the team created some new combinations from the massive Springfield citizenry. Maybe they should consider doing that more often." Hayden Childs of The A.V. Club praised the episode as "entertaining and successful", commenting that "element of surprise is the key here, and The Simpsons did something quite surprising tonight, combining a parody of heist movies with a sharp satirical look at book mill publishing. With the successful guest appearances by both Neil Gaiman and Andy García, this episode delivered an increasingly rare treat for Simpsons fans: a well-written and well-acted half-hour that gets better and funnier as it goes." Childs criticized the "split screens of various heist-style shenanigans" as the "least amusing part of the episode." He noted that while "the rest of the gags have some thrust to them, [these] cross the line into cute pandering to the audience. Fortunately, they are over in about ten seconds."

Michael Cavna of The Washington Post wrote positively about the episode, commenting that from "the one-liners of the episode's dinosaur-show opening (reminding that a prime-time 'fossil' like The Simpsons still has sharp comedic bicuspids) to the final trick up 'Neil Gaiman's' dark sleeve, 'The Book Job' is worthy of the show's DVD wall of fame." Cavna particularly praised the episode for being based on real-life publishing, noting how Selman drew inspiration from the article on Alloy Entertainment. He also commended the parodies of the Ocean's Trilogy and Far Side, and Gaiman's guest appearance. Cavna wrote that "Gaiman's role is so much more than mere walk-on. Like the show's very best guest voice performances, here Gaiman is called upon to lend true dimension to the episode." Similarly, Cyriaque Lamar of io9 wrote that the episode "did justice to Gaiman's guest appearance...in that it made the author look like a total nutcase." He added that "Gaiman gamely depicts himself as a goony spaniel. Sure, Andy García guest-starred too, but Gaiman stole the show." In addition, Lamar praised the episode for several of its gags, including the Far Side reference and the disclosures of Patty being able to speak fluent Dothraki and Twilight originally revolving around golems.
