= Pin Gal =

- The Simpsons episode
- Episode no.: Season 34; Episode 17
- Directed by: Chris Clements
- Written by: Jeff Westbrook
- Production code: OABF10
- Original air date: March 19, 2023

Guest appearances
- Fred Armisen as Terrence; Albert Brooks as Jacques

Episode features
- Couch gag: Dolls of the Simpson family are placed on the couch. A dog grabs the Homer doll with its mouth and chews it.

Episode chronology
| ← Previous "Hostile Kirk Place" | Next → "Fan-ily Feud" |
- The Simpsons season 34

"Pin Gal" is the seventeenth episode of the thirty-fourth season of the American animated television series The Simpsons, and the 745th episode overall. It aired in the United States on Fox on March 19, 2023. The episode was directed by Chris Clements and written by Jeff Westbrook.

In this episode, Marge must win a bowling match to save the town's bowling alley but encounters someone from her past. Guest stars Albert Brooks and Fred Armisen reprise their previous roles. The episode received positive reviews.

== Plot ==
Homer learns that Barney's Bowlarama is permanently closing. Homer and his bowling teammates attempt to convince the owner not to sell, but he has already sold it to Terrence, who likes the aesthetic. He plans to close the bowling alley and turn it into a place for hipsters. Homer asks for one week to show that the townspeople enjoy bowling. Terrence agrees, but Homer is unsuccessful. Later, Homer and Marge go bowling where he and Terrence see that Marge bowls well. Terrence offers to keep the bowling alley open if Marge can defeat a bowler of Terrence's choosing, and Marge accepts.

While practicing, Marge notices a photo of Jacques on the wall and begins to bowl poorly. Homer decides to bring Jacques to coach her. Jacques tells Marge that he would train her and not attempt to restart their previous romantic encounter. (Note: As depicted in the 1990 episode "Life on the Fast Lane") However, Jacques continues to tempt Marge. Grampa notices Jacques' and Marge's interactions.

Grampa shows Jacques' social media posts to Homer, which show Jacques' encounters with other female bowlers. Homer goes to Jacques' apartment, which is covered with photos of Marge. He and Jacques fight until Marge arrives and confesses her previous encounter. Homer forgives Marge, and they leave. At the bowling match, Terrence selects Jacques as Marge's opponent. Marge wins a close match, and Jacques is deported for an expired visa. Terrence agrees to keep the bowling alley open but only with one lane available in order to artificially create a lengthy waiting period.

== Production ==
Albert Brooks reprised his role as Jacques. Brooks previously appeared in this role in the first season episode "Life on the Fast Lane." Brooks has guest starred as several different characters over the course of the series. As usual, he was credited as "A. Brooks." Fred Armisen reprised his role as Terrence. Armisen first appeared in this role in the twenty-fourth season episode "The Day the Earth Stood Cool."

Viewers noticed a continuity error because Marge previously told Homer about Jacques' interest in Marge in the sixth season episode "Another Simpsons Clip Show." However, executive producer Al Jean stated that clip show episodes were non-canon.

In addition, the cigarette machine in Moe's Tavern, which had appeared since the beginning of the series, was permanently removed. Jean stated that a replacement object would appear in future episodes.

== Reception ==
=== Viewing figures ===
The episode earned a 0.23 rating and was watched by 0.86 million viewers, which was the most watched show on Fox that night.

=== Critical response ===
Tony Sokol of Den of Geek gave the episode 4.5 out of 5 stars. He thought the whole episode was "entertaining." He highlighted the background jokes featuring Hans Moleman and Fat Tony. He also praised the performance by Albert Brooks.

John Schwarz of Bubbleblabber gave the episode an 8 out of 10. He highlighted the flashback scenes and the performances by Brooks and Armisen. He also thought that the impact of Jacques on Homer and Marge's relationship was not as effective after the many episodes featuring Homer and Marge being romantically tempted since Jacques first appeared.
