= Homer's Adventures Through the Windshield Glass =

- The Simpsons episode
- Promotional artwork for the episode, showcasing Lizzo sitting next to the Simpsons on their couch.
- Episode no.: Season 34; Episode 22
- Directed by: Bob Anderson
- Written by: Tim Long
- Production code: OABF13
- Original air date: May 21, 2023

Guest appearances
- Lizzo as Goobie Woo and herself; Tim Robinson as Mercer; James Sie as Pol Pot; Bowen Yang as Richard

Episode features
- Chalkboard gag: "I will not try to cram 750 characters into the opening credits..."
- Couch gag: The Simpsons run in and sit on the couch in a room full of random characters. Homer asks his family "Who the hell are these people?"

Episode chronology
← Previous "Clown V. Board of Education"	Next → "Homer's Crossing"
- The Simpsons season 34

"Homer's Adventures Through the Windshield Glass" is the twenty-second and final episode of the thirty-fourth season of the American animated television series The Simpsons, and the 750th episode overall. It aired in the United States on Fox on May 21, 2023. In this episode, Homer, angered after discovering Marge's secret, crashes his car into a fire hydrant and is thrown from the windshield where he reflects on how he got into this situation. Musician Lizzo guest starred as Goobie Woo and herself. Tim Robinson and Bowen Yang also guest starred. The episode received positive reviews.

The episode was directed by Bob Anderson and written by Tim Long.

As this is the 750th episode of The Simpsons, 750 characters from the series were included in the opening sequence.

== Plot ==
As an angry Homer leaves the bank and texts Marge while driving, he crashes his car into a fire hydrant and is thrown from the windshield. Time slows down, and Maggie's elf doll, Goobie Woo, asks how Homer got there. He recounts that he was at the bank to open a safe deposit box for a potato chip. He was angered when he discovered that Marge had secretly kept a safe deposit box, which contains her late father Clancy's will, where she would receive $1,000 per month. Goobie Woo says that Bart and Lisa are aware of the money, which further angers Homer, who speculates that Marge uses it to indulge herself. Instead, Goobie Woo reveals that Marge uses the money to help Homer when he gets in trouble. She also shows Homer that Clancy left Marge the money because he did not trust Homer to provide for her. He asks why he could see Clancy, and she says it is because Homer has died.

Homer goes to hell, where he is forced to stand in line and wait to be boiled in blood. While waiting, he spots Clancy, who shows him a future where Lisa brings home a terrible boyfriend, and Homer realizes it is the same way Clancy felt about him. The revelation allows Homer to return to Earth and survive the crash. The family arrives with Maggie picking up Goobie Woo as Homer is loaded into the ambulance; Marge uses some money to give him some painkillers.

In the recording session for the episode, Lizzo is told to slap Homer. She refuses and starts to play a flute/saxophone duet rendition of the show's opening theme with Lisa, while Bart slaps Homer to keep time.

== Production ==
The producers had long wanted to have an episode that takes place in a few seconds. The issue was figuring out who Homer would talk with in that short period. They settled on a spirit guide in the form of a doll in the car. The episode took inspiration from An Occurrence at Owl Creek Bridge and The Secret Miracle, whose stories play with time.

When the producers heard Lizzo was a fan, they reached out to offer her the role of the doll, and she accepted. Writer and executive producer Tim Long wrote lyrics to a song, with a melody written by Bret McKenzie, for Lizzo's character to sing. In addition, the producers decided to have a scene of Lizzo as herself performing the recording session to voice the doll. The producers were impressed by Lizzo's knowledge of the history of The Simpsons, including referring to Lisa's saxophone as "saxamaphone". The producers also included Lizzo's flute, Sasha Flute, in the episode as the doll's flute. Lizzo also added a line to the joke where gay people in hell were being upgraded to heaven due to the changing views of society.

In honor of the 750th episode of the show, 750 characters appeared in the opening sequence. Bowen Yang appeared as Richard, and Tim Robinson appeared as Mercer.

== Reception ==
=== Viewing figures ===
The episode earned a 0.2 rating with 0.87 million viewers, which was the most viewed show on Fox that night.

=== Critical response ===
Tony Sokol of Den of Geek gave the episode a 3.5 out of 5 stars stating "The concept of the episode is extremely far reaching, the plot has a strong promise, but skims when it should dive. The funniest part of the episode is the closing credits, which is sadly, very often the case. Lisa may seem cruel and indifferent to Homer's woes, but the line about teaching Bart decimal points is classic Simpsons."

John Schwarz of Bubbleblabber gave the episode an 8/10 stating: "The Simpsons gives us an almost-cliched dream episode, but because its a near-death experience, I welcomed the more visceral premise. Sure, we got a few more tiny cliches like various glimpses into the future, but 'Homer Goes To Hell' is as good as a pitch that I've heard in a while. I understand that we kind of got some of this in 'Treehouse of Horror IV' with Ned in the role of Satan, and I must admit we didn't get a revisit from that iconic character, but there were a ton of other background gags that had me laughing like nuts, not unlike an episode of Superjail! in terms of the variety and execution."

=== Awards and nominations ===
Writer Tim Long was nominated for the Writers Guild of America Award for Television: Animation at the 76th Writers Guild of America Awards for this episode.
