= The Very Hungry Caterpillars =

- The Simpsons episode
- Episode no.: Season 34; Episode 20
- Directed by: Gabriel DeFrancesco
- Written by: Brian Kelley
- Production code: OABF14
- Original air date: May 7, 2023

Guest appearance
- Rob Lowe as Cousin Peter

Episode chronology
← Previous "Write Off This Episode"	Next → "Clown V. Board of Education"
- The Simpsons season 34

"The Very Hungry Caterpillars" is the twentieth episode of the thirty-fourth season of the American animated television series The Simpsons, and the 748th episode overall. It aired in the United States on Fox on May 7, 2023. The episode was directed by Gabriel DeFrancesco and written by Brian Kelley.

In this episode, the Simpson family copes with being at home after a caterpillar invasion forces a lockdown. Rob Lowe guest starred as Principal Skinner's cousin Peter. The episode received positive reviews.

== Plot ==
At the breakfast table, Maggie is going through a phase where she refuses to eat food without ranch dressing. Suddenly, an emergency announcement states that the town has been overrun with caterpillars, and the town must enter a lockdown until the caterpillars leave. The children begin remote learning with Principal Skinner. At the end of the school day, Skinner accidentally leaves his camera operating, which allows Bart to watch him. Skinner is at home with his mother, Agnes, and his cousin Peter, who is staying with them. He sees that Agnes favors Peter over Skinner. Meanwhile, the family runs out of ranch dressing, and Marge tells Homer to ask Ned Flanders for more. After Homer insults Flanders, he returns with only a small cup of dressing. Lisa learns that the lockdown could last for months.

To relieve Lisa's anxiety, Homer gives Lisa her Christmas present, a Malibu Stacy playset. However, Lisa's imagination brings the dolls to life, and they discuss the lockdown. Bart and the other children continue to watch Skinner, who see Agnes give Skinner's security blanket to Peter. They decide to help Skinner get it back. Homer tries to get Maggie to eat food with other sauces, but she refuses. Homer and Marge decide to steal Flanders' ranch dressing.

Homer and Marge break into Flanders' basement, but when Flanders hears them, Homer lets Marge escape while he and Flanders fight. Marge returns to reason with Ned, and he lets them leave with the dressing. Over video chat, Nelson attempts to buy the blanket from Peter, but is caught. Peter gloats and insults Agnes, but she and Skinner have been watching him through the video chat. They throw Peter out of their house. Lisa is melting the playset to build a wall for protection, but a caterpillar has entered her room. She throws lettuce at it, and she notices its pleasant appearance as it eats the lettuce, which relieves her dread.

The lockdown ends when the caterpillars become cocoons. However, they turn into butterflies and begin attacking the townspeople.

== Production ==
Executive producer Matt Selman wanted to have a lockdown episode without having to acknowledge the COVID-19 pandemic. He chose the idea of a caterpillar infestation based on his childhood summers on the East Coast. The idea of Maggie refusing to eat food without ranch dressing was based on a child of one of the writers.

Rob Lowe guest starred as Principal Skinner's cousin Peter. Lowe commented that voice acting was different than other forms of acting. A promotional clip featuring Cousin Peter was released two days before the episode aired.

== Reception ==
=== Viewing figures ===
The episode earned a 0.24 rating and was watched by 0.82 million viewers, which was the most watched show on Fox that night.

=== Critical response ===
Tony Sokol of Den of Geek gave the episode 4 out of 5 stars. He thought the episode was a good parody of the COVID-19 lockdowns. He highlighted the scenes of Lisa voicing her dolls with different accents. He also liked the song the Flanders family sings about the rapture.

John Schwarz of Bubbleblabber gave the episode an 8.5 out of 10. He thought the episode was "innovative." He stated that Lisa's story was scary enough to almost be a Treehouse of Horror segment. He also thought Bart's story was weak, and Rob Lowe's appearance was underused.

Cathal Gunning of Screen Rant thought that the parody of the lockdowns was late especially since the show could parody other events in a faster turnaround time. However, he stated that the parody itself was strong.
