= The Ten-Per-Cent Solution =

- The Simpsons episode
- Episode no.: Season 23; Episode 8
- Directed by: Mike Frank Polcino
- Written by: Dan Castellaneta; Deb Lacusta
- Production code: PABF02
- Original air date: December 4, 2011

Guest appearances
- Kevin Dillon as himself; Janeane Garofalo as herself; Jackie Mason as Rabbi Krustofski; Joan Rivers as Annie Dubinsky

Episode features
- Chalkboard gag: "Caucus is not a dirty word"
- Couch gag: A sword with the text "Property of Ned Flanders" on it is planted in the couch à la Excalibur. Homer's attempt at getting it out fails, but Flanders pulls it out successfully and leaves.

Episode chronology
← Previous "The Man in the Blue Flannel Pants"	Next → "Holidays of Future Passed"
- The Simpsons season 23

"The Ten-Per-Cent Solution" is the eighth episode of the twenty-third season of the American animated television series The Simpsons. It originally aired on the Fox network in the United States on December 4, 2011. In the episode, Krusty the Clown becomes depressed after getting fired from his television show for being unpopular with children. The Simpson family encourages him to make a comeback, suggesting that he seek help from an agent they met earlier at a television museum. This agent turns out to be Annie Dubinsky, who was Krusty's first agent and former girlfriend. Krusty left her when he became successful but now he begs her to take him as a client again. She accepts and together they are able to get him back on television, hosting a show for adults that features his clown tricks. However, Annie soon begins to interfere too much, which frustrates the network executives.

The episode, which contains parodies of films such as The King's Speech, The Social Network, and Black Swan, was written by cast member Dan Castellaneta and his wife Deb Lacusta. Comedian and actress Joan Rivers, who was a big fan of The Simpsons, guest starred as the character Annie. Other guest performances in the episode came from Kevin Dillon and Janeane Garofalo as themselves and Jackie Mason as Krusty's father. Reception of "The Ten-Per-Cent Solution" from television critics has been mixed, with praise directed at Rivers' appearance and the development of Krusty's character. The episode was criticized by the Parents Television Council for containing sexual dialogue. During its original American broadcast, the episode was seen by approximately nine million people.

== Plot ==
During an episode of The Krusty the Clown Show, three Itchy & Scratchy cartoons are shown in a row, angering Krusty, the host of the show, since the cartoons are taking up his airtime. Meanwhile, the Simpsons visit a television museum that is soon to be closed. After a while, they come to an exhibit displaying The Adventures of Fatso Flanagan, which is one of Homer's favorite television shows. There, the family is approached by Annie Dubinsky, the agent of the actor who played Fatso Flanagan. They start chatting and become acquainted. At the Channel 6 studios, during a board meeting, Krusty is fired because younger children prefer Itchy and Scratchy over clowns with obscure references. Krusty goes to his current agent, hoping to get a new job, but the agent drops him since he got fired.

After the Simpsons leave the museum, they head for Krusty Burger where they discover Krusty crying in a ball pit. They encourage Krusty to make a comeback, and they inform him that they met an agent that can help him out. However, when they all go to Annie's office, Annie instantly recognizes Krusty and angrily slams the door before he gets a chance to enter. It is revealed that Annie was the one who discovered Krusty, became his first agent, and was responsible for his rise to success, during which they also dated. However, once he achieved fame, Krusty fired and broke up with Annie and replaced her with a more acclaimed agent. Back in the present, he begs her to take him back as a client, and she eventually accepts.

At Annie's suggestion, Krusty starts performing his clown tricks at a theater in front of adult audiences, who enjoy the things they liked as children. The performances are praised by both the audiences and the critics, and Krusty and Annie start dating again. Soon, a premium cable television network called HBOWTIME (a portmanteau of HBO and Showtime, also parodying HBO's slogan as "It's not just TV, it's more expensive.") gives Krusty his own show and Annie is hired as the producer on his demand. The stars of the series Entourage, such as Kevin Dillon, become Krusty's assistants. The network executives soon become frustrated with Annie for her high temper and for meddling too much in the show, including refusing to let Janeane Garofalo appear only because Garofalo is funnier than Krusty. The executives decide to fire Annie, but Krusty refuses to continue without her. The couple therefore turns to another network where they start a show called Sex Over Sixty, with them as the stars.

== Production ==
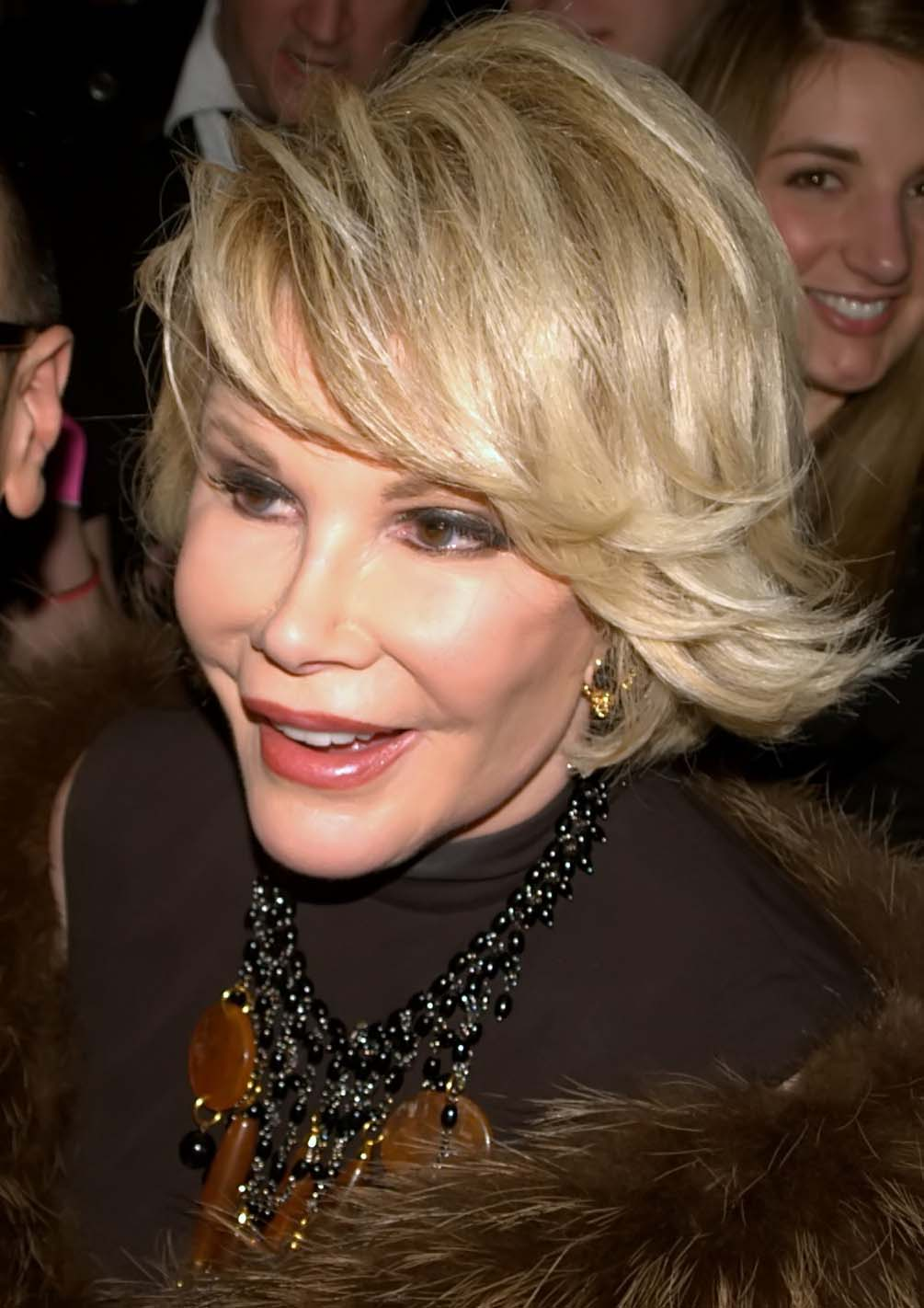
Joan Rivers guest starred in the episode as Annie.

"The Ten-Per-Cent Solution" was written by Dan Castellaneta, who voices characters such as Homer and Krusty on The Simpsons, and his wife Deb Lacusta. American comedian and actress Joan Rivers guest starred in the episode as Annie. She recorded her lines in March 2011. In an interview with E! News at that time, Rivers noted that this was not her first animated voice-over role, though it was her biggest one yet. She further added that she is a fan of the show because it is "so clever and so funny on so many levels. So when they called and said, 'Do you want to do it?' without even reading a script I said, 'Absolutely.'" Adam Buckman, a former television columnist at the New York Post, noted on his blog that the story of the episode is similar to a period in Rivers' life at the end of the 1980s. At that time, she was hosting The Late Show Starring Joan Rivers on the Fox network. When Rivers challenged Fox executives who wanted to fire her husband Edgar Rosenberg as the show's executive producer, the network fired them both. Rosenberg committed suicide just three months later. Buckman wrote that the story of "The Ten-Per-Cent Solution" was "no doubt devised with Rivers’ approval and possibly with her input", and that "only a comedian of her stature and experience" would attempt to spoof a personal tragedy such as this one. Other guest stars in the episode include actor Kevin Dillon and stand-up comedian Janeane Garofalo as themselves, and stand-up comedian Jackie Mason in a minor reprisal of his role as Krusty's father, speaking only one line.

Several references to popular culture, including a meta-reference to The Simpsons, are included in "The Ten-Per-Cent Solution". The three The Itchy & Scratchy cartoons that are shown at the beginning of the episode as Krusty is hosting his show are all parodies of films released in 2010: the first one, titled The Cat's Speech, is a parody of The King's Speech; the second one, titled The Social Petwork, parodies The Social Network in that the storyline is partially explained through the use of screens containing nothing but text; and the final one, titled Black and Blue Swan, references Black Swan. After the three cartoons are shown, Krusty points out that "It’s like those parodies were written when the movies came out, but it took so long to animate them that we look dated and hacky!" This is a reference to the long time it takes to produce an episode of The Simpsons—hence why cultural references on the show can often be seen as dated. Pop culture allusions at the television museum include a brief appearance by the main characters of the animated series King of the Hill as cardboard cutouts being taken down in a process similar to the opening of the show, an exhibit devoted to the sitcom The Beverly Hillbillies, and the showing of one of Homer's favorite television shows, Fatso Flanagan, which is a knockoff of the sitcom The Honeymooners.

The music that is played during the parody of The King's Speech is "Symphony No. 7" by Ludwig van Beethoven, and a musical piece from the Swan Lake ballet is played during the Black Swan parody. For the King of the Hill visual gag, the Simpsons staff acquired the rights to use the actual theme song from that show. The music that is played as Krusty performs his new show in front of adults at the theater is a mixture of the old Krusty theme and the theme from Playboy After Dark, a television show hosted by Hugh Hefner that started airing in the 1960s and featured parties from a Playboy club. This musical combination was composed by Alf Clausen after The Simpsons music editor Chris Ledesma came with the suggestion. On his blog, Ledesma wrote that theme for Playboy After Dark "was cool and jazzy and just right for its time. Alf’s homage to that theme, wrapped around Krusty’s theme was very clever indeed." For the 2nd time in the show's history, a joke regarding Krusty and the Paul Reubens masturbation scandal was made (the first one was in I Love Lisa; when Annie says that doing a children's show helped Pee-wee Herman bounce back after his scandal, Krusty asks what Pee-wee did and after Annie tells him he says "That's all? I did that while you were on the phone!")

== Release and reception ==
"The Ten-Per-Cent Solution" originally aired on the Fox network in the United States on December 4, 2011. It was watched by approximately nine million people during this broadcast. In the demographic for adults aged 18–49, the episode received a 4.0 Nielsen rating (a fifty-four percent increase over the previous episode) and a ten percent share. The high rating was the result of the episode being preceded by a popular National Football League game. The Simpsons became the highest-rated program in Fox's Animation Domination lineup that night in terms of both total viewers and in the 18–49 demographic, finishing ahead of new episodes of Family Guy, The Cleveland Show, and Allen Gregory. For the week of November 28 – December 4, 2011, "The Ten-Per-Cent Solution" placed seventh in the ratings among all prime-time broadcasts in the 18–49 demographic.

Since airing, the episode has received mixed to positive reviews from critics. Hayden Childs of The A.V. Club praised the choice of having Rivers guest star since she was able to "employ her trademark humor within the world of The Simpsons without hijacking the plot or satire." He also noted that while the Simpson family does not appear heavily, "Krusty is such a large part of the supporting cast that he carries this episode well. While it may seem a little funny that Castellaneta, who voices Krusty, wrote such a large part for himself, it is also a testament to his empathy for Krusty that this episode both deepens our understanding of Krusty and actually allows him growth as a character in an organic fashion." Ology's Josh Harrison similarly praised "The Ten-Per-Cent Solution" for having "some wonderful Krusty the Klown moments and some clutch guest star appearances". He also cited the visual gags in the episode as "clever". Harrison concluded his review by writing that though the episode "wasn't Simpsons gold, it was a great chance to focus on a secondary character and an opportunity for Joan Rivers to, um, be Joan Rivers. I imagine your assessment of the episode may be based largely on your opinion of the guest star. That said? I dug it."

AOL TV's Jason Hughes was more critical of the episode, for taking a "soft approach" to the television industry when it "had a chance for some sharp satire". He elaborated that the writers "had a little bit of fun talking about networks meddling in shows – as well as agents trying to control content as when Joan Rivers booted Janeane Garofalo for being funnier than Krusty – and the differences between cable original programming and broadcast programming. But they had the potential they had to make some bold statements about television and how the industry works throughout, and simply didn't." Hughes did, however, like the King of the Hill appearance, which he described as a "fun nod". Further criticism came from the conservative Parents Television Council (PTC), which named The Simpsons the "Worst TV Show of the Week" because "The Ten-Per-Cent Solution" contains "content inappropriate for the Family Hour". The group wrote that the "frank sexual dialogue warranted a TV-14 rating, but the episode was rated TV-PG. Fox network executives surely know that almost nothing that comes out of Joan Rivers’ mouth is rated PG; but they chose to rate the program inappropriately anyway, thus blindsiding parents and children with crude content." PTC cited examples such as Annie saying that every night in his early days, Krusty "had [his audience] rolling in the aisles, followed by a roll in the hay with me," and that "Today's kids are less sensitive than an Army condom. They see more on TV than my mother did on her wedding night. And they don't complain about it for the next 50 years."

== See also ==
- The Seven-Per-Cent Solution (film)
