= Stew Lies =

- The Simpsons episode
- Episode no.: Season 36; Episode 19
- Directed by: Debbie Bruce Mahan
- Written by: Broti Gupta
- Production code: 36ABF09
- Original air date: May 4, 2025

Guest appearances
- John DiMaggio as Thad; Maurice LaMarche as Wilhelm von Wonthelm; Joe Mantegna as Fat Tony

Episode features
- Chalkboard gag: "No booger is so perfect it 'demands to be flicked'"
- Couch gag: A couch gag computer program is opened, and a window with the Simpsons is resized several times. The user attempts to delete Homer, but an error occurs.

Episode chronology
← Previous "Abe League of Their Moe"	Next → "Full Heart, Empty Pool"
- The Simpsons season 36

"Stew Lies" is the nineteenth episode of the thirty-sixth season of the American animated television series The Simpsons, and the 788th episode overall. It aired in the United States on Fox on May 4, 2025. The episode was written by Broti Gupta and directed by Debbie Bruce Mahan.

In this episode, Homer and his favorite food show host get into trouble when the host reveals the recipe for Fat Tony's stew. John DiMaggio and Maurice LaMarche guest starred. The episode received positive reviews.

== Plot ==
When Marge allows Lisa to sit in the front passenger car seat even though Bart claimed it, he begins to copy everything she says. Lisa asks Homer for help while he watches his favorite show Dude Vs. Food, hosted by Thad Parkour, in which he competes in food-eating challenges, so Homer ignores her. Over several months, Lisa uses the situation to teach Bart Mandarin and how to play the saxophone, and they bond with each other. Meanwhile, Homer learns that Thad is coming to shoot an episode of his show in Springfield. On the day of the challenge, Thad arrives sick and loses consciousness as the challenge begins.

Thad wants to end his career due to his health. Not wanting him to quit, Homer takes him to a place where all the odors from food made in Springfield converge. Thad smells the foods, which remind him of different times in his life and reignite his love of food. Thad smells something new, and they follow the odor to Fat Tony's house. He tells the story of his father, who kept the peace with the Prussian mob, headed by Wilhelm von Wonthelm, by exchanging sons. Wilhelm's oldest son, Maximillian, was not interested in the family business, so he began to favor Fat Tony. Wilhelm planned to pass the secret recipe for the "Stew of Violence" to his son to initiate him into the mob, but he refused to go. Wilhelm suddenly died and gave the recipe to Fat Tony while Maximillian became head of the Prussian mob. Fat Tony lets Thad and Homer sample the stew. Later, a trailer for Thad's new show airs where he steals the secret recipes of food and reveals them on the show. The first episode is for the Stew of Violence. With his life in danger, Fat Tony throws Homer off a bridge into a river as revenge.

Using his phone, Homer texts Fat Tony a plan to save them, so he retrieves him. They go to the studio to threaten Thad, who secretly filmed the recipe with his sunglasses. The Prussians arrive to kill them, so they run to the location of the smell convergence. Maximillian smells the stew as the townsfolk cook it while the episode airs, and Homer says the town is honoring his father. Maximillian remembers when Wilhelm cooked it for him when he was sick and makes peace with Fat Tony.

== Production ==
Fat Tony's recipe was created by chefs J. Kenji López-Alt and Deb Perelman. The chefs appear in the episode on a poster for their podcast The Recipe with Kenji and Deb.

John DiMaggio guest starred as Thad. DiMaggio previously appeared on the series as Bender from the television series Futurama, created by Simpsons creator Matt Groening. Mads Mikkelsen was announced to guest star as Wilhelm von Wonthelm but did not appear in the episode; Maurice LaMarche voiced the character instead.

== Cultural references ==
The episode title is a parody of the 1994 film True Lies.

Thad Parkour is modelled after celebrity chef, television presenter and restauranteur Guy Fieri.

Fat Tony's story about two different organized crime families swapping sons is a reference to the premise of the fourth season of Fargo as seen in the episode "Welcome to the Alternate Economy."

When Thad smells the food aromas and has flashbacks, it is parodying the 2007 Disney movie, Ratatouille.

Dude vs. Food is a parody of the food reality television series Man v. Food.

== Reception ==
=== Viewing figures ===
The episode earned a 0.15 rating and was watched by 0.63 million viewers, which was the second-most watched show on Fox that night.

=== Critical response ===
John Schwarz of Bubbleblabber gave the episode a 7.5 out of 10. He thought the plot was not original but was a "fun gag", and he liked Bart and Lisa's subplot more. He also felt DiMaggio was playing Bender but with food references. Alex Reif of Laughing Place liked the story but thought the episode was not "particularly funny". He liked the commentary of chefs as television hosts and the rate in which food shows are produced. He also liked the episode had chalkboard and couch gags, which are generally absent in contemporary episodes.

JM McNab of Cracked.com and Marisa Roffman of Give Me My Remote also highlighted Bart and Lisa's subplot. Cathal Gunning of Screen Rant expressed disappointment that Homer's brother, Herb Powell, did not appear, describing the episode as a disappointment. Nick Valdez of Comicbook.com ranked the episode ninth on his list of all episodes of the season. He praised the opening, but "the rest of the episode doesn't reach that level." He commented, "The only thing is that it starts so strong and ends so weak that it can't move higher on the list."
