= The Food Wife =

- The Simpsons episode
- Episode no.: Season 23; Episode 5
- Directed by: Timothy Bailey
- Written by: Matt Selman
- Production code: NABF20
- Original air date: November 13, 2011

Guest appearances
- Mario Batali as himself; Anthony Bourdain as himself; Tim Heidecker as Amus Bruse; Gordon Ramsay as himself; Eric Wareheim as Fois Garth

Episode chronology
← Previous "Replaceable You"	Next → "The Book Job"
- The Simpsons season 23

"The Food Wife" is the fifth episode of the twenty-third season of the American animated television series The Simpsons. It originally aired on the Fox network in the United States on November 13, 2011, and was seen by around 7.5 million people during this broadcast. In the episode, Homer feels left out when Marge, Bart, and Lisa join a group of foodies. Their personal blog quickly becomes popular and the trio is invited to a molecular gastronomy restaurant. Feeling pity toward Homer, Marge invites him along. However, after beginning to worry that he will reclaim his position as the parent perceived as the most fun by the children, she sends him to the wrong address. Homer unknowingly arrives at a meth lab, where a gunfight starts as the police burst in.

The episode was written by Matt Selman. It contains several references to different foods and famous chefs, and is largely devoted to the foodie culture, which Selman has said that he "always thought was funny and fascinating. The idea of food as not only something you enjoy eating, but as something that you are so passionate about that you're kind of bragging about it." Tim Heidecker and Eric Wareheim, the stars and creators of Tim and Eric Awesome Show, Great Job!, guest starred in the episode as two foodies and performed a hip hop song that makes fun of foodies. Chefs and media personalities Anthony Bourdain, Gordon Ramsay, and Mario Batali also guest starred in the episode, but as themselves in a dream sequence. Although "The Food Wife" has received generally positive reviews from television critics, particularly for the hip hop song, it has also attracted criticism from certain food critics.

== Plot ==
Homer takes Bart and Lisa to a video game convention. Upon their return home, Marge feels upset that Homer gets to be the "fun dad", while she is stuck doing unexciting things with the children. The next Saturday, she decides to take Bart and Lisa to an "X-Games" convention, thinking it will be something fun. However, when they arrive, they are disappointed to find out that it is a Christian event, and the actual name of the convention is "† Games". The car engine dies on the way back and they are forced to stop in the neighborhood of Little Ethiopia, where the three go into a restaurant serving Ethiopian food. Although initially averse to the exotic food, Marge is reminded that she wants to be a fun mom and therefore asks for the most authentic dish on the menu for her and her children. All three of them enjoy the food and are joined by a group of foodies, who share anecdotes on their food adventures. After unsuccessfully trying to persuade a resistant and gluttonous Homer to try their Ethiopian takeout, Marge, Bart and Lisa start their own food blog, "The Three Mouthketeers". The blog quickly becomes popular and the three spend much time together trying out new foods and writing about them.

When the trio gets an invitation to an exclusive molecular gastronomy restaurant called El Chemistri, Homer is angry over being left out. Marge invites him out of pity and he plans to reclaim his "fun dad" title, leaving Marge worried about losing her new bond with the children. In one of her dreams that night, she and the children are trying out new food together with chef Anthony Bourdain when Homer jumps in on a hop ball and eats up everything, taking away the children's attention from Marge. Homer, Bart, Lisa, Bourdain, and other famous chefs that have shown up, such as Mario Batali, then jump away from Marge on hop balls, leaving her by herself. Afterwards, Gordon Ramsay appears next to her, telling her she should not have invited Homer. The next day, she deliberately gives Homer the wrong address to the restaurant.

When Marge and the children arrive at El Chemistri, Homer unknowingly arrives at an illegal meth lab that he thinks is the actual restaurant. He meets the meth dealer and other drug addicts, whom he believes to be food hipsters. Just as he is about to have a taste of the meth (which he thinks is food produced with the help of molecular gastronomy), the police burst in and a gunfight ensues between them and the drug addicts. While the trio eat their meal (deconstructed Caesar salad and miniaturized pork chops) with other foodies at El Chemistri, Marge feels guilty about misdirecting Homer and receives a panicked voicemail from him requesting help. After unsuccessfully asking the other foodies to help save her husband, she, Bart, and Lisa head by themselves towards the meth lab after receiving doggie bags from the chef. After arriving, Marge throws apple pie from her doggie bag into the mouth of the meth dealer, causing a flashback to his childhood when his mother used to make apple pie (a reference to the flashback experienced by the infamous “Anton Ego” in the Pixar's 2007 film Ratatouille). With the help of this distraction, the police subdue him. After Marge apologizes to Homer, they decide to have fun together as a whole family from now on. At Krustyland, Homer gives the kids $50 to enjoy themselves and he decides to spend quality time with Marge.

== Production ==
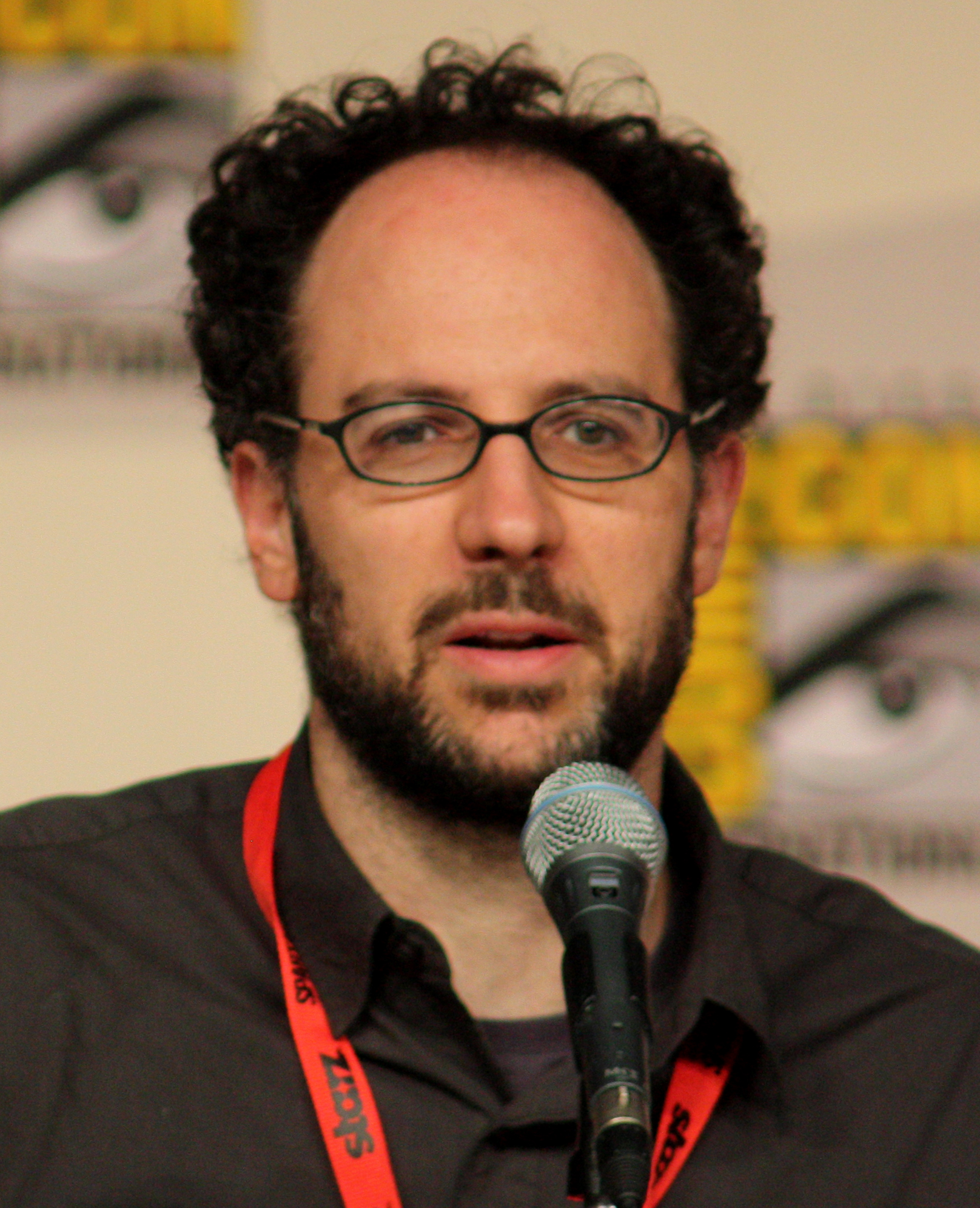
Staff member Matt Selman wrote the episode.

"The Food Wife" was written by executive producer of The Simpsons Matt Selman. The writing process began around September 2010. According to Selman, the episode mainly revolves around Homer and Marge competing about who is perceived as the most fun by Bart and Lisa, a situation that he thinks parents can identify with in real-life. The episode also focuses heavily on foodies and food blogs. Selman said in an interview with New York magazine's Grub Street publication that the foodie culture is "just a world that I always thought was funny and fascinating. The idea of food as not only something you enjoy eating, but as something that you are so passionate about that you're kind of bragging about it. 'I'm the one who discovered this particular Korean pork-neck soup restaurant,' and you can kind of claim that as yours. The blogging just feeds into that kind of territorial element that I always thought was inherently funny. And when I write Simpsons episodes, I try to start with a world I think is funny, and think, 'What's a good story we can tell in that world, using the characters that we have?'"

Describing himself as "sort of a foodie", Selman has said that food is constantly on his mind and that he particularly likes reading food critic Jonathan Gold's reviews in LA Weekly. He told LA Weekly's Squid Ink food blog that he likes foodies, despite making fun of them in "The Food Wife". He commented that on the show, he has often "taken something that I love, found the one little weird, bad thing about it and harped on that", giving foodies as an example and writing: "You can make fun of them for being pretentious or snobby or taking the fun out of eating. That you'd rather photograph something than taste it is a funny nuance of the phenomenon. That it's more about sticking your flag in something than actually enjoying it. We kind of make fun of foodies, but in real life we actually love them."

Selman was pleased with the finished result of the episode. He noted in the interview with Grub Street that Marge starting to blog about food "does not sound inherently exciting, but the episode itself is actually very exciting, and I'm super thrilled with the way it's turned out." Selman thinks a strong thing about the episode is the fact that, despite Homer's love for food, Homer is not the one that becomes a foodie as one might expect. He explained that this is because although Homer loves eating, "he's kind of a blue-collar kind of guy who doesn't like foreign food, weird food, savoring food, intellectualizing food, blogging about it, photographing it – he just wants to be stuffed all the time."

=== Cultural references ===
Selman wanted to include things in the episode that "only really hard-core foodies would have any idea what we were talking about. This was like a love letter to foodie culture." Food references featured in the episode include jokes about Sriracha sauce and sous-vide cooking, referrals to chefs Wylie Dufresne, Frank Bruni, and Ruth Reichl, a mention of the soup phở from Vietnam and how to pronounce it correctly, and the inclusion of the El Chemistri owner who is based on the Spanish chef José Andrés (known for using molecular gastronomy). Selman has commented that food produced with the help of molecular gastronomy "lends itself to comedy quite nicely. There's a dish [at El Chemistri], for instance, called Regret. The waiter cries into one's soup when he serves it. The human tear is the final ingredient." The fictional character Swedish Chef is also seen in the episode, and the scene where the meth dealer is reminded of his childhood after eating the apple pie is a reference to the Pixar film Ratatouille, which was written and directed by former Simpsons consultant Brad Bird.

In addition to the foodie culture, "The Food Wife" parodies the video game industry and references games such as God of War, Grand Theft Auto, Assassin's Creed, Half-Life, BioShock, Call of Duty, Dig Dug, Driver: San Francisco, Halo, Lego Harry Potter: Years 1–4, Lego Star Wars, Medal of Honor, Madden NFL, Q*bert, Resident Evil: Revelations, Shaun White Snowboarding, and Rayman Origins. In addition, it also references the movie, WarGames, with the video game company, Protovision. In the episode, Homer, Bart, and Lisa visit a video game convention called the Expensive Electronic Entertainment Expo (E4), which is parody of the Electronic Entertainment Expo (E3) that is presented annually in the United States by the Entertainment Software Association. This marked the first time that the family visited a video game convention in The Simpsons. Selman and other staff members on the show had previously visited E3 during the release of The Simpsons video games such as The Simpsons Game. While appearing on GameTrailers TV with Geoff Keighley on November 11, 2011, Selman commented that "We've been to so many [E3s] and we've been pushed around, and knocked around, and seen so many PR guys [talk] about how hard it was working on their game. We've seen how expensive the food is, and how nuts it is, and the bloggers, and the photos, and just the noises [...] We had to do it on the show."

In the episode, Homer and his children want to see the unveiling of a new Funtendo console called Zii Zu, which is a parody of Nintendo's Wii U console. As he and the children make their way through the crowded convention to get to the unveiling, the screen turns into a first-person shooter game through the eyes of Homer. He uses Frisbees and a fire extinguisher as weapons to get forward. According to Selman, the inspiration for this came from the fact that "if you've been to E3, you know it's insane, it's super-crowded, it's super-loud, and walking through it feels like a video game, like a nightmarish first-person video game of bloggers and nerds. You just want to get the thing that you want to get to."

The title of the episode is a parody of The Good Wife.

=== Guest appearances ===
Tim Heidecker and Eric Wareheim, the stars and creators of the American sketch comedy television series Tim and Eric Awesome Show, Great Job!, guest starred in the episode as foodies Amus Bruse and Fois Garth, respectively. These two characters are among the foodies that Marge, Bart, and Lisa meet at the Ethiopian restaurant. In the episode, they rhyme a hip hop song that according to Selman is "all bragging about how awesome and cool you are as a foodie." It was co-written by the duo, and was inspired by the song "Empire State of Mind". Selman has commented that "In animated TV shows, whenever you're trying to show people having fun doing their new thing [in this case, Marge and the children creating content for their blog], it just kind of becomes a boring montage. And we've done so many montages on The Simpsons over 25 years, it's like, oh, God, no more montages. [...] So we were like, 'Why not do a silly rap song?' Rapping is sort of inherently boastful, and there's something about being a foodie that's inherently boastful. It's like the boastfulness links those things. So Tim and Eric perform a food rap song in the show—an extremely silly rap song, and the name is intentionally silly: 'Blogging a Food Blog.'"

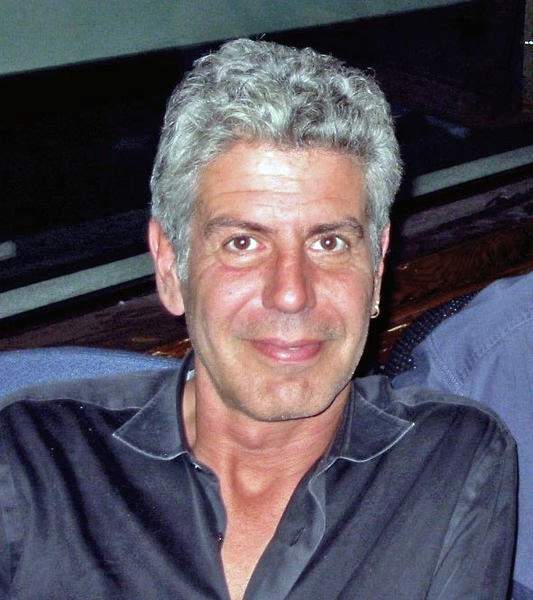
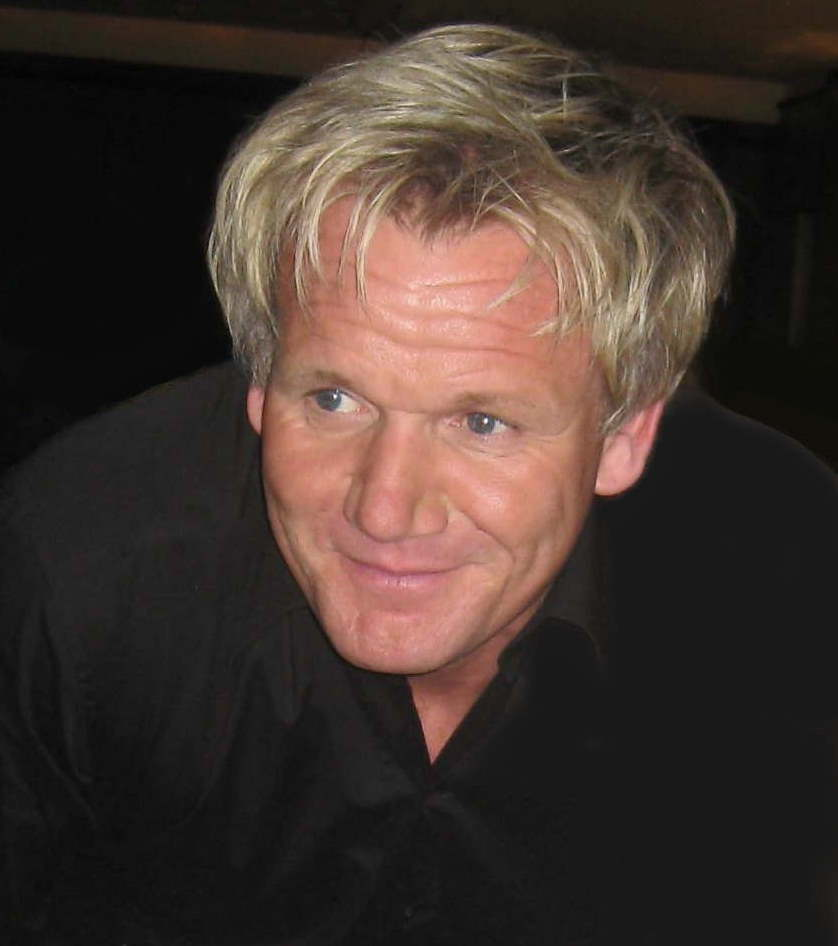
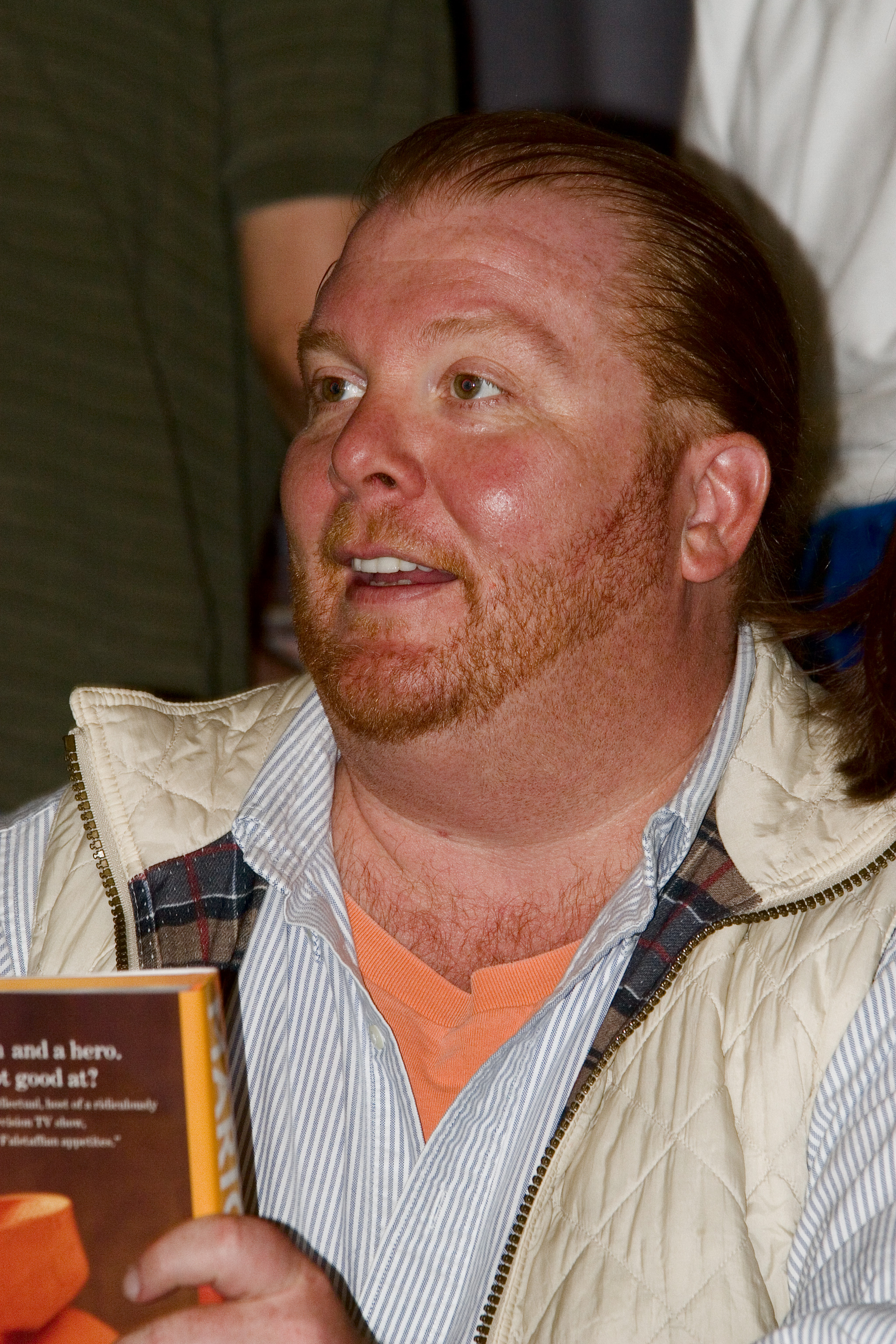
Chefs and media personalities (from left to right) Anthony Bourdain, Gordon Ramsay, and Mario Batali guest starred in the episode as themselves.

American chef Anthony Bourdain guest starred in the episode as himself. Selman wanted him on the show because he is a big fan and he thinks Marge would have a liking for him. Bourdain's appearance was cut short because the episode ended up being too long, and as a result, his "bad boy persona is not fully explored," Selman told Squid Ink. In addition to Bourdain, guest stars in the episode include chefs and media personalities Gordon Ramsay and Mario Batali as themselves. These three all appear in Marge's dream. When asked by Digital Spy about his appearance, Ramsay said that "I grew up watching The Simpsons and love that they're foodies," and joked that "For God's sake, I had to promise Marge a spot on MasterChef to get on the bloody show!" Selman wishes that he could have given Batali more than one line, but has admitted that "You just can't fit everything into a 21-minute show."

== Release ==
The episode originally aired on the Fox network in the United States on November 13, 2011. It was watched by approximately 7.5 million people during this broadcast. In the demographic for adults aged 18–49, the episode received a 3.4 Nielsen rating (down five percent from the previous episode) and an eight percent share. The Simpsons became the highest-rated program in Fox's Animation Domination lineup that night in terms of both total viewers and in the 18–49 demographic, finishing before new episodes of Family Guy, American Dad!, and Allen Gregory. For the week of November 7–13, "The Food Wife" finished seventeenth in the ratings among all prime-time broadcasts in the 18–49 demographic.

== Reception ==
=== Critical reviews ===
Since airing, the episode has received mostly positive reviews from television critics. Ology (website)'s Josh Harrison gave it an eight out of ten rating, writing that "You gotta love these Simpsons episodes that really get into the heart of a subculture. Diving head-first into the world of foodies and food blogging (after a hilarious geeky pit-stop at a video game expo), 'The Food Wife' shish-kabobs gourmet diehards while highlighting a very real problem between Homer and Marge." He concluded that the episode is "a definite swing for the fences, and I think it hits its mark completely." The scenes at the video game convention were praised by Anthony Severino of Game Revolution as well. He commented that the writers "nailed it. Everything from the massive displays, long lines, and even the look of the Los Angeles Convention Center was spot on. The best was how they portrayed people with 'VIP passes', you know those things that we journalists get, as douches who think they're better than the regulars."

In his review of "The Food Wife", HitFix's Alan Sepinwall commended it for "stay[ing] true to the characters. Of course the kids would consider Homer to be the fun dad on those occasions when he's actually making an effort, and of course Marge would feel jealous of this. And if she goes too far in trying to keep this as her special thing, she also recognizes it immediately, feels guilty throughout the meal and then heads off to save the day, complete with a great homage to the climax of Ratatouille." Sepinwall also praised the episode for being "packed with great jokes", such as Heidecker and Wareheim's hip hop song and the scenes at the video game convention where the screen turns into a first-person shooter game. Similarly, Haydens Childs of The A.V. Club praised the episode as "funny and well-observed", giving it a B+ grade, and cited the hip hop song as the highlight of the episode. He also praised Bourdain, Batali, and Ramsay, and stated that he wished Bourdain would have gotten a bigger part in the episode. Childs further wrote that "The best thing about this episode is that it doesn't try to stuff any outlandish plot mechanics or out-of-character character moments down the viewers' throats. It sticks to the basics: the family dynamic combined with gentle mocking of a still-current fad. I say 'still-current' because although it is probably true that food blogging is a bit past its expiration date in some cities, I don't think that it has been overdone everywhere."

=== Response from food critics ===
Reception of "The Food Wife" from food critics has been mixed to positive. Before the episode aired, Robert Sietsema of The Village Voice disapproved of it for being outdated. He commented that "this show should have been done, say, two or three years ago, when food blogging was hot. By now, many food bloggers of our acquaintance have out-migrated to paying gigs, and the concept of the food blog has been co-opted by every major media outlet, rendering real food blogs – the old-fashioned kind, where someone stood alone in their kitchen cooking things, or wandered the hinterlands seeking out unique deliciousness – nearly obsolete." Sietsema also criticized the scenes showcasing molecular gastronomy because he thought they were out of date, since molecular gastronomy is, "by now, long past its prime". Chris Shott, a food critic for Washington City Paper's Young & Hungry column and blog, wrote negatively about the character that owns El Chemistri and is a parody of José Andrés. He commented that "For one thing, the character seems far more subdued than the kooky, wild-eyed power drill-wielding cook we saw on Conan recently. The satire here, involving a deconstructed Caesar salad of foams, gels and airs, is more a riff on molecular gastronomy in general than a send-up of Andrés' over-the-top personality."

Food critic Katharine Shilcutt of the Houston Press' criticized the episode for giving what she thought was an inaccurate depiction of foodies, as people that are "tacky, snotty, slightly racist, hoarders of food experiences that you gather like rare gems and patronizingly hold over other people's heads." Shilcutt added that she found it upsetting that what she believes to be the moral of the episode is that "Educated, passionate people are elitists. It reduces all the hard work that people put into creating good, honest food into a joke, and not a terribly funny one. There was no balance in the episode between smug, arrogant, obnoxious foodies and those who have a genuine, guileless interest in food and all its important permutations in our lives."

Other food critics have written positively about "The Food Wife". Lesley Balla of LA Weekly's Squid Ink blog listed her ten favorite quotes from the episode, placing the entire hip hop song about foodies and food blogging at the top. She commented that "Plenty of insider jokes at foodies' expense season the episode. So was it as funny to a non-food-world person as it was to someone who could identify each culinary personality in Marge's dream [...]? Safe to say, yes; it is still The Simpsons, after all. For foodists, the whole episode is entirely quotable — we're sure it will be in the food blogosphere for years to come." Laine Doss, a food blogger for the Miami New Times and New Times Broward-Palm Beach, commented that she "loved Lisa Simpson's list of cutest vegetarians [that appears on the blog], which included Paul McCartney, Russell Brand, and Edward Cullen." Doss, as well as Elizabeth Gunnison of Esquire's Eat Like a Man blog, also commended the hip hop song.
