= Jeff Westbrook =

American television writer

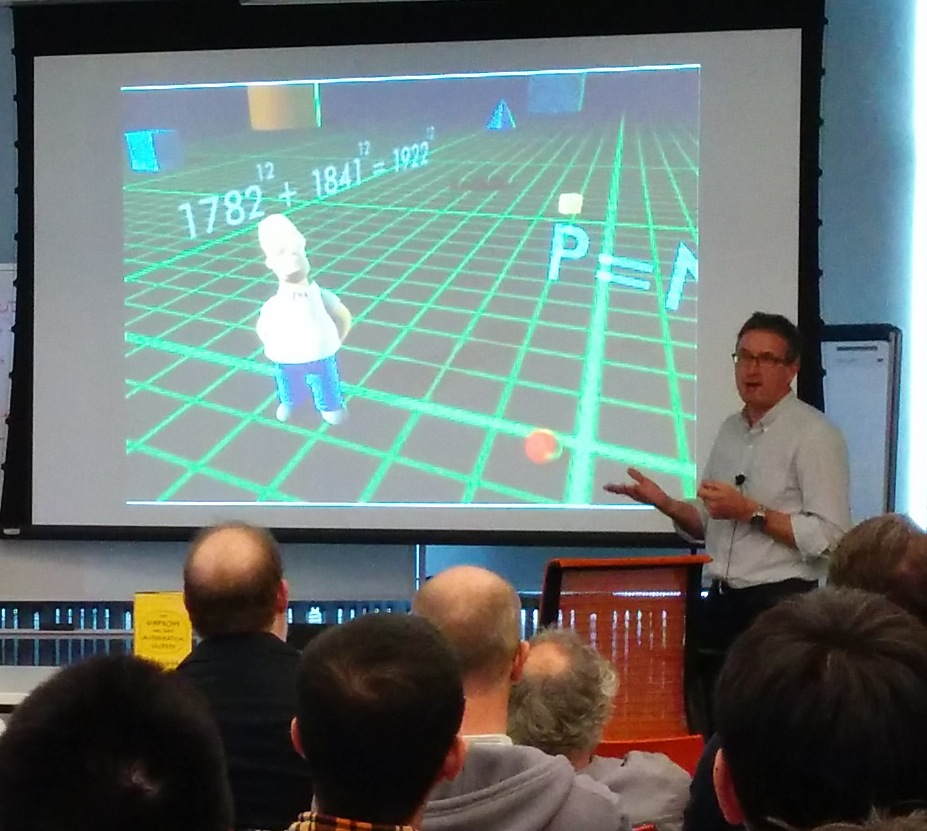
Jeff Westbrook presenting a talk on the math in The Simpsons in the episode "Treehouse of Horror VI."

Jeff Westbrook is a TV writer best known for his work on The Simpsons and Futurama, for which he is a three-time winner of the WGA Award.

== Education and pre-TV ==
Prior to becoming a TV writer, Westbrook was a successful algorithms researcher. After majoring in physics and history of science at Harvard University, he studied computer science with Robert Tarjan at Princeton University, receiving his Ph.D. in 1989 with a thesis entitled Algorithms and Data Structures for Dynamic Graph Algorithms. He then took a faculty position at Yale University, later becoming a researcher for AT&T Laboratories before leaving research for Hollywood.

=== Erdős and Bacon numbers ===
Westbrook's Erdős number is three due to his research collaborations with Tarjan and others. His Bacon number is also three, due to his appearance as an extra in the movie Master and Commander: The Far Side of the World, giving a combined Erdős–Bacon number of six.

== Writing credits ==
=== Futurama episodes ===
- "The Day the Earth Stood Stupid" (2001)
- "The 30% Iron Chef" (2002)
- "Teenage Mutant Leela's Hurdles" (2003)

=== The Simpsons episodes ===
- "On a Clear Day I Can't See My Sister" (2005)
- "The Wettest Stories Ever Told" (2006)
- "Kill Gil, Volumes I & II" (2006) – Won 2007 WGA Award in the Animation category
- "Apocalypse Cow" (2008) – Won 2008 WGA Award in the Animation category
- "No Loan Again, Naturally" (2009)
- "Pranks and Greens" (2009)
- "The Ned-Liest Catch" (2011)
- "The Man in the Blue Flannel Pants" (2011)
- "Ned 'n' Edna's Blend Agenda" (2012) – Won 2012 WGA Award in the Animation category
- "Treehouse of Horror XXIV" (2013)
- "The Man Who Grew Too Much" (2014)
- "The Wreck of the Relationship" (2014)
- "Let's Go Fly a Coot" (2015)
- “The Nightmare After Krustmas” (2016)
- "Caper Chase" (2017)
- "No Good Read Goes Unpunished" (2018)
- "'Tis the 30th Season" (2018)
- "I Want You (She's So Heavy)" (2019)
- "Bobby, It's Cold Outside" (2019)
- "Better Off Ned" (2020)
- "The Road to Cincinnati" (2020)
- "Diary Queen" (2021)
- "Girls Just Shauna Have Fun" (2022)
- "Pin Gal" (2023)
- "Clown V. Board of Education" (2023)
- "Treehouse of Horror XXXIV" (2023)
- "Shoddy Heat" (2024)
- "Full Heart, Empty Pool" (2025)
- "Seperance" (2026)
