= Clown V. Board of Education =

- The Simpsons episode
- Episode no.: Season 34; Episode 21
- Directed by: Lance Kramer
- Written by: Jeff Westbrook
- Production code: OABF15
- Original air date: May 14, 2023

Guest appearance
- Joe Mantegna as Fat Tony

Episode chronology
← Previous "The Very Hungry Caterpillars"	Next → "Homer's Adventures Through the Windshield Glass"
- The Simpsons season 34

"Clown V. Board of Education" is the twenty-first episode of the thirty-fourth season of the American animated television series The Simpsons, and the 749th episode overall. It aired in the United States on Fox on May 14, 2023. The episode was directed by Lance Kramer and written by Jeff Westbrook.

In this episode, Krusty opens a school to teach children how to be clowns. The episode received negative reviews.

== Plot ==
While filming his show, Krusty sees that no one in his audience is laughing at his jokes. He learns that the studio audience is composed of elderly people because children are not interested in watching. Discussing the issue with other clowns, he gets an idea to open a clown school for children. He also realizes he can profit from tuition fees. He convinces the town to allow him to open the school. Bart asks Homer to enroll him in the school. Although he has low grades, Homer says that other children will follow if Bart enrolls, so Krusty accepts him.

Bart excels at the clown school even though Lisa questions its legitimacy. The school competes in a science competition with Springfield Elementary School and wins. This causes parents to praise Krusty's efforts in the school. Later, Fat Tony threatens Krusty into taking over the school. Krusty tries to resist, but he eventually allows it.

The state of the school becomes worse as Fat Tony takes money out of the school. Krusty goes to the police for help, and they have Krusty wear a recording device to incriminate Fat Tony. Krusty is caught in the act, but the students protect Krusty from being killed. Instead, Fat Tony decides to burn down the school. Krusty is sadden by this, but is comforted by Bart.

== Production ==
Executive producer Al Jean revealed plot details about the episode on December 16, 2022.

== Reception ==
=== Viewing figures ===
The episode earned a 0.22 rating and was watched by 0.77 million viewers, which was the most watched show on Fox that night.

=== Critical response ===
The episode received mostly negative reviews.

Tony Sokol of Den of Geek gave the episode 3.5 out of 5 stars. He felt the episode was a repeat of the sixth season episode "Homie the Clown." He also pointed out how Fat Tony took over the previous school as he did in this episode.

John Schwarz of Bubbleblabber gave the episode a 4 out of 10. He also thought the episode was a repeat of "Homie the Clown." He also felt the episode had few jokes.

Cathal Gunning of Screen Rant thought the episode was not only a repeat of "Homie the Clown" but also included a plot point from the eleventh season episode "Grift of the Magi."
