= Replaceable You =

- The Simpsons episode
- Episode no.: Season 23; Episode 4
- Directed by: Mark Kirkland
- Written by: Stephanie Gillis
- Production code: NABF21
- Original air date: November 6, 2011

Guest appearance
- Jane Lynch as Roz

Episode features
- Chalkboard gag: "It's November 6th. How come we're not airing a Halloween show?"
- Couch gag: Repeat of the couch gag from "Homer Scissorhands".

Episode chronology
← Previous "Treehouse of Horror XXII"	Next → "The Food Wife"
- The Simpsons season 23

"Replaceable You" is the fourth episode of the twenty-third season of the American animated television series The Simpsons. It originally aired on the Fox network in the United States on November 6, 2011. In the episode, Homer gets a new assistant named Roz who is secretly out to steal his job. Meanwhile, Bart teams up with Martin Prince for the upcoming Springfield Elementary science fair, constructing robot baby seals that become popular with the senior citizens at the Springfield Retirement Castle. The role of Roz was played by American actress Jane Lynch. "Replaceable You" was seen by approximately eight million viewers during its original broadcast, and it has received mixed reviews from critics.

== Plot ==
Homer is initially happy to get an organized, cheerful, new assistant at the Springfield Nuclear Power Plant, a very tall woman named Roz Davis. However, when he and Barney head out to see a film during their work shift, Roz reveals this to Mr. Burns, who demotes Homer to Roz's job and gives Roz Homer's position. Roz proceeds to charm the regulars at Moe's Tavern while finding dozens of ways to make Homer's job miserable. After Ned Flanders sees Homer is depressed, Homer tells him about Roz, and is shocked to learn that Ned knew Roz back in Ohio; they were part of the same Christian group, and when Ned gave her a congratulatory hug for winning a "no-fun run" he learned that Roz cannot stand any physical contact. When Roz wins a "Worker of Millennium" award at the plant, Homer manipulates Burns into giving Roz a hug. She proceeds to beat Burns up, and is fired. Roz then compliments Homer for being much smarter than she expected, in terms Homer does not quite understand.

Elsewhere, Bart is not ready for the upcoming Springfield Elementary science fair. He ends up working with Martin Prince and after Bart comes up with a general idea—a robotic pet—Martin does all the work and constructs an adorable robotic baby seal. However, it is revealed that when the wiring is tampered with, they become violent attackers, yet the seal wins first prize at the Fair anyway. When Bart and Martin go to the Springfield Retirement Castle, the senior citizens see the seal visibly cheer up Jasper and the value of the invention becomes clear. All of the senior citizens then get their own seals, and they become happier and healthier, which angers a consortium of local businesses (led by the local funeral home) who want the oldsters to go back to being miserable and more rapidly dying. The group figures out the wiring secret and reworks the seals so their fury returns, causing the death of Mrs. Glick. Chief Wiggum has all the robots impounded. Bart and Martin enlist the aid of Professor Frink who then gets a larger group of nerds to remotely hack into the robot software and make them nice again. They succeed and as a result, Chief Wiggum releases all the seals, who return to the nursing home.

== Production ==
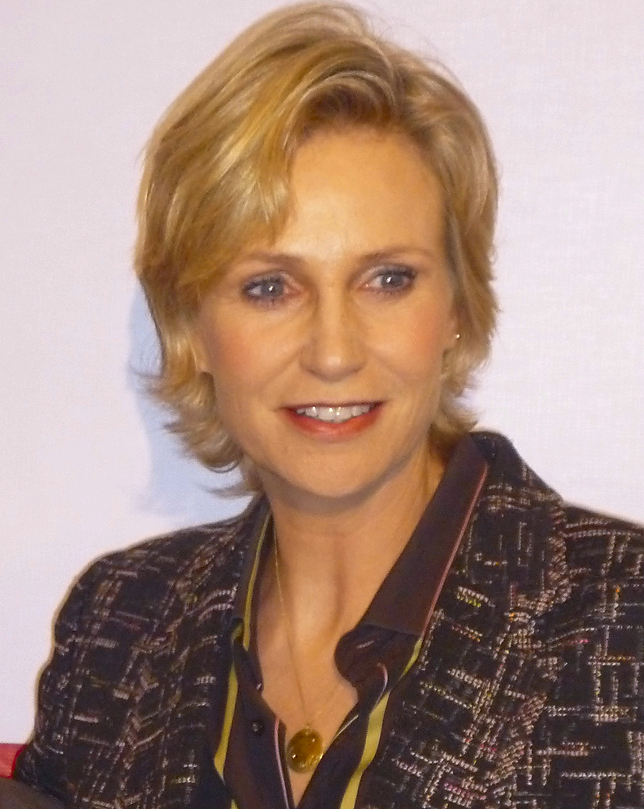
Jane Lynch guest starred in the episode as Roz.

The episode was written by Stephanie Gillis and directed by Mark Kirkland. American actress Jane Lynch guest starred in the episode as Roz. Showrunner Al Jean noted in an interview with Entertainment Weekly that it was easy to cast Lynch, since "she can do edge, sweetness, and a mix of both". He further noted that the crew was happy when she agreed to take the role, and that he was "embarrassed [the show] didn’t ask her before she was so successful because she’s funny in everything she does." Lynch recorded her scenes together with cast member Dan Castellaneta, who voices Homer. In an interview with the website Hollywood Outbreak, she commented that "It was pretty amazing to every once in a while look up at his face and go 'Oh my God, it's that guy that does that voice.'" Lynch added that she "had the best time. I would do it again and again. This is kind of very much a milestone in my career. I will point to this as a big deal." In an interview with Fox All Access, Lynch revealed that she is a longtime fan: "Indeed I am a fan of The Simpsons. I started watching twenty years ago. I remember the first season. I remember clearly moments from the episodes and I thought it was revolutionary, the comedy of it. I really loved it."

As with most episodes of The Simpsons, the music was composed by Alf Clausen and edited by Chris Ledesma. In a blog written by Ledesma, it was revealed prior to the airing of the episode that it would contain the use of the waltz "Tales from the Vienna Woods" by Johann Strauss II as well as a musical cue similar to the style of the main theme from the film Catch Me If You Can. The episode's title is a reference to the popular song "Embraceable You" which coincidentally features prominently in Catch Me If You Can also. The episode features several other references to popular culture as well. For example, Homer skips work to go see a film called Paul Flart: Water Park Cop, a parody of the 2009 film Paul Blart: Mall Cop. In addition, there is a brief shot of the character Bender from the animated television series Futurama.

== Release ==
"Replaceable You" originally aired on the Fox network in the United States on November 6, 2011. It was watched by approximately eight million people during this broadcast. In the demographic for adults aged 18–49, the episode received a 3.7 Nielsen rating (down eight percent from the previous episode) and ten percent share. The Simpsons became the highest-rated program in Fox's Animation Domination lineup that night in terms of total viewers and in the 18–49 demographic, finishing before new episodes of Family Guy, American Dad!, and Allen Gregory. For the week of October 31–November 6, "Replaceable You" finished fifteenth in the ratings among all network prime-time broadcasts in the 18–49 demographic.

=== Critical reception ===
"Replaceable You" has received mixed reviews from television critics. Josh Harrison of Ology wrote positively about the episode, giving it an eight out of ten rating. He commented: "This episode of The Simpsons swerved toward the wacky in the best possible. I approve of this bounce-back from the decidedly meh Treehouse of Horrors [the previous episode of the series—'Treehouse of Horror XXII'] and I'm looking forward to what's next." Stephanie Krikorian of The Wall Street Journal's Speakeasy publication named Lynch's appearance one of the television highlights of the week November 6–13. She wrote that "Simply put, Jane Lynch is good TV. Even the cartoon version, non-track-suit-wearing Jane Lynch was worth watching. Her role as a schemer on this week’s Simpsons was no exception, making her performance voicing Roz one of the top moments in this week’s Rewind."

The A.V. Club critic Hayden Childs was more negative, giving the episode a C− rating and criticizing the two plots and the lack of good jokes. He wrote that while there was "some comic potential" in the premise, the writers failed to deliver funny material. Commenting on the plot with Homer and Roz, Childs explained that "there’s some comic possibility and resonance in having Homer stabbed in the back at work. Many people have been stabbed in the back by an ambitious colleague. Unfortunately, Homer may not be the best character to give this sort of storyline a heart. Homer is a bad employee who deserves to be ratted out by his subordinate. The fact that she is selfish and mean doesn’t add to this story. Yes, that is the sort of person who would stab someone in the back for their own gain, but yes, Homer also had it coming. Where is the joke?"
