= Homer? A Cracker Bro? =

- The Simpsons episode
- Kirk (right) sits around miserably, as Michael Stipe (left-center) sings a parody of "Everybody Hurts". Stipe felt flattered to be invited for the role, and his outfit was based on the attire he wore in the original song's music video.
- Episode no.: Season 37; Episode 15
- Directed by: Chris Clements
- Written by: Ryan Koh
- Production code: 37ABF05
- Original air date: February 15, 2026

Guest appearance
- Michael Stipe as himself

Episode chronology
← Previous "Irrational Treasure"	Next → "Extreme Makeover: Homer Edition"
- The Simpsons season 37

"Homer? A Cracker Bro?" is the thirty-seventh broadcast season finale of the American animated television series The Simpsons. The 805th episode overall, it originally aired in the United States on the Fox Network on February 15, 2026, following "Irrational Treasure". The episode was written by Ryan Koh and directed by Chris Clements.

The series follows the dysfunctional Simpson family, consisting of patriarch Homer (Dan Castellaneta), matriarch Marge (Julie Kavner), son Bart (Nancy Cartwright), oldest daughter Lisa (Yeardley Smith), and youngest Maggie, as they live out their misadventures in the town of Springfield. In the episode, Homer and Kirk start a successful company selling crackers that do not crumble. However, Kirk, now bipolar and unmedicated, starts behaving erratically.

The episode deals with a more grounded, serious story; executive producer Matt Selman noted this as an example of how the series' loose formula allows the crew to do darker episodes, while not losing touch with the series' tone. Musician Michael Stipe appeared as himself in the episode, performing "Everybody Kirks", a parody of his band R.E.M.'s song "Everybody Hurts". Upon release, "Homer? A Cracker Bro?" received positive reviews from critics, particularly for its handling of bipolar disorder. It was nominated for Outstanding Animated Program at the 78th Primetime Creative Arts Emmy Awards, but lost to South Park.

== Plot ==
Springfield celebrates the opening of a freeway wildlife crossing proposed by Lisa, the eldest daughter of the Simpson family. The animals soon discover a pharmaceutical factory on the other side of the freeway, where they consume multiple drugs. Later, Lisa's father Homer drops his son Bart off at his friend Milhouse Van Houten's house. After rabid animals stampede down Springfield, Homer and Bart are forced to spend the night with Milhouse, along with his father Kirk and mother Luann; this upsets Homer, who dislikes Kirk. In the night, Homer reluctantly eats crackers with Kirk, a cracker factory worker, while Homer notes how many crumbs fall onto him when he eats them.

A week later, Kirk shows Homer his new invention: a cracker that does not crumble, with the two deciding to turn this into a business. They start to sell the product inside stores with samples, and it soon becomes a success. Kirk quickly becomes increasingly confident, but his behavior concerns Homer's wife, Marge. She learns from their physician Dr. Hibbert that Kirk has bipolar disorder, having run out of medication when the animals consumed it all from the factory, yet refused to take it when the supply returned. Marge discusses it with Luann, but she is not concerned with Kirk's well-being, caring much more about the family's newfound wealth. During a news interview, a manic Kirk reveals that he plans to build an aquatic rocket to transport people to the ocean floor, causing the company's stock to plummet.

Kirk enters a depressed state, and the FBI begins investigating him after he stole company money to build his rocket. Homer plans to take the blame to keep the company and Kirk's family afloat. Marge visits Kirk, who does not want to take his medication, feeling people like him without it. She asserts that she does not like him this way, and that he should take it if he cares about Homer's friendship; he agrees. Kirk uses the rocket to catch up with Homer at the FBI's waterfront headquarters, turning himself in after reconciling with Homer.

== Production ==
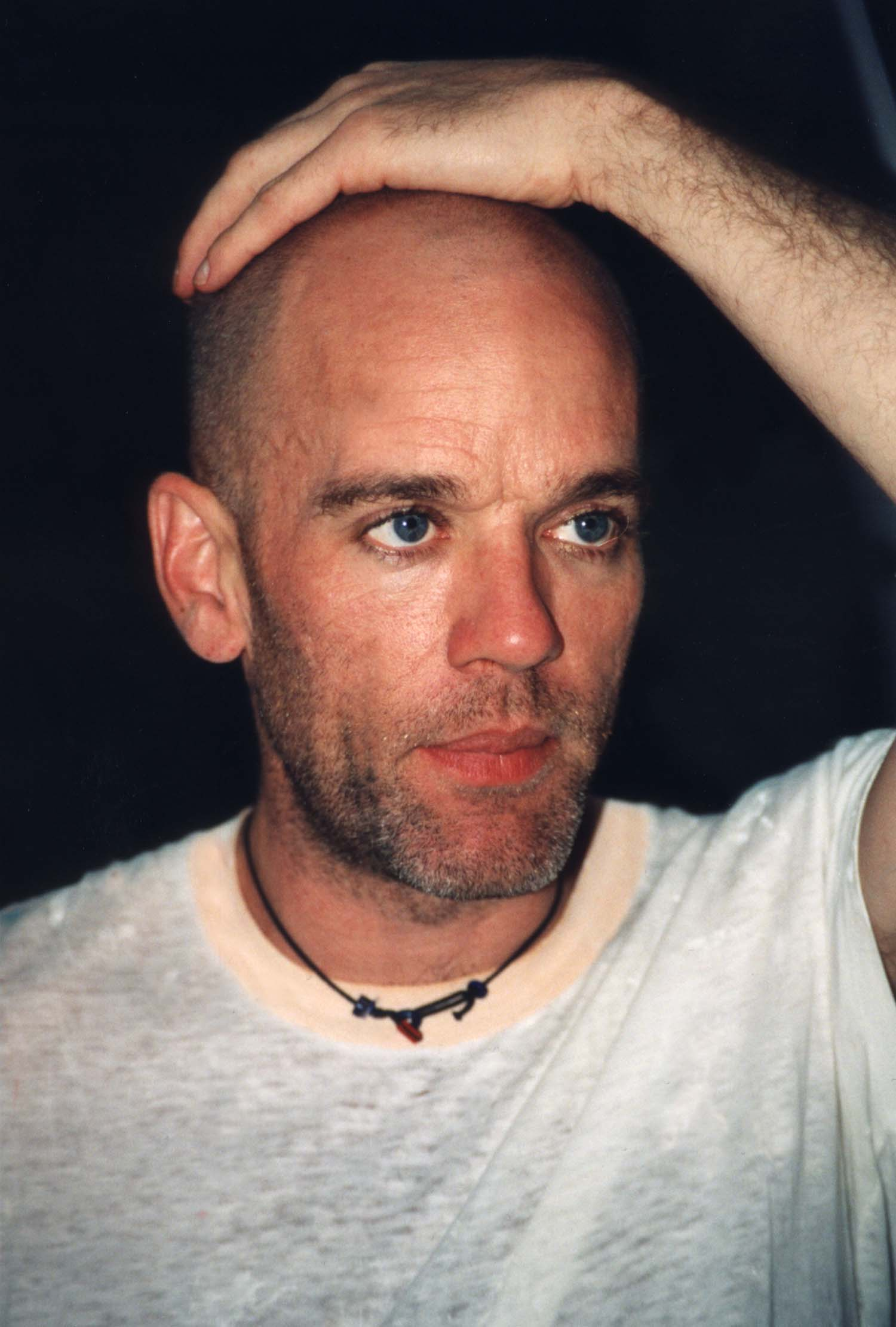
Michael Stipe guest starred in the episode.

"Homer? A Cracker Bro?" was written by co-executive producer Ryan Koh and directed by Chris Clements. Musician Michael Stipe guest starred in the episode, portraying himself. In his role, Stipe performs a parody of the song "Everybody Hurts", originally from his band R.E.M., entitled "Everybody Kirks", with his character wearing the same outfit Stipe wore in the original song's music video. R.E.M. previously appeared on the series in the thirteenth season episode "Homer the Moe", including Stipe. He later stated that he was "super flattered" to be invited back for the episode, and called it a "grand message of great hope".

According to executive producer Matt Selman, the core concept of the episode was "The Simpsons, but mental illness is real", with the crew focusing on making a story about bipolar disorder that is both comedic and "empathetic". Selman also noted the particular contrast between the more grounded tone of "Homer? A Cracker Bro?", and the more comedic, travel-focused previous episode, "Irrational Treasure". He expressed gratitude for how much the series' formula allows for such differing episodes to air right after another, yet "they're still The Simpsons".

== Release and reception ==
"Homer? A Cracker Bro?" first aired on the Fox Network at 8:30 p.m. ET on February 15, 2026, running until 9:02 p.m. It aired directly after the series' 800th episode, "Irrational Treasure", being advertised as part of a one-hour season finale. Despite being the broadcast season finale, three more special episodes of the season would air in 2026 following the premiere of "Homer? A Cracker Bro?", all released exclusively on the streaming service Disney+: "Extreme Makeover: Homer Edition" in June, "Simpsley" in July, and "Yellow Mirror" in August. In the United States, the episode was watched by a total of 1.14 million viewers during its original broadcast. It garnered a share of 0.29% among adults between the ages of 18 and 49, meaning that it was seen by 0.29% of all households in that demographic. It marked a decrease in viewership from "Irrational Treasure", which drew in 1.19 million viewers, but had a lower ratings share at 0.27%.

Billy Fellows of Collider noted that the episode for focusing on themes heavier than the series is used to, finding this to be one of its strong suits, alongside pushing a different angle to Homer's character. Fellows found the episode to be accurate in its portrayal of bipolar disorder, commending it for not shying away from showing his symptoms fully, and considered it a "perfect note" to end the season on. Nick Valdez of Comicbook.com placed "Homer? A Cracker Bro?" in the number one spot on his list ranking each episode of the season. He considered the episode's usage of Homer and Kirk's history together to drive the story to be one of its strongest aspects, highlighting a scene where the two reflect on their pasts. Finding it to be done with "a lot of care", Valdez also noted the episode for being able to deliver the season's "biggest laughs". Stipe's "surprise" cameo was well received by critics and audiences, according to The Independent's Inga Parkel, who wrote that fans expressed considerably "widespread delight and excitement" towards the scene.

The episode was nominated in the Outstanding Animated Program category at the 78th Primetime Creative Arts Emmy Awards. It ultimately lost to South Park for the episode "Sermon on the 'Mount".
