= Sashes to Sashes =

- The Simpsons episode
- Episode no.: Season 37; Episode 7
- Directed by: Mike Frank Polcino
- Written by: Ryan Koh
- Production code: 36ABF18
- Original air date: November 16, 2025

Guest appearances
- Carrie Coon as Beatrice Bouvier; Cole Escola as Devin; Brendan Gleeson as Joe Quimby Senior; Domhnall Gleeson as Young Joe Quimby Sr.

Episode chronology
← Previous "Bart 'N' Frink"	Next → "The Day of the Jack-up"
- The Simpsons season 37

"Sashes to Sashes" is the seventh episode of the thirty-seventh season of the American animated television series The Simpsons, and the 797th episode overall. It aired on Fox in the United States on November 16, 2025. The episode was written by Ryan Koh and directed by Mike Frank Polcino.

In this episode, Bart runs for student council president with Lisa's help against Joe Quimby III while flashbacks show the history of the Quimby family. Carrie Coon, Cole Escola, Brendan Gleeson, and Domhnall Gleeson are billed as "Special Guest Stars". The title is a spoof of the idiom "ashes to ashes". The episode received mixed reviews.

== Plot ==
Alice Glick dies and leaves her estate to Springfield Elementary School to fund its music program. Joe Quimby III proposes a music festival instead if he is elected student council president. Annoyed, Lisa wants to run against him, but Devin suggests she campaign for Bart, who is more popular. She convinces Bart to run by saying he can annoy Skinner if he wins. Flashbacks to 1921 show Joseph O'Shaughnessy of Quimby, Ireland, stealing his family's turnip and escaping to the United States where he is renamed Joe Quimby. In 1929, Quimby searches manure to find items of value because no one will hire an Irishman. When he asks the owner of a barrel factory for a job and is rejected, Quimby kills him and leaves a note that gives Quimby ownership of the factory. He becomes rich but is humiliated when he wants to run for political office, so he vows to make his son politically successful.

Lisa learns Mayor Quimby married Marge's Aunt Beatrice with young Marge as a flower girl, but Marge refuses to talk about her. Bart campaigns evenly with Quimby III, but he loses the election. In 1982, Joe Quimby Jr. runs for mayor by catering to the rich although he is only doing it for his father. He meets Beatrice, who says he must meet with working-class people, and he is elected with her help. They fall in love. At their wedding, Quimby Sr. tells Mayor Quimby he must have mistresses to attain higher office. Although Quimby says he will only pretend to have affairs, Beatrice leaves him, which saddens a young Marge.

In 1983, Mayor Quimby runs for governor. At a debate, Quimby professes his love for Beatrice and confesses he is not having affairs. This ruins his campaign and causes his father to have a heart attack. On his deathbed, Quimby Sr. says Mayor Quimby has shamed his family and tells him to have a son to succeed where he failed. In the present, Quimby III tells Lisa his father wants her to help him. Lisa and Marge meet Beatrice, who apologizes to Marge and explains what happened. She forgives Beatrice. Lisa writes Quimby III a speech where he says his family has been chasing ambition, but he refuses to participate and resigns while supporting Bart as the student council president. Superintendent Chalmers states that because of Quimby III's resignation, hall monitor Martin Prince is now the new student council president due to its line of succession. Martin states that he will fund the music program. Quimby III apologizes to Mayor Quimby, who says he is proud of him. The music program starts to perform a song.

During the credits, still shots of certain scenes are shown.

== Production ==
Co-executive producer Tim Long confirmed that the character Alice Glick was permanently dead. However, she was already previously killed in an earlier episode. The music video played over the end credits features music from The Hood Internet. Carrie Coon guest starred as Woman/Beatrice, Cole Escola guest starred as Devin, Brendan Gleeson guest starred as Joe Quimby Senior, and Domhnall Gleeson guest starred as Young Joe Quimby Sr.

== Cultural references ==
The episode title refers to the term "Ashes to Ashes," a common prayer used in Christian funeral services. The flashback narrative style is a parody of the same style from the 1974 film The Godfather Part II.

== Reception ==
=== Viewing figures ===
The episode earned a 0.23 rating and was watched by 0.89 million viewers, which was the most-watched show on Fox that night.

=== Critical response ===
Marcus Gibson of Bubbleblabber gave the episode a 7.5 out of 10. He liked the narrative structure of the flashbacks showing the Quimby family history while also showing its involvement with the Simpsons family. Mike Celestino of Laughing Place did not like the episode due its lack of jokes and repeated storyline of running for class president. However, he liked the examination of the Quimby family. Marisa Roffman of Give Me My Remote liked using the Quimby family as part of the class president story. However, she would have liked to have more spacing between flashback episodes after "Bad Boys... for Life?" two episodes earlier.

Nick Valdez of ComicBook.com highlighted the death of the character Alice Glick at the beginning of the episode, which sets the main plot in motion. The character first appeared in "Three Men and a Comic Book" from season two and has since died in various ways, such as in the season 23 episode "Replaceable You." He concluded that "It was a quick and sudden death, without much consequence, so it remains to be seen whether Glick will stay dead in future episodes. The fact that she has reappeared several times since her last death seems to indicate that she will, so fans will have to stay tuned to see if this death is permanent." Cathal Gunning of Screen Rant said that her death was final according to executive producer Tim Long and concluded that "Alice's final death implies that The Simpsons seem determined to keep their characters dead, regardless of how long they've appeared on the show."

Valdez also highlighted the inclusion of the new character Beatrice, who is part of Marge's family. Beatrice married Quimby, but they divorced because he was pressured by his father to be unfaithful in public. Furthermore, she broke Marge's heart when she was four years old by telling her that princesses and love don't exist. Valdez concluded, "This probably means we won't see this character again, except perhaps at key moments for the family, especially now that her story with Marge has ended. Even so, it's a brilliant debut." Tom Phillips of IGN said that the character probably won't reappear since, as executive producer Matt Selman stated in June, "there is no canon" in the series, after people believed that Marge had died in "Estranger Things".

Nick Valdez of Comicbook.com ranked the episode 11th on his list, "All Episodes of The Simpsons Season 37, Ranked Worst to Best." He said, "It may not be the funniest episode of the season, but it ranks so high on the list because of what it contributes to the show's status quo, as fans have never seen a flashback like this before. It accomplishes a lot in its short runtime."
