= Treehouse of Horror XXXVI =

- The Simpsons episode
- Promotional poster for the episode
- Episode no.: Season 37; Episode 3
- Directed by: Matthew Faughnan
- Written by: "The Last Days of Crisco": Broti Gupta; "Clown Night with the Devil": Michael Price; "Plastic World": Dan Greaney
- Production code: 36ABF15
- Original air date: October 19, 2025

Guest appearances
- Ike Barinholtz as Wayne the Grip; Viola Davis as the Plastic World Narrator/Plastic Maggie Simpson; Idris Elba as the Devil; Matt Groening as himself; Michael Keaton as Hal Julian

Episode chronology
← Previous "Keep Chalm and Gary On"	Next → "Men Behaving Manly"
- The Simpsons season 37

"Treehouse of Horror XXXVI" is the third episode of the thirty-seventh season of the American animated television series The Simpsons, and the 793rd episode overall. It aired in the United States on Fox on October 19, 2025. The episode was written by Broti Gupta, Michael Price, and Dan Greaney and directed by Matthew Faughnan.

In this episode, a fatberg hunts for fat in Springfield, footage is revealed from an old Krusty special, and humans search for food in an apocalyptic future. Ike Barinholtz, Viola Davis, Idris Elba, and Michael Keaton guest starred. Matt Groening appeared as himself. The episode received positive reviews.

== Plot ==
=== "America the Beautiful" ===
Afraid of the current political issues, an American family decides to watch The Simpsons for comfort as Matt Groening menacingly watches them from the window of their home.

=== "The Last Days of Crisco" ===
Investigating the theft of grease from the doughnut shop in this parody of The Blob and Jaws, Chief Wiggum is dragged down a sink drain by a tentacle of fat and killed. Officer Lou is appointed chief of police and continues investigating with Moe, who says the fat that residents pour down the drain has consolidated into a fatberg that is hunting for more grease. Lou wants to cancel the state fair, which sells fried foods, but Homer, who owns a grease factory, convinces Mayor Quimby to fire Lou to keep the state fair open. The fatberg attacks the fair and kills many residents including Bart. Homer tries to kill it, but it eats Homer which causes it to die because it could not handle the amount of fat in Homer.

=== "Clown Night with the Devil" ===
On Halloween 1995 in this parody of Late Night with the Devil, Krusty the Clown hosts a live television special. Mr. Teeny becomes possessed by Satan and chews off Sideshow Mel's face. The crew kills Teeny, but Satan transfers to Ralph. He emerges from Ralph's body and starts killing the audience. He has come to collect on a deal that Bart made with him to eliminate Krusty's competing shows. The undead from those shows try to take Krusty to Hell. Bart tells Satan to take him instead and he agrees to the deal. In the present, Krusty tries to sell the footage to Netflix executives, who are skeptical of the concept, which disappoints Krusty and Satan.

=== "Plastic World" ===
In a parody of Waterworld with elements of the Mad Max franchise, the narrator states that an asteroid killed the dinosaurs. They turned into oil and oil soon turned into plastic. Earth became overwhelmed by discarded plastic and has become buried in plastic waste.

The human survivors fight each other for food. Lisa, who lost her family in a plastic avalanche, proposes digging through the plastic in search of dirt to plant crops for food. Lisa and her followers fall through the plastic tunnels and discover the Kwik-E-Mart, which contains preserved food. They are attacked by another faction led by Bart, who survived the avalanche, to take the food. At one point, Bart called Lisa by the name of "Fugliosa".

When they hear Homer and Marge outside, they discover that their parents fell into nuclear waste and became plastic people (Homer being identitical to 3D Homer in Treehouse of Horror VI) that can eat other plastic. The Plastic People attack the humans to try to turn them into plastic people. The humans use fire to melt the plastic people. Homer and Marge are sucked into the Squishee machine, which combines them into a plastic Maggie. Lisa and Bart decide that Maggie is the future. The narrator is revealed to be Plastic Maggie, who tells her fellow Plastic Maggies that the world becomes filled with Plastic Maggies as the remaining humans eventually die. The Plastic Maggies lived in a perfect world, Maggieworld.

During the credits, the camera pulls away from the plastic figures of the different characters as Joey Ramone's cover of "What a Wonderful World" is heard.

== Production ==
=== Development ===
The opening segment was created by guest animator Stan Kelly of The Onion. Kelly made six different suggestions for the segment, which all involved political content. He worked with The Simpsons producers via video conferencing and email, but worked primarily with writer Michael Price. He did not meet the creative team until the 2025 San Diego Comic-Con.

Writer and co-showrunner Michael Price said the main segments have a theme of a chronological progression with environmentalism elements. The first segment was written by Broti Gupta. The idea came from co-executive producer Jeff Westbrook, who read about fatbergs clogging sewer systems. Executive producer Matt Selman suggested the idea of something pulling a person down a pipe from the 1988 remake of The Blob, which became the fate of Chief Wiggum. Lou's character was selected to be a parody of Chief Brody from the 1975 film Jaws. Price wrote the second segment. Selman suggested using Bart be the one who made the deal with Satan. Dan Greaney wrote the final segment, which came from an idea that Selman previously had. The 3D animation was handled by Xentrix Studios. The final segment also referenced the first two segments by showing lard containers from the first segment and plastic pumpkins from the second segment.

=== Casting ===
Ike Barinholtz guest starred as Wayne the Grip. Viola Davis guest starred as the Narrator. Davis' casting came after a joke was written in the segment involving Milhouse finding a magazine with Viola Davis on the cover, and the creative team suggested casting Davis. Idris Elba guest starred as the Devil. Someone from the creative team suggested Elba for the role, and he recorded his lines in London. Michael Keaton guest starred as Hal Julian. The creative team was looking for someone for the producer who is like Keaton's character from the 1982 film Night Shift, so they decided to ask Keaton who previously guest starred in the twelfth season episode "Pokey Mom" as a different character. Series creator Matt Groening appeared as himself in the opening segment.

== Cultural references ==
The first segment is a combination of parodies of the 1975 film Jaws, the 1958 film The Blob, and its 1988 remake. The second segment is a parody of the 2023 film Late Night with the Devil. The final segment is a combination of parodies of the 1995 film Waterworld and the Mad Max media franchise, including the 2024 film Furiosa: A Mad Max Saga (where Bart called Lisa "Fugliosa"). The couch gag references the Painful Procedural skit from The Onion.

== Reception ==
=== Viewing figures ===
Leading out of an NFL doubleheader, the episode earned a 1.06 rating and was watched by 4.08 million viewers, which was the most-watched show on Fox that night.

=== Critical response ===
Marcus Gibson of Bubbleblabber gave the episode a 7.5 out of 10. He thought the first segment was the weakest, but he highlighted the animation in the final two segments and voice acting of Idris Elba and Viola Davis. Mike Celestino of Laughing Place liked the voice acting and animation of the segments. He highlighted the combination of 2D and 3D animation in the final segment. Daniel Kurland of Bloody Disgusting gave the episode a 3 out of 5. He thought the first segment was "strong" but thought the plot did not make sense. He liked the second segment the most and said it was "somewhat disturbing with some of its brutality." He thought the final segment was not as scary, but liked the plastic animation.

Marisa Roffman of Give Me My Remote also highlighted the animation and liked the voice acting of Viola Davis as the narrating Maggie. Nick Valdez of Comicbook.com called it the "best Treehouse of Horror in years." He praised the segments for being gorier than other specials, concluding, "All three segments were strong and had a notable foundation of horror, and it's definitely something you should check out this Halloween if you missed it, because the creative team really went all out this year." JM McNab of Cracked.com noted that the Kwik-E-Mart was shown again in the third segment, "Plastic World." He noted that the location was no longer used in the series after Apu Nahasapeemapetilon was removed due to the controversial 2017 documentary The Problem with Apu. Nick Valdez of Comicbook.com ranked the episode number 2 on his list, "All Episodes of The Simpsons Season 37, Ranked Worst to Best." He said, "It's so good it surpasses many average episodes, which is saying a lot considering the excellent character development we've seen throughout this season."
