= Guess Who's Coming to Skinner =

- The Simpsons episode
- Episode no.: Season 37; Episode 10
- Directed by: Rob Oliver
- Written by: John Frink
- Production code: 37ABF04
- Original air date: December 7, 2025

Guest appearances
- Kieran Culkin as Alexander "Hub" Hubley; Karen Gillan as Maisie MacWeldon-MacDougal; Kurtwood Smith as Mr. Hubley; Barry Sonnenfeld as Phillip Ho-Hum; Kerry Washington as Rayshelle Peyton

Episode chronology
← Previous "Aunt Misbehavin'"	Next → "Parahormonal Activity"
- The Simpsons season 37

"Guess Who's Coming to Skinner" is the tenth episode of the thirty-seventh season of the American animated television series The Simpsons. It is the 800th episode to air. (Note: Multiple episodes are considered the 800th episode. See The Simpsons season 37 § 800th episode for further details.) It aired in the United States on Fox on December 7, 2025. The episode was written by John Frink and directed by Rob Oliver.

In this episode, Principal Skinner finds a boy living in the school library and begins to take care of him. It features special guest voice-overs from Kieran Culkin, Karen Gillan, Kurtwood Smith, Barry Sonnenfeld, and Kerry Washington. The episode received positive reviews.

== Plot ==
Bart's class is on a field trip to a Victorian textile museum chaperoned by Principal Skinner. While Skinner flirts with the docent, Bart finds a room full of snow globes, which results in the class throwing snow globes at each other and Bart injuring Skinner's eye.

After healing in the hospital, Skinner returns to work on the day before spring break to berate Homer and Marge for being terrible parents. They plead for him to understand them from a parent's perspective, but he is unsympathetic. When Agnes leaves with Jasper for Atlantic City for a month, Skinner returns to the school at night to do paperwork. When he hears a noise, he and Groundskeeper Willie find a boy in the library. He says he is a ghost which causes Willie to run, but Skinner realizes he has been living there to his embarrassment.

Skinner recognizes the boy as Alexander "Hub" Hubley and deduces he has been pretending to be a student to live at the school. Superintendent Chalmers tells Skinner to watch over him until his parents are located so they do not get into trouble. Unable to control Hub, Skinner asks Homer and Marge for help. After laughing at the irony, they give him some conflicting advice. At the mall to get Hub clothes for school, he escapes and nearly drowns in a ball pit until Skinner rescues him. They start to bond. After school resumes, Skinner forces a reluctant Hub to audition for the school musical about Peter Rabbit. Hub earns a minor role as Mr. McGregor and hugs Skinner for helping him.

Unsatisfied with Hub's role, Skinner tells Lisa to rewrite the play to make him the star, and has Willie hang banners of the school musical featuring Hub all over town. At a parent-teacher conference, he becomes defensive when hearing some of Hub's weaknesses. Realizing he is not Hub's parent, he decides to adopt him.

On opening night, Hub becomes nervous seeing the audience. When he sees Skinner's adoption application, he runs away. When Skinner tells him to come back, Hub turns around and sees his own parents who saw him on the banners. Hub had run away from boarding school and settled in Springfield. They take him home, which saddens Skinner. Before he leaves, Hub performs a monologue thanking Skinner for helping him, which makes Skinner and Mr. Hubley tearfully proud.

== Production ==
The plot came from an idea that writer John Frink had about Principal Skinner being a parent. The snow globe fight came from an idea that executive producer Matt Selman had after producer Michael Price received a snow globe of the Fox studio lot during a writers room Christmas gift exchange.

Kieran Culkin guest starred as Hub. Hub already appeared as a background character in the thirty-sixth season episode "Estranger Things". Karen Gillan guest starred as Maisie MacWeldon-MacDougal. Gillan reprised her role from the thirty-fifth season episode "Ae Bonny Romance". Kurtwood Smith guest starred as Hub's Dad. Smith's role is a reference to his role in the 1989 film Dead Poets Society. Barry Sonnenfeld guest starred as Mr. Ho-Hum. Sonnenfeld was cast because the creative team enjoyed his narration of the audiobook versions of his memoirs. Kerry Washington guest starred as Rayshelle Peyton.

== Cultural references ==
The episode title is a play on words with the title of the 1967 film Guess Who's Coming to Dinner.

== Reception ==
Marcus Gibson of Bubbleblabber gave the episode an 8 out of 10. He highlighted the performance of Kieran Culkin and plot that was designed to make the audience feel good. He also liked the multiple jokes involving Skinner's eye becoming a snow globe. Mike Celestino of Laughing Place thought the episode "was kind of a miss for me" other than a few jokes he liked. Although he liked the emotional plot, he did not think it was believable. Marisa Roffman of Give Me My Remote thought it was as a "very, very sweet episode" and liked seeing Skinner as a parent.

JM McNab of Cracked.com highlighted the fact that the episode gets its revenge on Lenny Leonard and the recurring joke about his eye injury in season 10, specifically in the scene where Skinner goes to the Eye Trauma Center. He concluded: "It's a good way to get back at Lenny for a decade of jokes about his eye. And, given that the nuclear plant doesn't seem to offer the best health insurance, it's quite possible that these frequent injuries are the reason Lenny is practically destitute." Nick Valdez of ComicBook.com appreciated the fact that Willie was still married to Maisie MacDougal, who first appeared in the season 35 episode "Ae Bonny Romance".

Nick Valdez of Comicbook.com ranked the episode number 9 on his list, "All Episodes of The Simpsons Season 37, Ranked Worst to Best." He said, "The ending isn't what you'd expect, but it's the first time we've seen Skinner up close like this in a long time. It's a fun, lighthearted moment, and it helps in this era where Skinner has taken a backseat compared to before."
