= Frinkiac =

Fan-made Simpsons search engine

- Home page
- Creators: Paul Kehrer, Sean Schulte, Allie Young
- Website: www.frinkiac.com
- Commercial: No
- Registration: No
- Launched: February 2, 2016
- Written in: Go

Frinkiac is a website for users to search for words or phrases from episodes of the American animated sitcom The Simpsons. It returns screenshots related to the search terms, from which it generates memes and animated GIFs. Created by Paul Kehrer, Sean Schulte and Allie Young, the site is named after a computer built by one of the show's recurring characters, Professor Frink. The site was critically acclaimed upon its launch, and Newsweek wrote: "It may be the greatest feat of Internet engineering we've ever seen". As of May 2026, screenshots from all thirty-seven seasons of The Simpsons are in Frinkiac's database.

On August 8, 2016, the developers debuted Morbotron, a similar website for Futurama. It was followed by Master of All Science, a Rick and Morty site in the same mold, on July 30, 2017.

== Development history ==
Paul Kehrer and Sean Schulte had the idea of a search engine for screenshots of The Simpsons based on quotes from the show for several years. The two often communicated using lines from the series while at work and it was very hard for them to find screenshots related to the quotes on Google. Development of Frinkiac began around August 2015. Most of Frinkiac's code, written with the Go language in a week, determines which screenshot frame is most pertinent to the search term by cutting each scene into 100 buckets of matching size amount. The standard color of each bucket is then used to compare it with a frame of the bucket in the previous frame and the image is saved if these two buckets are different enough. In addition to parsing episode video files with ffmpeg and cgo, the code also analyzes subtitle files, matching the timecodes of the subtitles and the screenshots.

After a few weeks with Allie Young creating the user interface, the three people involved in making Frinkiac tested it with their relatives but didn't launch it for public use until February 2, 2016, starting with almost three million screenshots from episodes of the show's first fifteen seasons. On May 15, 2016, Frinkiac was updated with the addition of 201,877 screenshots and 21,444 subtitles for episodes from the sixteenth and seventeenth seasons of The Simpsons. The GIF loop time limit was also increased to seven seconds, because, as Kehrer joked: "it was derived from my desire to see Grandpa walk in circles at the burlesque house entrance". Kehrer also announced some features for the site that were in the works, such as mp4 and WebMs support for GIF files, conversion of subtitles into other languages, the ability to control the font and font size of the text in a meme image, and a showcase of Simpsons screenshots and memes. In a February 2016 interview, Kehrer said that he'd liked to include more complex search parameters to find well-known screenshots of scenes that don't have much dialogue.

In May 2026, there was a major update to the site, adding new improvements to the site, which adds seasons eighteen through thirty-seven to keep the show up to date.

== Reception ==
Frinkiac garnered critical acclaim upon its launch. A Newsweek journalist who called Frinkiac a "brilliantly designed and mind-blowingly comprehensive search engine", wrote that it "may be the greatest feat of Internet engineering we've ever seen". An Engadget writer said: "As someone who references The Simpsons dozens of times a day, Frinkiac [...] is practically a godsend. Its search function is far faster than sifting through Google images, and the ability to find specific moments during scenes is particularly helpful."

Marie Boran of The Irish Times praised the site's use of the Simpsons font for the text of meme images. When reviewing the site upon its February 2016 launch, Hannah Hawkins writing for Junkee, supported Frinkiac's inclusion of only episodes from the first fifteen seasons, saying "there's no chance of any awful unfunny jokes appearing on your screen". The May 2016 addition of the GIF feature was also significantly praised by journalists.

As CNET's Claire Reilly wrote, "a million poets could try for a million years and still describe but three-eighths of its beauty". Two of The Simpsons' showrunners, Bill Oakley and Josh Weinstein, have used Frinkiac on a regular basis for Twitter posts.
