= The Day of the Jack-up =

- The Simpsons episode
- Episode no.: Season 37; Episode 8
- Directed by: Mike Frank Polcino
- Written by: Joel H. Cohen
- Production code: 37ABF01
- Original air date: November 23, 2025

Guest appearance
- Paget Brewster as FBI Profiler

Episode chronology
← Previous "Sashes to Sashes"	Next → "Aunt Misbehavin'"
- The Simpsons season 37

"The Day of the Jack-up" is the eighth episode of the thirty-seventh season of the American animated television series The Simpsons, and the 798th episode overall. It aired in the United States on Fox on November 23, 2025. The episode was written by Joel H. Cohen and directed by Mike Frank Polcino. In this episode that contains elements of Trap and Operation Flagship, Homer tries to find tickets for a concert while an FBI profiler hunts for the person who bought all the tickets. Paget Brewster is credited as "Special Guest Voice". The episode received mixed reviews.

== Plot ==
When the Springfield Power Plant generates excess power due to renewable energy sources, Mr. Burns tries to sell it to a cryptocurrency miner but fails. Waylon Smithers suggests building a spherical concert venue with a bright exterior display to use the power and profiting from merchandise and parking fees. The first act to perform is Kneesock Dolls, a K-pop band. Lisa Simpson begs Homer Simpson to go and he relents. When the tickets are released online, they immediately sell out and Homer cannot buy them. He attempts to buy them on the secondary market, but they are all being sold by the user SeatMiser at a price that Homer cannot afford. Lisa is disappointed, but Homer vows to get tickets.

Learning SeatMiser bought the tickets to all events at the concert venue, Mayor Quimby calls an FBI criminal profiler to find SeatMiser. Angered that Lisa thinks Homer cannot get tickets, he tries to damage the concert venue. Otto gets his attention and sells him four tickets for a cheaper price. Lisa is ecstatic. Bart Simpson decides to go only to hate-watch it.

At the concert, Bart is quickly bored, so he leaves to explore the venue. Seeing all the security guards, he learns the concert is a trap by the profiler to catch SeatMiser because she believes the user will be there. Bart's phone receives a notification of more tickets sold, revealing that he is SeatMiser. Bart steals a radio to evade the police. The profiler buys tickets to use the transaction to locate the suspect's phone. Bart puts the phone in a toilet and returns to the concert.

When it ends, the adults and children are separated as they exit. The profiler recovers the phone, dries it in a bag of rice, and plans to scan each child's face to see which one unlocks it. Lisa tells Bart she knows he is SeatMiser, but he denies it. She speculates he used an artificial intelligence chatbot to write a computer program to buy all the tickets. She also believes he sold tickets to Otto so they could see the concert as a family because he secretly likes the music. The profiler thinks she has caught Bart, but his face does not unlock the phone.

Outside, Lisa apologizes to Bart who says he does not use his face to unlock his phone. Lisa sees Bart's buttocks on the exterior display, whose control room Bart visited earlier, and realizes his buttocks unlocks the phone. The final shot shows Bart's phone unlocking in the presence of the buttocks footage.

During the credits, there is a side-by-side shot of a Kneesock Dolls performance with the left side showing a motion-capture performance and the right side showing the actual performance.

== Production ==
The dancing of the K-pop band was done by motion capture. Paget Brewster guest starred as Profiler.

== Cultural references ==
The episode title is a reference to the 1971 political thriller novel The Day of the Jackal and its 1973 film adaptation. The section of the plot where Bart tries to evade the FBI is a parody of the 2024 film Trap. The concert venue is a reference to the Sphere arena in Las Vegas. Also, the Kneesock Dolls are a parody of the band Huntrix from the film KPop Demon Hunters, while at one point, one of the projections of the Spherus shows Sussie the six-eyed magpie from such movie, who appears alongside Blinky the three-eyed fish.

== Release ==
The episode aired simultaneously in the United States in all time zones at 8:31 PM ET/5:31 PM PT following a special episode of the television series Universal Basic Guys.

== Reception ==
=== Viewing figures ===
The episode earned a 0.67 rating and was watched by 2.46 million viewers, which was the second-most watched show on Fox that night.

=== Critical response ===
Marcus Gibson of Bubbleblabber gave the episode a 6 out of 10. He preferred the earlier episodes of the season focusing on Bart but liked the K-pop motion capture performance. He also preferred the jokes in the first act over the Trap parody in the last act. Mike Celestino of Laughing Place liked the jokes and the plot structure. He highlighted the plot's parody of Trap. Marisa Roffman of Give Me My Remote also enjoyed the Trap parody and the animation of the concert performance.

Nick Valdez of ComicBook.com praised the parody of Trap, saying the episode's ending was "much better than the original movie." He concluded, "This gives Bart a much better and more concise storyline, which not only allows him to be sloppy, like Cooper in Trap, but also eliminates the silliness of the original." Lloyd Farley of Collider said the parody was "The episode is so similar to the movie that, for someone who hasn't seen it, it sparks interest in watching Trap. But if you're a serial killer, you'd better hold off: an FBI profiler could gain access to your Prime Video account."

JM McNab of Cracked.com considered the episode the "best episode of the season," stating that "it worked so well because it really managed to comment on a number of contemporary issues in a creative and fresh way, unlike other shows produced by Matt Groening." He praised the Burns joke, saying, "It's a funny gag that recalls classic formal experiments like Homer's dictionary entry in 'Homer Defined.'" Nick Valdez of Comicbook.com ranked the episode 15th on his list "All Episodes of The Simpsons Season 37, Ranked Worst to Best." He said, "It's a fun episode for Bart, and while it doesn't offer anything truly special compared to its predecessor, it does have some funny visuals thanks to the way it chooses to end. It's a fun tale of Bart getting into mischief."
