= Bart 'N' Frink =

- The Simpsons episode
- Episode no.: Season 37; Episode 6
- Directed by: Rob Oliver
- Written by: Brian Kelley
- Production code: 36ABF16
- Original air date: November 9, 2025

Guest appearances
- Glenn Howerton as Peter Linz; Danny Pudi as Johnson Bryans

Episode chronology
← Previous "Bad Boys... for Life?"	Next → "Sashes to Sashes"
- The Simpsons season 37

"Bart 'N' Frink" is the sixth episode of the thirty-seventh season of the American animated television series The Simpsons, and the 796th episode overall. It aired in the United States on Fox on November 9, 2025. The episode was written by Brian Kelley and directed by Rob Oliver.

In this episode, Bart becomes Professor Frink's assistant, and the Simpsons accompany Frink to his college reunion. Maggie Simpson does not appear in the episode, which has no couch gag. Glenn Howerton and Danny Pudi are billed as "Special Guest Voices". The episode received positive reviews.

== Plot ==
At a game store, Bart takes Martin's place at a table-top role-playing game. The players retreat from a dragon, but Bart chooses to attack to kill Martin's character. Professor Frink defends Martin's character when it is damaged. His character is killed, causing Frink to cry.

Later, Marge takes Bart to Frink's house to apologize. Bart is impressed with Frink's inventions and is relieved Frink is not upset at Bart. Marge asks if Bart can be Frink's assistant to channel his enthusiasm, and they agree. The two bond as Frink makes inventions. When Bart says he is not going to college because he is dumb, Frink says he is not. When Frink receives an invitation to his college reunion at a billionaire's compound, he invites the Simpsons to come along.

At the compound, they are greeted by Frink's classmate Peter and see his classmates are all rich. Lisa is disgusted by the billionaires' behavior. Homer tells her to have them fund her college education, but she is unsuccessful. Homer dislikes the billionaires' attempts to extend their lives, but Homer agrees to a blood test to please Marge. The test shows Homer is the equivalent of a 26-year-old, so the billionaires start copying Homer's lifestyle. Bart learns Peter used one of Frink's college inventions to make his fortune. Unable to socialize, Frink wears glasses to read people's emotions, which interests Peter as it could be a tool for neurodiverse people. Bart warns Frink, but he is uninterested, so Bart provokes him. Frink responds that Bart is smart but calls himself dumb so he does not need to apply himself and possibly fail, which upsets him.

The billionaires become sick following Homer's diet, but he forces them to continue. Lisa reveals Homer obviously cheated on the blood test. He admits he used Bart's blood, which horrifies the billionaires who start exercising to get healthy. Peter asks Bart to steal the schematics for the glasses for revenge. He draws the schematics from memory. When an exercising billionaire accidentally releases a Komodo dragon that attacks Bart, Frink subdues it. Bart gives the schematics to Frink and asks for forgiveness. Frink is proud and impressed that Bart's memory shows he is smart, which delights Marge. Frink decides to donate the glasses to his college in exchange for a scholarship for Bart, which angers Lisa.

The Simpsons and Frink leave the location whose name is bleeped with souvenirs. When Frink mentions the name New Zealand which the Simpsons gasp at, Frink states that he didn't sign the NDA. The Simpson and Frink then head back to Springfield in an airplane.

During the credits, Frink invents a device to read the Komodo dragon's thoughts which are intelligent. It proposes eating Bart with Frink.

== Production ==
Glenn Howerton guest starred as Peter Linz, and Danny Pudi guest starred as Johnson Bryans.

== Release ==
The episode aired simultaneously in the United States in all time zones at 8:31 PM ET/5:31 PM PT following a special episode of the television series Universal Basic Guys.

== Cultural references ==
The episode title is a reference to the Coen brothers' dark comedy film Barton Fink (1991). In one scene of the episode we see Bart and Frink playing a game of Dungeons & Dragons.

== Reception ==
=== Viewing figures ===
The episode earned a 0.51 rating and was watched by 1.99 million viewers, which was the second-most watched show on Fox that night.

=== Critical response ===
Marcus Gibson of Bubbleblabber gave the episode an 8 out of 10. He liked the pairing of Bart and Frink and the examination of the lifestyle of billionaires. He also liked the character development of Bart as someone smarter than he appears. Mike Celestino of Laughing Place also liked the Bart and Frink pairing. He highlighted Marge's fantasy sequence of Homer's extended life. Marisa Roffman of Give Me My Remote liked how Homer fools the billionaires instead of having the same condition as Mr. Burns as depicted in eleventh season episode "The Mansion Family". She also liked the Sadgasm easter egg from nineteenth season episode "That '90s Show".

Nick Valdez of ComicBook.com praised the chemistry between Bart and Frink in the episode, despite their previous interactions in "Future-Drama," "Bart's Brain," and the Treehouse of Horror specials. He said, "A strong bond forms between them, as Frink not only deeply respects Bart but also recognizes his intelligence. He even prevents Bart from thinking he's stupid and encourages him not to suppress his true genius. In turn, Bart helps Frink become more sociable." Valdez also praised the episode for redeeming "one of its worst retroactive changes" by showing Frink in college alongside the Sadgasm poster from the "That '90s Show" episode, saying, "This makes the previous continuity change easier to accept, because while the initial shock of moving Homer and Marge's story to the '90s was hard to swallow, it's clear there's much more to explore."

Cathal Gunning of Screen Rant praised Bart's return to the spotlight in this episode and the two previous ones, "Men Behaving Manly" and "Bad Boys... for Life?", and said that more episodes focused on him would follow seasons 33 and 34. He concluded that "However, The Simpsons still tends to devote entire episodes to irrelevant supporting characters, such as Superintendent Chalmers, rather than prioritizing its main characters in each new episode. Thankfully, the more recent episodes of The Simpsons' 37th season finally acknowledged Bart's pivotal role in the show." JM McNab of Cracked.com considers Peter Linz "the worst character" due to his actions, such as exploiting the original inhabitants and stealing Frink's inventions to enrich himself. He concludes that "and we can all be glad that The Simpsons is now exposing how terrible the billionaire class is, instead of glorifying its elite members."

Caron Copek of Stuff pointed out that the name of New Zealand was censored in the episode, and that the island was designed to resemble Queenstown. He concluded that this was due to the show's popularity in the country, similar to how a giant pink donut was placed on Aotearoa in 2007 to promote The Simpsons Movie. Nick Valdez of Comicbook.com ranked the episode number 6 on his list "Every Episode of The Simpsons Season 37, Ranked Worst to Best." He said, "Their friendship strengthens them both, and they make such a fun pair that the show should revisit this dynamic someday. There's definitely a lot of potential that's only been explored in this one episode."
