= The Boy Who Knew Too Much (The Simpsons) =

- The Simpsons episode
- Bart overhearing the conversation between Freddy and the waiter in the kitchen.
- Episode no.: Season 5 Episode 20
- Directed by: Jeffrey Lynch
- Written by: John Swartzwelder
- Production code: 1F19
- Original air date: May 5, 1994

Guest appearance
- Phil Hartman as Lionel Hutz

Episode features
- Chalkboard gag: "There are plenty of businesses like show business"
- Couch gag: The Simpsons sit on the couch and find themselves on the set of the Late Show with David Letterman.
- Commentary: Matt Groening; David Mirkin; David Silverman

Episode chronology
← Previous "Sweet Seymour Skinner's Baadasssss Song"	Next → "Lady Bouvier's Lover"
- The Simpsons season 5

"The Boy Who Knew Too Much" is the twentieth episode of the fifth season of the American animated television series The Simpsons. It originally aired on the Fox network in the United States on May 5, 1994. In this episode, Mayor Quimby's nephew Freddy is wrongly accused of assaulting a waiter, with Bart (who is playing truant from school) being the sole witness to the true course of events. Since Bart cannot reveal what he knows without admitting that he skipped school, he faces the dilemma of either testifying on Freddy's behalf and facing punishment himself, or staying silent and allowing a miscarriage of justice.

The episode was written by John Swartzwelder and directed by Jeffrey Lynch. The new character Freddy, voiced by Dan Castellaneta, was given the same type of cheekbones and nose as Quimby. The episode references films such as Westworld, Last Action Hero, Ferris Bueller's Day Off and Free Willy, and the characters Huckleberry Finn, Eddie, and Darwin. Actor Arnold Schwarzenegger and his wife Maria Shriver are also referenced.

Since airing, the episode has received mostly positive reviews from television critics. It acquired a Nielsen rating of 10.1, and was the fifth-highest rated show on the Fox network the week it aired.

== Plot ==
Bart forges a dental appointment note so he can skip school. Principal Skinner is not fooled and follows Bart through Springfield. As Skinner is about to corner him, Bart jumps into a passing convertible driven by Freddy Quimby, Mayor Quimby's 18-year-old nephew, as he is driving to the Quimby Compound.

At lunch, Freddy is served chowder, but he ridicules the waiter for pronouncing "chowder" with a French accent and demands he say it with a Boston accent. Freddy follows the waiter into the kitchen and appears to beat him up. Bart, hiding under a kitchen table, secretly witnesses the true turn of events.

Freddy is charged with assault and battery and put on trial. The whole town seems to believe Freddy is guilty, especially after Freddy loses his temper with his own attorney and threatens to kill him and the jury because he did not pronounce the word "chowder" in a Boston accent. Bart is reluctant to testify to prove Freddy's innocence because it would mean admitting that he skipped school and being punished by Skinner for it.

The jury intends to convict Freddy, with the exception of Homer, who casts the lone dissenting vote to cause a deadlock so he can enjoy the deluxe accommodations offered to the sequestered jury at a hotel. Bart tells the court that Freddy did not assault the waiter; instead, Freddy left with a bottle of champagne, and the waiter injured himself in a series of clumsy actions after slipping on a half-eaten mouthful that Bart had taken out of a giant Rice Krispies square. The waiter indignantly denies he is clumsy. Rising to protest, he trips over a chair and falls out the window into an open-roof truck filled with rat traps. When asked how he witnessed the incident when he was supposed to be in class, Bart reluctantly admits that he skipped school. Freddy is cleared of all charges. Skinner praises Bart for his honesty, but still gives him four months' detention for skipping school, much to Bart's disappointment.

At the end of the episode Homer and Marge are shown in their bed surrounded by swag (artwork, towels, lamps, a TV, stationery, chairs, tissues) Homer has stolen from his hotel room. Next to the bed and mounted to the wall is a box with a coin slot and a 25 cent mark on it suggesting that somehow Homer has managed to steal a coin operated vibrating bed mechanism from the hotel as well. As Marge is about to tell Homer about everything that happened at home in his absence, he puts on fake glasses so that he can sleep through it (just as he did during jury service).

== Production ==
"The Boy Who Knew Too Much" was written by John Swartzwelder and directed by Jeffrey Lynch. Executive producer David Mirkin "loved" that the whole situation of Bart seeing the waiter injure himself and not telling the truth ties together with the Homer plot in that it causes Homer to get jury duty and then caring only about going to the hotel. Mirkin thought it "worked really well". Freddy was voiced by Dan Castellaneta, who also voices Mayor Quimby. Freddy was given the same type of cheekbones and nose as Quimby. When Bart is fleeing from Skinner, a shot of Bart running down a hill from the season four episode "Kamp Krusty" was re-used along with a shot of Bart running away from the season three episode "Dog of Death".

== Cultural references ==
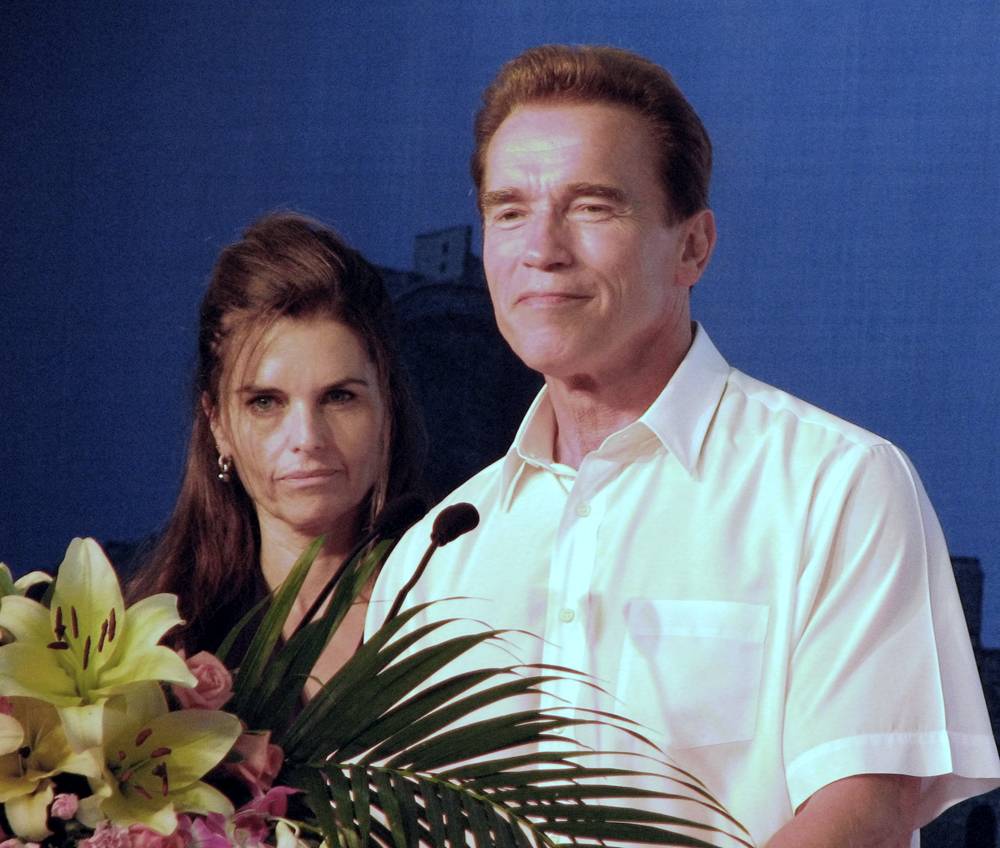
Actor Arnold Schwarzenegger and his then-wife Maria Shriver are parodied in the episode.

While riding on the prison bus, Bart looks out the window and has a dream that features him, Huckleberry Finn and Abraham Lincoln on a raft going down a river. Mirkin said Swartzwelder had always enjoyed putting presidents into his jokes, and this was only one of his many references to Lincoln. Bart's comment to Rainier Wolfcastle (a parody of Arnold Schwarzenegger) that his "last movie really sucked" and Chief Wiggum's subsequent "magic ticket, my ass" are in reference to Last Action Hero, a Schwarzenegger film featuring magic tickets that was panned by critics. Additionally, Wolfcastle's wife is named Maria; Schwarzenegger's wife at the time was Maria Shriver, a member through her mother of the Kennedy family.

Skinner's determination to expose Bart's truancy is reminiscent of Ed Rooney's obsession with exposing Ferris Bueller's chronic truancy in Ferris Bueller's Day Off. Series creator Matt Groening has a cameo appearance as the court illustrator in the Quimby trial. He can be seen signing his name on his sketch. During the trial, Bart quips "the system works. Just ask Claus von Bülow". This is a reference to the British socialite who was accused of attempted murder, but was acquitted after two trials. Of the twelve jurors, Homer is the only one to vote "not guilty", angering the other eleven; the trial ends with Freddy being found not guilty. This is a reference to the film 12 Angry Men. During the trial, Homer sings the jingle of the cat food company Meow Mix in his head. Jasper, one of the jurors, wants the trial to be over so that he can go home and watch television. He says that tonight "the dog from Frasier will ride the dolphin from seaQuest". Both Frasier and seaQuest DSV were popular on NBC, the highest-rated network in the United States for most of the 1990s.

At the hotel, Homer watches a new "director's cut" of the 1993 family film Free Willy that features Jesse being crushed by the titular whale. Homer says, "Oh, I don't like this new director's cut!" Homer rooms with Skinner at the hotel, and in a reference to the television series The Odd Couple, Skinner picks up a cigar butt from the floor with his umbrella while cleaning the room, just as Tony Randall does in the opening credits of that series.

== Reception ==
In its original broadcast, "The Boy Who Knew Too Much" finished fiftieth in the ratings for the week of May 2–8, 1994, with a Nielsen rating of 10.1, equivalent to approximately 9.5 million viewing households. It was the fifth highest-rated show on the Fox network that week, following Married... with Children, Living Single, Melrose Place and Beverly Hills, 90210.

Since airing, the episode has received mostly positive reviews from television critics.

The authors of the book I Can't Believe It's a Bigger and Better Updated Unofficial Simpsons Guide, Gary Russell and Gareth Roberts, praised the episode for containing "a memorable guest character in the French waiter Monsieur Lacosse, two great slapstick sequences involving the same, and displays Principal Skinner — pursuing Bart across the mountains like 'a non-giving-up school guy', and confessing that in some ways he's "a small man; a petty, small man" — in particularly fine form."

DVD Movie Guide's Colin Jacobson thought Freddy Quimby "may well be the most unpleasant character to grace the series — in an amusing way, though Freddy’s edginess makes him less amusing than his uncle. It’s rather startling to see Skinner so rapidly resume his dislike of Bart after the last episode, though. It’s fun to see his superhuman powers in the pursuit of Bart, and the mystery aspects of the show help make it a very good one. Add to that Homer on jury duty for even more entertainment."

Patrick Bromley of DVD Verdict gave the episode a grade of A for its "excellent bits thrown together to make this one, joke for joke, one of the season's funniest".

In 2007, Patrick Enright of Today.com called it his tenth favorite episode of the show. He said it was a perfect example of the show's "hilarious randomness" because of jokes such as Homer singing the Meow Mix cat food jingle, and the scene in which Homer discovers that if the jury’s deadlocked, they will be sequestered in a luxury hotel. Homer justifies his decision to be the lone dissenting voice by saying, "I’m only doing what I think is right. I believe Freddy Quimby should walk out of here a free hotel (when he should have said a 'free man')."

Entertainment.ie named it among the 10 greatest Simpsons episodes of all time.
