= Keep Chalm and Gary On =

- The Simpsons episode
- Episode no.: Season 37; Episode 2
- Directed by: Timothy Bailey
- Written by: Christine Nangle
- Production code: 36ABF12
- Original air date: October 5, 2025

Guest appearances
- Cole Escola as Devin; Adam Pally as Ben; Kerry Washington as Rayshelle Peyton

Episode features
- Commentary: Matt Groening: Matt Selman

Episode chronology
← Previous "Thrifty Ways to Thieve Your Mother"	Next → "Treehouse of Horror XXXVI"
- The Simpsons season 37

"Keep Chalm and Gary On" is the second episode of the thirty-seventh season of the American animated television series The Simpsons, and the 792nd episode overall. It aired in the United States on Fox on October 5, 2025. The episode was written by Christine Nangle and directed by Timothy Bailey.

In this episode, Superintendent Chalmers is fired from his job, but he finds success after discovering a substance that can be used as a beauty product. Cole Escola and Adam Pally guest starred. The episode received positive reviews.

This episode was dedicated in memory of primatologist and anthropologist Jane Goodall, who died on October 1.

== Plot ==
After Bart receives an A for his essay, Lisa realized he used an artificial intelligence app to write it for him. At Springfield Elementary, the teachers are unable to keep up with detecting work from students using the app. Superintendent Chalmers finds a solution by forcing students to encase their phones in a pouch to block them from receiving data. The students investigate Chalmers and discover he plagiarized part of his Master's thesis, so he is fired from his job.

Chalmers finds a new job as a janitor at the power plant. Homer believes he is working too hard, and tries to teach him to only appear to work hard. Mr. Burns and Smithers catch him taking a break and tell him to clean the tunnels behind the cooling towers. While there, he discovers giant mutated snails who cover him with their slime. At home, Shauna discovers that Chalmers' skin has de-aged, and she says that the slime is mucin. Chalmers and Burns start a business venture to sell the snail mucin, and they use the power plant workers to care for the snails and to collect and distribute the mucin.

Chalmers markets the mucin to men through social media and influencers. Other men with similar ventures compliment Chalmers on the difficulty of ending subscriptions to his products, which concerns him. Shauna tells him that his products are being used by children as well. Chalmers is invited to speak about his success at Springfield Elementary. He is disturbed when he sees all the students using his products. In his speech, he says he is not proud of who he has become and admonishes the children. He announces that he has just bought the school using his phone and bans skincare products from the school. Although he believes he will still make money from his mucin company, the power plant workers feed the snails potato chips and beer, which kill them.

== Production ==
Cole Escola guest starred as Devin, and Adam Pally guest starred as Ben.

== Cultural references ==
The episode title is a reference to the motivational poster "Keep Calm and Carry On" used by the British government during World War II.

== Reception ==
=== Viewing figures ===
Leading out of an NFL doubleheader, the episode earned a 0.75 rating and was watched by 3.04 million viewers, which was the most-watched show on Fox that night.

=== Critical response ===
Marcus Gibson of Bubbleblabber gave the episode a 7 out of 10. He liked the examination of the use of artificial intelligence in schools and the use of beauty products among children. However, he thought the plot repeated previous plot points when characters found business success. Mike Celestino of Laughing Place thought the episode was not as funny as last week's episode. He liked the snail idea even though he thought it was "absurd". He also liked the focus on Superintendent Chalmers because the character is not used often. Marisa Roffman of Give Me My Remote also thought the examination of artificial intelligence and beauty products used by children was relevant to current events.

JM McNab of Cracked.com highlighted the fact that the episode parodied the use of AI by students in American schools. In an article in The Express Tribune, the writer also highlighted this aspect and praised the episode's focus on Chalmers, concluding that "Fans praised the episode for its sharp satire and nostalgic charm. From the CheatGPT school subplot to the snail slime fever, 'Keep Chalmers and Gary On' delivers absurdist humor, social commentary and creative storytelling that longtime viewers have come to love." Cathal Gunning of Screen Rant criticized the fact that Bart hasn't had a Bart-centric episode "Bart's Brain" of the season 35. He compared the episode "Sweet Seymour Skinner's Baadasssss Song" of the season 5, which had a similar premise. He concluded, "As a result, this episode of The Simpsons feels like a spin-off that has forgotten the show's true protagonists." Nick Valdez of Comicbook.com ranked the episode 13th on his list "All Episodes of The Simpsons Season 37, Ranked Worst to Best." He said, "It's not the best Chalmers-centric episode, as he doesn't have as close a relationship with the Simpsons as in other episodes, but it's a fun episode."

=== Awards and nominations ===
Actor Hank Azaria was nominated for the Primetime Emmy Award for Outstanding Character Voice-Over Performance at the 78th Primetime Creative Arts Emmy Awards for his role as Superintendent Chalmers in this episode.
