= Thrifty Ways to Thieve Your Mother =

- The Simpsons episode
- Episode no.: Season 37; Episode 1
- Directed by: Gabriel DeFrancesco
- Written by: Jessica Conrad
- Production code: 36ABF13
- Original air date: September 28, 2025

Guest appearances
- Paul Brittain as Shawn Garrett Evanson; Cole Escola as Devin; David Herman as Clincher; Stephanie Hsu as Vidalia

Episode chronology
← Previous "Estranger Things"	Next → "Keep Chalm and Gary On"
- The Simpsons season 37

"Thrifty Ways to Thieve Your Mother" is the thirty-seventh season premiere of the American animated television series The Simpsons, and the 791st episode overall. It aired in the United States on Fox on September 28, 2025. The episode was written by Jessica Conrad and directed by Gabriel DeFrancesco. In this episode, Lisa joins the Fashion Club at school after becoming popular wearing Marge's old clothes. Paul Brittain, Cole Escola, David Herman, and Stephanie Hsu guest starred. The episode received positive reviews. The title is a spoof of the song, "50 Ways to Leave Your Lover" by Paul Simon.

This episode was dedicated in memory of longtime series composer Alf Clausen, who died on May 29.

== Plot ==
After being disgusted by the advertisements being played before streaming a movie, Marge decides to watch her boxset of the first season of Keagan's Pond with Lisa. Meanwhile, Homer and Bart stream the television series Clincher. When the first season of Keagan's Pond ends on a cliffhanger, Marge and Lisa search the attic for the second season. Lisa discovers Marge's old clothes that look like the ones the characters wear in the show and says they are trendy again. Marge suggests Lisa wear one of the dresses to school, and she hesitantly does. At school, trendy students Devin and Vidalia declare Lisa fashionable.

Lisa does not want to wear her usual dress, so she begins wearing all of Marge's old outfits and joins the Fashion Club at school. Devin and Vidalia invite Lisa to go thrifting with them, while Lisa also agrees to join Marge at a convention featuring Keagan's Pond actors on the same day. Lisa is shocked by the high prices at the thrift store, so she invites Devin and Vidalia to go through Marge's old clothes at home. She comments that all the mothers in town probably have trendy vintage clothing as well.

Meanwhile, Marge is angered when Lisa does not meet her at the convention. When she catches Lisa and her friends at home, the trendy students are cutting one of Marge's favorite old tops to make a crop top, and Lisa further insults Marge by saying she would not look "cool" in her old clothes. Furious, Marge takes back all her old clothes.

Later, Devin and Vidalia invite Lisa to a party at Ralph's house. Devin and Vidalia sneak away to steal Sarah Wiggum's old clothes, and Lisa realizes she has become an accessory to theft. After Devin and Vidalia rationalize the situation with Lisa, she decides to help steal from mothers who only have sons who will not wear their mothers' old clothes. Using the mother-son dance at school to ensure the mothers and sons are away, they switch the televisions to play Clincher at the houses to distract the fathers. While at the dance with Bart, Marge discovers the Fashion Club's plans. At the Prince house, Devin discovers they do not own a television and Gareth Prince triggers the alarm when he hears a noise. Lisa gets trapped in the attic, but Marge rescues her before the police arrive. Lisa apologizes to Marge who forgives her as Homer distracts Gareth and the police with Clincher. Bart dances with Milhouse's mother to Eric Carmen's "Hungry Eyes".

The next day as Lisa mentions to The Fashion Club that she’s grounded for eight months, Marge drives alongside them as she makes them return the stolen clothes.

== Production ==
Writer Jessica Conrad based the story on her own experience of wearing her mother's clothes and feeling "cool" when they came back into fashion. She wanted to present the feeling of the late 1990s and early 2000s for current-day children and included references to the Delia's brand and the television series Dawson's Creek. Director Gabriel DeFrancesco also encountered a similar experience while making the episode because his mother-in-law was sending his wife's old clothes for his children. A reference to the seventh season episode "Summer of 4 Ft. 2" where Lisa dresses differently was cut from the episode.

Executive producer Matt Selman stated that the opening scene of the Simpsons streaming a movie was a commentary about how "the streaming is so desperate for short-term money that they're eroding the value of the movie theater experience".

Paul Brittain guest starred as Shawn Garrett Evanson. Brittain previously appeared in the thirty-fourth season episode "From Beer to Paternity" as a different character. David Herman guest starred as Clincher. Herman previously appeared in the twenty-sixth season episode "Simpsorama" as Scruffy from the television series Futurama, created by Simpsons creator Matt Groening. Cole Escola guest starred as Devin, and Stephanie Hsu guest starred as Vidalia.

The title of the episode is based on the name of the Paul Simon song "50 Ways to Leave Your Lover".

== Cultural references ==
The 1990s television series Keagan's Pond that Marge and Lisa watch is a parody of the television series Dawson's Creek. Conrad based the scene on the idea of families watching old shows together during the COVID-19 lockdowns. The television series Clincher that Homer watches is a parody of the television series Reacher. Conrad became a fan of the series while writing the episode.

The scene where Lisa walks through the school changing outfits with each transition must have been inspired by a scene from the movie "The Devil Wears Prada." When Andrea walks through the streets of New York and the offices of Runway magazine with a similar staging.

== Reception ==
=== Viewing figures ===
The episode earned a 0.27 rating and was watched by 1.10 million viewers, which was the most-watched show on Fox that night.

=== Critical response ===
Marcus Gibson of Bubbleblabber gave the episode an 8 out of 10. He praised the episode's examination of Lisa and Marge's relationship and the trends of the 1990s, as well as its commentary on streaming films. Mike Celestino of Laughing Place appreciated the episode's jokes and its animation. He similarly highlighted the jokes commenting on the nostalgia of 1990s sitcoms. JM McNab of Cracked.com disliked the depiction of Shawn Garrett Evanson due to the current-day health status of actor James Van Der Beek of which the Evanson character is a parody. Nick Valdez of Comicbook.com ranked the episode number 4 on his list, "All Episodes of The Simpsons Season 37, Ranked Worst to Best." He said, "It's the only episode this season that delves into the dynamic between Marge and Lisa, and it's definitely one of the best. The show has needed a good Lisa storyline for a long time, and thankfully, this is it."

Cathal Gunning of Screen Rant pointed out that the fact that Marge was in the '90s already contradicts the show's canon, concluding, "If the show runs long enough, they could one day be Gen Z parents raising kids in the 2030s. Until then, The Simpsons Season 37, Episode 1, is yet another reminder that anything can happen in the show's world." On this topic, showrunner Matt Selman told Entertainment Weekly that this change was due to adapt the characters to new generations. He said, "Our show remains very popular both in the United States and internationally. I'm not worried about altering the chronology. I think the story and the characters should come first, and the rules of a cinematic universe for a show that doesn't have them should take a distant backseat."
