= Irrational Treasure =

- The Simpsons episode
- Episode no.: Season 37; Episode 14
- Directed by: Debbie Bruce Mahan
- Written by: Christine Nangle
- Production code: 37ABF08
- Original air date: February 15, 2026

Guest appearances
- Kevin Bacon as Philly concierge; Boyz II Men as themselves; Quinta Brunson as Adrienne; Taylor Dearden as ER intern; Katherine LaNasa as ER nurse; Questlove as tour guide; Noah Wyle as doctor

Episode features
- Chalkboard gag: "I will not have A.I. these write for me"
- Couch gag: The family is already seated on the couch except for Homer, who hobbles in bloodied and covered in splinters, complaining about Marge hitting him with her car through the garage door at the end of the opening sequence. He then collapses and, upon the shot cutting to the TV, complains about Maggie sitting in the car's front passenger seat.

Episode chronology
← Previous "Seperance"	Next → "Homer? A Cracker Bro?"
- The Simpsons season 37

"Irrational Treasure" is the fourteenth episode of the thirty-seventh season of the American animated television series The Simpsons, and the 804th episode overall. It aired in the United States on Fox on February 15, 2026, and is the 800th episode to air on Fox. (Note: Multiple episodes are considered the 800th episode. See The Simpsons season 37 § 800th episode for further details.) The episode was directed by Debbie Bruce Mahan and written by Christine Nangle.

In this episode, Santa's Little Helper competes in a dog competition in Philadelphia where he becomes the key to a treasure hunt. Kevin Bacon, Boyz II Men, Quinta Brunson, Taylor Dearden, Katherine LaNasa, Questlove, and Noah Wyle guest starred. The episode received positive reviews.

== Plot ==
After Homer and Bart bring home Santa's Little Helper as a Christmas gift, (Note: As depicted in the first season episode "Simpsons Roasting on an Open Fire") Homer and the kids spoil the dog and make him fat, which annoys Marge. When he eats Marge's ambrosia, which contains grapes, she rushes him to the veterinary hospital. The staff saves his life, and a trainer, Adrienne, helps Marge get the dog to lose weight. The dog begins winning competitions and qualifies for the national competition in Philadelphia. Marge bans Homer and the kids from accompanying her and the dog because of their bad influence.

In Philadelphia, Marge learns Homer stowed away to be a tourist. During the competition, Santa's Little Helper appears to favor Adrienne over Marge. After the competition day is over, Adrienne takes Marge and the dog to a fire hydrant exhibit. Meanwhile, Homer is approached by a group of people who believe the dog can lead them to Benjamin Franklin's gold. They claim the dog is a descendant of Franklin's dog. To prevent them from interfering with the competition, Homer takes them with him while he sees tourist sites. However, they find the dog at the exhibit, but Adrienne tells security to remove the group. When the dog urinates on America's first fire hydrant, Adrienne reveals that Franklin wrote a secret message it that the urine of his dog and his descendants can reveal. Adrienne sees the message and leaves with the dog.

Homer and Marge call Bart and Lisa to help solve the message and learn where Adrienne went. They deduce the location is Betsy Ross House. At the house, they push a lever, which causes Homer and Marge to fall through a trap door into a cavern. They find Adrienne, who uses the dog to retrieve a key to unlock Franklin's gold. Afraid the dog will die if he returns the key to Adrienne, Marge pleads with him to stay where he is. He obeys Marge, so Adrienne tries to go to the dog but causes the cavern's structures to collapse. The dog drops the key into a chasm and Adrienne jumps into the chasm with it. Marge becomes distraught thinking the dog died, but they see him hanging onto a rope by his teeth. The dog runs down to them. On their way out, Santa's Little Helper sticks his paws and snout into a wall, which unlock a room containing Franklin's gold, but Homer and Marge do not notice it.

During the credits, The Simpsons spoofs of different movie posters of Philadelphia-based movies are seen.

== Production ==
Writer Christine Nangle wrote the episode as a tribute to her hometown. The episode includes an easter egg of the University of Pennsylvania logo, which is the alma mater of Nangle and showrunner Matt Selman. It was not written deliberately to be the 800th episode on Fox but was selected after the creative team noticed the "scope and emotional hook" of the episode. To acknowledge the episode as the 800th episode on Fox, the episode begins with a recreation of the first episode of the series in its original animation style. The animation of the Homer and Marge watching Santa's Little Helper run down to them in the cavern was looped to make the action seem longer. The couch gag was cut from the original broadcast on Fox but is included on the streaming version on Hulu and Disney+.

Remarking on the series reaching 800 episodes, consulting producer Al Jean stated that the decision to reset the characters at the end of each episode instead of making "a big overarching story" helped make the series last as long as it has. Selman attributed the series' longevity to the characters not aging. Creator Matt Groening thought it was the continuous improvement in animation "to draw the characters correctly".

Kevin Bacon guest starred as Philly concierge, Quinta Brunson guest starred as Adrienne, Taylor Dearden guest starred as an ER intern, Katherine LaNasa guest starred as an ER nurse, Questlove guest starred as a tour guide, and Noah Wyle guest starred as a doctor. Dearden, LaNasa and Wyle played veterinarian parodies of their characters from the television series The Pitt. Their performance was directed by co-showrunner Michael Price, who is a fan of that show. The band Boyz II Men performed the episode's theme song and end title music.

== Cultural references ==
The plot contains parodies of the television series The Pitt and the film National Treasure.

== Reception ==
John Schwarz of Bubbleblabber gave the episode a 9.5 out of 10. He liked the Philadelphia references and the National Treasure parody. He said he "really couldn't find a lot of flaws this week". Mike Celestino of Laughing Place liked the jokes and the National Treasure parody. However, he noted the smaller roles of the Simpson children and the other Springfield residents.

Marisa Roffman of Give Me My Remote liked the story and the extended scene from the first episode. She also liked the Pitt parody. Nick Valdez of Comicbook.com ranked the episode number 7 on his list, "Every Episode of The Simpsons Season 37, Ranked Worst to Best." He said, "It's a heartbreaking revelation that shows how close she is to Santa's Little Helper, while also revealing her fear of losing him. There are some fun guest appearances and a few funny Philadelphia jokes, but the show takes a step back from the family, save for one funny scene. It just had too much to cover in one episode."
