= Seperance =

- The Simpsons episode
- Episode no.: Season 37; Episode 13
- Directed by: Matthew Nastuk
- Written by: Jeff Westbrook
- Production code: 37ABF07
- Original air date: January 4, 2026

Guest appearances
- Zach Cherry as Farley; Julianne Moore as Consonance

Episode chronology
← Previous "¡The Fall Guy-Yi-Yi!"	Next → "Irrational Treasure"
- The Simpsons season 37

"Seperance" is the thirteenth episode of the thirty-seventh season of the American animated television series The Simpsons, and the 803rd episode overall. It aired in the United States on Fox on January 4, 2026. The episode was written by Jeff Westbrook and directed by Matthew Nastuk.

In this episode, Homer gets a job advertising products and undergoes a surgical procedure to make him more energetic at work. Zach Cherry and Julianne Moore were credited as "Special Guest Voices". The episode received mixed reviews. The title is a spoof of Severance. "Seperance" was dedicated in memory of John Albarian.

== Plot ==
Ten years after enthusiastically starting his job at the power plant, Homer has become exhausted and lazy over time. During a family outing to a state park, Bart and Lisa excitedly collect stamps. At the gift shop, Marge tells Homer to pretend to care because it is the job of being a parent. He pretends to like the stress balls on display to the interest of Bart and Lisa and the other tourists. Fired by his old company and now working for Enthusiasm on Demand, Duffman observes Homer and offers him a job to advertise products as a regular person. For his first assignment, Homer advertises a self-balancing unicycle by riding it in front of news cameras reporting on a mine shaft disaster. His stunt lifts the spirit of the people there and attracts the attention of Consonance, the CEO of EoD.

When Homer struggles to advertise non-alcoholic beer, he is ordered to report to headquarters. Consonance says Homer is a victim of his personality and gives him a surgical procedure called Seperance to eliminate this hurdle. Homer becomes constantly enthusiastic at work, but Marge sees that he has no energy at home. Marge confronts Consonance, who offers her job and Seperance. When Marge sees Homer's personality at work, she accepts. However, Bart and Lisa become worried about Homer and Marge's low energy at home.

Bart and Lisa go to EoD headquarters and meet Duffman who has quit because he had no energy for his family and says EoD is hiding a secret. Bart, Lisa, and Duffman sneak inside EOD and spot a room where a red kangaroo is milking a baby with a bottle which spots them and sets off an alarm. This leads to them confronting Consonance who takes them to their parents before the animatronic statue of EoD's founder known as the Visionary. It is revealed that EoD's goal is to offer services for money, but Lisa says that is the goal of all businesses. They are confused that everything is normal or easily explained, but Duffman says to not believe them because they have been Seperanced. The employees explain that Seperance is merely basic cosmetic surgery to make the employees more attractive to sell products with Homer sporting hairplugs. They have low energy at home because they use all their energy for their jobs. Bart and Lisa beg Homer and Marge not to sacrifice their energy on their jobs, so Homer and Marge quit their jobs in order to be better parents at home.

== Production ==
Zach Cherry guest starred as Farley and Julianne Moore guest starred as Consonance. The episode marked the retirement of the character Duffman, the popular spokesperson for Duff Beer, as the fictional company retired his mascot for good.

== Release ==
The episode aired in the United States at a special time of 9:30 PM following the series premiere of the television series Best Medicine and a special episode of the television series Krapopolis.

== Cultural references ==
The episode title is a parody of the Apple TV+ science fiction series Severance. The song "Song 2" by Blur features throughout the episode.

== Reception ==
Marcus Gibson of Bubbleblabber gave the episode a 6 out of 10. He thought the episode was a "bizarre" way to comment on fake enthusiasm in marketing and in family life. He highlighted the scene of Homer selling stress balls and Julianne Moore's performance. Mike Celestino of Laughing Place liked the twist about what EoD does as well as the joke. He thought the plot was "being pretty out-there".

Marisa Roffman of Give Me My Remote liked the explanation that Homer and Marge were simply exhausted after work and was saddened that they gave up their jobs to be better parents. Nick Valdez of Comicbook.com ranked the episode 15th on his list, "Every Episode of The Simpsons Season 37, Ranked Worst to Best." He said, "It's a total parody of the Apple TV+ series Severance, and ultimately fails to find a fresh approach. While it has a funny gag revealing that this workplace is just as exhausting as any other, and that the 'second person' effect is simply a result of extreme fatigue, it's just not entertaining. These are jokes that many have already made about the Apple TV+ series, and it doesn't elevate the material in any way. It just feels very flat compared to the rest of the season."
