= Aunt Misbehavin' =

- The Simpsons episode
- Episode no.: Season 37; Episode 9
- Directed by: Gabriel DeFrancesco
- Written by: Juliet Kaufman
- Production code: 37ABF02
- Original air date: November 30, 2025

Guest appearances
- Stephen Tobolowsky as Merle; Mike Cullen as Rusty the Piercer; Gary Janetti as Stylish Patron

Episode chronology
← Previous "The Day of the Jack-up"	Next → "Guess Who's Coming to Skinner"
- The Simpsons season 37

"Aunt Misbehavin'" is the ninth episode of the thirty-seventh season of the American animated television series The Simpsons, and the 799th episode overall. It aired in the United States on Fox on November 30, 2025. The episode was written by Juliet Kaufman and directed by Gabriel DeFrancesco.

In this episode, Patty and Selma have a falling out when Selma is promoted at work and Patty and Bart use her access to declare Homer dead. Maggie Simpson does not appear in the episode. Stephen Tobolowsky is credited as "special guest star" while Mike Cullen and Gary Janetti guest star in this episode. The episode received positive reviews.

The episode was dedicated to the writer Dan McGrath who died earlier in the month.

== Plot ==
Selma is promoted to supervisor at the DMV, which irritates Patty when Selma starts giving her orders. Meanwhile, Bart traumatizes his dentist during his dental appointment causing Homer to drill holes into his Xbox as punishment. When Patty and Selma visit the Simpsons so Selma can show photos of her new office, Patty overhears Bart complaining about Homer. They conspire to impersonate Selma to declare Homer legally dead in the DMV records to make his life more difficult.

Later, Chief Wiggum pulls Homer over for reckless driving but is unable to cite him because he is declared dead. Realizing the benefits, Homer takes advantage of it to the annoyance of Bart, who goes to the DMV to tell Patty they made a mistake. Selma overhears what they did and fires Patty.

Feeling remorseful for getting her fired, Bart bonds with Patty over their similarities, and suggests she change her appearance to look less like Selma, so she gets a new hairstyle and ear piercing. Selma complains to Marge and Lisa about Patty's changes, and bonds with Lisa over their similarities. When Selma confesses that she stopped dating because Patty disliked the connections she made, Lisa suggests she start dating again. When Patty wakes up one day and finds a man named Merle who stayed overnight with Selma, Patty is enraged because she did not approve of him. She moves out of their apartment and goes to Palm Springfield, where she gets a job regulating historic homes.

Although Marge thinks Patty and Selma are now happy with their new lives, Lisa says Selma is only pretending to like Merle while Bart sees photos of a sad Patty on social media. They plan to have Patty and Selma encounter each other at a women's golf tournament to reconcile, but the tickets are sold out except for the VIP lounge. Homer has Merle devise a plan to earn enough credit card points to gain access to the lounge. Because Homer is legally dead, the tickets are void, so the Simpsons use Selma's access to declare Homer alive. When Patty and Selma see each other, they start arguing. Marge reasons with them, and they admit that they are unhappy in their new lives and reconcile.

Selma rehires Patty, who moves into an apartment next to Selma so they can maintain their sibling bond while still getting their own personal space. Merle moves out as Patty pushes him down the stairs.

During the credits, different black and white photos of Homer are seen.

== Production ==
Stephen Tobolowsky guest starred as Merle, Mike Cullen guest starred as Rusty the Piercer, and Gary Janetti guest starred as Stylish Patron.

== Cultural references ==
The episode title is a play on words with the title of the 1929 song "Ain't Misbehavin'" and its 1978 musical.

== Reception ==
=== Viewing figures ===
The episode earned a 0.28 rating and was watched by 1.15 million viewers, which was the most-watched show on Fox that night.

=== Critical response ===
Marcus Gibson of Bubbleblabber gave the episode a 7.5 out of 10. He liked the character development of Patty and Selma. He also highlighted the jokes of Homer being dead and the performance of Stephen Tobolowsky. Mike Celestino of Laughing Place thought the episode may rank as high as the classic episodes of the series. He stated that the episode "absolutely nails the voices and relationships of the characters we've known and loved for over three and a half decades." Marisa Roffman of Give Me My Remote liked the pairing of Patty with Bart and Selma with Lisa. She was curious to see if the changes to Patty and Selma would continue moving forward.

Nick Valdez of ComicBook.com points out that the episode emphasized the fact that Patty and Selma are separated throughout the plot until the end and said, "While this represents a major change for the twins after so long on a character level, mechanically they are still very close, both literally and emotionally." An article in The Express Tribune highlighted that the episode focused on the two of them and said that "With witty banter, strong character interactions and a funny narrative, 'Aunt Misbehavin' exemplifies the humor and relational dynamics that have kept The Simpsons appealing for more than three decades." JM McNab of Cracked.com said that the joke about Homer being "dead" is the best joke of the episode, but noted that the fake death had already been seen in the season seven episode "Mother Simpson." He concluded that "But possibly the funniest moment of the episode occurs during a montage of Homer reaping the rewards of his death, perfectly set to 'End of the Line' by The Traveling Wilburys."

Nick Valdez of Comicbook.com ranked the episode 10th on his list, "All Episodes of The Simpsons Season 37, Ranked Worst to Best." He said, "This is another case where the episode isn't necessarily the funniest of the season, but it made such a high ranking because of everything it accomplishes in its runtime. It was a major change for some of its long-standing characters."
