= Parahormonal Activity =

- The Simpsons episode
- Episode no.: Season 37; Episode 11
- Directed by: Chris Clements
- Written by: Loni Steele Sosthand
- Production code: 37ABF03
- Original air date: December 14, 2025

Guest appearances
- Lindsay Lohan as Maggie Simpson; Jon Lovitz as Artie Ziff; Megan Mullally as Sarah Wiggum

Episode features
- Couch gag: The Simpson family celebrates Marge's 39th birthday on the couch with flash forwards of subsequent birthdays until her 43rd birthday. She considers changing her hairstyle but declines because she is afraid.

Episode chronology
← Previous "Guess Who's Coming to Skinner"	Next → "¡The Fall Guy-Yi-Yi!"
- The Simpsons season 37

"Parahormonal Activity" is the eleventh episode of the thirty-seventh season of the American animated television series The Simpsons, and the 801st episode overall. It aired in the United States on Fox on December 14, 2025. The episode was written by Loni Steele Sosthand and directed by Chris Clements.

In this episode, the Simpson family experiences hormonal changes as they grow older. It features guest appearances by actor Jon Lovitz as his recurring character Artie Ziff, Megan Mullally as Sarah Wiggum, and Lindsay Lohan as the future version of Maggie Simpson. The episode received mixed reviews, with praise for Lohan's performance as Maggie.

The episode was dedicated to the memory of Frank Gehry who guest starred as himself in "The Seven-Beer Snitch" and died nine days before the episode premiered.

== Plot ==
Four years into the future, Bart and Lisa are dealing with teenage hormones, with Lisa complaining about her acne, and they are always low on food because Bart eats it all. When Bart wants to drive the car, Marge forbids it after Maggie mentions that Bart is an irresponsible driver. Driving Lisa to school, Marge tries to encourage Lisa, who has lost confidence in performing, to sing "Escape (The Piña Colada Song)" with her, and embarrasses Lisa by giving her a package in case she gets her first period.

At Luann's house, Marge's friends discuss experiencing perimenopause. They describe their symptoms before they try Botox, but Marge declines. That night, Marge starts having symptoms. She notices Bart's manga depicts a robot with large breasts which horrifies her, but Homer says it is better than adult films. When Marge realizes what is happening to her, she fears she is becoming old and becomes irritable hearing her children complain, so Homer takes charge to calm everyone down. After Marge encounters Artie Ziff who no longer finds her attractive, she desperately has Luann give her Botox, but Lisa catches her and angrily calls her a hypocrite. When Marge finds adult films on Bart's tablet, she fears he will become someone who objectifies women (such as an Incel or someone pertaining to the Manosphere). As a result, she bans electronic screens from the house. Marge gets estrogen cream to handle her symptoms. Homer buys a smart refrigerator to quickly buy food when they run out. Impressed, Marge tries to have sex with Homer. When he is unable to perform, Dr. Hibbert gives him erectile dysfunction medication which makes him aggressive.

Later, the Simpsons prepare to attend Ned Flanders' wedding to a woman named Pam with Bart as the videographer and Lisa as the wedding singer. Marge and Lisa continue to argue and Marge says she is struggling with her changes. Lisa counters that she is handling her changes well because she dealt with her first period by herself. When Bart stops Homer from using the smart refrigerator's screen, Marge checks it to find that Bart used it to watch adult films, and destroys it. Due to Marge and Homer's irrational behavior, they have no choice but to let Bart drive. They forget the flowers that Maggie was going to throw as part of her flower girl job, so Marge has her improvise with potato chips at the wedding.

At the wedding reception, an aggressive Homer takes Marge's estrogen to calm himself down, but becomes too emotional as a result and ends up giving a heartfelt toast to Ned, discarding the scathing roast he had planned earlier. Filming the reception, Bart sees a girl he likes and awkwardly talks to her, which relieves Marge's fears for him. She apologizes to Lisa and says she does not have to perform. However, when Marge experiences a hot flash because Homer used all the estrogen, Lisa sings and plays "Escape (The Piña Colada Song)" on a Fender Esquire on stage for her.

== Production ==
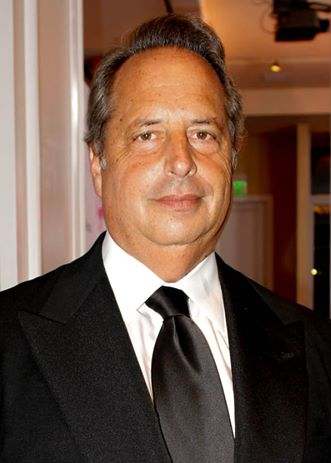
Jon Lovitz guest starred as Artie Ziff.

This is the sixth future-themed Simpsons episode.

Lindsay Lohan guest starred as the future Maggie Simpson. Jon Lovitz returned as a guest star to voice Artie Ziff.

== Release ==
The episode aired simultaneously in the United States in all time zones at 8:31 PM ET/5:31 PM PT following a special episode of the television series Universal Basic Guys.

== Reception ==
=== Critical response ===
Marcus Gibson of Bubbleblabber gave the episode an 8.5 out of 10. He liked the episode's examination of common life problems through the lens of the show's characters. He also highlighted Lindsay Lohan's performance as Maggie. Mike Celestino of Laughing Place wanted the episode to be funnier but liked the scene of Bart driving. He generally disliked flash-forward episodes because he did not like seeing the Simpson family at older ages.

Marisa Roffman of Give Me My Remote also highlighted Lohan's performance and the commentary about women's health research. She also liked that Flanders found love again. Nick Valdez of Comicbook.com ranked the episode number 8 on his list, "Every Episode of The Simpsons Season 37, Ranked Worst to Best." He said, "It's not exactly the best episode we've seen about the future, as it doesn't focus on Bart and Lisa's future, but it fits perfectly with the show's current identity. Each character feels like a natural extension of themselves, and there are plenty of funny sequences, like when Marge destroys her refrigerator. It's an entertaining episode that reveals a point in the timeline with a lot of potential for future storylines, so hopefully it's the first of many more."

=== Awards and nominations ===
Writer Loni Steele Sosthand was nominated for the Writers Guild of America Award for Television: Animation at the 78th Writers Guild of America Awards for her script for this episode.
