= The Simpsons season 37 =

Season of television series

The Simpsons
- Season 37
- Promotional poster featuring the Simpson family
- Showrunners: Al Jean (2 episodes); Matt Selman
- No. of episodes: 15 (Fox); 4 (Disney+); 19 (total)

Release
- Original network: Fox; Disney+ (select episodes)
- Original release: September 28, 2025 – August 26, 2026

Season chronology
- ← Previous; Season 36 Next → Season 38

The thirty-seventh season of the American animated sitcom The Simpsons started airing on Fox on September 28, 2025. The season is the first of four seasons ordered by Fox. It was produced by Gracie Films and 20th Television Animation. The primary showrunner for the season is Matt Selman. In addition to the Fox broadcast season, several episodes were ordered by Disney+ and released exclusively through the streaming service.

== Voice cast and characters ==
=== Main cast ===
- Dan Castellaneta as Homer Simpson, Grampa Simpson, Groundskeeper Willie, State Comptroller Atkins, Barney Gumble, Squeaky-Voiced Teen, Mayor Quimby, Sideshow Mel, Krusty the Clown, Mr. Teeny, Gil Gunderson, Santa's Little Helper, Snowball II, Hans Moleman, Yes Guy, Rich Texan, Blue-Haired Lawyer, additional voices
- Julie Kavner as Marge Simpson, Patty and Selma Bouvier, Jacqueline Bouvier
- Nancy Cartwright as Bart Simpson, Database, Ralph Wiggum, Nelson Muntz, Kearney Zzyzwicz, Maggie Simpson, additional voices
- Yeardley Smith as Lisa Simpson
- Hank Azaria as Gareth Prince, Chief Wiggum, Superintendent Chalmers, Moe Szyslak, Snake Jailbird, Kirk Van Houten, Comic Book Guy, Coach Krupt, Professor Frink, Raphael, Mr. Zörker, Pyro, Duffman, Disco Stu, additional voices
- Harry Shearer as Lenny Leonard, Principal Skinner, Officer Eddie, Dewey Largo, Mr. Burns, Waylon Smithers, Reverend Lovejoy, Ned Flanders, Otto Mann, Rainier Wolfcastle, Kent Brockman, Principal Dondelinger, additional voices

=== Supporting cast ===
- Tress MacNeille as Agnes Skinner, Myra, Shauna Chalmers, Lindsay Naegle, Amazon Alexa, Dolph Shapiro, Brandine Spuckler, Joseph Quimby III, Lunchlady Dora, Dr. Thurston, additional voices
- Kevin Michael Richardson as Dr. Hibbert, additional voices
- Kimberly Brooks as Janey Powell, Lewis Clark, additional voices
- Rosalie Chiang as Hubert Wong
- Mo Collins as Jimbo Jones
- Grey DeLisle as Sherri and Terri, Martin Prince, Üter, Wendell Borton, Ham, additional voices
- Alex Désert as Carl Carlson, Officer Lou, additional voices
- Chris Edgerly as Fatberg (in "Treehouse of Horror XXXVI"), additional voices
- Dawnn Lewis as Bernice Hibbert, Pam (in "Parahormonal Activity"), Naima, additional voices
- Jonathan Lipow as various animals
- Eric Lopez as additional voices
- Kelly Macleod as Milhouse Van Houten
- Tony Rodríguez as Julio
- Maggie Roswell as Luann Van Houten, Miss Hoover, Helen Lovejoy, additional voices
- Jenny Yokobori as additional voices

=== Guest cast ===
Guest stars for the season include Kieran Culkin, Glenn Howerton, Albert Brooks, Cole Escola, Danny Pudi, Adam Pally, Brendan Gleeson, Domhnall Gleeson, Idris Elba, Jon Lovitz, Michael Keaton, Viola Davis, and Lindsay Lohan.

== Episodes ==
No. overall	No. in season (Note: Episodes without an episode number within the season constitute exclusive episodes commissioned and released by Disney+.)	Title	Directed by	Written by	Original release date	Prod. code	U.S. viewers (millions)
791	1	"Thrifty Ways to Thieve Your Mother"	Gabriel DeFrancesco	Jessica Conrad	September 28, 2025	36ABF13	1.10
After Marge introduces Lisa to the '90s teen drama Keagan's Pond via DVD, she also shows her some of the old clothing she used to wear as a kid. Lisa likes the retro style and wears it to school, where a group of fashionista kids love her new look. But soon Lisa abandons her mother for her new friends and accidentally gives them the idea to raid the closets of other Springfield mothers to get retro threads. Meanwhile, Homer discovers a macho action drama show named Clincher and gets hooked on watching it. Guest stars: Paul Brittain as Shawn Garrett Evanson and Keagan, Cole Escola as Devin, David Herman as John Clinch and Stephanie Hsu as Vidalia Note: This episode was dedicated in memory of longtime series composer Alf Clausen, who died on May 29.
792	2	"Keep Chalm and Gary On"	Timothy Bailey	Christine Nangle	October 5, 2025	36ABF14	3.04
When attempts to stop the children of Springfield Elementary using A.I. to cheat cost Superintendent Chalmers his job, he becomes a janitor at the nuclear plant and discovers that slime excreted by giant radioactive snails there can be used as a miracle skin-care product. Guest stars: Cole Escola as Devin, Adam Pally as Ben and Kerry Washington as Rayshelle Peyton Note: This episode was dedicated in memory of Jane Goodall.
793	3	"Treehouse of Horror XXXVI"	Matthew Faughnan	Broti Gupta & Michael Price & Dan Greaney	October 19, 2025	36ABF15	4.08
Three different stories are told: "The Last Days of Crisco": In a parody of The Blob, a fat-eating monster emerges from the sewers. With Chief Wiggum being its first victim, current Chief of Police Lou tries to warn the town about.; "The Clown Night of the Devil": In 1995 as a parody of Late Night with the Devil, Krusty the Clown's Halloween special gets disrupted by the Devil who starts possessing different attendees.; "Plastic World": In a parody of Waterworld with elements of the Mad Max franchise, plastic items have covered the world as everyone struggles to survive while contending with those that were thought dead who have been turned into Plastic People.; Guest stars: Ike Barinholtz as Wayne the Grip, Viola Davis as Plastic World Narrator/Plastic Maggie Simpson, Idris Elba as the Devil, Matt Groening as Himself, and Michael Keaton as Hal Julian
794	4	"Men Behaving Manly"	Steven Dean Moore	John Frink	October 26, 2025	36ABF12	1.05
The men of Springfield are in a crisis of masculinity, becoming lazy and lazy good-for-nothings, which prompts Marge to send them to a Man Camp to understand empathy and the feelings of women. Guest stars: Albert Brooks as Greg and Maurice LaMarche as Fred Flintstone
795	5	"Bad Boys... for Life?"	Eric Koenig	Al Jean	November 2, 2025	36ABF17	1.13
Finding nothing good to watch on television, the Simpson family recount the time when Homer's bad parenting led to 6-year-old Bart's first prank, which then saw Bart almost taken away to be put in juvenile detention when he is misdiagnosed as a psychopath. Guest stars: Maurice LaMarche as Jerry Seinfeld, Matthew Modine as Dr. Leonard Stern, Troy Baker as Jonesy and Suzie Yeung as Hope
796	6	"Bart 'N' Frink"	Rob Oliver	Brian Kelley	November 9, 2025	36ABF16	1.99
Bart ends up loving Professor Frink's home laboratory, which led to him becoming his assistant, and the Simpsons accompany Frink to his college reunion. Guest stars: Glenn Howerton as Peter Linz and Danny Pudi as Johnson Bryans
797	7	"Sashes to Sashes"	Mike Frank Polcino	Ryan Koh	November 16, 2025	36ABF18	0.89
In an election to see who will run for student council president at Springfield Elementary School, Bart runs against the son of Mayor Quimby named Joe Quimby III. Flashbacks show Mayor Quimby's early life being brought up by his father Joe Quimby Sr. as well as his brief marriage to Beatrice Bouvier. Guest stars: Carrie Coon as Beatrice Bouvier, Cole Escola as Devin, Brendan Gleeson as Joe Quimby Sr. (old), Domhnall Gleeson as Joe Quimby Sr. (young)
798	8	"The Day of the Jack-up"	Mike Frank Polcino	Joel H. Cohen	November 23, 2025	37ABF01	2.46
In this episode that evokes the elements of Operation Flagship and Trap, Mr. Burns opens a new high-tech concert hall and Lisa's favourite K-Pop band Kneesock Dolls are one of the first acts to hold a concert. But when a ticket scalper known as "SeatMiser" buys up all of the tickets and resells them, Homer does what he can to get Lisa to see the Kneesock Dolls while Mayor Quimby hires an FBI Profiler to help Chief Wiggum catch SeatMiser who is someone they'd least suspect. Guest stars: Paget Brewster as FBI Profiler, Symone Holliday and Courtney Rosemont as Kneesock Dolls
799	9	"Aunt Misbehavin'"	Gabriel DeFrancesco	Juliet Kaufman	November 30, 2025	37ABF02	1.15
While Bart's dental checkup antics cause a costly bill that results in Homer taking a power drill to Bart's Xbox, Selma gets a promotion at work that frustrates Patty. This leads Bart and Patty to conspire to have Homer declared legally dead only for it to backfire on both of them that involves Selma waking up in bed with a man named Merle. Guest stars: Stephen Tobolowsky as Merle, Mike Cullen as Rusty the Piercer, and Gary Janetti as Stylish Patron Note: This episode was dedicated in memory of Dan McGrath.
800 (Note: Multiple episodes are considered the 800th episode. See The Simpsons season 37 § 800th episode for further details.)	10	"Guess Who's Coming to Skinner"	Rob Oliver	John Frink	December 7, 2025	37ABF04	3.69
Principal Skinner discovers that a boy named Hub has been living in the school library. As he has no parents, Principal Skinner has no choice but to take him in and be a foster parent. Guest stars: Kieran Culkin as Alexander "Hub" Hubley and Farmer McGregor, Karen Gillan as Mayisie MacWheldon, Kurtwood Smith as Mr. Hubley, Barry Sonnenfeld as Phillip Ho-Hum, and Kerry Washington as Rayshelle Peyton
801	11	"Parahormonal Activity"	Chris Clements	Loni Steele Sosthand	December 14, 2025	37ABF03	1.50
In the near future, a hormonal onslaught affects Bart and Lisa as Marge copes with it. Meanwhile, Homer is made Ned Flanders' best man at his upcoming wedding to a woman named Pam. Guest stars: Lindsay Lohan as Maggie Simpson, Jon Lovitz as Artie Ziff. Note: This episode was dedicated in memory of Frank Gehry. Megan Mullally is credited, despite not appearing in the episode.
802	12	"¡The Fall Guy-Yi-Yi!"	Timothy Bailey	Cesar Mazariegos	December 28, 2025	37ABF06	2.61
Embarrassed by how much of a wuss his father is, Bart encourages Homer watch a live MMA fight which leads to Homer getting into an accident that knocks out both fighters in the process. Noticing that Homer barely got hurt in the process, Bumblebee Man approaches Homer asking him to be his secret stunt double, confessing that he feels he can no longer do the job. Homer accepts for the sake of making Bart unashamed of him, but it isn't long before the injuries start to take their toll. Guest stars: Patricia Acevedo as Channel Ocho Script Supervisor and Mexican Little Girl, Alejandro González Iñárritu as himself, Johnny Knoxville as himself, Claudia Motta as Mexican Grandmother, Humberto Vélez as Bumblebee Man and Himself, and Los Tigres Del Norte performing "El Corrido de Pedro y Homero" Note: This episode was dedicated in memory of Rob Reiner.
803	13	"Seperance"	Matthew Nastuk	Jeff Westbrook	January 4, 2026	37ABF07	0.88
While on an outing with the family at a state park, Homer manages to spontaneously sell a whole bunch of stress balls to everybody at the gift ship by faking enthusiasm about them. This leads to Duffman approaching him on behalf of a mysterious shady company named "Enthusiasm on Demand" in order to recruit him to fake enthusiasm in order to sell other products. When Marge notices that Homer's new job leaves him with no energy at home any more and complains to management, she is convinced to join Enthusiasm on Demand herself. Guest stars: Zach Cherry as Farley, Julianne Moore as Consonance Note: This episode was dedicated in memory of John Albarian.
804	14	"Irrational Treasure"	Debbie Bruce Mahan	Christine Nangle	February 15, 2026	37ABF08	1.19
Marge worries that Santa’s Little Helper is out of shape and turns to a driven dog trainer to help him get fit. Her efforts pay off when Santa’s Little Helper qualifies for the National Dog Show in Philadelphia, where Marge and Homer are unexpectedly pulled into an offbeat historical mystery involving rival treasure hunters and a supposed secret buried in American history. As the adventure escalates, Marge discovers the trainer has been using the competition for her own ends — and Santa’s Little Helper ultimately proves his loyalty by helping expose the truth. Guest stars: Kevin Bacon as Philadelphia Concierge, Boyz II Men as themselves, Quinta Brunson as Adrienne, Taylor Dearden as E.R. Intern, Katherine LaNasa as E.R. Nurse, Questlove as Tour Guide, and Noah Wyle as Doctor
805	15	"Homer? A Cracker Bro?"	Chris Clements	Ryan Koh	February 15, 2026	37ABF05	1.14
Homer forms an unlikely friendship with Kirk Van Houten, and together they stumble into success after launching a viral "crumbless" cracker. As the business grows, Homer learns that Kirk has been cutting corners and skirting the law to keep the company afloat, dragging Homer into mounting legal and financial trouble. With Marge increasingly alarmed by the risks to their family, Homer is forced to decide whether to stick by Kirk or walk away before the partnership costs him everything. Guest stars: Michael Stipe as himself
806	–	"Extreme Makeover: Homer Edition"	Matthew Nastuk	Michael Price	June 17, 2026	36ABF20	N/A
807	–	"Extreme Makeover: Homer Edition"	Timothy Bailey	Nick Dahan	June 17, 2026	36ABF21	N/A
Homer and Marge have a date night with the former's work friends and their respective dates. Unfortunately, Shauna, who was hired to sit the kids, is overdosed on painkillers after injuring her leg, so Homer "assigns" the doorbell camera as the sitter. As Marge connects with the friends, she becomes more and more exasperated with Homer. As she becomes more and more drunk, she imagines what life would be like if her husband were a fighter pilot, a tired ad executive, or a clown-themed supervillain. Guest stars: Betty Gilpin as Amy, Jon Hamm as Cameo, Laufey as herself, Tegan and Sara as themselves
808	–	"Simpsley"	Debbie Bruce Mahan	Cesar Mazariegos	July 3, 2026	36ABF19	N/A
When the con artist Marge Bouvier goes to Italy to bring Seymour Skinner home, her plans are thwarted - by a clingy permanent houseguest, Homer Simpsley.
809	–	"Yellow Mirror"	Matthew Faughnan	Carolyn Omine & Kai Omine	August 26, 2026	36ABF22	N/A
"The Way We Wasn't": Homer Simpson wakes up from a knock on the head as he realizes that his family was a dream. Homer copes with it by making a TV show called “The Sadsons”. "I Have No Tablet But I Must Stream": Marge gives Maggie a MyPad and has her keep busy, however, an AI tablet tries to control her. At the Town Hall of Springfield, the AI has all the babies under control, and because of Lisa, feels overwhelmed. Guest stars: Patti Harrison as Hailey, Demi Moore as Lydia, Kai Omine as Sideshow Mel Cosplayer, David Silverman as himself

== Production ==
On April 2, 2025, following the release of the thirty-sixth season, it was announced that Fox had renewed The Simpsons for four more seasons, intending to take it to the fortieth season, with fifteen episodes each. In addition, two episodes per season were ordered to be released exclusively on the streaming service Disney+. Executive producer Matt Selman continued his role as primary showrunner, a role he had since the thirty-third season. Selman had previously been the showrunner for several episodes each season since the twenty-third season. This is the final season in which executive producer Al Jean also served as showrunner for several holdover episodes from the season 36 production line (36ABF). While for those from Season 37 (37ABF), he serves as a consulting producer, a role he reprises from seasons 5-9. The Treehouse of Horror episode included an opening segment from guest animator Stan Kelly of The Onion. The season contained eleven holdover episodes from the previous season with seven for Fox and four for Disney+.

== Release ==
The season premiered on September 28, 2025, on Fox's Animation Domination block along with Bob's Burgers, Krapopolis and Universal Basic Guys.

=== 800th episode ===
The 800th episode overall, "Guess Who's Coming to Skinner", aired on December 7, 2025. The 800th Fox-produced episode, "Irrational Treasure", premiered on February 15, 2026, along with the season finale. The 800th production episode, "Extreme Makeover: Homer Edition", was released on Disney+ on June 17, 2026.

== Reception ==
The episode "Homer? A Cracker Bro?" was nominated for the Primetime Emmy Award for Outstanding Animated Program, and actor Hank Azaria was nominated for the Primetime Emmy Award for Outstanding Character Voice-Over Performance for his role as Superintendent Chalmers in the episode "Keep Chalm and Gary On" at the 78th Primetime Creative Arts Emmy Awards. Writer Loni Steele Sosthand was nominated for the Writers Guild of America Award for Television: Animation at the 78th Writers Guild of America Awards for her script for "Parahormonal Activity".
