= Bad Boys... for Life? =

- The Simpsons episode
- Episode no.: Season 37; Episode 5
- Directed by: Eric Koenig
- Written by: Al Jean
- Production code: 36ABF17
- Original air date: November 2, 2025

Guest appearances
- Maurice LaMarche as Jerry Seinfeld; Matthew Modine as Dr. Leonard Stern; Troy Baker as Jonesy; Suzie Yeung as Hope

Episode features
- Couch gag: The Simpson family encounters Fortnite characters on the couch. After the family draws Fortnite weapons, the characters escape except for Peely. The Simpsons later eat a banana split out of its mouth.

Episode chronology
← Previous "Men Behaving Manly"	Next → "Bart 'N' Frink"
- The Simpsons season 37

"Bad Boys... for Life?" is the fifth episode of the thirty-seventh season of the American animated television series The Simpsons, and the 795th episode overall. It aired in the United States on Fox on November 2, 2025. The episode was directed by the show's second unit director Eric Koenig and written by Al Jean.

In this episode, the Simpson family tells the story of when they thought Bart may be a bad boy. Maurice LaMarche and Matthew Modine are billed as "special guest voices". The episode received positive reviews.

== Plot ==
Unable to decide on a television show to stream, Lisa asks Marge for a story about when the children were younger. She tells a story about a time when they thought Bart was a bad boy.

Four years earlier, Homer always ignored Bart, which irritated him, and Marge told him to bond with Bart. Homer wrote on a whiteboard to express his feelings toward Bart. When he gave the marker to Bart to write, Homer prevented him from using his left hand. This left Bart angry toward Homer. Later when Bart saw Nelson bully Milhouse at the playground, Bart believed Homer was a bully. He decided to stand up to him and performed his first prank on Homer. When Marge saw this, she feared that Bart was bad.

When Bart's pranks constantly put Homer in danger, Marge took him to psychiatrist Dr. Stern who was shocked by his behavior. He decided to incarcerate him in a psychiatric facility. He obtained an emergency court order to take him next week over the objection of Marge. When Homer experienced a nightmare about Bart's life at the facility, Homer drove away with Bart before the social workers arrived to take him.

After Homer bought donuts, he noticed Bart struggling to grab the last one. When he saw Bart salivating over it, Homer realized that Bart was the same as him and placed the donut in Bart's left hand. They went to Homer's treehouse which his younger self went when he was upset with Grampa. Homer attempted to flee with Bart to Canada where they are turned away by the border guard. This causes Homer and Bart to return to the treehouse.

The social workers located them, and they lured Bart out with glow sticks. Homer ate the Ritalin intended for Bart and realized that Bart is not bad and that he was an inferior father. Dr. Stern asked Bart what he wanted to do. Bart said he wanted to be with his father. Homer and Bart hugged, and Stern left with the social workers.

After finishing the story, Marge says it was how they learned to avoid social services.

During the credits, the Simpsons hear a knock at the door and the family hides. It is Ned Flanders trying to offer them cookies as Homer takes the cookies.

== Production ==
This is the final episode in which executive producer Al Jean served as showrunner. Jean had been working on this episode since 2022. He said the episode was based on his relationship with his father as well as being a father. The original title for the episode was "“Bart's First Prank". Homer's line "He's me" when he describes Bart is a reference to the first Simpsons episode "Simpsons Roasting on an Open Fire" when he describes Santa's Little Helper. Jean continued to serve as a consulting producer on the series while working on other projects.

Matthew Modine guest starred as Dr. Leonard Stern. The character is a parody of Modine's character Martin Brenner from the television series Stranger Things. He called it an "honor" to be part of the series. His performance was directed by Jean, whom Modine called "fast and efficient". The character was named after Leonard B. Stern who worked on the television series The Honeymooners and Get Smart. Maurice LaMarche guest starred as Jerry Seinfeld. Fortnite characters Jonesy and Hope are voiced by Troy Baker and Suzie Yeung.

== Cultural references ==
The episode title is a reference to the sequel to the 2020 action/comedy film, Bad Boys for Life, which is part of the Bad Boys franchise. Characters from the video game Fortnite appear in the couch gag. The appearance occurred at the same time the video game was hosting a Simpsons season. As part of the video game's season, several animated Simpsons shorts appeared in the video games as well as on Disney+. A second Fortnite couch gag was released several days after the episode aired.

Near the beginning where the Simpsons are watching TV, there are shows that make references to other films/series like 'Very Old Sheldon' (Young Sheldon), 'To Catch & Release a Predator' (To Catch a Predator), 'If Andor But' (Andor), 'Ring of Thrones' (Game of Thrones), and 'Rehashing of the Talking of The Walking Dead' (The Walking Dead).

== Reception ==
=== Viewing figures ===
The episode earned a 0.26 rating and was watched by 1.13 million viewers, which was the most-watched show on Fox that night.

=== Critical response ===
Marcus Gibson of Bubbleblabber gave the episode a 7.5 out of 10. He liked the examination of Homer and Bart's relationship when they were younger but thought the ending was "a tad rushed". Mike Celestino of Laughing Place liked the animation and the examination of the relationship between Homer and Bart but thought the episode was not funny after the first act. Marisa Roffman of Give Me My Remote called it a "sweet episode" and liked the references to the show's history.

Nick Valdez of ComicBook.com said the episode confirmed the fan theory that Bart was left-handed, as it has been shown since he was six years old. He concluded: "It's been a secret among fans, as he's been seen writing with his left hand in the past. However, this is the first time the franchise has addressed this aspect of his personality openly, fully confirming a long-held fan belief." JM McNab of Cracked.com appreciated the homage paid to the first episode of the series "Simpsons Roasting on an Open Fire," since in one scene Homer says the phrase "He's a nuisance, he's uncontrollable! He's... he's like me!", which is similar to what he says in the original episode: "But he's a loser, he's pathetic, he's... a Simpson."

Nick Valdez of Comicbook.com ranked the episode number 3 on his list "All Episodes of The Simpsons Season 37, Ranked Worst to Best." He said, "It's definitely the most Bart-centric episode of the season, and it's a flashback that feels fresh despite the number of flashbacks we've seen over the years in the animated series' floating timeline."
