= Men Behaving Manly =

- The Simpsons episode
- Episode no.: Season 37; Episode 4
- Directed by: Steven Dean Moore
- Written by: John Frink
- Production code: 36ABF12
- Original air date: October 26, 2025

Guest appearances
- Albert Brooks as Greg; Maurice LaMarche as Fred Flintstone look-alike

Episode chronology
← Previous "Treehouse of Horror XXXVI"	Next → "Bad Boys... for Life?"
- The Simpsons season 37

"Men Behaving Manly" is the fourth episode of the thirty-seventh season of the American animated television series The Simpsons, and the 794th episode overall. It aired in the United States on Fox on October 26, 2025. The episode was written by John Frink and directed by Steven Dean Moore.

In this episode, the men of Springfield are sent to Man Camp to understand empathy and the feelings of women. Albert Brooks and Maurice LaMarche guest starred. The episode received negative reviews.

== Plot ==
During summer break from school, Bart plays games on his virtual reality headset in his room, and Homer joins him. Marge wants them to go outside, so Homer suggests fishing. While searching for a place to fish on his phone, Homer and Bart end up using their phones on the couch where Grampa berates for not acting like men. Looking for advice, Marge asks Alexa, which tells her to send them to Man Camp and Boys Camp, and it gives the same advice for all the male residents in town.

At Man Camp, Greg welcomes the men of Springfield and tells them they will be learning how to understand other people's feelings. He tells them they must appreciate the women in their lives. He has the men look into each other's eyes to learn empathy. At Boys Camp, Greg subdues the boys when they attempt to bully him, and he takes away and eats their phones. He gives them some sticks which he stole from a nearby Boy Scouts campsite and has them use their imaginations to build things.

Later, they work together to rescue Ralph from the river. For the final test, Greg tells the men and boys to hunt a duck for dinner. Homer chooses to stop them from killing it and decides to care for it instead. Greg says that Homer passed the test by showing kindness, which makes the men and boys emotional. With their lessons completed, the males begin to go home. Meanwhile, the women of Springfield use the opportunity to remake the town without the men's interference, liberating it from the tyranny of male fascism and establishing the first ever successful socialist society.

Learning the men are returning, the women resolve to keep the town changed. After meeting the men on the road and telling them, the men admit they were the problem. Homer looks into Marge's eyes, and she feels loved. The men and the women of the town embrace.

During the credits, photos of different parts of the episode are seen as Greg talks about his success and ends up in a conversation with his Amazon Alexa.

== Production ==
Albert Brooks guest-starred as Greg, marking his eleventh appearance on the series, and his ninth character, including his role in The Simpsons Movie. As per usual, he is credited as "A. Brooks". Maurice LaMarche guest-starred as a Fred Flintstone look-alike.

== Cultural references ==
In one scene of the episode, a young Comic Book Guy (played by Hank Azaria) watches the movie Howard the Duck (1986) produced by George Lucas. This episode mocks other Fox shows like Family Guy and American Dad! Additionally, in one scene, a character resembling Fred Flintstone appears, referencing that these shows originated from the same sitcom concept as The Flintstones.

== Reception ==
=== Viewing figures ===
The episode earned a 0.25 rating and was watched by 1.05 million viewers, which was the most-watched show on Fox that night.

=== Critical response ===
Marcus Gibson of Bubbleblabber gave the episode a 4.5 out of 10. He highlighted the performance of Albert Brooks but thought the plot of people going to camp to change themselves was a repetitive plot from previous episodes. He also thought the portrayal of masculinity in the episode was "disappointing". Mike Celestino of Laughing Place also highlighted the performance by Brooks. Although he liked the jokes, he thought the plot was weak. Marisa Roffman of Give Me My Remote "wanted a little bit more from this episode". She also thought the plot of the males going to a camp was repetitive.

JM McNab of Cracked.com liked that the episode answered the question of the whereabouts of Maya, Moe's fiancée whom he met in the season 20 episode "Eeny Teeny Maya Moe" and got engaged to in season 33's "The Wayz We Were." Nick Valdez of Comicbook.com also praised her return, which was due to Maya inviting her to the cabin and the two still being engaged and planning to get married. He concluded, "With Maya's return in the new episode, The Simpsons confirms, thankfully, that they haven't kept this story to themselves. Moe getting married would be a big change, but it's been made clear that it probably won't change him much compared to his previous character." Valdez also praised Albert Brooks' performance as Greg, which he considered a significant improvement over other roles such as Dr. Raufbold in "Bull-E" and Tad Spangler in "The Heartbroke Kid." Even so, he said Brooks didn't quite reach the level of Hank Scorpio in the season eight episode "You Only Move Twice."

Nick Valdez of Comicbook.com ranked the episode 12th on his list, "Every Episode of The Simpsons Season 37, Ranked Worst to Best." He said, "It's not exactly groundbreaking for the show, but it does include some fun nods to the status quo, like the return of Moe's partner, Maya, who had been missing for years."
