= Simpsley =

- The Simpsons episode
- Directed by: Debbie Bruce Mahan
- Written by: Cesar Mazariegos
- Production code: 36ABF19
- Original release date: July 3, 2026

Episode chronology
| ← Previous "Extreme Makeover: Homer Edition" | Next → "Yellow Mirror" |

"Simpsley" is the second special of the thirty-seventh season of the American animated television series The Simpsons, and the 808th episode overall. It was released exclusively on the streaming service Disney+ on July 3, 2026. The special was written by Cesar Mazariegos and was directed by Debbie Bruce Mahan.

In this episode, Marge and Homer try to live a rich lifestyle in Italy after befriending a rich American. The episode received positive reviews.

== Plot ==
In an alternate reality, poor Marge Bouvier works at a spa for the rich. She steals Luann's checkbook and overhears that Agnes' son, Seymour, is living in Italy and would pay someone to bring him home. Marge uses Luann's checks to appear rich and befriends Agnes, who asks her to bring Seymour home.

In Italy, Marge befriends Seymour but finds him with his houseguest and muse, Homer Simpsley, who is also using Seymour for his money. Marge and Homer compete for Seymour's favor, but Marge wins his attention. Two months later, Homer has become jealous of Marge. He pretends to be Seymour by wearing his clothes. When he sees this, Seymour tells Homer to leave, but he has an accident and dies.

Homer and Marge conspire to continue living a rich lifestyle by having Homer pretend to be Seymour. They throw Seymour's body into the sea and write a letter to Agnes saying that Seymour has married Marge. Later, Seymour's body washes ashore, but the police conclude the body is Homer's after interviewing Marge. However, Homer did not like that Marge insulted his intelligence while talking to the police. Afterwards, they are visited by Seymour's friend, Gary Chalmers. When he discovers that Homer and Marge are doing, she kills him with a drink laced with rat poison. They throw Chalmers' valuables in the trash, and Homer also strangles a boy who witnesses them disposing of the body. The police find the bodies and interrogate Homer and Marge. They are about to get Homer to confess until they arrest a man trying to sell Chalmers' valuables.

Homer and Marge fall in love with each other and rent a boat to celebrate. As they have a drink, Marge bludgeons Homer to death to prevent any possibility of losing her rich lifestyle. However, she sees that Homer poisoned Marge's drink. She is impressed but also dies. A letter is delivered to their door saying that Agnes died after reading the Seymour got married and that her fortune now belongs to them.

== Development ==
The episode was announced in May 2026 as one of three exclusive episodes for Disney+. This was a change to the episode format which included the episode Yellow Mirror, a parody of Black Mirror.

== Cultural references ==
The story is a parody of the 2024 television miniseries Ripley. The Netflix series is an adaptation of The Talented Mr. Ripley by Patricia Highsmith. The protagonist role, which is gender swapped, is played by Marge.

== Reception ==
Marcus Gibson of Bubbleblabber gave the episode an 8 out of 10. He liked this episode more than the previous special since its plot did not rely on previously used storylines. He also liked the commentary about class and wealth and the black-and-white animation.

Mike Celestino of Laughing Place liked the story's Ripley parody. He also liked the animation and the more violent depictions in black-and-white.

The episode was described as noir. A reviewer in Absolute Geeks said it "balances genuine noir tension with classic Simpsons absurdity".
