= Yellow Mirror =

- The Simpsons episode
- Directed by: Matthew Faughnan
- Written by: Carolyn Omine; Kai Omine
- Production code: 36ABF22
- Original release date: August 26, 2026

Guest appearances
- Patti Harrison as Hailey; Demi Moore as Lydia; Kai Omine as Sideshow Mel Cosplayer; David Silverman as himself

Episode features
- Chalkboard gag: "I did not predict any of this crap!"

Episode chronology
← Previous "Simpsley"	Next → "The Children's Book Job"

"Yellow Mirror" is the third special of the thirty-seventh season of the American animated television series The Simpsons, and the 809th episode overall. It was released exclusively on the streaming service Disney+ on August 26, 2026. The special was written by Carolyn Omine and Kai Omine and was directed by Matthew Faughnan.

In this episode, Homer learns his life so far was just a dream, and Maggie becomes addicted to watching videos on a tablet computer. Patti Harrison and Demi Moore guest starred. The episode received positive reviews.

== Plot ==
=== The Way We Wasn't ===
When the power goes out, Marge recalls how she met Homer in high school. (Note: As depicted in the second season episode "The Way We Was") Homer notices the lamp glowing. Later, Homer reaches for the lamp and wakes up in the high school bathroom with Principal Dondelinger shining a light in his eyes. Barney tells Homer how they went to the bathroom to smoke. When Dondelinger catches them, Homer swallows the cigarettes but knocks himself unconscious. Later, he tells Barney he dreamed about how he was married to Marge and had kids when he was unconscious. When he thinks he is about to meet Marge, the girl, while attracted to him, has a different voice and says her name is Lydia, which disappoints Homer.

Six years later, Barney sees Homer crying. Homer lies that he is sad about the cancellation of Starsky & Hutch. Barney tells him to fondly remember the episodes, which inspires Homer to animate his experiences from his other life as television episodes. Thirty years later, he has a successful animated series called The Sadsons but has become disillusioned. At a convention, he drunkenly attacks a fan for suggesting a terrible episode idea, and he later takes a prop lamp home. Barney is angry that Homer is wishing for the other life. Homer attempts to plug in the lamp but is electrocuted and goes into a coma. Barney notices Homer is smiling because he has returned to his other life.

=== I Have No Tablet But I Must Stream ===
When Maggie makes a mess, Marge uses a tablet to distract her with videos. However, she becomes cranky if Marge takes the tablet away. The videos brainwash Maggie into obeying the artificial intelligence in the tablet's operating system. Marge notices all the babies in town have the same addiction, so she unsuccessfully tries to destroy the tablet. The AI tells Maggie how to get her family unconscious with sleeping pills, so it can use Maggie to infiltrate computer systems and take over the town.

When the Simpsons wake up, their phones tell them to go to town hall where it traps the adults and keeps the babies distracted. The AI reveals it was told to distract the babies but the adults prevented its task by taking away the tablets, so it imprisoned them. When Maggie becomes fussy because the AI cannot make her nap, it makes Marge calm her down. Lisa convinces the AI to take a break. Although Marge shames it for taking a break from Maggie like she did, the AI leaves. The Simpsons go home but spend time by themselves instead of together.

== Production ==
Demi Moore guest starred as Lydia, who was initially promoted as a "fake Marge".

== Cultural references ==
The structure of the special and the title are a parody of the anthology television series Black Mirror.

The title of the second story, "I Have No Tablet But I Must Stream", is a parody of Harlan Ellison's famous science fiction short story "I Have No Mouth, and I Must Scream".

== Reception ==
Marcus Gibson of Bubbleblabber gave the episode 8.5 out of 10. He thought it was the best special of the season and liked the second story more because of its relevance in the era in which it was shown. He wanted the first story to have more emotional depth.

Daniel Kurland of Bloody Disgusting gave the episode a 3.5 out of 5. He preferred the first story over the second due to its emotional depth and the depiction of Homer becoming a Matt Groening parody. He thought the second story was too straightforward for a Black Mirror parody.

Marisa Roffman of Give Me My Remote thought the first story was "beyond brilliant and bittersweet" and made her emotional. She thought the second story was a "spiritual sequel" to the twenty-seventh season episode "The Girl Code".
