= Estranger Things =

- The Simpsons episode
- Episode no.: Season 36; Episode 18
- Directed by: Matthew Nastuk
- Written by: Tim Long
- Production code: 36ABF11
- Original air date: May 18, 2025

Guest appearances
- Zooey Deschanel as Quirk Girl; Max Greenfield as Schultz; Sarah McLachlan as herself

Episode features
- Commentary: Matt Selman: Matt Groening; Zooey Deschanel

Episode chronology
← Previous "Full Heart, Empty Pool"	Next → "Thrifty Ways to Thieve Your Mother"
- The Simpsons season 36

"Estranger Things" is the eighteenth and final episode of the thirty-sixth season of the American animated television series The Simpsons, and the 790th episode overall. It aired in the United States on Fox on May 18, 2025. The episode was written by Tim Long and directed by Matthew Nastuk. The title is a spoof of Stranger Things.

In this episode, Bart and Lisa grow up and drift apart when they stop watching The Itchy & Scratchy Show together. Zooey Deschanel and Max Greenfield guest starred. Singer Sarah McLachlan appeared as herself. The episode received mixed reviews.

== Plot ==
Four years earlier, Bart and Lisa discover The Itchy & Scratchy Show on television and vow to watch it every day. They bond while watching it as they grow older.

In the present, they are horrified when Marge presents Maggie in an Itchy & Scratchy infant bodysuit. Seeing how it is being marketed to babies, they decide to stop watching and separately begin watching different shows on their tablets, which disappoints Marge, who does not want Bart and Lisa to drift apart. She tells them to stay together as they grow up. They agree to consider it, but do not do so when Marge dies, leaving Homer a widower.

Thirty-five years later, Lisa is now the commissioner of the NBA, which is now the women's professional basketball league formerly known as the WNBA. She pays for the cost of Homer living in the retirement home. Scheduled to make a speech at Springfield Elementary School, Lisa returns home. She is denied entry to visit Homer at the retirement home, so she visits her childhood home. Lisa discovers Bart is running an unlicensed retirement home with Homer, Lenny, Carl, and Comic Book Guy living there. Bart claims he is taking good care of them, but Lisa calls him a failure. She complains about him in her speech.

Later, Lenny disappears, so Bart and Lisa search for him and Bart gets him down from a tree. Lisa is impressed, but Bart is mad that he must do the manual labor while Lisa only sends money. At home, Homer is taken by Senior Protective Services because Lisa filed a complaint earlier which further angers Bart.

Homer is being transferred to Florida, which is now a prison for seniors. Overwhelmed, Lisa goes to the attic and discovers a video made by Marge, who tells Bart and Lisa she hopes that they are depending on each other. They reconcile and go to rescue Homer. They find the senior transport bus and play the sound of water running to force the bus to stop at a restroom. They take Homer and bring him home where they watch a reboot of The Itchy & Scratchy Show.

In Heaven, Marge is watching them happily, before it is revealed she is in a relationship with a deceased Ringo Starr.

During the credits, footage of the points where Itchy kills Scratchy are shown.

== Production ==
Writer Tim Long wrote the premise of Bart and Lisa drifting apart based on his own relationship with his sister. Originally, the flash forward would feature Bart and Lisa as teenagers, but executive producer Matt Selman suggested a longer time jump and Marge's death. Long also wanted to do a parody of the scene from the 1999 Pixar film Toy Story 2 featuring Sarah McLachlan's song "When She Loved Me" due to the emotional impact of it on the audience that he observed in the theater. He wanted the parody to feature Itchy and Scratchy but noted the difficulty of writing Itchy & Scratchy cartoons because the ones featured in the past decade were primarily movie parodies. Another writer on the show who was a parent suggested having babies be the reason Bart and Lisa stop watching Itchy & Scratchy.

During the flashback to before Maggie was born, the framed photo of Maggie is shown as usual on the living room wall. This same continuity error appeared in the season six episode "And Maggie Makes Three."

Starting with this episode, Kelly Macleod began voicing the character of Milhouse Van Houten. Macleod previously appeared as a different character in the thirty-third season episode "Bart the Cool Kid".

Zooey Deschanel guest starred as Quirk Girl and Max Greenfield guest starred as Schultz. Deschanel previously appeared on the series as Mary Spuckler. Singer Sarah McLachlan appeared as herself.

== Cultural references ==
Zooey Deschanel and Max Greenfield's characters are parodies of their characters from the television series New Girl, which aired on Fox.

Bart is seen watching a show on a tablet titled Screaming Friends, a parody of Adult Swim's Smiling Friends. Series creators Michael Cusack and Zach Hadel responded positively to the parody.

== Reception ==
=== Viewing figures ===
The episode earned a 0.13 rating and was watched by 0.54 million viewers, which was the second-most watched show on Fox that night. It is the lowest viewed episode of the series.

=== Critical response ===
John Schwarz of Bubbleblabber gave the episode a 7 out of 10. He thought the episode showed that episodes set in the future were no longer special. He also thought the Itchy & Scratchy premise and reboot reflected on what the series is now trying to do with its long run. Mike Celestino of Laughing Place thought the episode was "a really solid outing". He highlighted the Toy Story 2 parody and the guest stars.

Marisa Roffman of Give Me My Remote thought the episode was "surprisingly touching" and liked that The Itchy & Scratchy Show was used as the cause of the drift. Nick Valdez of Comicbook.com ranked the episode number 1 on his list of all the episodes of the season. He considered it one of the best episodes in a long time as "Not only does it give new emotional context to Bart and Lisa's love for The Itchy & Scratchy Show, but it also adds another layer with Marge, who loves watching her two kids bond." He concluded, "It's such a great end to the season that it could almost serve as a grand finale for the series. But for now, The Simpsons will continue to air at least until Season 40."
