= Mayor Quimby =

Fictional character from The Simpsons franchise

- The Simpsons character
- First appearance: "Bart Gets an 'F'"; October 11, 1990
- Created by: David M. Stern
- Based on: Kennedy family, particularly Ted Kennedy and President John F. Kennedy; Diamond Jim Brady (namesake)
- Designed by: Matt Groening
- Voiced by: Dan Castellaneta

In-universe information
- Full name: Joseph Fitzgerald O'Malley Fitzpatrick Culverstone O'Donnell "The Edge" Edward Martin Marshall William Washington Quimby Jr. nicknamed "Diamond Joe",
- Gender: Male
- Occupation: Mayor of Springfield
- Family: Joe Quimby Sr. (father); Rose Quimby (mother); Clovis Quimby (brother)
- Spouses: Beatrice Bouvier; Martha Quimby
- Children: Shirley (daughter); Joe Quimby III (son); 2 unnamed sons; 1 unnamed daughter
- Relatives: Freddy Quimby (nephew); Robert F. Quimby (unspecified)
- Party: Democratic

Mayor "Diamond Joe" Quimby is a recurring character from the animated sitcom television series The Simpsons. He is voiced by Dan Castellaneta, and first appeared in the episode "Bart Gets an 'F'". Quimby is the corrupt mayor of Springfield, and is a composite parody of U.S. senator Ted Kennedy and certain other members of the Kennedy family who have entered politics.

== Concept and creation ==
Joe Quimby is a parody of Massachusetts Senator Ted Kennedy and the Kennedy family. Like the Kennedys, Quimby is of Irish descent, "speaks with a Boston accent, throws money at political problems, and vacations in a coastal resort called the 'Quimby Compound'". Dan Castellaneta voices Quimby with a Boston elite accent, resulting in a voice reminiscent of that of President John F. Kennedy. His nickname is a reference to Diamond Jim Brady.

== Appearances ==
Quimby has long served as the mayor of the city of Springfield. He appears as a slick, opportunistic politician whose chief priorities seem to be keeping himself in office and various other forms of corruption, including embezzling tax money, taking bribes from Fat Tony, and giving monthly kickbacks to Police Chief Wiggum. The seal on the wall of his office reads "Corruptus in Extremis", which means "extremely corrupt". He is a Democrat.

Like Kennedy, Quimby is known as a womanizer, and occasionally amuses himself with pornographic playing cards during town meetings. Quimby was once the subject of 27 separate paternity suits. One of the women he impregnated is Cookie Kwan, whose baby is remarkably similar to Quimby in both looks and mannerisms. Quimby also is frequently noticed in bed with the same or similar blonde woman/women, at least one of whom was Miss Springfield. He also once accidentally courted his own niece, which is one of the few things Quimby has ever shown shame over.

Despite being the mayor for such a long time, Quimby does not know or care much about his city, often privately (or even publicly) showing his outright contempt for Springfield's citizens. He frequently takes overseas vacations, which take him out of town for extended periods of time, leading to the headline "Mayor Visits City" in the Springfield Shopper. He once referred to Springfield as "Springfeld" at a public meeting. However, he makes frequent, albeit short, public appearances for local festivities, events, business openings, etc.

If bending the law will suit Quimby's purposes, he will likely do so. He once arranged Marge Simpson's release after she was arrested for blocking traffic on a bridge after suffering a nervous breakdown, claiming that if she went to jail, Quimby could kiss the "chick vote" goodbye. He also resorted to bribing witnesses when assault charges were brought against his nephew, leading Bart Simpson to observe that "the system works: just ask Claus von Bülow".

His catchphrase is "Vote Quimby", which he always finds an opportunity to say, even in situations where it would be disadvantageous to identify himself, like inadvertently being caught by Homer in a motel room with his mistress.

Quimby was elected Mayor of Springfield in 1986 (three years before the show's debut) and has been re-elected several times since, despite openly admitting to fraud and wrongdoing. In the season 4 episode "Krusty Gets Kancelled" he admits to using taxpayer dollars to fund the murder of his enemies, but thanks to a clever use of a popular Gabbo catchphrase ("I'm a bad wittle boy"), he is re-elected in a landslide.

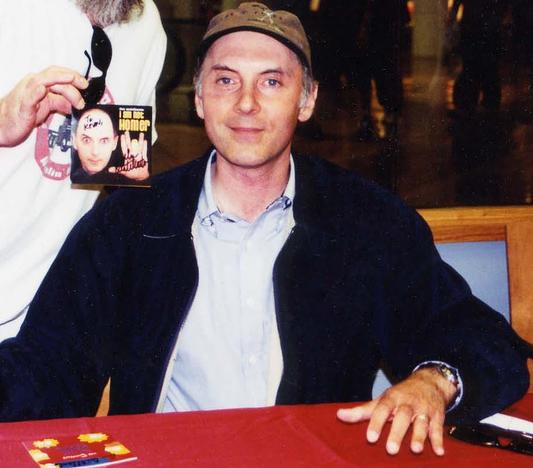
Dan Castellaneta, the voice of Quimby.

Quimby's political stranglehold on Springfield has earned him the hatred of Springfield's small but vocal Republican elite, themselves portrayed as mostly dark, ghoulish figures who meet in a castle. When the Republicans nominate Sideshow Bob as their mayoral candidate, Bob rigs the election, briefly deposing Quimby. He is re-instated when Bob is found guilty of fraud and imprisoned. Later, when Quimby briefly flees the city in the mistaken belief that his corruption is about to be exposed, he is deemed to have "abandoned office" and is replaced by a short-lived "council of learned citizens" headed by Lisa Simpson, Professor Frink, Comic Book Guy, Lindsey Naegle, Dr. Hibbert, and Principal Skinner, the members of the Springfield chapter of Mensa International, in accordance with the town charter. He also survives a recall election, with no candidate in the race against him, garnering the five percent necessary to force a recall.

According to the Season 37 episode "Sashes to Sashes", Quimby's father Joe Quimby, Sr. came to the U.S. from Ireland in 1921, and Mayor Quimby married Marge's aunt Beatrice Bouvier but the marriage ended quickly.

== Reception ==
Literary critic Paul Cantor has cited Mayor Quimby as an example of Springfield's atomistic politics, noting "Mayor Quimby is a demagogue, but at least he is Springfield's own demagogue. When he buys votes, he buys them directly from the citizens of Springfield." During the USA Today contest to choose which Springfield would host the release of The Simpsons Movie, Ted Kennedy himself appears in a video in which he invited "Diamond Joe" Quimby and the film to premiere in Springfield, Massachusetts, and even mocked his own oft-mocked pronunciation of the word "Chowder" (as "Chow-Dah"); however, Springfield, Vermont was chosen instead. On May 17, 2013, following reporting on a new scandal, Justin Peters, crime reporter for Slate magazine, compared the highly corrupt gaffe-plagued Mayor of Toronto Rob Ford to Quimby. Peters prepared a list of 20 outrageous statements, and asked readers to guess which ones were uttered by the fictional Quimby, and which were uttered by the real-life Ford.

== See also ==
- Politics in The Simpsons
