= Eeny Teeny Maya Moe =

- The Simpsons episode
- Moe and Maya
- Episode no.: Season 20; Episode 16
- Directed by: Nancy Kruse
- Written by: John Frink
- Production code: LABF06
- Original air date: April 5, 2009

Episode features
- Couch gag: The family is drawn in on a series of animation cels that flip down onto the screen. Homer is naked until Marge pulls down one last cel that clothes him.

Episode chronology
← Previous "Wedding for Disaster"	Next → "The Good, the Sad and the Drugly"
- The Simpsons season 20

"Eeny Teeny Maya Moe" is the sixteenth episode of the twentieth season of the American animated television series The Simpsons. It originally aired on the Fox network in the United States on April 5, 2009. Moe falls in love with a woman named Maya, whom he met over the Internet. When Moe meets her in person, she turns out to be a little person. They remain in love, but his tactless attitude to her size eventually drives her away. Meanwhile, in an attempt to spend more time with Maggie, Homer inadvertently drops her off at a playground full of bullies.

This episode is best known for making the series surpass The Adventures of Ozzie and Harriet, which had 435 episodes.

== Plot ==
Homer attempts to spend more time with Maggie and ends up bringing her to Moe's Tavern. Moe is cleaning up the bar for a date, and finds out he actually has a window, which was previously obscured by layers of grime. Outside the window is a playground, which Homer sees as an opportunity for watching Maggie while spending time at Moe's. Homer sends Maggie to play with the other babies outside, but they turn out to be ruthless bullies. Marge notices Maggie is uncomfortable when she returns home one day before Kearney's strong, muscular baby can hurt her, and becomes worried that Homer is neglecting her. After watching a commercial about a surveillance camera fixed in the eye of a teddy bear, Marge purchases a spy camera which she attaches to Maggie's hair band and discovers that Maggie is bullied by a group of gangster babies. At first, Marge is surprised to see Maggie being tormented by the babies, but sees Homer, after he discovered the truth about the other babies from the playground, rush to Maggie's rescue, but he is beaten up by Kearney's son. Maggie jumps to Homer's rescue and Homer says that he loves both her and Marge. Moved to tears, Marge tells Homer he is a wonderful father.

Meanwhile, Moe's date, whom he met over the Internet, turns out to be a little person named Maya. Moe still loves her, but is worried about what his friends will think. Moe decides to take Maya on a double date with Marge and Homer, neither of whom seem to care that she is small. Homer, seeing Maya's intelligence and sensitivity, suggests Moe marry her. Moe proposes but cannot resist making jokes about Maya's height. Insulted, she rejects him. Crushed by grief, Moe consults the advice of Lenny and Carl, who advise him to do something risky to win Maya back. Moe decides to have surgery to become shorter, and after Dr. Hibbert tells him that no licensed physician will be able to carry out the surgery he is asking for, Dr. Nick Riviera agrees to conduct it. Maya stops Moe just before the surgery, as she wants someone who sees her as "beautiful" not "short", and who does not need to cut himself down to her size in order to love her. Moe, intent on having the surgery, does not listen to Maya, and she leaves him for good. Homer consoles a dejected Moe, stating that even though things did not go well with Maya, Moe actually found love with a woman who loved him back and that if he was successful once, he will be successful again. Moe brightens up and wonders how a small woman like Maya could make him feel so big.

== Cultural references ==
The title is a parody of the children's rhyme, "Eeny Meeny Miny Moe". Kearney's son banging the three bottles together on his fingers is reference to the 1979 film The Warriors. A play on a theme from one of Philip Glass's scores is heard during the commercial about "leaving your kids unguarded". Moe references people that live in trees, particularly Tarzan and The Berenstain Bears. Also, upon learning that Maya finds him attractive, Moe joyfully utters the nonsense phrase "Oh, frabjulous day, calloo callay!" which is a reference to a similar line in the Lewis Carroll poem "Jabberwocky". When Moe turns on the television in Maya's house, it is showing a scene from Willy Wonka & the Chocolate Factory featuring the Oompa Loompas singing. Maya tells Moe that the photo of herself she shared with Moe over the internet was taken at Legoland. When Moe meets Maya in person he tears down an advertisement for dwarf tossing and throws out a copy of Little Women. Shortly afterwards, he asks Maya "So, have you always been this size, or is this, like, a Benjamin Button deal?". Moe states that he is a snake handler, which was previously mentioned in the 1992 episode "Homer the Heretic".

== Reception ==
Since airing, the episode has received mostly positive reviews from television critics.

Robert Canning from IGN gave the episode a 7.6/10 in his review and said when Homer consoled Moe about getting broken up with, it was "a sweet way to end this enjoyable episode".

Erich Asperschlager of TV Verdict wrote: "Spending too much time away from the family has always been tricky for The Simpsons. Letting minor characters shine can be fun, but let’s face it: people tune in to watch the Simpsons, not the Szyslaks, or the Flanderses, or the Leonard-Carlsons. Then again, spending too much time with the family can be exhausting. This week, The Simpsons hit a nice middle ground, spending most of the episode on Moe’s short-lived relationship but backing it up with a Homer-Maggie-Marge B-plot. Neither story soared to great heights, but 'Eeny Teeny Maya Moe' was a solid entry in a (thus far) solid season."

Hank Azaria was nominated for a Primetime Emmy Award for Emmy Award for Outstanding Voice-Over Performance for his role as Moe Szyslak in this episode, but lost to fellow Simpsons cast member Dan Castellaneta for "Father Knows Worst".

John Frink was nominated for a Writers Guild of America Award in the Animation category in 2010 for writing the episode. The Simpsons was the only show to be nominated in the category, with the other nominated episodes being "The Burns and the Bees", "Take My Life, Please", "Gone Maggie Gone" and "Wedding for Disaster". The last one was the winner.
