= Gone Maggie Gone =

- The Simpsons episode
- Homer trying to fool Marge after he loses Maggie.
- Episode no.: Season 20; Episode 13
- Directed by: Chris Clements
- Written by: Billy Kimball; Ian Maxtone-Graham
- Production code: LABF04
- Original air date: March 15, 2009

Guest appearance
- Ed Begley Jr. as himself

Episode features
- Couch gag: The couch is a piñata. A blindfolded Ralph hits it, and the family falls out.

Episode chronology
← Previous "No Loan Again, Naturally"	Next → "In the Name of the Grandfather"
- The Simpsons season 20

"Gone Maggie Gone" is the thirteenth episode of the twentieth season of the American animated television series The Simpsons. It originally aired on the Fox network in the United States on March 15, 2009. The episode was written by both Billy Kimball and longtime Simpsons writer Ian Maxtone-Graham, and directed by Chris Clements. In the episode, Homer leaves Maggie on the doorstep of a convent, but when she disappears, Lisa goes undercover as a nun to solve the mystery and find her. Meanwhile, Homer tries to keep Maggie's disappearance a secret from Marge, who was temporarily blinded while watching a solar eclipse.

== Plot ==
The Simpsons are excited for a solar eclipse over Springfield. After Homer's camera obscura breaks, Marge gives up her own. As the family expresses delight at seeing the eclipse, Marge takes a peek, which blinds her. Dr. Hibbert informs the family that Marge's eyes must be covered for two weeks, and she must not be put under any stress. After a rat infestation, Homer takes Maggie and Santa's Little Helper to buy rat poison. On the way home the baby and the dog's bickering causes the car to fall off a bridge. Homer tries to get them all across a lake in a small boat. He first takes Maggie across and puts her on the doorstep of a convent, where the nuns take her in and refuse to give her back.

While Homer hides the truth from Marge, Lisa goes undercover as a nun and infiltrates the convent. When Mother Superior refuses to tell her where Maggie is, Lisa discovers that they are seeking a jewel. The first clue is to "seek God with heart and soul," which she accomplishes by playing a few measures of the song by the same name on an organ, activating a Rube Goldberg-type contraption. The next clue to find the "biggest man-made ring" in Springfield; after considering circular rings, she believes the biggest "ring" is in the Springfield Bell Tower. Arriving there, she meets Comic Book Guy and Principal Skinner, who tell her that St. Teresa of Ávila had a deathbed vision of a jewel that would bring peace and harmony to the world. The gem will be revealed on the first full moon after a solar eclipse, which is that night. However, the bell is actually papier-mâché, so they conclude that the answer is the RING in the Springfield Sign.

When they arrive, they are met by Mr. Burns and Smithers, who are also looking for the gem. Lisa finds writing on the letters of the sign, "Great crimes kill holy sage", and unscrambles a message that reads "Regally, the rock gem is Lisa". Mr. Burns takes the others back to the convent where Lisa announces that she is the gem child. However, Mother Superior tells her that the gem child is Maggie and rearranges the message into "It's really Maggie, Sherlock". Maggie is put on a throne, creating a rainbow that brings peace over Springfield. Marge suddenly bursts in and takes Maggie back, and her eyes are healed upon seeing Maggie. On the way home she asks Homer if she was being selfish, but he says that he found a replacement child; Bart assumes the role of the "gem child", and the paradise turns into a living Hell.

== Cultural references ==
- The main plot of this episode parodies National Treasure and The Da Vinci Code. For example, the bell in the tower turning out to be the wrong one was a scene in National Treasure, regarding the Liberty Bell. For The Da Vinci Code, the Holy Grail turned out to be Mary Magdalene, and Sophie was the last remaining heir to the Christ bloodline; whereas in this episode, the gem turns out to be Maggie. In another reference to The Da Vinci Code, Mr. Burns calls Smithers his loyal albino servant, a reference to Silas from The Da Vinci Code. The large portion of the first part of the episode involving the rats was an homage to Ratatouille. The song that is played when Lisa walks into the monastery is "O Fortuna". Bart turning everything to Hell is an homage to The Omen. The title references the movie Gone Baby Gone.
- The clue "Great crimes kill holy sage" is quite possibly a reference to the fallout from the Catholic Church sexual abuse cases.
- The battle depicted in the American Revolution flashback is the Battle of Lexington at Lexington Common with the historic Buckman Tavern in the background.

== Reception ==
The episode was well received by television critics.

Robert Canning of IGN said: "as entertaining as the story was, it would not have made a difference if it weren't just as equally funny. I laughed throughout the retelling of the legend of St. Theresa, which included pirate nuns and a fake war for independence. Mr. Burns referring to Smithers as his albino was another hilarious bit. Overall, it was the combination of a fully engaging story and great laughs that made ‘Gone, Maggie, Gone’ another winner for The Simpsons in their post-hi-def series run."

Steve Heisler of The A.V. Club gave the episode an A− stating, "It's been a long time since the show has done something fresh, and I think this is about as good as it's gonna get for a while—even if the episode took a while to get going."

TV Verdict's Erich Asperschlager said: "Part Da Vinci Code, part National Treasure, and part Professor Layton, ‘Gone Maggie Gone’ shakes up the Simpsons formula in a fun way by introducing one of those American-history-conspiracy-theory-cult-mysteries that are so popular with the kids, as well as those brain-bending-word-and-logic-puzzles that aren’t. ‘Gone Maggie Gone’ is one of the best so far this season."

The episode was nominated for Primetime Emmy Awards for Outstanding Animated Program (for Programming Less Than One Hour) and Outstanding Music Composition for a Series. It lost both awards, to the South Park episode "Margaritaville" and Legend of the Seeker, respectively.

It was also nominated for the Annie Award for "Best Writing in an Animated Television Production."

Billy Kimball and Ian Maxtone-Graham were nominated for a Writers Guild of America Award in the Animation category in 2010 for writing the episode. The Simpsons was the only show to be nominated in the category, with the other nominated episodes being "The Burns and the Bees", "Eeny Teeny Maya Moe", "Take My Life, Please" and "Wedding for Disaster" (the winner).
