= The Simpsons season 20 =

Season of television series

The Simpsons
- Season 20
- DVD cover
- Showrunner: Al Jean
- No. of episodes: 21

Release
- Original network: Fox
- Original release: September 28, 2008 – May 17, 2009

Season chronology
- ← Previous; Season 19 Next → Season 21

The twentieth season of the American animated sitcom The Simpsons aired on Fox between September 28, 2008, and May 17, 2009. The season was produced by Gracie Films and 20th Century Fox Television. The showrunner for the season was Al Jean. With this season, the show tied Gunsmoke as the longest-running American primetime television series in terms of total number of seasons. The season was released on Blu-ray on January 12, 2010, making this the first season to be released on Blu-ray as well as the only one to contain both 16:9 widescreen and high-definition episodes. It was released on DVD in Region 1 on January 12, 2010, and in Region 4 on January 20, 2010. The season was only released on DVD in Region 2 on September 17, 2010, in a few areas.

== Voice cast & characters ==
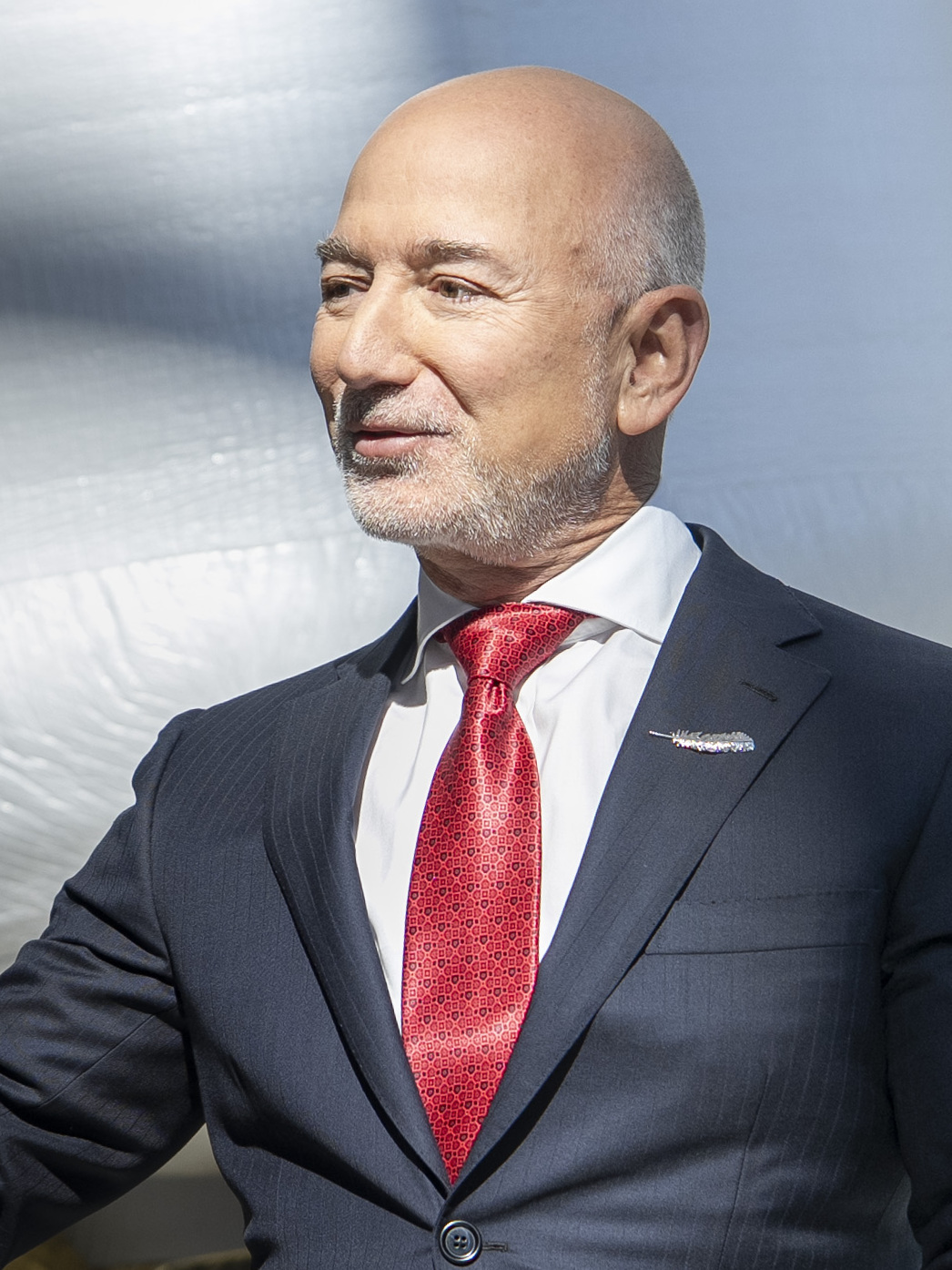
Amazon founder and CEO Jeff Bezos plays himself in "The Burns and the Bees".

=== Main cast ===
- Dan Castellaneta as Homer Simpson, Mayor Quimby, The Leprechaun, Barney Gumble, Rich Texan, Groundskeeper Willie, Krusty the Clown, Sideshow Mel, Santa's Little Helper, Grampa Simpson, Blue-Haired Lawyer, Squeaky-Voiced Teen, Mr. Teeny, Gil Gunderson, Louie, and various others
- Julie Kavner as Marge Simpson, Patty Bouvier, and Selma Bouvier
- Nancy Cartwright as Bart Simpson, Nelson Muntz, Kearney Zzyzwicz, Ralph Wiggum, and various others
- Yeardley Smith as Lisa Simpson
- Hank Azaria as Moe Szyslak, Chief Wiggum, Snake, Superintendent Chalmers, Apu Nahasapeemapetilon, Carl Carlson, Disco Stu, Officer Lou, Comic Book Guy, Old Jewish Man, Cletus Spuckler, Wiseguy, Julio, Professor Frink, Bumblebee Man, Luigi Risotto, Coach Krupt, Sea Captain, Dr. Nick Riviera, Kirk Van Houten, Johnny Tightlips, Chazz Busby, Duffman, Ron Rabinowitz, and various others
- Harry Shearer as Mr. Burns, Judge Snyder, Ned Flanders, Principal Skinner, Dr. Hibbert, Rainier Wolfcastle, Lenny Leonard, Waylon Smithers, Scratchy, Otto Mann, Kent Brockman, Principal Dondelinger, Reverend Lovejoy, Jasper Beardsley, Marty, Dewey Largo, Officer Eddie, and various others

=== Supporting cast ===
- Tress MacNeille as Agnes Skinner, Dolph Shapiro, Brandine Spuckler, Lindsey Naegle, Cookie Kwan, Lewis, Mrs. Muntz, Crazy Cat Lady, Bernice Hibbert, Manjula Nahasapeemapetilon, Shauna Chalmers, Lunchlady Dora, and various others
- Karl Wiedergott as additional characters
- Pamela Hayden as Milhouse Van Houten, Jimbo Jones, Janey Powell, and various others
- Russi Taylor as Wendell Borton, Martin Prince, Sherri, Terri, and various others
- Maggie Roswell as Maude Flanders, Helen Lovejoy, Luann Van Houten, Elizabeth Hoover, and various others

=== Special guest cast ===
Guest stars for the season included:

- Marcia Wallace as Edna Krabappel (4 episodes)
- Maurice LaMarche as Cap'n Crunch, Trix Rabbit, Toucan Sam and various other voices (3 episodes)
- Julia Louis-Dreyfus as Gloria
  ("Sex, Pies and Idiot Scrapes")
- Robert Forster as Lucky Jim
  ("Sex, Pies and Idiot Scrapes")
- Joe Mantegna as Fat Tony
  ("Sex, Pies and Idiot Scrapes")
- Denis Leary as himself
  ("Lost Verizon")
- Brian Grazer as himself
  ("Lost Verizon")
- Joe Montana as himself
  ("Double, Double, Boy in Trouble")
- Merl Reagle as himself
  ("Homer and Lisa Exchange Cross Words")
- Will Shortz as himself
  ("Homer and Lisa Exchange Cross Words")
- Scott Thompson as Grady
  ("Homer and Lisa Exchange Cross Words")
- Shohreh Aghdashloo as Mina
  ("Mypods and Broomsticks")
- Mark Cuban as himself
  ("The Burns and the Bees")
- Jeff Bezos as himself
  ("The Burns and the Bees")
- Marv Albert as himself
  ("The Burns and the Bees")
- Emily Blunt as Juliet Hobbes
  ("Lisa the Drama Queen")
- Fall Out Boy as themselves
  ("Lisa the Drama Queen")
- Ed Begley Jr. as himself
  ("Gone Maggie Gone")
- Colm Meaney as Tom O'Flanagan
  ("In the Name of the Grandfather")
- Glen Hansard as Street musician
  ("In the Name of the Grandfather")
- Markéta Irglová as Eastern European woman
  ("In the Name of the Grandfather")
- Kelsey Grammer as Sideshow Bob
  ("Wedding for Disaster")
- Anne Hathaway as Jenny
  ("The Good, the Sad and the Drugly").
- Elliot Page as Alaska Nebraska
  ("Waverly Hills, 9-0-2-1-D'oh") (credited as Ellen Page)
- Jodie Foster as Maggie Simpson
  ("Four Great Women and a Manicure")

== Episodes ==
No. overall	No. in season	Title	Directed by	Written by	Original release date	Prod. code	U.S. viewers (millions)
421	1	"Sex, Pies and Idiot Scrapes"	Lance Kramer	Kevin Curran	September 28, 2008	KABF17	9.47
After being bailed out of jail for starting a brawl at an alcohol-free St. Patrick's Day parade, Homer becomes a bounty hunter and tags Flanders along for the ride. Flanders quits after Homer dangerously pursues a bounty. When Homer skips his hearing, Flanders chases after Homer, but they reconcile after they get trapped together. Meanwhile, an Irish man gives Marge a job at his bakery, which Marge soon discovers specializes in sexually suggestive cakes. When Homer is sentenced for a short stay in prison, Marge sends him a cake to help him get through it. Guest Stars: Julia Louis-Dreyfus, Robert Forster and Joe Mantegna.
422	2	"Lost Verizon"	Raymond S. Persi	John Frink	October 5, 2008	KABF15	7.41
Bart feels left out after realizing he is the only kid in this day and age without a cell phone, so he tries to work in a country club as a golf ball finder to earn money for it and finds Denis Leary's phone instead. He uses it for mischief until Marge secretly activates the phone's tracking and filtering capabilities to monitor Bart. Lisa informs Bart, who ties the phone's tracker to a bird. Worried, the family follows the bird to Machu Picchu, where Marge has a dream that teaches her to let Bart care for himself, while Bart remains at home. Returning home, Marge and Bart reconcile. Guest Stars: Denis Leary and Brian Grazer. Note: This episode was dedicated to Paul Newman.
423	3	"Double, Double, Boy in Trouble"	Nancy Kruse	Bill Odenkirk	October 19, 2008	KABF14	8.16
When Lenny wins the lottery and invites the Simpsons to a party at the Woosterfield Hotel, Bart meets Simon Woosterfield, a boy who looks exactly like him and is a member of Springfield's richest family. As a prank, the two decide to switch places, but the joke is on Bart when he discovers that Simon is being targeted for murder by his own siblings. When Lisa discovers who Simon is, and he tells the Simpsons about his family, they go and rescue Bart. The two boys return to their own families. Guest Star: Joe Montana.
424	4	"Treehouse of Horror XIX"	Bob Anderson	Matt Warburton	November 2, 2008	KABF16	12.40
Intro: Homer tries to vote for Barack Obama but the machine is rigged to place votes for John McCain—and kill anyone who reveals it. Untitled Robot Parody: In this light parody of Transformers, Lisa gets a Malibu Stacy car that turns into a robot bent on fighting the mortal enemy of his race (more transforming robots). How to Get Ahead in Dead-Vertising: After accidentally killing Krusty the Clown over the destruction of a daycare mural that used his image without his express permission, Homer is hired by two ad agents who have discovered a legal loophole in using celebrity likenesses in their advertising campaigns. It's the Grand Pumpkin, Milhouse: In this parody of It's the Great Pumpkin, Charlie Brown, Milhouse summons a demon pumpkin, who goes berserk when he discovers that humans carve his brethren into jack-o-lanterns as Halloween tradition.
425	5	"Dangerous Curves"	Matthew Faughnan	Billy Kimball & Ian Maxtone-Graham	November 9, 2008	KABF18	8.01
As the Simpsons drive to a cabin in the woods, Homer and Marge remember their love life. Twenty years earlier, Homer and Marge meet Ned and Maude on their honeymoon, and they are forced to sleep in separate rooms to avoid premarital sex. Ned encourages Homer to marry Marge, and he carves their names into a tree. Five years earlier, Homer and Marge nearly have affairs with Sylvia and Alberto but keep it a secret from each other. At the cabin, the Simpsons meet Alberto and Sylvia, who are now married, and learn of their secrets. When Homer sees the names he carved into the tree, he cuts it out and reconciles with Marge. Guest Star: Maurice LaMarche.
426	6	"Homer and Lisa Exchange Cross Words"	Nancy Kruse	Tim Long	November 16, 2008	KABF19	8.48
Lisa becomes obsessed with crossword puzzles and enters a tournament. Meanwhile, Homer earns money from helping couples break up. At the tournament, Homer bets his money on Lisa and wins. Learning Lisa is unsure about the final round, he bets against her and wins again when she loses. Angry that Homer bet against her, she disowns him. To apologize, Homer commissions a New York Times crossword with his apology written in the clues and solution, and the two reconcile. Guest Stars: Will Shortz, Merl Reagle and Scott Thompson.
427	7	"MyPods and Boomsticks"	Steven Dean Moore	Marc Wilmore	November 30, 2008	KABF20	7.80
Bart makes friends with a Muslim boy named Bashir and his family, but Homer fears the family may be terrorists because of their religion. When he discovers that Bashir's father has explosives and plans to the Springfield Mall, he tries to stop him even though he really works in building demolition, causing Homer to accidentally blow up a bridge. The Simpsons hold an apology party for Bashir's family. Meanwhile, Lisa is given a MyPod and becomes addicted to downloading songs on it. When Lisa is unable to afford all the songs she downloaded, she is forced to hand out flyers for the MyPod as payment. Guest Star: Shohreh Aghdashloo.
428	8	"The Burns and the Bees"	Mark Kirkland	Stephanie Gillis	December 7, 2008	KABF21	6.43
After winning the Austin Celtics basketball team in a game of poker, Mr. Burns intends to build a new arena for the team in Springfield. Meanwhile, Lisa cares for a bee colony to save honeybees from extinction and finds a greenhouse where they can live. When Burns destroys the greenhouse for his arena, Homer and Moe mate the bees with Africanized bees so they can survive anywhere. They are released but go and inhabit the arena, and it is declared a bee sanctuary. Guest Stars: Mark Cuban, Jeff Bezos and Marv Albert.
429	9	"Lisa the Drama Queen"	Matthew Nastuk	Brian Kelley	January 25, 2009	KABF22	5.74
Lisa meets a new girl named Juliet and helps her write stories about a fantasy world called Equalia, but spending too much time with Juliet and the story begins to warp Lisa's sense of reality. They run away to an abandoned restaurant to finish writing their story. After escaping the bullies who use the restaurant as their hang out, Lisa wants to live in the real world while Juliet wants to be in the fantasy world. Later, a publisher rejects Lisa's story. Guest Stars: Emily Blunt and Fall Out Boy. Note: This is the last episode to be broadcast in standard definition, the last episode to include the old opening (which had been used since season two), and the first episode to begin immediately after the credits without a commercial break.
430	10	"Take My Life, Please"	Steven Dean Moore	Don Payne	February 15, 2009	LABF01	6.73
After an old high school rival named Vance is honored on the Springfield Wall of Fame, Homer becomes depressed when he discovers that Principal Dondelinger rigged the student council election so Vance would win. While at an Italian restaurant, a mysterious chef shows Homer how his life would have turned out had he actually won. He sees that he would have been rich and married to Marge but with no kids, and Homer becomes depressed. Later, Marge takes Homer to the Wall of Fame and shows that she forced Dondelinger to add Homer's name to the wall. After a boy takes a picture with him, Homer becomes happier. Note: This is the first episode to broadcast in 720p high definition and to use the new opening (which is similar to the old one, only it includes new characters and slight changes to some of the sequences).
431	11	"How the Test Was Won"	Lance Kramer	Michael Price	March 1, 2009	LABF02	6.53
Bart gets a perfect score on Springfield Elementary's latest standardized practice test, leaving Lisa worried that Bart may be smarter than her. Bart is rewarded with a field trip with other students that turns out to be an elaborate trick into getting the low-testing students and Principal Skinner out of the way. When Ralph gets into trouble and Skinner uses physics to rescue him, the students become interested in learning. Lisa, distracted by Bart's achievement, cannot concentrate during the real test, but Skinner returns and cancels the test. Meanwhile, Homer forgets to mail off his insurance payment and must keep himself and the house accident-free until his coverage can be reinstated at 3:00pm.
432	12	"No Loan Again, Naturally"	Mark Kirkland	Jeff Westbrook	March 8, 2009	LABF03	5.96
The Simpsons get into a mortgage crisis of their own when Homer cannot afford to pay off the money he borrows from his home equity loan so he can finance his extravagant Mardi Gras parties. The house is sold at auction to Ned Flanders after he feels sorry for them, and he lets them stay as renters. Flanders tires of their constant requests for repairs, so Homer calls him a slumlord. Flanders evicts the Simpsons, and they go to a homeless shelter. While interviewing new tenants, Flanders is reminded of the Simpsons' admiration of him and allows them to return. Guest Star: Maurice LaMarche.
433	13	"Gone Maggie Gone"	Chris Clements	Billy Kimball & Ian Maxtone-Graham	March 15, 2009	LABF04	6.03
Marge goes blind after viewing an eclipse without an eclipse shoe box viewer. While caring for Maggie, Homer accidentally leaves Maggie on the doorstep of a convent, and the nuns refuse to return her. Homer tries to cover up Maggie's disappearance from Marge while Lisa goes undercover as a nun to find her. They refuse to tell Lisa where Maggie is but learn they are looking for a jewel. After solving a series of clues, she learns that Maggie is the jewel. At that moment, Marge enters the convent and takes back Maggie. Guest Star: Ed Begley, Jr.
434	14	"In the Name of the Grandfather"	Ralph Sosa	Matt Marshall	March 22, 2009	LABF11	6.19
After forgetting to visit Grampa while relaxing in a hot tub, Homer makes it up to him by taking him to a pub in Ireland, only to learn that pubs are not popular in Ireland anymore. While Marge and the kids visit Irish landmarks, while Homer and Grampa get drunk and accidentally buy the pub. To increase business, they allow smoking in the pub, which is illegal, until the police shut them down, and they are deported from Ireland. Guest Stars: Colm Meaney, Glen Hansard and Markéta Irglová.
435	15	"Wedding for Disaster"	Chuck Sheetz	Joel H. Cohen	March 29, 2009	LABF05	6.62
When Reverend Lovejoy reveals to Homer and Marge that they are not legally married, Homer and Marge decide to have another wedding to legitimize their union once and for all. But when Marge begins acting like a bridezilla and Homer mysteriously disappears, it is up to Bart and Lisa to save the day. They discover Homer was kidnapped by Patty and Selma to stop him from marrying Marge. Saddened, Homer reads his wedding vows, which make the twins emotional, so they release him. When Bart and Lisa confront them, they are forced to pay for the wedding so that the kids do not tell their parents. Guest Star: Kelsey Grammer as Sideshow Bob. Note: A rerun of the episode was dedicated to Michael Jackson.
436	16	"Eeny Teeny Maya Moe"	Nancy Kruse	John Frink	April 5, 2009	LABF06	6.50
Moe once again searches for love and falls for a woman named Maya over the Internet. However, when Moe meets Maya face-to-face, he discovers it is more like face-to-knee, as Maya is only three feet tall. When his friends like her, Moe tries to propose but makes fun of her height so she rejects him. Meanwhile, Homer finds a playground outside of Moe's where he can watch Maggie while he is at the bar. She is put in a playground, which has hostile babies. When Marge is worried for Maggie and puts a spy camera in her bow, she sees that Homer protects Maggie from the bullies.
437	17	"The Good, the Sad and the Drugly"	Rob Oliver	Marc Wilmore	April 19, 2009	LABF07	6.58
Bart sets up Milhouse to take the fall for a prank the two of them pulled, and the duo's friendship becomes strained when Bart falls for a charitable girl named Jenny. While Bart tries to be good for Jenny, Milhouse exposes him, and Jenny leaves him. Meanwhile, Lisa becomes insane and depressed after reading Internet articles predicting that Springfield will be a barren wasteland in fifty years, and is given anti-depressants that turn her into a mindless zombie. When she almost injures herself, Marge takes her off the medication. Lisa tells Bart not to worry about certain issues, so he apologizes to Milhouse. Guest Star: Anne Hathaway.
438	18	"Father Knows Worst"	Matthew Nastuk	Rob LaZebnik	April 26, 2009	LABF08	6.01
Homer becomes a stricter parent after meeting a helicopter mom who criticizes Bart for being an academic failure and Lisa for being a social outcast. He helps Bart with a school project while encouraging Lisa to have a party with popular girls. While working on Bart's project, he has a dream where historical figures tell him to let Bart learn from his mistakes. Bart learns the same lesson while Lisa says she does not want to be popular because it is hard work. Meanwhile, Marge discovers a sauna in the basement of their house and shuts herself off from the rest of the world. When Homer thinks he has failed as a father, Marge brings him to the sauna to relax.
439	19	"Waverly Hills, 9-0-2-1-D'oh"	Mike Frank Polcino	J. Stewart Burns	May 3, 2009	LABF10	6.66
While desperately searching for a bathroom during her morning jog, Marge discovers how low-rent Springfield Elementary School really is and moves Bart and Lisa to Waverly Hills Elementary by having Homer rent an apartment there so the city inspector of Waverly Hills does not get suspicious. Meanwhile, Bart helps Lisa become popular at the new school by telling others that Lisa is friends with a teenage pop star named Alaska Nebraska. When Lisa goes to Alaska to ask for tickets to her concert, she is rejected and loses her friends. The kids ask to return to Springfield Elementary, and the parents allow it. Guest Stars: Elliot Page (credited as "Ellen Page") and Maurice LaMarche.
440	20	"Four Great Women and a Manicure"	Raymond S. Persi	Valentina L. Garza	May 10, 2009	LABF09	5.19
While at a nail salon, Marge and Lisa argue over whether or not a woman can be smart, beautiful, and powerful all at once, which leads to yet another Simpsons anthology show, featuring four stories of women trying to survive in a man's world: Aunt Selma defending England as Queen Elizabeth I, Lisa in a non-copyright-infringing retelling of Snow White, Marge pushing Homer to be a great Shakespearean actor in a modern-day version of Macbeth, and Maggie fighting against conformity in a parody of Ayn Rand's The Fountainhead. Guest Star: Jodie Foster.
441	21	"Coming to Homerica"	Steven Dean Moore	Brendan Hay	May 17, 2009	LABF12	5.85
Krusty Burger introduces a vegetarian burger than causes food poisoning. The cause is traced to tainted barley grown in Ogdenville. After the barley industry collapses, the citizens of Ogdenville swarm into Springfield in search of work, but when the Ogdenvillians' Norwegian culture begins rubbing off on others, Mayor Quimby hires citizens to act as a border patrol. They hire the Ogdenvillians to build a border wall to keep them out but miss them when the wall is complete. The Ogdenvillians return since they built a door in the wall.

== Production ==
The season contained nine holdover episodes from season 19’s KABF production line, which all ended up being the nine standard-definition episodes of the season. Al Jean continued his role as showrunner, a role he had since the thirteenth season.

Production on the season was delayed because of contract negotiations with the six main voice actors. The dispute was resolved, and the actors' salary was raised to US$400,000 per episode. The delay in production caused the planned 22 episodes to be shortened to 20. In addition, voice actor Dan Castellaneta was credited as a consulting producer for the first time.

The Simpsons began high-definition production in season 20. The first episode in HD, "Take My Life, Please", aired on February 15, 2009. It is also the first to feature the new opening sequence.

More episodes were given the TV-14 rating than any previous season. The episodes that were given this rating were "Sex, Pies and Idiot Scrapes", "Treehouse of Horror XIX", "Gone Maggie Gone", "No Loan Again, Naturally", "Dangerous Curves", "Wedding for Disaster", and "Four Great Women and a Manicure".

=== 20th anniversary ===
In 2009, to celebrate the 20th anniversary of the premiere of The Simpsons, Fox announced that a year-long celebration of the show titled "Best. 20 Years. Ever." would run from January 14, 2009 to January 14, 2010. Several contests were run, including the "Unleash Your Yellow" contest in which entrants designed a poster for the show and "Best. Couch Gag. Ever." where fans created their own live-action couch gag video.

As part of the celebration, the Irish-themed episode "In the Name of the Grandfather" premiered on Sky1 in the United Kingdom and Ireland on March 17, 2009. It was the first-ever episode of the show to air in Europe before being seen in the United States. The American debut of the episode was on March 22.

== Reception ==
=== Critical response ===
Robert Canning of IGN gave the season a 7.9 out of 10 improving 1.3 from the past season. He gave it a positive review saying that it was "Good" and that "With at least two more years of The Simpsons guaranteed, this unexpected but very welcome resurgence has come at a perfect time. If they can keep the momentum moving, the series is primed to once again approach perfection and go out at the top of its game."

=== Awards ===
Episodes from the twentieth season received five Primetime Emmy Award nominations. "Gone Maggie Gone" was nominated for Outstanding Animated Program (For Programming less than One Hour) and Outstanding Music Composition for a Series. Dan Castellaneta won the Outstanding Voice-Over Performance Emmy for voicing Homer in the episode "Father Knows Worst"; Hank Azaria and Harry Shearer were also nominated for the episodes "Eeny Teeny Maya Moe" and "The Burns and the Bees", respectively. The winners were announced on September 12, 2009. The Simpsons was the only series to be nominated in the Animation category at the Writers Guild of America Awards in 2010. The nominees were: Stephanie Gillis for "The Burns and the Bees", John Frink for "Eeny Teeny Maya, Moe", Billy Kimball & Ian Maxtone-Graham for Gone Maggie Gone", Don Payne for "Take My Life, Please", and Joel H. Cohen for "Wedding for Disaster". The award was won by Joel H. Cohen.

=== Nielsen ratings ===
The season ranked 77th in ratings with an average of 6.93 million viewers and an 18/49 rating of 3.4/9 and the rerun timeslot ranking 113th. The most viewed episode was "Treehouse of Horror XIX", with 12.48 million watching it and a 4.9 Nielsen rating. The least viewed episode was "Four Great Women and a Manicure" which is the second-least-viewed episode of the series, after Season 21's "Million Dollar Maybe".

== Blu-ray and DVD release ==
The DVD and Blu-ray boxset for season twenty was released by 20th Century Fox Home Entertainment in the United States and Canada on January 12, 2010, eight months after it had completed broadcast on television. As well as every episode from the season, the Blu-ray and DVD releases feature hand-drawn menus by Matt Groening.

The Complete Twentieth Season
Set Details			Special Features
21 episodes; 4-disc set (DVD); 2-disc set (Blu-ray); 4:3 1.33:1 Full Screen (episodes 1–9) 16:9 1.78:1 Widescreen (episodes 10–21); AUDIO (DVD); English 5.1 Dolby Digital; Spanish 2.0 Dolby Surround; French 2.0 Dolby Surround; Portuguese 2.0 Dolby Surround; AUDIO (Blu-Ray); English 5.1 DTS HD Master Audio; Spanish 5.1 Dolby Digital; French 5.1 Dolby Digital; Portuguese 5.1 Dolby Digital; SUBTITLES; English SDH; Spanish; Portuguese			Hand-drawn menus by Matt Groening; Preview of The 20th Anniversary Special
Release Dates			Hand-drawn menus by Matt Groening; Preview of The 20th Anniversary Special
Region 1	Region 2	Region 4	Hand-drawn menus by Matt Groening; Preview of The 20th Anniversary Special
January 12, 2010	September 17, 2010	January 20, 2010	Hand-drawn menus by Matt Groening; Preview of The 20th Anniversary Special
