= Take My Life, Please =

- The Simpsons episode
- Episode no.: Season 20; Episode 10
- Directed by: Steven Dean Moore
- Written by: Don Payne
- Production code: LABF01
- Original air date: February 15, 2009

Episode features
- Chalkboard gag: "HDTV is worth every cent"
- Couch gag: The Simpsons travel around the world and into outer space to find their couch. The new plasma television that displays the credits promptly falls off the wall.
- Commentary: Matt Groening; Al Jean; Steven Dean Moore; Nancy Cartwright

Episode chronology
← Previous "Lisa the Drama Queen"	Next → "How the Test Was Won"
- The Simpsons season 20

"Take My Life, Please" is the tenth episode of the twentieth season of the American animated television series The Simpsons. It originally aired on the Fox network in the United States on February 15, 2009. In the episode, Homer finds out that the class presidential election he lost in high school was rigged, and he gets the opportunity to find out what his life would have been like if he had become class president.

The episode was written by Don Payne and directed by Steven Dean Moore. It was the first episode of The Simpsons to air in 16:9 720p high-definition television. It was also the first episode to use the show's third opening sequence.

Since airing, the episode has received mixed reviews from television critics.

6.82 million people watched the episode, and coupled with an episode of King of the Hill, it won its hour in the 18–49 demographic.

== Plot ==
A man named Vance Connor is inducted into the Springfield Wall of Fame, and Homer recounts how he ran against Vance for class president in high school and lost. Later, at Moe's Tavern, Lenny and Carl confess to Homer that his old high school principal Harlan Dondelinger had ordered them to bury the ballot box containing the votes to the election. After they dig up the ballot box, Lisa counts the votes, and Homer is shocked to see that the votes put him as the winner. Outraged, he confronts a retired Dondelinger, who explains that two students had talked their classmates into voting for Homer so that they could humiliate him if he had won, so Dondelinger hid the ballot box to try to spare Homer from the embarrassment.

During a family dinner at Luigi's Restaurant, Luigi Risotto introduces Homer to his saucier, who he claims can tell what someone's life could have been like by stirring tomato sauce in a certain way. By using his magical tomato sauce, he helps Homer see what his life would have been like if he had won the election: Homer would have been rich, he would have had a better position at the nuclear plant, would have lived in a mansion on the site where the Flanders now live, would have been closer to Grampa who would live in the house in which the Simpsons currently live, and Homer would not be bald. The kids would not have been born because Homer would have remembered to use protection before sex; Marge is confused by this and tries to convince Homer that their lives would be miserable without Bart, Lisa and Maggie. He remains unconvinced and becomes more depressed after seeing that his life would have been a lot better if he had won, even leaping into the pot to try to "live in the sauce", much to the saucier's consternation.

Homer remains at home for the next couple of days. Marge convinces a reluctant Homer to take a walk with her to the Springfield Wall of Fame, where he sees a plaque dedicated to himself (it is later revealed that Homer's plaque has replaced the plaque of Principal Skinner, which can be seen discarded in a trash can). A boy then has his picture taken with him. Homer, now much happier, goes to a Korean restaurant that Bart says "sells beef that spells the date of your death".

== Production ==
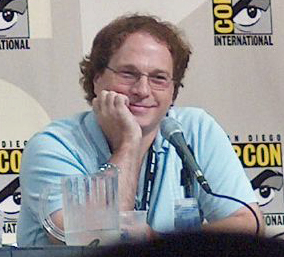
Don Payne wrote the episode.

"Take My Life, Please" was written by Don Payne and directed by Steven Dean Moore. It was the first episode of The Simpsons to air in 720p high-definition television, though not the first time The Simpsons appeared in high-definition, as The Simpsons Movie was the first Simpsons production to be rendered in HD. With the new broadcasting system came a new opening sequence. It was the first major permanent change to the show's introduction since the opening added in season 2; previous changes have included variations in the duration of the intro, and special one-shot introductions for the Treehouse of Horror Halloween episodes, as well as a handful of others. This new intro also includes some 3D animation when the camera pans over Springfield. The Simpsons creator Matt Groening told the New York Post: "The clouds at the very beginning of the main title were always unsatisfying to me. My original direction to the animators was to make the clouds as realistic as possible, and as we go through the clouds we enter this cartoon universe of The Simpsons. Finally, after a couple of decades, they've gotten closer to what I had in my mind. Not perfect, but better."

== Cultural references ==
When Marge takes Homer to the wall of fame for the second time, Homer says, "Is that why you brought me here, spirits?", a reference to Charles Dickens' novel A Christmas Carol. In the class presidential election at least one vote is shown to have been cast for Fonzie, a character from the sitcom Happy Days, while Homer fails to understand that Bruce Wayne is the true identity of the superhero Batman. Additionally, Homer's election poster claims he is endorsed by the films Star Wars and Jaws and sees him hugging Darth Vader and the shark, respectively, from each. During the episode's couch gag, the Simpsons chase the couch through the streets of San Francisco, mirroring the car chase scene in the 1968 film Bullitt.

The songs "Rock the Boat" by The Hues Corporation and "Jive Talkin'" by the Bee Gees are played in the episode, while he selects "Colour My World" by Chicago as the class song.

== Reception ==
6.82 million people watched the episode. Coupled with that night's episode of King of the Hill, it won its hour in the 18–49 demographic.

Since airing, the episode has received mixed reviews from television critics.

Rene Rosa of UGO wrote: "When the self-referential jokes about the episode's switch to HD were the things that made me laugh the most, and they last only a few seconds, I realized something was not good. This may be 'The Sharpest. Episode. Ever.' but is definitely not the funniest. Still, there are some genuinely endearing bitter-sweet moments in the episode, [...] but still it's not enough to drive the show into the un-chartable funny waters that it used to live in."

Steve Heisler of The A.V. Club wrote: "If it seems like there's a lot going on, that's because there is. The episode could have easily been just one thing—Homer deals with his Vance inferiority complex, or he sets out to discover the truth of the election from the former principal, or it could have been entirely a flashback episode. But instead, The Simpsons tries to do all three, one for each commercial break. The show has been around for 20 years; I would imagine that there would be plenty to mine from digging deep into a simpler story line for 19 minutes. Instead, 'Take My Life, Please' crushes under the weight of its bloated plot—not to mention that the overexplanation of jokes wasn't helping matters."

IGN's Robert Canning thought it was a fun episode, and said that it "helped that the major flashbacks involved took place in a fantasy world as to not effect the whole of the show. But even in those flashbacks, the jokes stayed true to what we know of the series. Add to that the great new look of the series and you get a memorable episode from season twenty of The Simpsons."

Erich Asperschlager of TV Verdict said he had always liked flashback and alternate future episodes, and he thought "Take My Life, Please" put them together in a "clever way". He added: "Maybe it's all the shiny newness, but I thought this was one of the best episodes this season. It took full advantage of the new widescreen format to cram in a ton of background detail and blink-and-you'll-miss-'em jokes. The finale dragged a bit, and they could have spent more time with the surreality of Homer's almost-the-same alternate past, but those are minor quibbles."

Don Payne was nominated for a Writers Guild of America Award in the Animation category in 2010 for writing the episode (alongside other Simpsons episodes "The Burns and the Bees", "Eeny Teeny Maya Moe", "Gone Maggie Gone" and "Wedding for Disaster") but lost to "Wedding for Disaster".
