= It's the Great Pumpkin =

It's the Great Pumpkin may refer to:

- It's the Great Pumpkin, Charlie Brown (1966 telefilm), a 1966 animated television special
- It's the Grand Pumpkin, Milhouse (2008 TV sketch), an animated segment in the 2008 Halloween episode "Treehouse of Horror XIX" of The Simpsons
- It's the Great Pumpkin, Sam Winchester (2008 TV episode), a Halloween special from season 4 of Supernatural
