= Four Great Women and a Manicure =

- The Simpsons episode
- Episode no.: Season 20; Episode 20
- Directed by: Raymond S. Persi
- Written by: Valentina L. Garza
- Production code: LABF09
- Original air date: May 10, 2009

Guest appearance
- Jodie Foster as Maggie Simpson

Episode features
- Couch gag: A French artist chisels the Simpsons out of a stone block, then turns the sculpture into a general statue.
- Commentary: Matt Groening; Al Jean; Matt Selman; Yeardley Smith; Valentina L. Garza; Raymond S. Persi; Mike B. Anderson; David Silverman

Episode chronology
← Previous "Waverly Hills, 9-0-2-1-D'oh"	Next → "Coming to Homerica"
- The Simpsons season 20

"Four Great Women and a Manicure" is the twentieth and penultimate episode of the twentieth season of the American animated television series The Simpsons. First broadcast on the Fox network in the United States on May 10, 2009, it is the second Simpsons episode (after "Simpsons Bible Stories") to have four acts instead of the usual three. The episode tells four tales of famous women featuring Simpsons characters in various roles: Selma as Queen Elizabeth I, Lisa as Snow White, Marge as Lady Macbeth and Maggie as Howard Roark from Ayn Rand's The Fountainhead.

The episode was written by Valentina L. Garza and directed by Matthew Faughnan, while Jodie Foster performs the voice of Maggie Simpson. The title is a reference to the 1994 film Four Weddings and a Funeral. It is the only episode in the history of the show in which Bart Simpson is not seen nor mentioned (not counting the opening credits). It is also the second episode (after "Mona Leaves-a") to first air on Mother's Day and deal with women or mothers.

== Plot ==
Marge takes Lisa to a salon for her first manicure, prompting a debate as to whether a woman can simultaneously be smart, powerful and beautiful.

=== Queen Elizabeth I ===
In the first tale, Marge tells the story of Queen Elizabeth I, with Selma Bouvier playing the Queen.

Various royal suitors wish to win the hand of Queen Elizabeth, including a flamboyant King Julio of Spain. The Queen rejects his advances and Julio vows revenge on England, summoning the Spanish Armada. Meanwhile, Walter Raleigh, played by Homer, falls for Elizabeth's Lady in Waiting, played by Marge. When Elizabeth catches the two making out, she sentences them to execution. They are saved at the last minute when Moe reports the arrival of the Spanish Armada. Homer leads an English naval offense against the Armada, defeating them by accidentally setting the lone English warship on fire, which then spreads to the entire Spanish fleet. Elizabeth knights him and then proclaims that she does not need a man, as she has England.

=== Snow White ===
In the second tale, Lisa tells the story of Snow White, with herself in the title role. As the Blue-Haired Lawyer reminds Lisa that Snow White and the Seven Dwarfs has been copyrighted by Disney, she changes the characters to avoid being sued.

Lisa's version features the dwarves Crabby (Moe), Drunky (Barney), Hungry (Homer), Greedy (Mr. Burns), Lenny (Lenny), Kearney (Kearney) and Doc (Julius Hibbert). When the wicked queen learns from her magic high-definition television that Snow White is fairer than she is, she dispatches her huntsman (Groundskeeper Willie) to murder the young maiden. However, Willie the huntsman cannot bring himself to cut out her heart, so Snow White flees into the forest, seeking shelter in the dwarves' cottage. She keeps house for them while they work in the mines but the wicked queen, disguised as an old woman, physically forces Snow White to eat a poisoned apple. She escapes the dwarves, only to be brutally lynched by an angry group of woodland animals. In Lisa's version, Snow White does not need a man to wake her but is brought back to life by a female doctor.

=== Lady Macbeth ===
In the third tale, Marge relates a story of ruthless ambition, embodied by Lady Macbeth.

Marge (parodying Lady Macbeth) is frustrated at having to clean the costumes worn by the other actors of a Springfield production of Macbeth, and is criticized for the poor job by the director. She hates that Homer does not have the title role of Macbeth and instead plays a tree, which pleases him as he is uninterested in auditioning for lead roles. She convinces him to murder the lead actor, Sideshow Mel. Homer follows her command and then assumes the lead role. However, his performance receives unfavorable reviews compared with the more seasoned actors and even those with no lines. He is seen showing remorse over killing Mel and Hibbert to the point of being more reluctant to kill at Marge's command. Still furious over the lack of good reviews on his part, Marge orders him to continue his killing spree until he is the only actor left.

While scrubbing the blood from the costumes, Marge is visited by the angry spirits of the murdered actors. She tries to blame her husband, but the ghosts accuse her ambition of leading Homer to their murders. In revenge for Marge's actions, the angry spirits kill her by causing a fright-induced heart attack. Homer mourns Marge, but she returns as a ghost too and commands him to perform (to a final performance to which no audience has come). Homer finally acts well, delivering a stirring soliloquy in the empty theater. An overjoyed Marge's ghost appears in the audience and enthusiastically urges him to appear in many more Shakespeare plays. Unwilling to learn all of those lines, Homer shoots himself and joins a frustrated Marge as a ghost.

=== Maggie Roark ===
In the final tale, Maggie is depicted as "Maggie Roark", representing Howard Roark from Ayn Rand's The Fountainhead.

Maggie's architectural brilliance is squashed by an oppressive pre-school teacher (Ellsworth Toohey) who encourages only conformity. She builds several famous landmarks (such as The Taj Mahal in India and The Bird's Nest in Beijing, China) out of blocks and other toys, all of which are destroyed by Toohey (to the strains of Beethoven's 9th symphony, 2nd movement), who disapproves of the superiority of her creations over those of the other children. During a Parents' Day at Mediocri-Tots Day Care Center, Maggie dazzles everyone with her rendition of the Empire State Building and ends up on trial for expressing herself. During the trial, Maggie (voiced by Jodie Foster) defends herself by stating that the creative people of her time have never compromised their talent for the sake of others and neither will she. Years later, Maggie is shown as a successful architect who opens a daycare center dedicated to letting babies express themselves freely.

=== Ending ===
The ending of the final story is interrupted when Marge stops Maggie from painting Vincent van Gogh's The Starry Night on the nail salon wall, scolding her and not realizing the irony.

== Reception ==
This episode was watched by 5.16 million viewers. It was the second most watched show of the night on Animation Domination, on the Fox network, after Family Guy.

Steve Heisler of The A.V. Club graded the episode a "C−", stating "[...] tonight's classically themed outing didn't fare very well, starting with the story of one of the Bouvier sisters as Queen Elizabeth—an episode segment that clocked in at just over four minutes, far too short a time to do anything lasting... or funny. The longest stretch came near the end, in the form of an extended riff on Macbeth involving Homer killing a ton of people. But aside from the occasional random line or two, it was pretty much a boring retelling of the tale, with Simpsons characters subbing in for Shakespearean ones. So I guess the question is: How much pleasure is there to milk from seeing familiar yellow people reenact parts of Ayn Rand's The Fountainhead? Given the show's shaky streak lately, not nearly enough."

Screen Rant listed the episode as the seventeenth worst, remarking that "...it isn't really special or memorable as it doesn't do much other than rehash stories in real-life history like Selma as Queen Elizabeth I and Lisa as Snow White."

Robert Canning of IGN gave the episode a 6.2/10, ultimately saying "Four stories instead of three, but there was really one worth watching", "Snow White".

== See also ==
- MacHomer, a play by Rick Miller blending Macbeth and The Simpsons
