= No Loan Again, Naturally =

- The Simpsons episode
- Episode no.: Season 20; Episode 12
- Directed by: Mark Kirkland
- Written by: Jeff Westbrook
- Production code: LABF03
- Original air date: March 8, 2009

Guest appearance
- Maurice LaMarche as Additional Voices

Episode features
- Chalkboard gag: "I will not have fun with educational toys"
- Couch gag: The Simpsons bury their couch after they find it beaten up and torn, then go to a ranch to get a new one. After the new couch bucks Homer off its back, Homer is seen in a full-body cast.
- Commentary: Matt Groening

Episode chronology
← Previous "How the Test Was Won"	Next → "Gone Maggie Gone"
- The Simpsons season 20

"No Loan Again, Naturally" is the twelfth episode of the twentieth season of the American animated television series The Simpsons. It originally aired on Fox in the United States on March 8, 2009. "No Loan Again, Naturally" was written by Jeff Westbrook and directed by Mark Kirkland.

Maurice LaMarche guest starred in the episode. It was seen by 5.99 million viewers.

Since airing, the episode has received generally positive reviews from television critics. The name of the episode references a 1970s song "Alone Again (Naturally)"; the song had previously been referenced in the title of the fourteenth episode of The Simpsons' eleventh season, "Alone Again, Natura-Diddily", which also centered largely around interactions between Homer and Ned.

== Plot ==
The Simpsons throw a Mardi Gras party, having invited most of the town, and Homer reluctantly invites Ned Flanders at Marge's insistence. As they clean up the house the following morning, Lenny asks how they pay for the huge yearly party. Homer gleefully confesses that he borrows from a home equity line to do so, calling his home a "sucker" for getting stuck with the bill. Marge and Homer visit their mortgage broker, Gil Gunderson, after receiving a letter and find out that their adjustable rate mortgage payment has increased drastically because of Homer's ineptitude. The Simpson home gets foreclosed and goes up for public auction and after seeing the Simpsons' sorrow, Ned outbids the initial offer for the house by Mr. Burns of $100,000, purchasing the home for $101,000 and then offers to let the Simpsons move back in and rent the property from him. The Simpsons thank Ned with a song and a small celebration, when Marge notices the sink faucet dripping. Ned offers to fix it, as he is now their landlord and the repairs are his responsibility, along with some other items that he is obligated to correct. However, Ned quickly tires of their constant requests for repairs.

Despite Ned's best efforts, Homer gets mad at him and denounces him to the media as a corrupt slumlord after Ned refuses to fix a gas leak. When Homer refuses to apologize for his ingratitude, Ned tells them they must leave at the end of the month. The Simpsons move Grampa into the house with them in order to take advantage of a loophole in the eviction laws, but Grampa decides to live in Ned's house instead due to the better living conditions, automatically evicting the Simpsons, who are forced to sleep at a homeless shelter. While interviewing some potential tenants, Ned sees a picture from the move-in celebration and remembers the Simpsons' happiness and admiration of him. Ned lets the Simpsons move back into their house, ignoring the new tenants' threat of legal action. The rest of the Simpsons' neighbors promptly move away, disgusted at this decision.

== Production ==
The episode was written by Jeff Westbrook and directed by Mark Kirkland. Maurice LaMarche also guest starred in the episode as various characters.

== Cultural references ==
The title of the episode references Gilbert O'Sullivan song "Alone Again (Naturally)".

== Reception ==
In its original American broadcast, "No Loan Again, Naturally" was viewed by an estimated 5.99 million households. The episode also received 3.4 rating/6% share in the 18-49 demographic.

The episode received generally positive reviews from television critics.

Robert Canning of IGN said it can sometimes be difficult for an animated television show to "stay current, what with their lengthy production schedules that start months before the episode actually airs", but with "No Loan Again, Naturally" he felt like "if they wrote and animated everything just a few weeks ago. Well, the initial concept, anyway. With the Simpson family losing their house, it was up to Ned to come in and save the day. But what he couldn't do was keep this episode from feeling very middle-of-the-road."

Erich Asperschlager of TV Verdict thought the episode delivered on "its deceptively simple premise in spades. Any time you get this much Ned Flanders, good things are bound to happen. Mix in a good deed well-punished and you’ve got a real winner."

Steve Heisler of The A.V. Club gave the episode a B+ writing, "This episode's story was actually fairly original, which surprisingly doesn't happen all that often. Yeah, the story was mighty predictable, but what I liked about tonight's Simpsons was that it ventured into character-based territory, rather than an oddball, plot-driven direction."
