= Dangerous Curves (The Simpsons) =

- The Simpsons episode
- A young Homer and Marge
- Episode no.: Season 20; Episode 5
- Directed by: Matthew Faughnan
- Written by: Billy Kimball; Ian Maxtone-Graham
- Production code: KABF18
- Original air date: November 9, 2008

Guest appearances
- Maurice LaMarche as Cap'n Crunch, Trix Rabbit and Toucan Sam

Episode features
- Chalkboard gag: "I did not see teacher siphoning gas"
- Couch gag: The family is a group of wooden figures that come out of a set of cuckoo clocks.

Episode chronology
← Previous "Treehouse of Horror XIX"	Next → "Homer and Lisa Exchange Cross Words"
- The Simpsons season 20

"Dangerous Curves" is the fifth episode of the twentieth season of the American animated television series The Simpsons. It first aired on the Fox network in the United States on November 9, 2008 and in the United Kingdom on December 7, 2008. The episode was written by Billy Kimball and Ian Maxtone-Graham and was directed by Matthew Faughnan.

In this episode, a family trip to a cabin prompts flashbacks of an early moment in Homer and Marge's relationship and a revelation that they nearly strayed from their marriage five years ago. The episode received mixed reviews from television critics.

== Plot ==
On the Fourth of July, the Simpson family visit a cabin in the woods. While driving there, they pick up hitchhikers Squeaky Voiced Teen and his girlfriend, Beatrice. Homer flashes back twenty years earlier to 1988, when he and Marge ride their bikes down a highway. While trying to kiss, Homer crashes his bike, forcing them to walk. Ned and Maude Flanders are driving by, see them and pick them up. Ned and Maude are on their honeymoon after their wedding earlier that day, but Ned warns the other two about potential marital problems in the future.

Back in the present, Homer becomes annoyed with the Squeaky Voiced Teen kissing Beatrice, prompting another flashback to five years earlier in 2003, where a married Homer and Marge are more stressed. Driving with Marge, Patty and Selma, and getting the usual flak from the latter two, Homer angrily kicks them out of the car, unaware they had the map to their cabin destination. The car runs out of gas and Homer and Marge walk off with a gas can, stopping at a home to use the phone. The owner, Alberto, is having a party, and he invites them in. Marge becomes enraged after seeing Homer flirting with a beautiful woman named Sylvia. Following an argument, Marge accidentally falls into the pool. Homer starts a sushi fight, and Marge regrets marrying Homer.

In the present, the family drops off the Squeaky-Voiced Teen and Beatrice, and continue to their cabin. In 1988, Ned barricades unmarried Homer and Marge chastely in separate rooms of the cabin to discourage premarital sex. In 2003, Alberto comforts Marge, who leaves the party with him for a private airplane ride, while Homer, seeing them in the sky, drives off with Sylvia. They each decide to spend the night together but end up at the cabin, where Homer sees Marge through the window but does not see Alberto. Upon hearing Homer calling out for Marge, Alberto panics and hides in a trunk just before Homer arrives. Despite his initial misgivings, Homer concludes that he and Marge were both there to recapture the memories of their dating years. On Marge's insistence, Homer pulls the trunk out of the room, where he promptly pushes Sylvia into out of Marge's eyesight. Alberto and Sylvia fall in love in the trunk while Homer and Marge rekindle their love.

In the present, Homer and Marge meet Alberto and Sylvia, now married with a daughter named Ruthie, and learn of each other's near-affairs. Marge is disgusted, but Homer points out she was just as bad as he was. Homer regrets marrying Marge and, trapped in a ball of their luggage which happened while unpacking, has Ruthie roll him into the woods.

Back in 1988, Ned comforts Homer, who is despondent at Marge's absence the previous night, and encourages him to consider marrying Marge in the future. Taking a walk through the woods with Marge, Homer carves the message "Marge + Homer 4ever" into a tree. In the present, Homer sees this message, and tries to cut it out of the tree to show to Marge as a symbol of their everlasting love. Marge arrives to reassure him but accidentally knocks the tree over a ravine. Homer clings onto the bark and falls down the ravine toward the river below with Marge falling after. They are saved by Bart and Lisa in their pedal car, which Bart had accidentally driven into the river.

== Cultural references ==
The episode's non-linear plot showing various points in Homer and Marge's relationship is a reference to the 1967 film Two for the Road, starring Audrey Hepburn and Albert Finney, and the episode's musical score mimics the film's Henry Mancini score. Homer, Sylvia and Dr. Hibbert sing the Chubby Checker song "Limbo Rock", while a water-soaked Marge resembles Cousin Itt from The Addams Family.

Toucan Sam, Trix, Cap'n Crunch and Count Chocula are all featured on Bart's Cereal Killer game; they are, respectively, the mascots for Froot Loops, Trix, Cap'n Crunch and Count Chocula breakfast cereals. The handheld system Bart is playing on is a Game Boy Advance. The quote "I'm Cuckoo for Killing Stuff", used afterward by Bart, was also a reference to the I'm Cuckoo for Cocoa Puffs slogan for Cocoa Puffs.

== Reception ==
Since airing, the episode has received mixed reviews from television critics.

Robert Canning of IGN said, "I did find Bart and Lisa as the bickering couple...to be very funny. It added a fresh twist to this generally stale outing. ...There were other fun laughs...but none of that could make up for the poor story being told or the overall unfunniness of the episode." He gave this episode a 5.8.

Erich Asperschlager of TV Verdict wrote: "I’ve always enjoyed The Simpsons flashback episodes. The best of them tickle a nostalgic funny bone, but 'Dangerous Curves' doesn’t really fit with those episodes, though. The story of Homer and Marge’s marriage weathering a serious storm would be a lot more compelling if we hadn’t seen it before. I’m glad the writers feel they can write character-based stories after 19 years. I just wish they’d stop repeating themselves. Still, 'Dangerous Curves' is at least a complete story from beginning to end, and it has some of the best one-liners this season."

Daniel Aughey of TV Guide said, "[It was the] Worst. Episode. Ever. I found the events of this week's episode so simplistic that I was utterly confused." He went on to say, "The story was stitched together and never really had any momentum."
