= Homer and Lisa Exchange Cross Words =

- The Simpsons episode
- Promotional image featuring Merl Reagle, Homer, Lisa, and Will Shortz.
- Episode no.: Season 20; Episode 6
- Directed by: Nancy Kruse
- Written by: Tim Long
- Production code: KABF19
- Original air date: November 16, 2008

Guest appearances
- Marcia Wallace as Edna Krabappel; Merl Reagle as himself; Will Shortz as himself; Scott Thompson as Grady

Episode features
- Couch gag: In a reference to the Vesuvius eruption, the family sits on a bench dressed in togas, and are covered in volcanic ash.

Episode chronology
← Previous "Dangerous Curves"	Next → "MyPods and Boomsticks"
- The Simpsons season 20

"Homer and Lisa Exchange Cross Words" is the sixth episode of the twentieth season of the American animated television series The Simpsons. It originally aired on the Fox network in the United States on November 16, 2008. In the episode, Lisa discovers that she has a talent for solving crossword puzzles, and she enters a crossword tournament. Lisa's feelings are hurt when she discovers that Homer bet against her in the championship match.

The episode was inspired by Patrick Creadon's 2006 documentary Wordplay, and was written by Tim Long, and directed by Nancy Kruse. Crossword puzzle creators Merl Reagle and Will Shortz guest star as themselves in the episode while Scott Thompson has a cameo as Grady, a character he first voiced in "Three Gays of the Condo". Reagle created all of the crossword puzzles that appear in the episode and as a promotion for the episode, a special Simpsons-related message (dedicated to this episode) that appeared in The New York Times Sunday crossword on November 16, 2008.

The episode received generally positive reviews from critics, and finished fourth in its timeslot during its initial airing on Fox, with a 3.9 Nielsen rating.

== Plot ==
Bart and Lisa start a lemonade stand, but it is quickly closed due to their not having a vending permit. They get in line at the licensing bureau, only to find that the long line is standing still due to the clerk doing a crossword puzzle. Impatient, Lisa completes the puzzle herself, only to find herself addicted to the puzzles. The scene is a shot-for-shot adaptation of the Al Sanders scene in Wordplay. Eventually, she becomes so obsessed with them that Superintendent Chalmers hands her a pamphlet for the Crossword City Tournament. Meanwhile, at Moe's, Edna Krabappel offers to buy a beer for anyone who breaks up with Principal Skinner for her. Homer ends their relationship and decides to take a second job in which he helps break up romantic relationships. Grady, one of his old roommates, calls Homer and asks him to break up Grady's and his boyfriend's relationship because he has found a new and "better" man in Duffman. Homer successfully manages to break up the couple. After making a good deal of money, he dreams that he is pestered by the "ghosts" of the jilted lovers and thus quits the trade.

At the crossword tournament, Homer bets his money from his breakup business on Lisa and wins big. However, upon hearing Lisa saying that she is wary of the final round, he bets on the other finalist, Gil Gunderson. Gil plays Lisa for her sympathy and cons her into losing the round, which in turn lets Homer win his final bet. Upon realizing that Homer has come into some money by betting against her in the tournament, Lisa gets angry at him and refuses to acknowledge herself as Homer's daughter, even going so far as to take Marge's maiden name and start calling herself "Lisa Bouvier". Feeling guilty, Homer commissions Merl Reagle and Will Shortz to create a special puzzle for the New York Times, with his apology to Lisa hidden in the clues and solution. The two of them make up.

== Production ==
The episode was written by Tim Long, and directed by Nancy Kruse. James L. Brooks got the inspiration for the episode from the 2006 documentary Wordplay which chronicles the national crossword puzzle championships, and he thought that Lisa should go to a championship in the episode. Will Shortz and Merl Reagle, who both starred in the documentary, appear in the episode. "We felt both Will and Merl were very compelling, off-the-beaten-track personalities [in Wordplay], who would fit into our universe very well", Brooks said.

Shortz was the first guest star the producers of The Simpsons approached. Long later asked Reagle to make puzzles for the episode. Reagle recorded his lines in a studio near his home. Reagle told the Arizona Daily Wildcat that "for me, to be such a total nut for animation since I was a kid, I never even dreamed [of being in a cartoon]. It's like a dream I never had coming true." He added that "you don't see [the crosswords] in the episode for very long, but when crossword fans watch this show, we want them to think that we got it right." Reagle designed every puzzle that appears in the episode, including one that appears in a hopscotch court in Lisa's daydream. There were certain lines in the script that had to be incorporated into Reagle's puzzles, including one where Gil says, "I think I'll throw some Q's around", and he enters a number of Q's onto the grid. Reagle, therefore, had to create a puzzle which used words that included the letter Q more frequently than would be usual. Reagle said he saw the early script of the episode, "but they change it right up to the last minute. In a lot of ways, I'll be seeing it for the first time right along with everyone else." Scott Thompson has a cameo in the episode as Grady, a character that he first voiced in the season 14 episode "Three Gays of the Condo".

The episode features three musical montages: the sequence of Homer helping couples to break up features "Farewell to You, Baby" by Carl Martin, Homer's gambling on Lisa's puzzle solving is set to "Word Up!" by Cameo and "Fanfare for the Common Man" plays in the background of the montage of words removed from the dictionary.

=== Promotion ===
In order to promote this episode, guest stars Reagle and Shortz collaborated with the episodes' writer Tim Long to create a hidden Simpsons-related message (dedicated to this episode) that appeared in The New York Times Sunday crossword on November 16, 2008. The crossword, which was titled "Sounds Like Somebody I Know", also appears as a plot point in the episode. Harry Shearer recorded a clip of Mr. Burns and Smithers telling the winner of the National Public Radio's Sundays Puzzle on November 16, 2008, what they had won.

== Reception ==
On the night it aired, the episode was watched by 8.5 million viewers and had a 3.9 Nielsen rating, finishing fourth in its timeslot. The episode did finish first in the 18–34 demographic with a 4.7 Nielsen rating and a 13 share of the audience, narrowly beating an episode of 60 Minutes featuring Barack Obama in the demographic.

Tim Long was nominated for Writers Guild of America Award in the animation category for writing the episode.

The episode received generally positive reviews from critics.

Robert Canning of IGN did not think there was anything "terrible" about the episode, but he did not think there was anything to get excited about, either. Canning thought there were a number of throwaway jokes in the episode that he felt worked well, "but the episode as a whole failed to grab me. As stated, there are a number of episodes that already fit this mold, and most of those are far superior."

Daniel Aughey of TV Guide thought the episode provided a "healthy balance" of humor, story and heart. "Exactly what makes a great Simpsons episode!" Aughey would have liked to see Homer's storyline explored as an A story in its own episode rather than cut short as a C story.

Erich Asperschlager of TV Verdict thought the puzzle-solving storyline was "a lot of fun", both for its references to the "highly entertaining" documentary Wordplay and the jokes it inspired. He thought the one problem with the final part of the storyline was that it took away from what could have been "one of the best Lisa-centric episodes in a long time. Marrying her bookish sensibilities with cruciverbal skills is an inspired idea. They should have done more with it. At the very least, it would have left more screentime for Will Shortz and Merl Reagle."
