= MyPods and Boomsticks =

- The Simpsons episode
- Episode no.: Season 20; Episode 7
- Directed by: Steven Dean Moore
- Written by: Marc Wilmore
- Production code: KABF20
- Original air date: November 30, 2008

Guest appearance
- Shohreh Aghdashloo as Mina

Episode features
- Chalkboard gag: "Prosperity is just around the corner" (at school) "I will not bring the chalkboard home" (at home during the couch gag)
- Couch gag: The family finds Bart writing "I will not bring the chalkboard home" on a chalkboard in front of the couch.

Episode chronology
← Previous "Homer and Lisa Exchange Cross Words"	Next → "The Burns and the Bees"
- The Simpsons season 20

"MyPods and Boomsticks" is the seventh episode of the twentieth season of the American animated television series The Simpsons. It first aired on the Fox network in the United States on November 30, 2008.

In the episode, Homer becomes suspicious of Bart's new Muslim friend, Bashir, and decides to invite his family for dinner. When Homer offends them, he goes to their home to apologize but discovers what he believes to be a terrorist plot to blow up the Springfield Mall. In the episode's subplot, Lisa gets a MyPod (a parody of iPod) and racks up a large bill.

The episode was written by Marc Wilmore and directed by Steven Dean Moore with Shohreh Aghdashloo of 24 guest-starring as Bashir's mother, Mina.

It is the first episode of The Simpsons to have Islam portrayed in a large role. It was the most watched show on Fox on its original airing, and received fairly positive reviews from television critics. Its commentary on Islamophobia in the United States proved to be controversial, however.

The episode's theme was praised by the Council on American–Islamic Relations and the Muslim Public Affairs Council, and Aghdashloo was given an award by the latter organization for her role.

== Plot ==
At the Mapple Store (A parody of Apple, Inc.), Bart interrupts a video message from company founder Steve Mobbs (a parody of Steve Jobs) and insults the company's user base. Fleeing from the Mapple customers, he runs into a Muslim boy from Jordan named Bashir and befriends him. Homer is impressed by Bashir's manners, but Lenny, Carl and Moe convince him that all Muslims are terrorists. He invites Bashir's family over to dinner in an attempt to expose them, but openly offends them, causing them to leave.

Later that evening, while going to their home to apologize, Homer catches a glimpse of Bashir's father working with TNT in his garage. He goes home and has a nightmare featuring the Genie of Aladdin, who transforms the "decadent, Western society" into a stereotypical Islamic republic. Shaken by the dream, Homer eavesdrops on Bashir's father speaking about his work in building demolition, but misinterprets it and believes he is a suicide bomber. As soon as Bashir's father departs for work, Homer convinces the mother to invite him so he can apologize. He uses the family's laptop and discovers a diagram of demolition plans for the Springfield Mall.

Homer rushes to the mall to warn the shoppers (but tells Patty and Selma to stay put) and sees Bart standing near a detonator with Bashir and his father; he attempts to save the day by throwing the dynamite in the river. It actually turns out that the old mall was slated for destruction and he instead blows up a bridge that is used by the Duff Brewery. Realizing his mistake, Homer apologizes, and the Simpson family throws a "Pardon My Intolerance" party for Bashir's family.

In a subplot, Lisa obtains a MyPod from Krusty the Clown at the Mapple Store. She becomes obsessed with the device and racks up a US$1,200 bill. She goes to Mapple's undersea headquarters and begs Steve Mobbs to consider a reduced payment plan. Mobbs offers Lisa a job at Mapple to help with her bill. Much to her chagrin, the job is standing on a street corner dressed as a MyPod, handing out Mapple pamphlets and telling people to "Think Differently".

== Cultural references ==
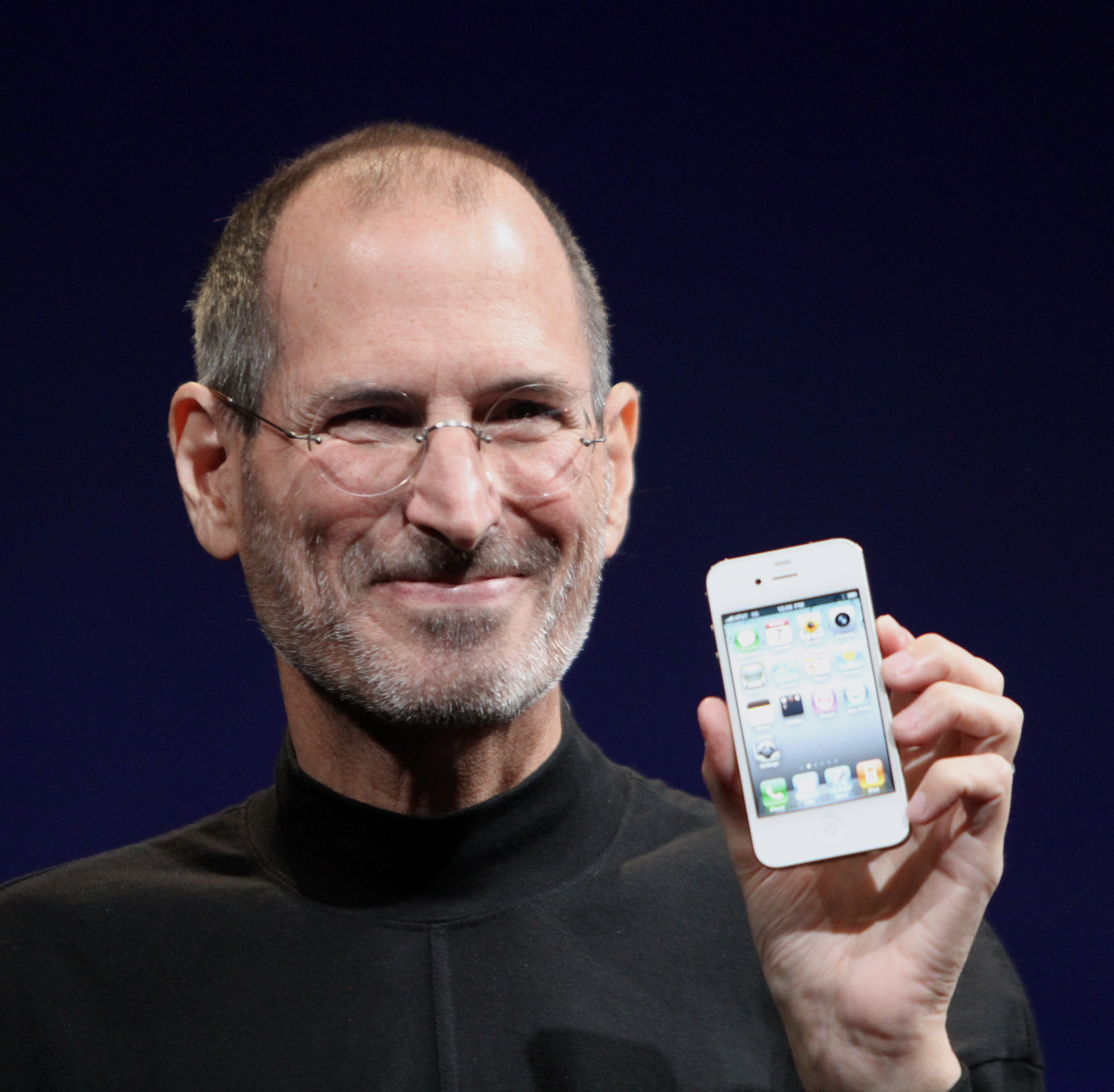
The episode features parodies of Apple Inc., its products, and its then CEO Steve Jobs

The episode features numerous parodies of Apple Inc. and its products. Apple is portrayed as Mapple, with the MyPod, MyPhone, MyTunes, MyCube, Mapple Store and Brainiac Bar referring respectively to the iPod, iPhone, iTunes, Power Mac G4 Cube, Apple Store and Genius Bar. Later episodes of the show also feature a MyPad, a reference to the iPad. The CEO of Mapple is Steve Mobbs, a parody of Apple Inc.'s then-CEO Steve Jobs. The scene where Comic Book Guy throws a sledgehammer at the computer screen is a reference to the "1984" Apple commercial.

The episode also features numerous references to films and pop culture. The scene where Homer is on a flying carpet is a parody of the film Aladdin; the Genie also makes an appearance, in which The Simpsons regular cast member Dan Castellaneta reprises his role from the Aladdin television series, The Return of Jafar, and the Kingdom Hearts video game series. Steve Mobbs operating a series of holographic screens with his hands is a reference to the 2002 film Minority Report.

The music in the episode features Minnie Riperton's song "Lovin' You" and Miles Davis' "Moon Dreams", while the episode's Itchy & Scratchy cartoon features Ludwig van Beethoven's "Symphony No. 5" and the Alicia Bridges song "I Love the Nightlife".

The title itself is a pun on the 1971 Disney musical fantasy film Bedknobs and Broomsticks, directed by Robert Stevenson.

== Reception ==
"MyPods and Boomsticks" was the most viewed show on Fox the night it was first broadcast, with roughly 7.8 million viewers and a 4.4 Nielsen rating.

=== Television critics ===
The episode was generally praised by critics.

Robert Canning of IGN praised the episode; as a whole, he called the episode funny and strong and "gave the now familiar 'suspected terrorist' plot a Simpsons twist", but called the remainder of the Mapple storyline less impressive. Canning ends his review by saying that minus Lisa's involvement after act one, it was a decently funny episode of The Simpsons. He gave the episode a rating of 7.6/10.

Critics praised the episode for its jokes, but claimed that the episode should have been released earlier in the decade, especially when the September 11 attacks and introduction of Apple products were more relevant.

Daniel Aughey of TV Guide also praised the episode for its consistent story and funny jokes. Aughey explained certain jokes in the episode that he enjoyed and explained how the "A-Z" plots play well with the jokes.

Both Heisler and Aughey commented that the episode should have been done earlier, Heisler thinking the theme was dated and Aughey calling it "one step behind", both feeling the Islamophobia theme would have been more current closer to the beginning of the 21st century.

Writing for The A.V. Club, Steve Heisler gave the episode a C−. He was perplexed why all names relating to the Apple company were slightly changed, but references to other brands such as Old Navy were not.

In addition, the episode was featured on Entertainment Weekly's Five Best TV quotes of the week with Bart's line of "Wow, all these years I've been patting lambs when I should have been shoving them in my mouth." being picked.

=== Reception of theme ===
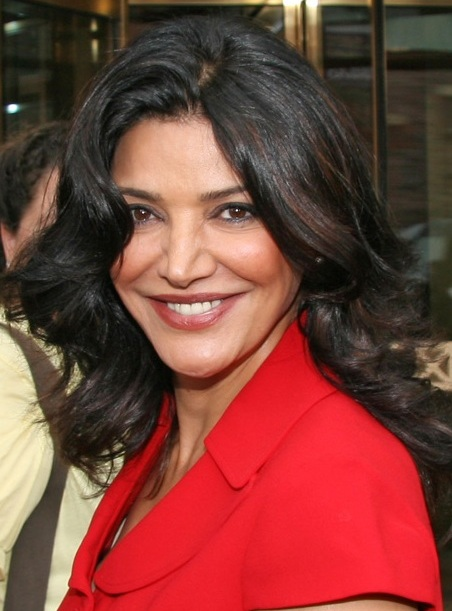
Shohreh Aghdashloo was given an award by the Muslim Public Affairs Council for her voice performance

The Simpsons is noted for its religious themes, primarily the Protestant faith of most characters, but has also featured episodes based around Judaism, Catholicism, Hinduism and Buddhism. However, this was the first to have a plot involving Islam. In 2000, Religion writer Mark I. Pinsky contacted the show's staff while writing The Gospel According to The Simpsons to inquire why there was not an episode involving Islam. He was told that this was because they did not know enough about the faith, but were intending to make an episode.

In a June 2015 article for CNN after several controversies regarding depictions of Muhammad, Pinsky noted "MyPods and Boomsticks" as a satire of Islam that is "wise, and well within the show's tradition of portraying an unfamiliar faith in a knowing way, with a relatively light hand, while at the same time defanging a widespread religious prejudice".

David Feltmate, a writer on religious topics, mentioned the episode in his book Drawn to the Gods: Religion in The Simpsons, South Park and Family Guy, alongside the South Park episode "The Snuke" and the Family Guy episode "Turban Cowboy". He wrote that all three of those animated sitcoms treat Islam in the same way as they do new religious movements, interpreting them through widely held stereotypes, in this case terrorism. However, in his opinion, "MyPods and Boomsticks" is the one example in which Islam is hated at the start of the episode but not at the end.

The Council on American–Islamic Relations praised the episode and sent a commending letter to Matt Groening. The Council's Executive Director Nihad Awad wrote that "Because of its acceptance in popular culture, comedy is often one of the best vehicles for challenging stereotypes and intolerance. Fox and Matt Groening are to be congratulated for tackling the disturbing phenomenon of Islamophobia."

In April 2009, The Muslim Public Affairs Council gave an award to Shohreh Aghdashloo, the voice performer of Mina. The organization said that "The episode sends a powerful message through humor about the danger of ignorance and prejudice rooted in false assumptions". Wilmore's writing of the episode was nominated for Outstanding Writing in a Comedy Series at the 40th NAACP Image Awards. The award went to Erica D. Montolfo for the "White Coats and White Lies" episode of The Game.
