= The Good, the Sad and the Drugly =

- The Simpsons episode
- Episode no.: Season 20; Episode 17
- Directed by: Rob Oliver
- Written by: Marc Wilmore
- Production code: LABF07
- Original air date: April 19, 2009

Guest appearance
- Anne Hathaway as Jenny

Episode features
- Chalkboard gag: "I will not mock teacher's outdated cell phone"
- Couch gag: The Simpsons slash their way through the jungle to get to their couch, only to find monkey versions of themselves already sitting on it.

Episode chronology
← Previous "Eeny Teeny Maya Moe"	Next → "Father Knows Worst"
- The Simpsons season 20

"The Good, the Sad and the Drugly" is the seventeenth episode of the twentieth season of the American animated television series The Simpsons, and the 437th episode overall. It originally aired on the Fox network in the United States on April 19, 2009. In the episode, Bart sets up Milhouse to take the fall for a prank the two of them pulled, and the duo's friendship becomes strained when Bart falls for a charitable girl named Jenny. He starts making her think he is actually good and not bad. Meanwhile, Lisa becomes depressed when she finds articles on the Internet predicting that Springfield will suffer from catastrophic events in fifty years.

The episode was written by Marc Wilmore and directed by Rob Oliver. It features actress Anne Hathaway as Jenny.

"The Good, the Sad and the Drugly" received generally mixed reviews from critics for its similarities with other episodes. According to the Nielsen ratings, the episode was watched by 6.50 million households in its original airing.

== Plot ==
Milhouse and Bart loosen every bolt and screw in Springfield Elementary, leading to mass chaos when the building and its contents fall apart. Milhouse is apprehended by Principal Skinner, and suspended from school for a week to be subsequently grounded. Bart, whose involvement with the prank was not discovered, promises to visit Milhouse every day. Homer drops Bart off at Springfield Retirement Castle to visit Grampa. There, Bart is immediately smitten with a kind and charitable girl named Jenny. Bart makes a concerted effort to appear "good" to Jenny, demonstrating his newfound good nature by defending ducklings and eventually inviting Jenny over for dinner. However, Milhouse shows up on Bart and Jenny's dates, threatening to reveal Bart's true, dark nature because Bart forgot to visit him during his suspension. Eventually, Bart confesses to Jenny that he was actually bad before he met her and only pretended to be good to start a relationship. He continues to say that he is changed completely because of being with her. Shocked by this revelation, Jenny, though momentarily pleased by Bart's honesty, cannot forgive him, and angrily dumps him, leaving him heartbroken.

Meanwhile, Lisa is assigned to write a report on what Springfield will look like in the year 2059. When she discovers online reports about war, poverty and environmental disasters, she is filled with anxiety and depression and terrifies her classmates with her dark, morbid visions of the future. Homer and Marge take her to a psychiatrist, who prescribes Lisa "happy pills". Lisa is initially skeptical, but after taking her first pill she loses touch with her problems and sees everything as smiley faces. In her love-induced stupor, she nearly kisses a running fan held by Maggie, until a horrified Marge finally intervenes by taking Lisa off the medication.

Bart drowns his sorrows on a couple of Shrek Squishees at the Kwik-E-Mart where a recovering Lisa tells him that they cannot be in despair about certain issues and should just move on. Bart decides to take Lisa's advice, and leaves after buying a bouquet of roses, and apologizes to Jenny off-screen for lying to her about his true character and Milhouse for his neglect to visit him. In the end, Bart gives the roses to Milhouse, and the two friends reconcile and play a prank together, repeatedly driving an ice resurfacer over the floor of the school to turn it into an indoor ice rink for the school kids.

== Production ==
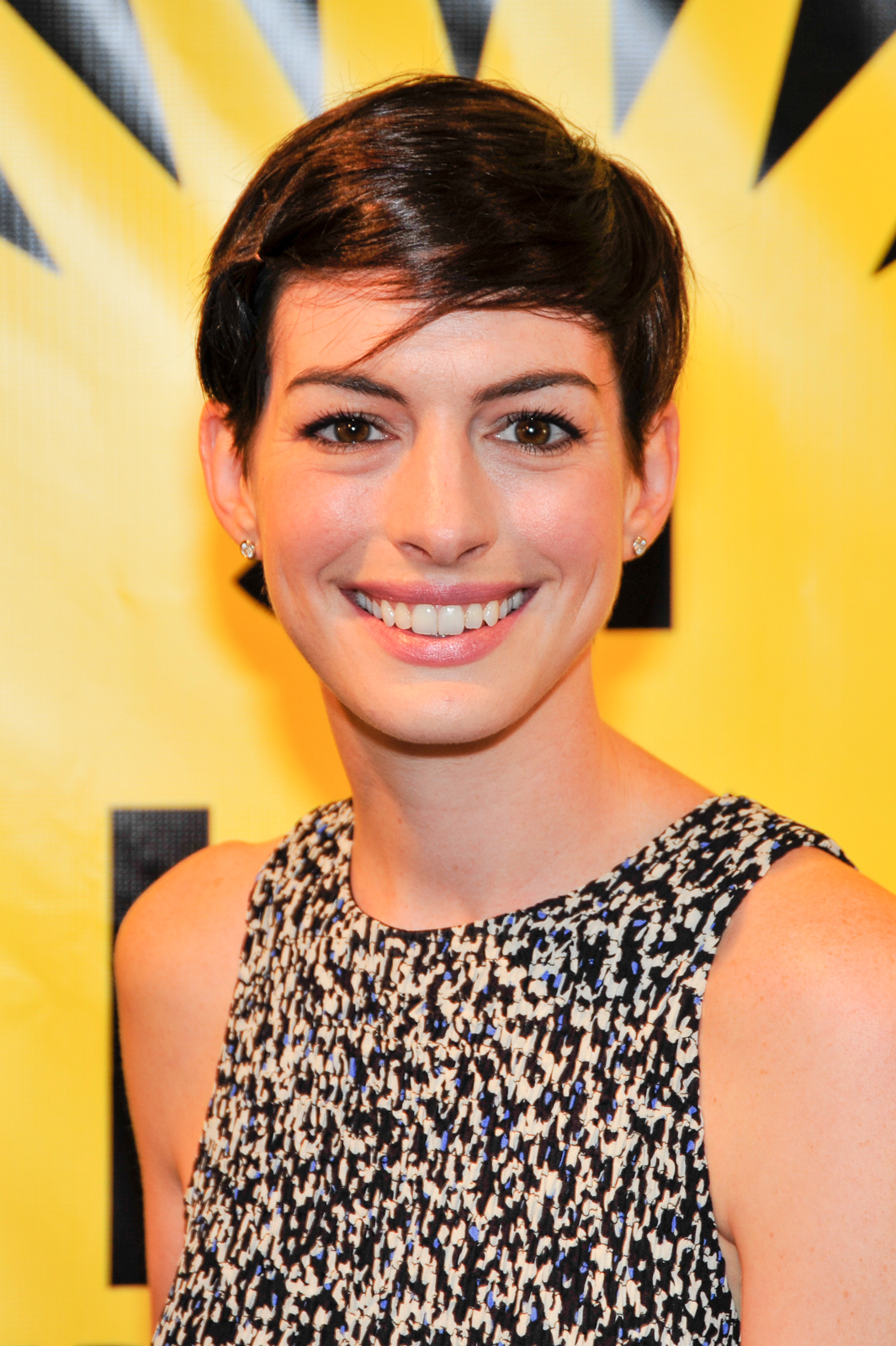
Anne Hathaway, a childhood fan of The Simpsons, guest starred as Bart's girlfriend Jenny

"The Good, the Sad and the Drugly" was written by Marc Wilmore and directed by Rob Oliver. In September 2008, it was announced that Anne Hathaway would guest star as Bart's girlfriend in a future episode. Hathaway, who has been a Simpsons fan since the shorts on The Tracey Ullman Show, said that she grew up watching The Simpsons with her brothers, and said that "it stuck with me...high school, college, post, everything. I always stop whenever it's on." She said that she "flipped out" when she was offered a guest role and that it "might be the most [...] exciting thing" that has ever happened to her. The episode marked the first time she did a voice-over to an animation that was not animated beforehand. Hathaway described her character Jenny as a "good girl" but "not necessarily bland" and "a little complicated, [and] a little judgemental".

== Reception ==
According to the Nielsen ratings, "The Good, the Sad and the Drugly" was watched by 6.50 million households in its original in the United States on April 19, 2009. It received a 3.0 rating in the 18–49 demographic, and was the second most-watched series in the Animation Domination block.

Erich Asperschlager of TV Verdict said that it "isn't a bad episode [...] It's just not very original", as he thought it "borrows heavily" from past episodes, stating: "I'll gladly defend the show against those who say it's no longer funny, but episodes like this make it hard to defend against those who say that 20 seasons on it's just more of the same."

Robert Canning of IGN gave the episode 7.5/10, and said that "a lot of the basic ideas found in ‘The Good, the Sad and the Drugly’ have been mined before in episodes of The Simpsons, but said that the episode "was using the classic episodes as an inspiration and not simply ripping them off." Canning said that Hathaway "did a fine job", but said that "there was nothing extreme in the part that she was called upon to perform, so in essence Jenny could have been performed by anybody."

Genevieve Koski of The A.V. Club face the episode a B+, stating that the episode "’Good, Sad and Drugly’ benefited from a pretty straightforward A story—no weird digressions or preludes that go nowhere—and a minimum of Homer-centric buffoonery. Keeping the action focused on Bart kept things simple and damn near heartwarming at times, particularly the nice capper where he goes to apologize to Milhouse instead of trying to win back Jenny. It was a nice reminder of the humanity that used to pulse beneath The Simpsons, before it transitioned to the more manic, sometimes cynical show we see today."
