= Waverly Hills, 9-0-2-1-D'oh =

- The Simpsons episode
- Episode no.: Season 20; Episode 19
- Directed by: Mike Frank Polcino
- Written by: J. Stewart Burns
- Production code: LABF10
- Original air date: May 3, 2009

Guest appearances
- Maurice LaMarche as the Inspector; Elliot Page as Alaska Nebraska (credited as Ellen Page); Marcia Wallace as Mrs. Krabappel

Episode features
- Couch gag: The Simpsons are seated in the audience of the Colosseum during the Roman Empire. A gladiator's head flies into the audience and Bart catches it.
- Commentary: Matt Groening: Mike Frank Polcino; Matt Selman; Hank Azaria

Episode chronology
← Previous "Father Knows Worst"	Next → "Four Great Women and a Manicure"
- The Simpsons season 20

"Waverly Hills, 9-0-2-1-D'oh", or "Waverly Hills 9-0-2-1-(Annoyed Grunt)", is the nineteenth episode of the twentieth season of the American animated television series The Simpsons. Parodying the 2007 film No Country for Old Men, the episode first aired on the Fox network in the United States on May 3, 2009. The episode was written by J. Stewart Burns and directed by Mike Frank Polcino.

In this episode, Homer and Marge transfer Bart and Lisa to a better school due to the poor rating of Springfield Elementary. Homer rents an apartment in the new school's neighbourhood to fulfil the school's local residency requirement, while Lisa has trouble making friends at the new school until Bart helps. Elliot Page guest starred as Alaska Nebraska, and Maurice LaMarche guest starred as the Inspector. The episode received mixed reviews.

== Plot ==
Marge is out jogging one morning and discovers a booth offering free samples of "Science Water". After consuming too many free samples, she desperately searches for a public toilet, finding one in Springfield Elementary School. Afterwards, she walks through the halls and is appalled to discover that Springfield Elementary is the worst school in the state, replete with apathetic teachers and overcrowded classrooms. Marge and Homer, concerned for their children's future, decide to rent an apartment in the upscale Waverly Hills school district so Lisa and Bart can attend a better school. Lisa and Bart are thrilled at the prospect of a fresh start. Bart, eager to establish his reputation as a "bad boy", is shackled and led away by Chief Wiggum, leaving the other students in awe. Once away from Waverly Hills Elementary, though, it is revealed that Chief Wiggum "arrested" Bart as a favor, if Bart promises to attend Ralph Wiggum's birthday party, although he forgets to go to the party, and gets in trouble with Chief Wiggum. Meanwhile, Lisa is having difficulty making friends, and actually gets a B+ on a test. Bart, noticing his sister's gloomy mood, lies to several popular school girls that Lisa is a friend of an immensely popular teen singer named Alaska Nebraska (voiced by Elliot Page). Marge and Homer learn that they will be visited by a school inspector to confirm that the Waverly Hills apartment is indeed the residence of Lisa and Bart, so Homer moves in and befriends two college boys.

Homer adopts a bachelor lifestyle, playing videogames and attending parties with his newfound college friends, and he and Marge begin to act as though they were newly dating. Lisa has become popular with several of her classmates, but only because they want backstage passes to an upcoming Alaska Nebraska concert. Lisa sneaks into Alaska's dressing room and pleads her case, but Alaska is unsympathetic and Lisa is removed from the venue by security. She admits to her fair-weather friends that she was not Alaska Nebraska's friend, and the girls chase her, but she loses them.

Meanwhile, the ominous school inspector visits Homer's Waverly Hills apartment. Homer and Marge frantically lay out toys and Krusty the Clown dolls in an effort to convince the inspector that the children live there. While he is getting inside, he uses a captive bolt pistol to shoot out the lock. He concludes that the apartment is the residence of the Simpson children, but admits that he was "hoping to kill [Homer and Marge] and make it look like a suicide." Lisa and Bart, however, plead to return to Springfield Elementary. Lisa in particular wishes to return, because she would rather "be ostracized for being me, not who I pretend to be." Marge and Homer concur, but wistfully state that they will miss their "love nest" apartment. The episode concludes with Homer and Marge using the backyard treehouse as their new love nest, much to Bart's chagrin, but he soon changes his mind when Homer threatens to ground him.

== Cultural references ==
The episode title is based on the Fox series Beverly Hills, 90210.

When stating that she would love to attend elementary school in Waverly Hills, even only for a week, Lisa says that "'tis better to have learned and lost than never to have learned at all", which is inspired by the famous quote from In Memoriam A.H.H. by Alfred, Lord Tennyson, "'tis better to have loved and lost than never to have loved at all".

In the first scene, the company "ScienceWater" is a parody of VitaminWater.

A reworded version of Weezer's "Beverly Hills" plays during a montage of Waverly Hills and the end credits. Alaska Nebraska is a parody of Hannah Montana, but the character's mannerisms are similar to those of Elliot Page's role in Juno. The city inspector is based on Anton Chigurh from the 2007 film No Country for Old Men. In his apartment Homer is shown to have two consoles, Wii and the Xbox 360 on which Homer plays Halo. There is also a painting which looks similar to the canvas Composition with Red, Yellow, and Blue by Piet Mondrian.

A scene from the episode, in which Ralph "teaches" the class after Miss Hoover is granted tenure, is featured in the documentary Waiting for "Superman".

When Chief Wiggum "arrests" Bart for the second time, when Bart failed to show up for Ralph's birthday party, he cites a parody of the Miranda rights: "You have the right to be delighted. If you do not have a gift, one will be provided for you."

Lisa states "L'école, c'est moi" (I am the school, based on the quote "L'état, c'est moi" [I am the state] supposedly spoken by King Louis XIV).

Milhouse and Homer sing "Stand by Me".

== Reception ==
Robert Canning of IGN gave the episode an 8.8/10, calling it the best episode in season 20. He said the school plot had "a level of funny that has become too rare in these latter double-digit seasons", and the subplot with Homer and Marge was "[e]qually as good".

Steve Heisler of The A.V. Club gave the episode a C+. He said there were "a few inspired moments" but was not memorable.

The episode received a total of 6.75 million viewers, making it the most-watched Fox show of the night. "Waverly Hills 9-0-2-1-D'oh" got 18-49 ratings/share and won its timeslot.
