= Lisa the Drama Queen =

- The Simpsons episode
- Promotional image featuring Lisa and Juliet in Equalia
- Episode no.: Season 20; Episode 9
- Directed by: Matthew Nastuk
- Written by: Brian Kelley
- Production code: KABF22
- Original air date: January 25, 2009

Guest appearances
- Fall Out Boy as themselves; Emily Blunt as Juliet Hobbes

Episode features
- Chalkboard gag: "I will not use permanent ink on the chalkboard"
- Couch gag: The family is part of a toy set called "Simpsons Couch Gag #429". The Comic Book Guy slaps a $19.99 price tag on the box and comments, "Worst ... couch gag ... ever!".

Episode chronology
← Previous "The Burns and the Bees"	Next → "Take My Life, Please"
- The Simpsons season 20

"Lisa the Drama Queen" is the ninth episode of the twentieth season of the American animated television series The Simpsons. It originally aired on the Fox network in the United States on January 25, 2009, and guest-starred Emily Blunt as Juliet. This is the last hold-over episode from the season 19 (KABF) production line. It is also the last episode to air in 4:3 standard television.

The episode is very loosely based on the 1994 film Heavenly Creatures.

== Plot ==
When Homer forces the kids to take classes at the recreation centre, Lisa takes part in a strict art class and meets a girl named Juliet Hobbes, who also likes Josh Groban. The two create a fantasy world that takes them away from reality. They deem the land "Equalia" where they are the queens and everybody is equal. However, Lisa soon becomes distracted in school after becoming obsessed with the imaginary land. After meeting Juliet's family and seeing her disruptive behavior, Marge thinks Lisa's friend might be troubled, and after she becomes obsessed in their dreamworld, Marge attempts to stop her from seeing Juliet, much against Marge's original idea of trying to get Lisa a best friend.

The next day, Lisa is invited by Juliet to run away to a run-down restaurant where they intend to live while they complete their writing. Lisa misses her Model UN meeting, where she was going to represent Azerbaijan. Martin contacts Marge and tells her about Lisa's disappearance. Marge immediately goes looking for Lisa, but cannot find her. Jimbo, Dolph, and Kearney, who use the restaurant as their hideout, find and trap Lisa and Juliet, locking them in cages. Dolph and Jimbo leave, and the girls escape by distracting Kearney with stories about Equalia. Dolph and Jimbo try to destroy the girls' manuscripts, but Kearney now believes in the idea of Equalia and attacks them—in his mind he becomes a dragon and overcomes them, but in reality Dolph and Jimbo are beating him up while he smiles dreamily and obliviously. After escaping, Lisa tells Juliet that she wants to continue living in the real world and forget about Equalia; a disappointed Juliet abandons her to pursue the imaginary world forever, causing Lisa to conclude that Juliet is crazy.

Two months later, Lisa is back at home with a rejection slip from a publishing company to whom she had sent her Equalia manuscript. Homer is then prompted to make his own fantasy story, based on his experiences as a father, which goes no further than him re-imagining the family in forms more pleasing to him: Bart is a hot dog, Lisa is a starfish, Marge is a bottle of Duff Beer, and Maggie is a monster truck.

== Production ==
The episode was written by Brian Kelley and directed by Matthew Nastuk. It was the first episode Kelley wrote after five seasons of being absent from The Simpsons. A special version of the end credits theme was performed by the band Fall Out Boy, who were named after a character in the series, but they did not guest star in the actual episode. The episode guest-starred Emily Blunt as Juliet. This was the last episode in the series to be produced and broadcast in standard definition in 4:3, and is the first regular episode to begin right after the opening credits without a commercial break, with episodes now using a four-act structure, and the last episode to use the original opening sequence starting from season 2.

== Cultural references ==
The episode is partially inspired by the 1994 Peter Jackson film Heavenly Creatures, which was in turn based on Pauline Parker and Juliet Hulme, two friends who together murdered Parker's mother. As their friendship progressed, they formed an elaborate fantasy life together. They would often sneak out and spend the night acting out stories involving the fictional characters they had created. Speaking to the podcast Gayest Episode Ever in 2024, Kelley explained that while the genesis for the episode was the 1994 film, the script diverged significantly from the source material. "I never had Marge getting murdered, obviously, but I believe that my original pitch had Juliet burning down Springfield Elementary," he said. "As for the sexual attraction between the girls in Heavenly Creatures, I was never going anywhere near that. I really, really hate episodes where Lisa 'dates' anyone." The film Bridge to Terabithia is also referenced in the episode. Nelson also plays with a headless action figure of Darth Vader.

Lisa and Juliet share a love for American singer Josh Groban. Groban's songs "You Are Loved (Don't Give Up)", "So She Dances" and "In Her Eyes" are featured in the episode. After hosting the Simpsons for dinner, Juliet's father plays track three "Researching the Brief" from James Horner's soundtrack to The Pelican Brief. In the scene when the girls visit the folk art museum, a version of "Wipe Out" by The Surfaris is played. Here the girls see paintings based on the work of American outsider artist Henry Darger. The restaurant is called Clam-Elot, in reference to legendary Camelot of King Arthur.

Juliet exhibits several symptoms that strongly suggests she may be suffering from Maladaptive Daydreaming Disorder, including excessive fantasy, dissociative absorption and extremely vivid, life-like daydreams.

== Reception ==
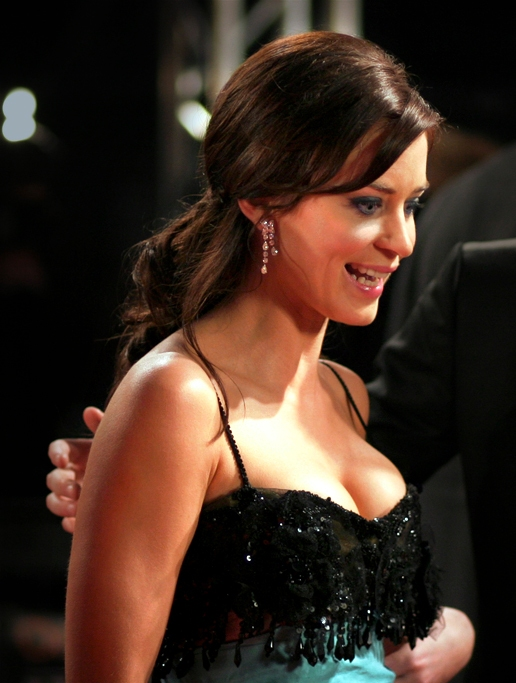
Emily Blunt voiced the character Juliet

"Lisa the Drama Queen" was watched by 5.75 million viewers during its first airing.

Since airing, the episode has received mixed reviews from television critics.

Erich Asperschlager of TV Verdict wrote: "It's no secret that The Simpsons isn't what it used to be. The past few seasons have been hit or miss, but once in a while an episode comes along that reminds me why I've kept watching. 'Lisa the Drama Queen' is one of those episodes."

Robert Canning of IGN commented: "It's been argued that Lisa episodes of The Simpsons are basically hit and miss. In my opinion, the boring, unfunny Lisa episodes far outweigh the classic Lisa episodes. 'Lisa the Drama Queen' was one of those episodes that fell into the boring majority. There were a number of reasons for this—too many song montages, for one—but ultimately it boiled down to the uninspired storyline."
