= Double, Double, Boy in Trouble =

- The Simpsons episode
- Episode no.: Season 20; Episode 3
- Directed by: Michael Polcino
- Written by: Bill Odenkirk
- Production code: KABF14
- Original air date: October 19, 2008

Guest appearance
- Joe Montana as himself

Episode features
- Chalkboard gag: There is no such month as "Rocktober"
- Couch gag: In a parody of The Wizard of Oz, the family gets sucked up in a tornado and, now in black and white, are transported to a farm.

Episode chronology
← Previous "Lost Verizon"	Next → "Treehouse of Horror XIX"
- The Simpsons season 20

"Double, Double, Boy in Trouble" is the third episode of the twentieth season of the American animated television series The Simpsons. It first aired on the Fox network in the United States on October 19, 2008 and in the United Kingdom on November 30, 2008. The episode was written by Bill Odenkirk and directed by Michael Polcino.

In this episode, Bart meets a rich boy named Simon Woosterfield, who happens to be Bart's exact look-alike. Because of this, the two decide to switch homes; Simon enjoys his time with the Simpsons while Bart discovers his rich new half-brother and sister are out to kill Simon, so they can inherit the vast Woosterfield family fortune. Former NFL football player Joe Montana guest stars as himself. In its original airing, the episode garnered 8.09 million viewers. It received mixed reviews.

== Plot ==
Homer and Bart are at the Kwik-E-Mart, where Apu tries to get Homer to buy the last lottery ticket. Before Homer buys the ticket, Bart attempts to jump off a shelf into Chief Wiggum's cart full of marshmallows. However, Wiggum moves the cart, and Homer must catch his son while Lenny buys the ticket. Lenny wins $50,000 and spends his winnings on a party at the Woosterfield Hotel for his friends. Before leaving for the party, Bart accidentally sprays Marge with cat urine. Homer and Marge wonder if Bart misbehaves because pregnant Marge accidentally swallowed a drop of champagne. At Lenny's party, Bart discovers that Lenny will give out vacuuming robots as gifts. Bart activates them, and they attack the guests. Marge takes away Bart's non-dice board game privileges since she already took away his television and video game privileges. In the bathroom, Bart meets Simon Woosterfield, a kid who looks like Bart and is part of a billionaire family.

The boys secretly switch places. Bart likes his new life until he meets his half-siblings, Devan and Quenly, who resent Simon for blocking their full inheritance of the family fortune. Simon refuses to eat Marge's noodles with root beer and Cheetos, so Homer eats it. When Simon is sent to bed without supper after calling Homer a spew monkey, Marge gives him pizza with no crusts and tucks him in, which Simon likes. When the Woosterfields hold a party for their friends, Devan and Quenly lock Bart in the Woosterfield mausoleum, but Mr. Burns frees him. He tells Bart he was the youngest in a wealthy family and implies he killed his siblings. Bart realizes that Devan and Quenly want to murder Simon so they can take his share of the inheritance.

When Simon listens politely to Grampa's stories, Lisa concludes that Simon is an imposter. He explains to the Simpsons that Devan and Quenly are taking Bart to Aspen where they will try to kill him. Before the Simpsons get to him, Quenly pushes Bart down a hill for experienced skiers. When Devan says that they will split Simon's inheritance, Quenly offers Devan a poisoned baked potato to snare the fortune for herself. Homer manages to save Bart after jumping off a ski lift. The family says goodbye to Simon, who is welcomed to his family again. Newly appreciative of his family, Bart is tucked into bed by Marge.

== Cultural references ==
The episode's plot is a parody of Daphne du Maurier's 1957 novel The Scapegoat, while Simon's horse Shadowfax is named after Gandalf's horse from The Lord of the Rings series. The plot is also based on the 1881 novel The Prince and the Pauper by Mark Twain. The episode's couch gag, with the family being swept up in a tornado and taken to a black and white farm is a reference to The Wizard of Oz. Additionally, Apu has an issue of Tales from the Kwik-E-Mart, a parody of the comic series Tales from the Crypt. Early in the episode, Homer makes a reference to Dennis the Menace.

One sequence features Bart passing the mansions of several celebrities, including actor Macaulay Culkin (shown in his scream pose from the 1990 film Home Alone), Fleetwood Mac's Mick Fleetwood and Stevie Nicks (shown posing in the same way as the cover of their 1977 album Rumours), and "McDreamy" and "McSteamy", referring to the characters Derek Shepherd and Mark Sloan from the medical drama series Grey's Anatomy, as well as an actual McDonald's restaurant. Inside the Woosterfield mansion, Simon's room features a ceiling from one of Saddam Hussein's palaces.

Songs featured in the episode include "Thank You for Being a Friend" by Andrew Gold, the song used as the opening to the series The Golden Girls, which Lenny sings. Marge sings "Scrubbing You" while washing up, to the tune of Minnie Riperton's "Lovin' You" and the "Notre Dame Victory March" plays when Joe Montana appears.

== Reception ==
The episode had an approximate 8.09 million viewers.

Robert Canning of IGN said, "It was a far from groundbreaking episode, to be sure, but our familiarity of the characters and the fair amount of laughs made for yet another pleasurable viewing experience". He went on to state, "The story as a whole was interesting and the jokes were funny enough to elicit several audible guffaws" and rated the episode a 7.8 out of 10.

Steve Heisler of The A.V. Club gave the episode a C. He thought that it was "a boring, flat, contrived episode" with an "uninteresting Bart" and thought Homer's stupidity was "offensive". However, he liked the word jokes for Aspen and its storefronts.

Erich Asperschlager of TV Verdict said, "'Double Double' scores a solid B on the laugh-o-meter. While there weren't many guffaws, I chuckled more than a few times."
