= Lost Verizon =

- The Simpsons episode
- Episode no.: Season 20; Episode 2
- Directed by: Raymond S. Persi
- Written by: John Frink
- Production code: KABF15
- Original air date: October 5, 2008

Guest appearances
- Denis Leary as himself; Brian Grazer as himself

Episode features
- Chalkboard gag: "Teacher's diet is working"
- Couch gag: The family rushes to the viewing area of a mountain, where they are carved into the mountain's face. Bart remarks "¡Ay, caramba!" upon seeing the statue.

Episode chronology
← Previous "Sex, Pies and Idiot Scrapes"	Next → "Double, Double, Boy in Trouble"
- The Simpsons season 20

"Lost Verizon" is the second episode of the twentieth season of the American animated television series The Simpsons. It first aired on the Fox network in the United States on October 5, 2008 and in the United Kingdom on November 9, 2008. The episode was directed by Raymond S. Persi and written by John Frink.

In this episode, Bart becomes envious of his friends and their cell phones. Working at a golf course, Bart takes the cell phone of Denis Leary after the comedian throws it away in anger. Marge, per Leary's advice, activates the GPS system on the phone to track down Bart's every move; catching on, Bart attaches the GPS chip to a bird that migrates to Machu Picchu, Peru. Leary and Brian Grazer, who also appeared in "When You Dish Upon a Star" as himself, both guest star as themselves. The episode received mixed reviews.

== Plot ==
Milhouse calls his friends on his cell phone to tell them about Principal Skinner trying to cross a freeway on foot, but he cannot call Bart, because Bart does not have a cell phone. Bart asks Marge for a phone, but she says she cannot afford one. Bart later walks past a country club and is hit by a golf ball from Dr. Hibbert, who pays Bart for returning the ball to him. Bart then tries to earn money for a phone by retrieving golf balls, until Groundskeeper Willie accuses him of taking his part-time job at the club, and confiscates the golf balls that Bart had. Nearby, Denis Leary swings at his golf ball and misses as his cell phone rings. Leary angrily throws away his phone, which lands beside Bart. Bart claims the phone as his own, and begins impersonating Leary and making prank calls. When Marge overhears Bart and Milhouse's laughter, Milhouse confesses the phone belongs to Leary, so she confiscates it. When Leary calls, Marge apologizes for her son's behavior and offers to return the phone. Leary instead advises that she activate the phone's GPS and returns it to Bart, allowing her and Homer to secretly track Bart's movements.

By tracking Bart, Marge is able to stop him engaging in behaviours she considers dangerous or unsuitable. Lisa discovers her parents spying on Bart and confronts Marge. When Marge attempts to justify her spying on Bart, Lisa tells him about the chip. Bart removes the chip and ties it to a bird, which flies away. Marge, thinking the bird is Bart, assumes he is running away from home. The family leave home to find Bart, who enjoys his freedom being home alone but is afraid at night.

While her parents search a field for Bart, Lisa sees the bird land on the car, and upon seeing the tracking chip on its leg, realises they are following the bird instead of Bart. After doing a little research, she realizes that the bird is a scarlet tanager that is migrating south to Machu Picchu, her dream trip. Lisa deliberately lets the bird go so the family can follow it there. In Machu Picchu, an exhausted Marge swears to be more protective with Bart before falling asleep. She dreams of an Inca god who shows her that the parents of Inca Machu Picchu were overprotective of their children, meaning those children were unprepared to face the conquistadors. Marge realises that she must give Bart more freedom, and when she sees the bird and the tracking trip, returns home. Bart initially behaves disinterestedly on his family's return, but quickly begins clinging to Marge and asking that she never leave him again. Lisa then asks where Maggie is, and it's revealed that she was left behind in Machu Picchu, where she is being worshipped like a god.

== Production ==
During the table read of the script in August 2007, a role meant for actor Matt Damon was included and was performed by Hank Azaria because he was not scheduled to record until later in the month. However, he did not appear in the final version of the episode. The episode was dedicated to Paul Newman, who died on September 26, 2008, nine days before the episode aired. Newman guest starred in the thirteenth season episode "The Blunder Years".

Actor Denis Leary and producer Brian Grazer guest starred as themselves. Grazer previously appeared in the tenth season episode "When You Dish Upon a Star".

== Cultural references ==
The Swedish and Australian bars which Bart prank calls feature numerous references. The Swedish bar is named the "Inga-Bar Beerman" in reference to filmmaker Ingmar Bergman. The image of the barman in profile and another person in the background looking directly into the camera is a visual reference to Bergman's 1966 film Persona, the barman's response to Bart, "I will thank you for showing me the futility of human endeavor" is a reference to Bergman's works often having dark themes such as death, bleakness and betrayal. The Australian barman resembles Michael "Crocodile" Dundee, and his bar is called the "Crocodile Drunkee's", both referencing the 1986 film "Crocodile" Dundee. In his bar window, a partial sticker for the band INXS is seen, as well as the album Business as Usual by Men at Work. The zoom-in places the Australian bar at Fox Studios Australia.

Additionally, Skinner plays a human version of the arcade game Frogger when trying to cross the interstate for gas. Marge receives a collection notice from Allied Peas whose corporate mascot bears a striking resemblance to the Jolly Green Giant while paying for frozen peas on installment, while Bart, Milhouse, and Nelson grill Twizzlers licorice. Bart suggests to Leary's manager that he order New York Yankees hats and Derek Jeter jerseys. Leary is a real life Boston Red Sox fan, a large rival of the Yankees. Leary was born in Massachusetts and went to college at Emerson College in Boston.

When Leary is being teased by Krusty during his golf game, he mentions his real-life role in the movie Ice Age as the voice of Diego the sabertooth tiger.

The episode features two musical montages. During the montage of Homer and Marge tracking Bart the Elvis Costello song "Watch Your Step" is playing, while Bart's golf ball recovery montage is set to Merle Haggard's "Workin' Man Blues".

During Marge’s dream sequence, the Peruvian god shows her how the ancient people never learned how to protect themselves due to their parent’s overprotection. In the scene were the villagers run away in fear at the sight of the conquistadores, the villagers reference the Three Stooges when they yell and run away in the same manner as them. A fat villager even does Curly Howard’s famous “Whoop, whoop, whoop,” yell.

== Reception ==
=== Viewing figures ===
In its original airing, the episode garnered 7.43 million viewers, a 3.6 rating and a 10 share.

=== Critical response ===
Robert Canning of IGN said, "This wasn't a terrible episode, but it just was not funny enough for such a serpentine storyline. Throw in a wasted Denis Leary, and you really start to think that 'Lost Verizon' could have been so much more". He gave the episode a final rating of 6.7/10.

Steve Heisler of The A.V. Club gave the episode a B−. He thought plot was similar to the seventh season episode “Marge Be Not Proud” but felt this episode had the characters state their feeling to no one instead of showing their feelings as in the earlier episode. However, he liked the episode's one-off jokes.

Erich Asperschlager of TV Verdict said, "it is a mostly solid episode, it feels like a missed opportunity for a show that garners more grumbles than acclaim these days".
