= Merl Reagle =

American crossword constructor (1950-2015)

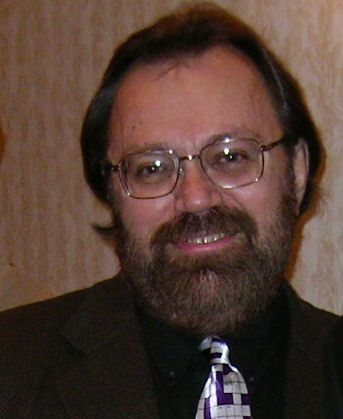
- Reagle in 2005
- Born: January 5, 1950; Audubon, New Jersey, U.S.
- Died: August 22, 2015 (aged 65); Tampa, Florida, U.S.
- Occupations: Crossword constructor, musician
- Spouse: Marie Haley
- Parent(s): Sam and Evelyn Reagle

Merl Harry Reagle (January 5, 1950 – August 22, 2015) was an American crossword constructor. For 30 years, he constructed a puzzle every Sunday for the San Francisco Chronicle (originally the San Francisco Examiner), which he syndicated to more than 50 Sunday newspapers, including the Washington Post, the Los Angeles Times, the Philadelphia Inquirer, the Seattle Times, The Plain Dealer (Cleveland, Ohio), the Hartford Courant, the New York Observer, and the Arizona Daily Star. Reagle also produced crossword puzzles for AARP: The Magazine and the American Crossword Puzzle Tournament.

== Biography ==
Reagle was born in Audubon, New Jersey, on January 5, 1950. He made his first crossword when he was six years old and sold a puzzle to The New York Times at age 16, making him the youngest published Times puzzle constructor at the time. He attended the University of Arizona, but dropped out a few credits short of a degree in English.

Reagle first competed in the American Crossword Puzzle Tournament in 1979, its second year, and placed third. He submitted a puzzle to the contest starting in 1980, and later served as a tournament judge and a commentator for the tournament's finals.

In the early 1980s Reagle began submitting crossword puzzles to Dell crossword magazine, Games magazine, and Margaret Farrar's Simon & Schuster books. He regarded crossword-making as a hobby, working as a television scriptwriter by day and a film scriptwriter by night. In 1985 he was contracted to produce a regular Sunday crossword for the San Francisco Examiner's new Sunday magazine. Three years later, he went into syndication.

In the 1990s Reagle was regarded as one of the top producers of a new, "less stodgy and more hip", type of puzzle. This trend was encouraged by New York Times puzzle editor Will Shortz, who sought to appeal to a wider and younger readership with "pop culture references ... humorous word play, and ... unique and clever themes".

In 2011 Reagle used his expertise to produce an awareness-building campaign for the Alzheimer's Foundation of America. He created the National Brain Game Challenge, an online contest featuring a Sunday crossword that contained a clued secret message. Cash prizes, including a first prize of $2,500, were awarded in two categories, "casual solver" and "puzzle professional".

Reagle was one of the few crossword constructors who made a living solely by making puzzles, as he retained all rights to his puzzles. They are reprinted in books that he sold under his own imprint, PuzzleWorks. With the assistance of his wife, Marie Haley, he published more than 20 volumes of his Sunday crosswords, which he sold on his website. Merl and Marie lived in the Tampa Bay, Florida area.

Reagle died on August 22, 2015, after being hospitalized two days earlier for acute pancreatitis.

== Representative puzzles: humor and wide-open grids ==
New York Times crossword puzzle editor Will Shortz said that Reagle's "themes are consistently fresher and funnier than anyone else's. And he's one of the greatest puzzlemakers at interlocking words in intricate, wide-open patterns". Games magazine called Reagle "the best Sunday crossword creator in America". A poll of puzzlemakers at cruciverb.com, a popular website for crossword constructors, ranked Reagle the most admired by his peers. His 2004 puzzle "Wide Open Spaces" holds the record for the lowest word count (i.e., number of answers) in a Sunday puzzle. The 21 x 21 grid has only 112 words (with 51 black squares). The prolific crossword editor Stanley Newman called Reagle's puzzle "Gridlock" "the best single crossword of the last 25 years". It features a "thick traffic jam of car names crossing in the center".

His fellow constructors routinely credit Reagle for creating some of the funniest puzzle themes. One, "Hit Song", was what he called "Sean Penn's version of "My Way". It included the theme entries I'M IN A / RUSH, NO PICTURES, PLEASE, OR / ELSE YOU'LL LEARN THE / BLACKENED EYE WAY / THE RECORD SHOWS / I'LL BUST YOUR / NOSE IF YOU GET IN... / MY WAY. Other much-discussed puzzles carried titles like "Inappropriate Muzak for a Doctor's Office" and "Least Popular Beanie Babies".

== Portrayal in Wordplay ==
Reagle was noted for making puzzles with pencil and paper, without a computer. The 2006 documentary Wordplay depicts Reagle's construction of a crossword that was later published in The New York Times. The film then shows various famous crossword enthusiasts, including Bill Clinton, Jon Stewart, the Indigo Girls, and Mike Mussina, attempting to solve it.

== Other appearances ==
In the late 1960s and early 1970s Reagle was a member of a psychedelic rock band, Greylock Mansion. He played the organ, sang the lead vocals, and was also the band's main songwriter. Greylock Mansion released two singles in its active period but never got a full album deal. All of its recordings were released in 2016 by an underground label, Lysergic Sound Distributors. (Reagle died during the album's production.) In 2023, television producer Scott Carter debuted a recording of one of Reagle's unreleased songs, "Calliopes and Clowns", on WGCU.

On November 16, 2008, Reagle was a "special guest voice" on The Simpsons episode "Homer and Lisa Exchange Cross Words". In the episode, which features a New York Times crossword, a cartoon version of Reagle appears together with Shortz, and Lisa Simpson discovers messages embedded in both the clues and the puzzle, which Reagle constructed and Shortz edited. The actual crossword appearing that day in the Times had the embedded messages.

Reagle also was featured on CNN, the Today show, Nightline, Oprah, and National Public Radio. In 2013, the Washington Post featured an online interview in its "The Fold" feature.
