= Treehouse of Horror XIX =

- The Simpsons episode
- Episode no.: Season 20; Episode 4
- Directed by: Bob Anderson
- Written by: Matt Warburton
- Production code: KABF16
- Original air date: November 2, 2008

Episode features
- Commentary: Bob Anderson; Matt Groening

Episode chronology
← Previous "Double, Double, Boy in Trouble"	Next → "Dangerous Curves"
- The Simpsons season 20

"Treehouse of Horror XIX" is the fourth episode of the twentieth season of the American animated television series The Simpsons. It first aired on the Fox network in the United States on November 2, 2008. This is the nineteenth Treehouse of Horror episode, and, like the other Treehouse of Horror episodes, contains three self-contained segments: in "Untitled Robot Parody", Transformer robots run amok in Springfield; in "How to Get Ahead in Dead-Vertising", Homer is hired by advertising agents to kill celebrities so their images can be used for free; and in "It's the Grand Pumpkin, Milhouse", Milhouse summons a man-eating pumpkin in a parody of It's the Great Pumpkin, Charlie Brown. It was written by Matt Warburton and directed by Bob Anderson. Shortly after airing, the episode was criticized by the Gay, Lesbian and Straight Education Network (GLSEN) because Nelson Muntz used "gay" as an insult. It was the final Treehouse of Horror episode to be broadcast in 4:3 and in standard definition.

A total of 12.48 million viewers tuned in to watch during its first airing, more than any other episode since "The Wife Aquatic". The episode received mixed reviews from critics, with "It's the Grand Pumpkin, Milhouse" generally regarded as the best segment; critic Matt Zoller Seitz cited the segment as one of The Simpsons' "flashes of greatness" in the later seasons.

== Plot ==
In the opening scene, Homer tries to vote for Democratic candidate Barack Obama in the 2008 United States presidential election. However, the voting machine is rigged to register his vote for Republican candidate John McCain. After six attempts to vote (including actually voting for McCain once in the hopes that it would register for Obama), Homer heads out to report the mishap, but the machine sucks him in and kills him to hide the truth, then shoots his body out of the voting booth. Jasper sticks a patriotic-themed "I voted" sticker on Homer's forehead. The title of the episode and opening credits are shown in red, white and blue in front of him.

=== Untitled Robot Parody ===
In a parody of Transformers, Bart buys Lisa a Malibu Stacy convertible as a Christmas present. However, the car turns out to be a Transformer. The robot transforms all of the technology in Springfield into robots so they can wage war with each other. Just as the two machine factions' leaders prepare to face off, Marge asks why the robots are at war with one another; as it turns out, they cannot even remember. Thanking Marge, the two factions of sentient machines work together to overthrow humanity and use Springfield's residents in a game of human foosball.

=== How to Get Ahead in Dead-Vertising ===
Homer takes Maggie to a daycare and encourages her to enjoy a mural featuring Krusty the Clown to make her feel better while she is away from her parents. However, Krusty is already there to have the images of his face sandblasted from the mural, as his likeness is trademarked and had been used without his permission. This leaves Maggie upset and an outraged Homer shoves Krusty in retaliation, accidentally sending him flying into a wood chipper, shredding him alive. Homer is later approached by two advertising agents who have heard of his deed and explain their plan to use celebrities' likenesses in advertising without issues over permission by simply killing those who refuse to lend their names to advertising. Homer is then hired as a celebrity assassin, taking out such famous faces as actor George Clooney, singer Prince, and astronaut Neil Armstrong. In Heaven, the dead celebrities are outraged by this and stage an attack on the living, with Homer as their main target. Krusty's angel kills Homer, who gets revenge by locking all the celebrities out of Heaven, leaving only himself and the apparently gay Abraham Lincoln.

=== It's the Grand Pumpkin, Milhouse ===
In a parody of It's the Great Pumpkin, Charlie Brown, Bart makes up a character called the Grand Pumpkin, which Milhouse begins to believe in. Milhouse is unable to summon the Grand Pumpkin in front of his friends, who leave for a Halloween party. He starts to cry and his tears and childlike belief bring the Grand Pumpkin to life. However, the Grand Pumpkin (who happens to be racist against yellow pumpkins) is appalled to find that orange pumpkins are carved and eaten on Halloween, and he eats Homer, Nelson Muntz and Groundskeeper Willie for this reason.

Realizing that Milhouse can bring things to life by believing in them, Lisa tells him about "Tom Turkey", a symbol of Thanksgiving. Milhouse starts to believe in Tom Turkey, who comes to life and kills the Grand Pumpkin, freeing everyone he ate. However, when Tom Turkey learns that people eat turkeys on Thanksgiving, he vows revenge and starts angrily chasing children around the school, devouring them as Marge wishes the viewers happy holidays.

== Production ==
The opening segment of the episode, which was leaked onto the Internet weeks before the episode aired, features Homer voting for Barack Obama. Rather than taking sides in the election, executive producer Al Jean says it is "mostly a comment on what many people to believe to be the irregularities in our voting system." "Untitled Robot Parody" is modeled on the live action Transformers film, rather than the cartoon. Al Jean said it was "just really fun to do transformations [and] you can see why they enjoyed doing that film". "How to Get Ahead in Dead-Vertising" featured a parody of the title sequence of Mad Men. Jean was a fan of Mad Men and pitched the scene.

The final segment is based on the Halloween cartoon It's the Great Pumpkin, Charlie Brown. It could not be titled "It's the Great Pumpkin, Milhouse" to exactly match its namesake because of a "big legal issue", according to Al Jean. However, the characters were redesigned to resemble the style of Peanuts, and they also obtained rights to use Vince Guaraldi's music. Jean said in 2011 that "For years we had never been able to parody Charlie Brown's Halloween special, which is one of the all-time top three animated shows ever. The Vince Guaraldi music is such a huge part of it, so we got to clear it. It was just a dream come true to satirize it. I thought it was a really funny idea that instead of not ever seeing the Grand Pumpkin, it comes to life, and he's really horrified at the way humans cook pumpkins into pies, and eat pumpkin seeds, which are basically pumpkin fetuses...."

== Cultural references ==
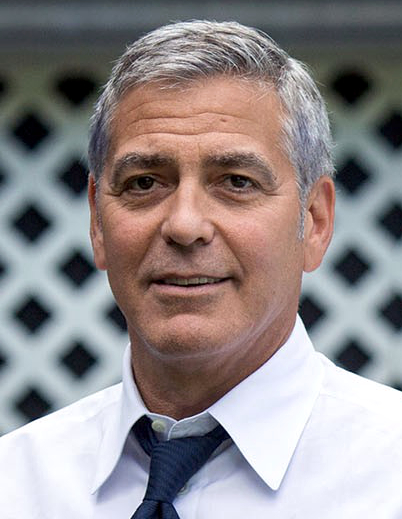
In the second segment, Homer kills celebrities including actor George Clooney

The first segment of the episode is a parody of Transformers. The second segment features a parody of the opening of Mad Men and Homer kills several celebrities, including Kate Winslet, Prince, George Clooney, and Neil Armstrong, set to the song "Psycho Killer" by Talking Heads. Krusty getting killed in a woodchipper references the woodchipper scene from the movie, Fargo. Other celebrities shown include Golda Meir, Edward G. Robinson, John Wayne and John Lennon, who says "All we're saying is 'Let's eat some brains'", a reference to the chorus of "Give Peace a Chance" by the Plastic Ono Band. The commercial "Planet of the Taste" is a parody of the 1968 film Planet of the Apes.

The final segment, "It's the Grand Pumpkin, Milhouse" is a parody of It's the Great Pumpkin, Charlie Brown (and was supposed to be named "It's The Great Pumpkin, Milhouse," but for legal reasons, was renamed) and contains several references to the Peanuts series. In the segment, Milhouse wears the same clothes and plays the same role as Linus van Pelt. Lisa is modeled after Sally Brown and Bart looks like Charlie Brown; he even says "good grief", echoing Charlie Brown's catchphrase. The main theme to Peanuts "Linus and Lucy" is played several times. A redesigned version of Santa's Little Helper can be seen sleeping on top of his dog house and Homer, in a manner similar to Snoopy, is seen sleeping on top of his house. When Marge first speaks, she uses a muted trombone. This is a parody of the "wah wah wah" voice that is used for adults in the various Peanuts specials. At the end of the segment, she says to the audience that they can send complaints to an address which she only says in more muted trombone noises. Milhouse' prayer to the Grand Pumpkin is similar to the Nicene Creed. The dance scene during the Halloween party is a parody of the dance scene in A Charlie Brown Christmas right down to Kang and Kodos in a nonspeaking cameo as the twins 3 and 4.

== Reception ==
In its original airing, the episode was viewed by 12.48 million viewers and achieved a 4.9 Nielsen rating. It was the highest rated episode of the night in the 18–49 demographic, the sixteenth highest rated show of the week, and the fourth highest rated on Fox after two airings of the World Series and House. It was the highest rated episode since season 18's "The Wife Aquatic".

"Treehouse of Horror XIX" received mixed reviews from critics. Rick Bentley of the Seattle Times described it as a "paint-by-numbers episode". Robert Canning of IGN gave the episode a 7.9/10, calling it "funny, entertaining and even nostalgic [which] only makes this yearly tradition that much better."

"It's the Grand Pumpkin, Milhouse" was regarded by reviewers as the best segment in the episode. Canning wrote, "this segment may not be all that gory, but it's funny and, quite honestly, it will just make you feel good", and Bentley described it as "a dead-on comedy assault of the Charlie Brown animated Halloween special." Rob Owen of the Pittsburgh Post-Gazette concurred, writing that it "succeeds because it offers sly cultural commentary." Show Patrol wrote "The nostalgia factor makes “Grand Pumpkin” the best of these amusing bits for me, but they all lack that trademark “Simpsons” brand of satirical smartness." Hal Boedecker of the Orlando Sentinel gave the episode a 4/5 and called the final segment a "witty parody of Charlie Brown's Halloween classic. [...] The best gag, though, is a subtle one. Marge plays a trombone, a loving salute to the way the Peanuts specials portrayed adult voices." Film and television critic Matt Zoller Seitz has cited the segment as one of The Simpsons' "flashes of greatness" in the later seasons, writing in 2016 with Alan Sepinwall that "Whenever you're about to count The Simpsons out, it produces a magnificent segment like... 'It's the Grand Pumpkin, Milhouse'".

Director Bob Anderson received an Annie Award nomination for "Best Directing in an Animated Television Production" but lost to Avatar: The Last Airbender.

=== Controversy ===
The Gay, Lesbian and Straight Education Network (GLSEN), which was in the middle of running a campaign to prevent casual use of the adjective "gay", criticized Nelson Muntz's lyric in the "We Wish You a Merry Christmas" parody, "the Grand Pumpkin's super gay". A spokesperson for the GLSEN said "many people say gay without even realizing what they're saying is bad, we're trying to educate people that this is a term that is hurtful to young people when used in a negative way." The spokesperson added, "Nelson should send an apologetic e-card to Milhouse."
