= Father Knows Worst =

- The Simpsons episode
- Episode no.: Season 20; Episode 18
- Directed by: Matthew Nastuk
- Written by: Rob LaZebnik
- Production code: LABF08
- Original air date: April 26, 2009

Guest appearance
- Marcia Wallace as Edna Krabappel

Episode features
- Chalkboard gag: "I will not put hot sauce in the CPR dummy"
- Couch gag: Marge, Bart, Lisa, and Maggie swim across an Olympic-sized swimming pool to the couch. Homer, however, ends up floating facedown in the water.

Episode chronology
← Previous "The Good, the Sad and the Drugly"	Next → "Waverly Hills, 9-0-2-1-D'oh"
- The Simpsons season 20

"Father Knows Worst" is the eighteenth episode of the twentieth season of the American animated television series The Simpsons. It originally aired on the Fox network in the United States on April 26, 2009. In the episode, Bart and Lisa start struggling in their academic and social lives at school and Homer starts monitoring them and forcing them to do better, becoming a helicopter parent. Meanwhile, Marge discovers a sauna in the basement.

In a subplot, Homer purchases a model kit of Westminster Abbey. In a dream sequence, Homer receives advice from the ghosts of historical figures supposedly buried in Westminster Abbey.

This was the first episode in over eight years written by Rob LaZebnik.

== Plot ==
Homer, Bart and Lisa go to the carnival on the South-Side Sea Port, and Homer indulges in various varieties of kebabs. While devouring them indiscriminately, he accidentally swallows a flaming stick. He tries to douse it out with water, but gets tricked by Bart into drinking lighter fluid (prompting Homer to strangle and breathe fire at him). Following a brief stint in a tongue cast, Homer's taste buds become hypersensitive, making eating ordinary food an ordeal. Lisa remedies the problem by giving Homer cafeteria food from Springfield Elementary, which is so bland that a supertaster like Homer can tolerate it. Homer decides to dine at the elementary school, and even goes so far as to be a cafeteria server to pay for his meals, much to the embarrassment of Bart.

While dining at the school, Homer meets a "helicopter mom", who pressures her son Noah into succeeding by being near him at all times. She makes snide remarks about Homer's children, pointing out how dumb Bart is and how much of a social outcast Lisa is. Homer decides to become a "helicopter parent", fearing that his children's only ambition in life will be to serve children like Noah. Bart must build a balsa wood model to compete in a sculpture assignment, and Homer insists on helping. While shopping for balsa wood, Homer reveals that Bart will build the Washington Monument, but Principal Skinner criticizes this as overly easy. In response, Homer purchases a model kit of Westminster Abbey. He buys a book for Lisa entitled "Chicks with Cliques", and persuades her to try joining a clique, first by declaring that that the United States was founded by a clique with the Continental Congress, and that dolphins swim in "cliques", and then by hosting a cellphone-decorating party for the popular girls.

Homer is convinced that Bart will not build the Abbey model correctly and insists on building it himself. He works late into the night and accidentally falls asleep. During a dream sequence, ghosts of some of the historical figures Homer imagines are buried in Westminster Abbey — Geoffrey Chaucer, Anne of Cleves, and Oscar Wilde (who is actually buried in Paris) — advise Homer to let Bart learn from his mistakes. Homer awakes to find he has accidentally crushed the model beyond recognition. At the competition, Superintendent Chalmers notes that Bart's model is the only one that does not appear "too perfect", and thus believes that Bart's model is the only one that was not constructed with the help of a parent, but Bart declines the award, reveals that Homer did all the work and appeals to the parents to let their kids learn from their own mistakes; having had the same dream as Homer. Lisa too confesses to her father that she no longer wants to be popular, noting that it is "hard work being this shallow".

Meanwhile, Marge changes the water heater in the basement and discovers a hidden sauna, keeping it to herself out of fear that Homer will invite his friends and Moe (the latter of whom—in a scene Marge imagines—does not bring a towel as he believed they would "go Scandinavian"). Marge visits the sauna on a regular basis and is so deeply relaxed that she does not react when Homer tells her of Bart and Lisa's problems. After Homer comes home believing he has failed as a parent, Marge leads him downstairs to the sauna where they revel in steam and relaxation. In the end, Marge douses the sauna rocks with beer and as their towels fall off as the two kiss.

== Reception ==
The episode received a 4.5/6 Nielsen rating and was watched by 5.94 million viewers.

Erich Asperschlager of TV Verdict said "Father Knows Worst" is a "middle-of-the-road" Simpsons episode, as "it lands right in the middle between the best Simpsons episodes and the worst. Even though Marge and Maggie are completely wasted, and Lisa’s storyline barely gets off the ground, seeing Homer try at anything is good for a laugh, especially if that something is parenting and includes him imagining Marge water-skiing on a stegosaurus. Not exactly a model episode, but a decent entry all the same."

Robert Canning of IGN enjoyed the episode. He said, "The main story was entertaining, and the random jokes throughout the episode added to the quality." He went on to say, "All in all, it's tough to complain when the story is solid and the jokes are funny."

In addition, Dan Castellaneta won the Primetime Emmy Award for Outstanding Voice-Over Performance for his role as Homer Simpson in this episode, marking his fourth win for that award.
