= Wedding for Disaster =

- The Simpsons episode
- Episode no.: Season 20; Episode 15
- Directed by: Chuck Sheetz
- Written by: Joel H. Cohen
- Production code: LABF05
- Original air date: March 29, 2009

Guest appearance
- Kelsey Grammer as Sideshow Bob

Episode features
- Chalkboard gag: "My piggy bank is not entitled to TARP funds"
- Couch gag: Four dinner courses resembling Homer, Lisa, Marge, and Bart, and an after-dinner mint resembling Maggie, are served to the Comic Book Guy. He tosses down his napkin after wiping his mouth; its stains form a picture of the family on the couch.

Episode chronology
← Previous "In the Name of the Grandfather"	Next → "Eeny Teeny Maya Moe"
- The Simpsons season 20

"Wedding for Disaster" is the fifteenth episode of the twentieth season of the American animated television series The Simpsons. It originally aired on the Fox network in the United States on March 29, 2009. In this episode, Marge and Homer's second marriage turns out to be invalid, so they decide to get married again. Right before the remarriage, Homer goes missing, and Bart and Lisa suspect that he has been kidnapped by Sideshow Bob. The episode was written by Joel H. Cohen and directed by Chuck Sheetz. It features Kelsey Grammer in his 12th vocal appearance as Sideshow Bob.

Since airing, the episode has received mostly positive reviews from television critics.

It was viewed by 6.58 million viewers in its original American broadcast.

The June 28, 2009 rerun of the episode featured a brief alternate opening. Following the death of Michael Jackson three days prior, on June 25, the music video for "Do the Bartman" was shown, followed by a title card stating "In Memory of Michael Jackson", showing a still of his appearance as Leon Kompowsky (the big, bald mental patient who was put in the insane asylum for believing he really was Michael Jackson) from the episode "Stark Raving Dad".

== Plot ==
His Holiness the Parson, the head of the Presbylutheran denomination, tells Reverend Lovejoy that due to a lapsed ministerial certification, various ceremonies he performed are invalid. This affects Homer and Marge, who turn out not to be married as they previously thought. Homer vows to give Marge the perfect wedding he did not give her either of the first two times they got married. She is thrilled to be able to plan her dream wedding, but it is not long before Marge turns into a bridezilla.

She shoots down all of Homer's ideas, makes impossible demands and mows down everyone who gets in her way. The day of the wedding finally arrives, and everything is perfect except for one small detail; Homer is missing. At first it appears that Marge has driven him away, but Bart and Lisa stumble on a clue, a keychain with the initials "S.B.", and they initially conclude that Sideshow Bob has kidnapped Homer. Meanwhile, Homer finds himself chained to a pipe in a dark room. A mysterious voice tells him that the key to unlock his chains is inside a lollipop, he frantically eats it only to discover the lollipop is made of fiery hot sauce, and ultimately, the key is made out of hot sauce as well.

Bart and Lisa confront Sideshow Bob (who had escaped from jail 14 episodes prior). However, it turns out he was innocent the whole time and had no involvement in Homer's kidnapping, thanks to an alibi from Krusty the Clown, who explained that Bob was with him the whole day the time Homer was kidnapped. After suggesting that "S.B." could be anyone, including the Sultan of Brunei and the Służba Bezpieczeństwa, Bob helps them figure out that the keychain actually belongs to their aunts, Patty and Selma ("S.B." meant Selma Bouvier). Bart and Lisa soon realize that they intentionally kidnapped Homer out of spite for him and have planned to keep him cooped up until Marge forgets about him.

Feeling resigned to his fate, Homer reads the wedding vows he wrote for Marge. Patty and Selma soon have a change of heart after being touched by his wedding vows. Realizing how much Homer truly loves her, they release him, but not before Bart and Lisa catch up to them. Using the keychain as proof of their misdeed, the kids go inside Patty and Selma's apartment and confront them for their actions. Bart and Lisa also blackmail their aunts by threatening to tell their mother the truth about their involvement in Homer's kidnapping unless the twins pay for their parents' remarriage ceremony. Patty and Selma reluctantly agree to do so, and Homer and Marge at last get married outside city hall.

== Cultural references ==
Homer's torture cell and its voice changer reference the Saw film series.

The Parson is modeled after singer and actor Bing Crosby. The singing the Parson does is a reference to Crosby's character as Father O'Malley in Going My Way.

During a fight between Homer and Marge in front of Maggie, Homer calls Marge a "Bridezilla" because of her behaviour during wedding preparation and arrangements, with Marge retaliating by calling him "King Wrong". Maggie then imagines them as King Kong vs. Godzilla.

The other "S.B."s mentioned by Sideshow Bob are Scott Baio, the Sultan of Brunei and the former Polish secret police the Służba Bezpieczeństwa.

== Reception ==
"Wedding for Disaster" received a Nielsen rating of 3.7/6 and was viewed by 6.58 million viewers.

Since airing, the episode has received mostly positive reviews from television critics.

Robert Canning of IGN gave the episode a 7.3/10, saying, "'Wedding for Disaster' was one of those episodes that, while not knocking you down with laughter, was quite fun to watch." He went on to say, "it was also sweet to have Homer's recitation of his vows be the turning point for his sisters-in-law. Again, this wasn't a howlingly funny episode, but there were some great parts, and overall 'Wedding for Disaster' was a pleasant enough telling of Marge and Homer's third and fourth weddings."

Erich Asperschlager of TV Verdict wrote: "'Wedding for Disaster' worked because it had a cool mystery. Granted, I’m a sucker for mysteries, but some of the best Simpsons episodes are mysteries—and most of those feature Sideshow Bob. I was more than ready to let tonight’s episode turn into the next Sideshow Bob story, but I also like that they let him just be a cameo. Much as I love Kelsey Grammer’s scheming sidekick, he’s too smart to have kidnapped Homer for the reason Bart suspected: 'If Mom and Dad don’t get married, I’ll never be born!' The real solution made a lot more sense, and gave the ending a little more weight. 'Wedding for Disaster' may have been a little light on laughs compared to the last few episodes, but the story carried the day."

=== Awards ===
Joel H. Cohen won a Writers Guild of America Award in the Animation category in 2010 for writing the episode.
