= Sex, Pies and Idiot Scrapes =

- The Simpsons episode
- Promotional artwork for the episode, featuring Ned Flanders and Homer Simpson
- Episode no.: Season 20; Episode 1
- Directed by: Lance Kramer
- Written by: Kevin Curran
- Production code: KABF17
- Original air date: September 28, 2008

Guest appearances
- Julia Louis-Dreyfus as Gloria; Robert Forster as Lucky Jim; Joe Mantegna as Fat Tony

Episode features
- Couch gag: The Simpsons are encased in carbonite and taken away by Boba Fett.

Episode chronology
| ← Previous "All About Lisa" | Next → "Lost Verizon" |
- The Simpsons season 20

"Sex, Pies and Idiot Scrapes" is the first episode of the twentieth season of the American animated television series The Simpsons. It originally aired on the Fox network in the United States on September 28, 2008. In the episode, Homer meets bail bondsman Lucky Jim and Wolf the Bounty Hunter after getting charged for being involved in a fight, and they convince him to become a bounty hunter. In a twisted turn of events, he becomes Ned Flanders' partner. Meanwhile, Marge unknowingly begins working at an erotic bakery.

The episode was written by Kevin Curran and directed by Lance Kramer. Julia Louis-Dreyfus returns as Snake's girlfriend Gloria for the third time, seven years after she first did this role in 2001's "A Hunka Hunka Burns in Love," which Kramer also directed. Robert Forster provides the voice of Lucky Jim, and Joe Mantegna returns as the recurring character Fat Tony in the episode.

"Sex, Pies and Idiot Scrapes" has received positive reviews from television critics. It was watched by 9.3 million viewers the night it aired.

== Plot ==
An alcohol-free Saint Patrick's Day parade is interrupted by a brawl between the Nationalist Irish and the Unionist Northern Irish in which Homer participates. A group of hungry children steal Marge's picnic basket. She is saved by Patrick Farrelly, who returns the basket. Marge offers him a cupcake in gratitude, and Patrick offers her a job at his bakery after eating it. Marge realizes that Patrick owns an erotic bakery after seeing Patty and Selma pick out a suggestively-shaped cake. Marge tries to quit, but Patrick says there is nothing wrong with what he is doing. Patrick informs Marge that she has a gift, and Marge agrees to stay.

Due to his involvement in the riot and his criminal history, Homer is arrested and his bail set incredibly high. Homer's bail bondsman Lucky Jim agrees to secure Homer's release if Homer does not skip his bail. Otherwise, he will have to deal with Wolf the Bounty Hunter, who inspires Homer to become a bounty hunter himself. Homer's first mission involves capturing Snake. Homer corners Snake, where Snake pulls out a pistol and fires a shot at Homer. Miraculously, Ned places a sheet of bulletproof glass in front of Homer, which deflects the shot. Ned attempts to convince Snake to come quietly, allowing Homer to capture him by asphyxiating him with a plastic bag. Homer convinces Ned to partner as a bounty hunting duo, and they successfully pursue several bail-jumpers. Homer spoils his family with gifts. Marge is equally proud of her job but confesses to the nature of her work after several embarrassing incidents.

Later, Homer and Ned capture Fat Tony by crashing their car into a subway car. Disgusted by Homer's lawless capture, Ned quits. When Ned learns from Jim that Homer has skipped his bail because of his new job, he fears for Homer, so Ned decides to arrest Homer himself. Ned ambushes Homer and a chase ensues, ending with the two on a beam suspended high over the ground. Homer jumps onto another beam, but Ned fails to land on it, gripping onto the edge of the beam. Homer helps Ned but causes them both to fall and land in a pool of wet cement, which sets before they can escape. Chief Wiggum arrests Homer, who is sentenced to a short stay in jail (where Sideshow Bob is seen escaping). Homer receives a cake from Marge to help get him through his sentence.

== Production ==
"Sex, Pies and Idiot Scrapes" was written by Kevin Curran and directed by Lance Kramer.

== Cultural references ==
The episode title is an allusion to Steven Soderbergh's 1989 directorial debut Sex, Lies, and Videotape. Robert Forster guest stars as bail bondsman Lucky Jim in the episode, the same job his character held in the 1997 film Jackie Brown. The bail bondsman Wolf is a parody of Duane "Dog" Chapman, the star of the series Dog the Bounty Hunter, while one of the bounty hunters lining up to chase Homer down, before Ned takes the job, is Rose McGowan's character Cherry Darling from Robert Rodriguez's 2007 film Planet Terror. In the opening St. Patrick's Day brawl, Marvel Comics characters The Thing and The Incredible Hulk have cameos, while before that Bart notes that he misses the IRA, a reference to the ending of their armed campaign in 2005. When Homer reminisces about the good times he and Ned had, one clip shows the two of them in a Batman-esque fight scene. The episode's couch gag parodies The Empire Strikes Back, with Boba Fett appearing and carrying away the family frozen in carbonite as he had done to Han Solo. When Homer and Ned are stuck in the wet concrete, Ned talks to Homer about the Bible, referencing a scene in Waiting for Godot.

The episode features several musical references. Homer and Ned's song "Kindly Deeds Done For Free" is a parody of "Dirty Deeds Done Dirt Cheap" by AC/DC. Lisa sings "Too Ra Loo Ra Loo Ral" to calm the fighting Irish, and the Eddy Grant song "Electric Avenue" accompanies the montage of Homer and Ned hunting criminals.

The highly choreographed sequence where Ned chases Homer through a construction site is a reference to the 2006 James Bond film Casino Royale. Homer and Ned chasing the subway is a reference to The French Connection.

== Reception ==
The episode originally aired on the Fox network in the United States on September 28, 2008 from 8:00-8:30 p.m. It was watched by 9.3 million people, making it the most-watched Fox cartoon of the night, beating Family Guy, which was second with 9.2 million viewers. At the time, it was the lowest rated season premiere of The Simpsons on record. It was surpassed by the season 21 premiere episode, "Homer the Whopper", which was viewed in 8.31 million homes.

Robert Canning of IGN called it a "fun, if standard, start to Season 20". In the end, he gave a final rating of 7.2/10. Joel Brown of "MeeVee" gave the episode a B−. Justin Gagnon of The Daily Collegian called the episode "worthwhile viewing for both big fans and occasional watchers and proves that even after 20 seasons the show still can dish up some fresh laughs." Screen Rant called it the best episode of the 20th season.

On March 17, 2009 (Saint Patrick's Day), the episode aired alongside episode 14 of season 20, "In the Name of the Grandfather", on Sky One. "In the Name of the Grandfather" was the first episode of The Simpsons to premiere in Europe before the United States.

=== Controversy ===
The episode stirred controversy in Northern Ireland over the brawl that occurred in the opening act of the episode. The brawl, between Irish and Northern Irish people, included Bart's line "Where are the IRA when you need them?" Gregory Campbell, an MP for East Londonderry in Northern Ireland said "The Simpsons is a humorous cartoon but the context of using a line like that about an organisation which caused so much death will lead people to have very mixed views, some people may take it as a light-hearted reference, while others who were affected by the real life violence of the IRA and are still suffering with that legacy, will not."
