= Caramba (disambiguation) =

¡Ay, caramba! is a Spanish language exclamation used to denote surprise.

Caramba may also refer to:

== Music ==
- Caramba (band), a Swedish music group or their 1981 self-titled album
- Caramba, an orchestral overture by William Blezard
- El caramba: canción andaluza, composition for voice and piano or guitar by Ramon Carnicer

=== Albums ===
- Caramba! (album), a 1968 album by Lee Morgan
- ¡Ay Caramba! (album), by Ska Cubano, 2006
- Caramba, by Carmen González, or the title track, 2000
- Caramba, a series of albums by Horst Wende, also known as Roberto Delgado

=== Songs ===
- Hey Caramba, by Compay Segundo
- "Caramba!... Galileu da Galileia" by Jorge Ben from Ben, 1972
- "Caramba! It's the Samba", by Peggy Lee
- "Caramba", by The Champs, 1959

== Other uses ==
- La Caramba, stage name of flamenco singer and dancer Maria Antonia Fernandez (1751–1787)
- FC Caramba Riga, a predecessor of the Riga FC, football club

== See also ==
- Karamba (disambiguation)
