= Krusty the Clown (The Simpsons episode) =

- The Simpsons episode
- Episode no.: Season 30; Episode 8
- Directed by: Matthew Faughnan
- Written by: Ryan Koh
- Production code: XABF22
- Original air date: November 25, 2018

Guest appearances
- Billy Eichner as Billy; Peter Serafinowicz as the CEO

Episode chronology
← Previous "Werking Mom"	Next → "Daddicus Finch"
- The Simpsons season 30

"Krusty the Clown" is the eighth episode of the thirtieth season of the American animated television series The Simpsons, and the 647th episode overall. The episode is directed by Matthew Faughnan and written by Ryan Koh. It aired in the United States on Fox on November 25, 2018.

In this episode, Homer becomes a television recapper while Krusty hides with a circus after he attacks Homer for giving a bad review. Maggie Simpson does not appear in the episode. Billy Eichner and Peter Serafinowicz guest starred. The episode received mixed reviews.

== Plot ==
When the school newspaper starts losing money, Principal Skinner appoints a new editor who demotes Lisa to TV recapper. She soon realizes Homer has a talent for summarizing shows and gives him the job. Homer is successful, but his bad reviews of Krusty the Clown's TV show cause Krusty to become enraged, and he tries to run Homer off the road. With Bart's help, Krusty hides out in a low-budget circus, where he finds happiness as a traditional clown. When the circus goes bankrupt, Krusty bails them out, but is ostracized by the circus people as a TV clown. He returns to TV after being acquitted by a Homer-hostile jury.

Homer's constant recapping causes friction in his marriage and he quits. A TV executive tries to keep Homer on the job, explaining that many of the shows out there don't really exist, but the networks promote them just for the buzz. Homer and Lisa expose the fraud in the school paper, but the article is cancelled and replaced by clickbait.

== Production ==
In September 2018, it was reported that Billy Eichner would guest star in an upcoming episode. Promotional material featuring Eichner was released in November 2018 with a report that Peter Serafinowicz would guest star in the same episode.

== Reception ==
=== Viewing figures ===
"Krusty the Clown" scored a 0.8 rating with a 3 share and was watched by 2.11 million people, making The Simpsons Fox's highest rated show of the night.

=== Critical response ===
Rodney Ho of The Atlanta Journal-Constitution gave the episode an A, stating "In the end, this episode gives aggrandized importance to TV recappers, which I appreciate. But to be honest, I am not certain this part of my job is [as] important as it used to be. Still, because this episode is about my job and I'm an easily manipulated journalistic narcissist, I give this episode an A!"

Tony Sokol of Den of Geek gave the episode 4.5 out of 5 points, stating "'Krusty the Clown' is a great episode, good enough to be on season 4. It's funny, character-driven and dare I say it? Timely, as overused a word in reviewing as the use of the comic rule of three on The Simpsons."

Dennis Perkins of The A.V. Club gave the episode a B− ranking, stating "The Simpsons used to be, can be, and occasionally still is a razor-sharp and hilarious critic of pop culture itself, and 'Krusty the Clown' shows what happens when the show's creators swing and miss."

=== Awards and nominations ===
Ryan Koh was nominated for a Writers Guild of America Award for Outstanding Writing in Animation at the 71st Writers Guild of America Awards for his script for this episode but lost to Stephanie Gillis, who wrote The Simpsons episode "Bart's Not Dead".
