= I'm Dancing as Fat as I Can =

- The Simpsons episode
- Episode no.: Season 30; Episode 13
- Directed by: Matthew Nastuk
- Written by: Jane Becker
- Production code: YABF06
- Original air date: February 10, 2019

Guest appearance
- Ted Sarandos as himself

Episode features
- Couch gag: The Simpsons arrive at the couch, where a heart shaped chocolate box is located, and fill the spot in it. Mr. Burns grabs Homer and tries to eat him, just to spit him out in disgust and Homer exclaims "D'oh!"

Episode chronology
← Previous "The Girl on the Bus"	Next → "The Clown Stays in the Picture"
- The Simpsons season 30

"I'm Dancing as Fat as I Can" is the thirteenth episode of the thirtieth season of the American animated television series The Simpsons, and the 652nd episode overall. The episode was directed by Matthew Nastuk and written by Jane Becker. It aired in the United States on Fox on February 10, 2019.

In this episode, when Homer watches a television show without Marge, he seeks forgiveness from her by learning how to dance while Bart competes to win a shopping cart full of toys. Businessman Ted Sarandos guest starred as himself. The episode received positive reviews.

== Plot ==
Late at night, Marge receives a call saying that her aunt Eunice is dying and that she must fly to Gainesville, Florida to visit her. Before leaving, Marge makes Homer promise to not watch the new season of Odder Stuff (a parody of Stranger Things) on Netflix without her. Marge, Patty and Selma go to Eunice's house and Patty and Selma start deciding what they want to inherit, but Eunice finds out and attacks them with a lamp.

While Homer looks after Maggie, Bart and Lisa start watching Odder Stuff. Not wanting to break his promise, Homer quickly turns the TV off but at work the next day is horrified to find his colleagues watching the show, leading to him resorting to watch other shows on Netflix to resist the temptation. A vision of Ted Sarandos convinces Homer to finally watch Odder Stuff, but as he reaches the end of the season, Marge returns home after Eunice's unexpected recovery and gets angry at him for breaking his promise.

Another vision of Sarandos offers Homer advice, telling him that Marge loves watching dance shows. Following this advice, Homer goes to the "Some of That Jazz" dance studio to start learning to dance. His instructor Julia has trouble teaching him, so she calls in Sweet Sal, a much tougher instructor. As a cover story, Homer tells Marge each night that he is going to Moe's Tavern until Marge begins to doubt Homer's story. Homer invites Marge out, saying he will make it all clear at The Snow Ballroom, and they reconcile by dancing together.

Meanwhile, Krusty hosts an essay-writing contest called Hello Krusty's: Krusty's Toy Trample!, with the prize being a five-minute dash in his toy store, after which the winner gets to keep all the toys they looted. Bart, Milhouse and Ralph Wiggum are announced as the finalists at the Toy Trample. The contest is close between Bart and Milhouse, but in the end Ralph wins by grabbing both of their carts. Ralph gives Lisa a toy pony, as a thank you for writing his essay for the Toy Trample.

== Production ==
Because the story had Homer being tempted to watch Netflix, the producers thought it would be funny to have Ted Sarandos, who at the time was Netflix's chief content officer, tempt Homer. Executive producer Al Jean said that he was funny and easy to direct. Although The Simpsons creator Matt Groening's show Disenchantment was distributed on Netflix, Jean said that it had no influence in including Sarandos in the episode.

== Cultural references ==
The show Homer and Marge are watching is a parody of Stranger Things. Ted Sarandos is also dressed as the Demogorgon, a monster that appears in Stranger Things.

== Reception ==
=== Viewing figures ===
During its first broadcast, the episode attracted 1.75 million viewers with a 3 share.

This episode was the first episode to have fewer than two million viewers. However, the audience for this episode may have been impacted by the simultaneous broadcast, on CBS, of the 61st Grammy Awards ceremony.

=== Critical response ===
Dennis Perkins of The A.V. Club gave the episode a B−, stating "'I'm Dancing As Fat As I Can' works refreshingly well otherwise, as long as the episode sticks to the story it’s designed to tell...The episode is written by Simpsons first-timer Jane Becker, who's got some Rick And Morty under her belt, and who exhibits a promising understanding of what makes a Marge and Homer story tick, something that’s a lot trickier than it looks."

Tony Sokol of Den of Geek gave the episode 3 out of 5 stars, stating "The issue of binge-watch bonding is a deeply personal one, and Lisa's very moving reaction to her parents having a moment is very effective...One of the best things about Marge and Homer's marriage is that it is constantly on the verge of collapse. This offers a multitude of opportunities for redemption, something Homer usually does with a grand gesture. Some of his grand gestures have been completely accidental, such as when he landed at Marge's feet in a hail of roses. Homer studies hard to make this particular gesture. It is a true work out that works out. Things didn't always work out for the Simpsons even in their happiest of endings and I miss the ambiguity."
