= Sacré Bleu =

Sacré bleu, an alternative spelling of Sacrebleu, may refer to:

- Sacre Bleu Cross, a theatrical cartoon of the 1960s' The Inspector series
- Sacré Blues, a book by Taras Grescoe
- "Sacre Bleu", a song by The Balham Alligators
- Sacré Bleu, a novel by Christopher Moore
