= From Russia Without Love =

- The Simpsons episode
- Episode no.: Season 30; Episode 6
- Directed by: Matthew Nastuk
- Written by: Michael Ferris
- Production code: XABF20
- Original air date: November 11, 2018

Guest appearances
- Jon Lovitz as Hacky/Snitchy the Weasel; Ksenia Solo as Anastasia Alekova

Episode features
- Chalkboard gag: "I will not order pregnant rats" is written on the streets during the episode.
- Couch gag: The couch acts like a toaster and five pieces of toasted bread resembling the family pop out of the toaster. The toast that looks like Homer burns into a crisp and says "D'oh!" in response.

Episode chronology
| ← Previous "Baby You Can't Drive My Car" | Next → "Werking Mom" |
- The Simpsons season 30

"From Russia Without Love" is the sixth episode of the thirtieth season of the American animated television series The Simpsons, and the 645th episode overall. The episode was directed by Matthew Nastuk and written by Michael Ferris. It aired in the United States on Fox on November 11, 2018.

In this episode, Bart orders a mail-order bride for Moe as a practical joke, but Moe, who is attracted to her, keeps his distance until Homer encourages him to confess his feelings. However, he discovers that she is an American scammer, so he leaves her. Jon Lovitz and Ksenia Solo guest starred. The episode was watched by 2.35 million viewers and received mixed reviews. Hank Azaria was nominated for the Primetime Emmy Award for Outstanding Character Voice-Over Performance for his performance in this episode.

== Plot ==
Concerned that they are inviting too many people over to Thanksgiving dinner as they drink too much, Marge asks Homer to uninvite Moe. A depressed Moe then stops reacting angrily to Bart's prank calls, so Bart, Milhouse and Nelson decide to up their game by accessing the dark web with the help of Herman. They order a mail order wife for Moe, a beautiful woman named Anastasia who shows up at the bar. Moe denies sending for her but allows her to stay. She transforms the bar into a high-class establishment. Moe is smitten with Anastasia, but has had his heart broken too many times and refuses to become romantically involved, so she decides to move out and take a job at the Russian Tea House in Odgenville.

However, Homer sees Bart receiving a dark web package from Herman under the name "Ima Buttface", a pregnant Sumatran breeding rat, and becomes suspicious. He and Marge interrogate Bart and threaten to destroy his phone until he confesses his dark web dealings. While Marge gives Bart a series of punishments, Homer rushes off to tell Moe the truth and encourages him to fight for Anastasia. Moe tracks her down to the Tea House she is working at, only to see her dating Krusty. With the encouragement of the barflies, he crashes their picnic date and confesses his love for Anastasia. She breaks up with Krusty and agrees to honor the contract.

Bart is then cajoled into helping out at Moe and Anastasia's wedding, which Marge says will be Bart's last punishment. However, he, Milhouse and Nelson have learned Russian off the dark web and realize the marriage contract is actually a legal document giving Anastasia all the rights to Moe's property; and promptly expose this at the altar. When this is made known to Moe, he refuses to marry her as she had lied to him about the contract. To his horror, Anastasia then admits she is actually an American scam artist. Moe then orders her to leave, so she proceeds to seduce Groundskeeper Willie by pretending to be Scottish.

== Production ==
Ksenia Solo guest starred as Anastasia, a mail-order bride for Moe. Jon Lovitz appeared as Hacky, a computer helper icon.

== Reception ==
=== Critical response ===
Tony Sokol of Den of Geek gave the episode 3 and a half out of 5 points ranking, stating the episode "comes after a thawing on the crucible of social media fit a square peg into an oval orifice. There is no political commentary in the episode, and the social commentary is only on the catfish. The international incident turns out to be all too domestic. 'From Russia Without Love' is a long sad look into Moe. Something most communities prefer to avert their eyes from. But Springfield isn't just any neighborhood. It doesn't even know what state it's in. The episode ends on further sorrow as Nelson gets stranded on an outpost a planet away where smokes are hard to come by. Featuring the two secondary characters lets the series breathe a little less shallowly as The Simpsons 30th season finds them looking back at narrative and internal development."

Dennis Perkins of The A.V. Club gave the episode a C+, stating "There's just too little investment in the script (credited to Michael Ferris) in either the emotional side of Moe's dilemma or the potential dark comedy inherent in the whole mail-order plot. Weirdly, I was put in mind of the early-run Aqua Teen Hunger Force episode (called 'Mail Order Bride') on the same subject, where at least that intermittently brilliant show's grimy chaos felt at home to the latter theme...Here, 'From Russia Without Love' tries to go light and dark at once, and can't manage either.

=== Viewing figures ===
"From Russia Without Love" scored a 0.9 rating with a 4 share and was watched by 2.35 million viewers, making The Simpsons Fox's highest rated show of the night.

=== Awards and nominations ===
Hank Azaria was nominated for the Primetime Emmy Award for Outstanding Character Voice-Over Performance at the 71st Primetime Creative Arts Emmy Awards for his performance in this episode as Moe Szyslak, Carl Carlson, Duffman, and Kirk Van Houten.
