= Girl's in the Band =

- The Simpsons episode
- Episode no.: Season 30; Episode 19
- Directed by: Jennifer Moeller
- Written by: Nancy Cartwright
- Production code: YABF11
- Original air date: March 31, 2019

Guest appearances
- J. K. Simmons as Victor Kleskow; Dave Matthews as Lloyd

Episode features
- Chalkboard gag: "I am not a grandmother"
- Couch gag: Homer arrives at the couch, with the whole scene, except him, in black and white, then he says "D'oh!" in response.

Episode chronology
← Previous "Bart vs. Itchy & Scratchy"	Next → "I'm Just a Girl Who Can't Say D'oh"
- The Simpsons season 30

"Girl's in the Band" is the nineteenth episode of the thirtieth season of the American animated television series The Simpsons, and the 658th episode overall. It aired in the United States on Fox on March 31, 2019. The episode was directed by Jennifer Moeller.

It is also the first episode written by Nancy Cartwright, voice actor of Bart Simpson among others, making her the third of six main cast members to have an episode to their name. Many scripts since season 11 having been co-written by Dan Castellaneta, who voices Homer Simpson among others, and Harry Shearer, voice of many main supporting characters, writing the season 28 episode "Trust but Clarify". This also makes Cartwright the first female main cast member with a writing credit for the show.

In this episode, Lisa is selected for a youth orchestra where she undergoes harsh training while her family makes sacrifices to support her. Actor J. K. Simmons makes his fifth guest appearance in the series as Victor Kleskow in homage to his abusive instructor role in the 2014 film Whiplash. Musician Dave Matthews guest starred as Lloyd. The episode received mixed reviews.

== Plot ==
Springfield Elementary School's music teacher and band director Dewey Largo wakes up from a nightmare next to his partner Geoffrey and recalls how even though he graduated top of his class, his once-promising musical conductor career failed and led him to teach elementary music where he is now unhappy.

At school, Largo is conducting the school orchestra when he receives an email from Victor Kleskow, the musical director of the Capital City Philharmonic, saying he will be attending the concert the next night. Largo, newly inspired to impress Kleskow, starts training the students with "The Stars and Stripes Forever". The next night the concert is a success with the children playing "Troika" from Lieutenant Kije, but Largo is sad when instead of poaching him, Kleskow chooses to take Lisa Simpson for his youth orchestra.

Homer and Marge struggle to schedule and pay for Lisa's new extracurricular school work. Once they arrive at Capital City, Lisa finds it difficult to work with Kleskow, as he reveals his menacing personality and how just small mistakes make him angry.

To earn extra money Homer starts working the night shift to pay for Lisa's participation in the orchestra. Meanwhile, at the new orchestra's campus, Bart is confined to a closet with the siblings of the other student musicians. Lisa wins the first chair for saxophone in a competition, but her smile turns into a frown when she notices the toll her new music lessons and associated travel times are taking on her family.

Kleskow offers to advance Lisa to the next class, which costs more and is farther away, so she refuses, yet Kleskow insists she try out. Meanwhile, Homer is seemingly sleep-deprived and starts hallucinating during his shift at the nuclear power plant - dancing and drinking with the bartender Lloyd from The Shining. To avoid more problems for her and her family, Lisa intentionally fails her audition for the upper-level orchestra, ending her saxophone career.

== Production ==
Nancy Cartwright had pitched ideas for episodes previously but had been turned down because they were similar to previous episodes. She pitched her idea for this episode based on her childhood and her family's support for her niece, Sabrina Carpenter. Although she was the voice of Bart, it did not occur to her to write an episode focused on him since she related more to Lisa. After writing the script and turning it in, she sat in the writers room as they added ideas to the script. One of those ideas was adding the references to the 2014 film Whiplash. Cartwright was able to write the chalkboard gag for the episode but not the couch gag. The other voice actors did not know that Cartwright had written the episode until they sat for the table read.

Actor J.K. Simmons was cast after the Whiplash references were added. Musician Dave Matthews guest starred as Lloyd, a bartender who tells Homer how to kill his family.

== Cultural references ==
Victor Kleskow is a parody of Whiplash character Terence Fletcher, and both were played by actor J. K. Simmons.

== Reception ==
=== Viewing figures ===
"Girl's in the Band" scored a 0.8 rating with a 4 share and was watched by 2.07 million people.

=== Critical response ===
Dennis Perkins from The A.V. Club gave the episode a B− stating, "Working through a conflict on The Simpsons is a lot harder than it looks. We have to start at one and return to one, all in 20-odd minutes, and all in a world that can never fundamentally change. So the conflict here means Lisa and her family each have to come to terms with a seemingly insoluble problem, all while staying true to each character, and not short-changing anyone in the necessary resolution. It’s harder, I maintain, on a show like this than on a more conventionally serialized show, where arcs can affect the whole in a more permanent way going forward. Still, a great episode of The Simpsons finds a way to do that... 'Girl’s In The Band' isn’t a bad effort at finding that narrative and the comedic sweet spot that made The Simpsons, The Simpsons—but it’s an incomplete and unsatisfying one."

Tony Sokol of Den of Geek gave the episode a 4 out of 5 stars. He felt as if Lisa had written the episode while Bart wrote the jokes.
