= ¡Ay, caramba! =

Phrase; exclamation used in Spanish to denote surprise

"¡Ay, caramba!" (pronounced [ˈaj kaˈɾamba]), from the Spanish interjections ay (denoting surprise or pain) and caramba (a minced oath for carajo), is an exclamation used in Spanish to denote surprise (usually positive).

== In popular culture and arts ==
The exclamation became associated with the Madrid flamenco dancer and singer La Caramba in the 1780s. Her headdress of brightly colored ribbons became known as a caramba.

The knife-throwing villain in The Broken Ear (1935), a comic book in the Adventures of Tintin series, exclaims "Caramba! Missed again!" so often it became a catchphrase in French ("Caramba, encore raté!")

In the 1944 Disney movie The Three Caballeros, Panchito Pistoles screams "Ay, caramba!" and José Carioca asks what it means, but Panchito does not know.

Ricky Ricardo in I Love Lucy (1951-1957) used to say, “Ay, Caramba!” quite often when exasperated by his lovely Lucy.

¡Caramba! (1983) is the title of a painting by Herman Braun-Vega where the painter expresses surprise while seeing himself surrounded by so many of his masters in painting.

The fictional character Bart Simpson (voiced by Nancy Cartwright) popularized the phrase "¡Ay, caramba!" in the animated sitcom The Simpsons. He said it first in the 1988 short The Art Museum, one of several one-minute Simpsons cartoons that ran as interstitials on The Tracey Ullman Show from April 14, 1987 to May 14, 1989 on Fox, and he has used the catchphrase consistently throughout the series. The Simpsons even self-parodied Bart's use of the catchphrase, as well as the catchphrases of many of its other characters, in the 1994 episode "Bart Gets Famous".

== See also ==
- D'oh!
- Facepalm
- Sacrebleu
