= Baby You Can't Drive My Car =

- The Simpsons episode
- Episode no.: Season 30; Episode 5
- Directed by: Timothy Bailey
- Written by: Rob LaZebnik
- Production code: XABF18
- Original air date: November 4, 2018

Guest appearance
- Tracy Morgan as Tow Truck Driver

Episode features
- Couch gag: The family rushes in to the room and sits on five exercise bikes respectively. Suddenly, Marge, Lisa, Maggie, and Bart use their bikes to leave the room, leaving Homer as the only one still in the room. As his bike is not moving, Homer says "D'oh!".

Episode chronology
← Previous "Treehouse of Horror XXIX"	Next → "From Russia Without Love"
- The Simpsons season 30

"Baby You Can't Drive My Car" is the 644th episode of the American animated television series The Simpsons and the fifth episode of the thirtieth season. It aired in the United States on Fox on November 4, 2018. The episode was directed by Timothy Bailey and written Rob LaZebnik.

In this episode, Homer and Marge are hired to work at a self-driving car company but become concerned with how the company makes money. Tracy Morgan guest starred as a tow truck driver. The episode received positive reviews.

== Plot ==
Homer eats while he drives to the power plant. At the entrance, the car hits a speed-bump and crashes into Mr. Burns' office. Angered, Burns fires Homer. Later, Homer sees a news item for a startup company, CarGo, where Mayor Quimby touts jobs that will benefit the city. At CarGo, Homer interviews to be a road tester of their self-driving car. The company founders see his bad driving record as an asset. He is hired because he can sit for hours doing nothing. His work amounts to enjoying various activities while the self-driving cars road test themselves.

One day after work, Marge arrives to drive Homer home, and they enjoy the free food in the cafeteria. They notice the recreational employee perks go unused because the coders never stop working. To help the coders enjoy themselves, they instigate a foosball tournament, which the founders see as a team-building exercise that invigorates creativity. To increase employee satisfaction, they make him and Marge a team to boost morale. When Marge and Homer talk employees into trying the company's ice hockey rink, Homer videophones the activity to Lenny and Carl. As a result, the workers at the power plant quit to work for CarGo. In response, Burns and Smithers work undercover at CarGo, where Burns commends the success of providing excellent employee motivation.

Meanwhile, Marge and Homer head home in a CarGo car but realize it listens to their conversations and takes them to places they talk about. They report the problem but are told it is part of CarGo's program to sell users' data to corporations. Horrified at the unethical manipulation, Homer vows to stop them.

Homer, Burns and Smithers team up to stop the cars. With their credentials, they breach the server room where Smithers works to reconfigure the deep neural network and disable the cars' fuel cells, but Marge confronts them. After pleading with Homer not to destroy the fun she is having, she goes to report the situation, but notices CarGo's next phase to use the cars' keychain fob to eavesdrop everywhere they go. Appalled, Marge helps Smithers shut down the cars, and CarGo is bankrupted. Homer asks Burns to hire him and Marge to work together at the plant, but Burns refuses and angrily begins to remember why he fired Homer until Marge shoots him in the head with a Nerf dart, causing him to forget.

Later, the CarGo founders announce a new way to reach consumers: multilingual talking tattoos.

== Production ==
Tracy Morgan was cast for two episodes for this season. He previously played himself in "My Way or the Highway to Heaven". In this episode, he plays a tow truck driver who encounters Homer and Marge.

== Cultural references ==
The title is a reference to the Beatles song "Drive My Car"

During the scene where Homer drives recklessly while eating his food, he sings a parody of Jim Croce's "Operator (That's Not the Way It Feels)" about the meal. He also sings another parody of the song during the montage of him test-driving his CarGo vehicle. The scene where Homer binges on the free food at CarGo is framed against an instrumental of "Pure Imagination" from the 1971 film Willy Wonka & the Chocolate Factory.

The Fabergé chicken that Burns shows Smithers is based on the eggs of the same name.

The CarGo logo has the same color scheme as Argo AI's logo.

== Reception ==
Tony Sokol of Den of Geek gave the episode 4 out of 5 points ranking, stating the episode is "maybe the closest to a classic 'The Simpsons' have offered in a long time. It is purely episodic. The subtle tweaks at the ruling class are timely, and the struggles at the center of it are universal. It's all about jobs. It's the economy, stupid. 'Baby You Can't Drive My Car' works specifically because the workplace is what we all have in common. Left, right and center, we all line up to earn a paycheck. We all want the perfect job. Many people have to drive to work, so we want the perfect car. Whether we like smoothies or not, we could all agree it would be fun to be able to make them while driving. In a driverless car society, the only thing to worry about is real drivers. This reviewer would like to know what the DWI laws will be, because a lot of cars ride on ethanol and, having drunk ethanol on the advice of Moe the bartender, it can be quite impairing."

Dennis Perkins of The A.V. Club gave the episode a B−, stating that "Homer is the one who gets up in arms about the data-mining, while Marge, swept up in all the good their joint venture is having on their marriage, at first decides that a company secretly stealing every scrap of Spiringfielders’ personal information is an insignificant price to pay. 'I can’t be the ethical one!' protests Homer at one point, and, well, he’s got a point. It’s sweet to see Marge and Homer dancing a graceful waltz in a virtual reality ballroom, and Marge’s anguished excuse that 'we were having so much fun!' is pretty heartbreaking when you think about it. But the conflict just doesn’t land, and when Marge (horrified that CarGo plans to extend the listening-in to the cars’ key fob—even in the powder room) finally decides to help Smithers, Burns, and Homer’s sabotage, it’s too thin a motivation."

Michael Vargas of The Game of Nerds liked the commentary of self-driving cars and the concept of computers listening to conversations. He liked the jokes but did not find it "laugh out loud funny."

Screen Rant named this episode as the best one of the thirtieth season.

"Baby You Can't Drive My Car" scored a 1.9 rating with a 7 share and was watched by 5.08 million people, making The Simpsons Fox's highest rated show of the night.
