= Carmen González =

Carmen González may refer to:

- Carmen González (singer), Afro-Ecuadorian singer
- Carmen González (chef), Puerto Rican chef
