= Karamba =

Karamba may refer to:

- Karamba!, a studio album by Bosnian rock band Zabranjeno Pušenje
- Karamba Diaby (born 1961), a Senegalese-German chemist and politician
- Karamba Gassama (born 2005), Gambian footballer
- Karamba Janneh (born 1989), Gambian footballer

== See also ==
- Caramba (disambiguation)
