= The Girl on the Bus =

- The Simpsons episode
- Episode no.: Season 30; Episode 12
- Directed by: Chris Clements
- Written by: Joel H. Cohen
- Production code: YABF04
- Original air date: January 13, 2019

Guest appearances
- Terry Gross as herself; Patti LuPone as Cheryl Monroe

Episode features
- Couch gag: Thanos sits on the couch and uses the Infinity Gauntlet to disintegrate all of the Simpsons except Maggie.

Episode chronology
| ← Previous "Mad About the Toy" | Next → "I'm Dancing as Fat as I Can" |
- The Simpsons season 30

"The Girl on the Bus" is the twelfth episode of the thirtieth season of the American animated television series The Simpsons, and the 651st episode overall. The episode was directed by Chris Clements and written by Joel H. Cohen. It aired in the United States on Fox on January 13, 2019.

In this episode, Lisa befriends a girl she sees from the school bus but lies about her parents when she meets the girl's sophisticated parents. Patti LuPone guest starred as Cheryl Monroe. The episode received negative reviews.

== Plot ==
Channel 6 news opens up with the city's history of the founding and development of Springfield, which leads to the run down school bus Lisa and Bart ride to school every day. On the bus, Lisa wishes she had a close friend, then notices a girl sitting on her front porch playing a clarinet. The next day, Lisa asks Otto Mann to stop the bus, and he drops her off. Exploring the Springfield Heights neighborhood, she finds the girl's house and notices her crying through a window. Lisa introduces herself to the girl, whose name is Sam, and finds that they have much in common.

Sam's parents invite Lisa over to dinner, then ask her about her family. Wanting to not reveal her embarrassing family, Lisa lies about them, saying that Homer is a sculptor, Marge is a chemist, Maggie is a precocious professor, and Bart does not exist. Sam's parents want to meet Lisa's parents, but then reveal that they are moving. When Sam's father drops Lisa off, she tells Ned Flanders to pretend that he is her dad. Eventually, Sam's family announces they are not moving, so Lisa then lies that her parents are going to Lithuania, not wanting her lies to be exposed. She then begins a short double life with Sam's family and her own. After a while, Marge catches her. Marge forces Lisa to invite Sam's family over to dinner and tells Homer to be on his best behavior.

At the dinner table, Homer uses the lines Marge gave him to talk, but then when Sam's father asks Homer about his life, Lisa finally admits she lied about her family. Sam's father admits to lying as well; he previously stated that he was from Nigeria, but he is actually from Cameroon. Noticing the sudden awkwardness, Bart invites everyone to hang out in his redecorated room, which he worked on secretly while everyone was focused on Lisa, who is ecstatic to have her story have a happy ending.

Over time, Bart's room becomes a hit, and he invites everyone to his room to use as a hang-out except his own parents, who are worried the situation is getting out of hand. Bart's appointed bouncer Nelson Muntz does let in Marge, who promises Homer she will talk to Bart.

== Production ==
In July 2018 at San Diego Comic-Con, the producers announced that Patti LuPone would guest star as Sam's mother.

== Cultural references ==
Homer texts Lisa the internet meme of himself backing into a bush. The meme originated from the season 5 episode "Homer Loves Flanders".

== Reception ==
=== Viewing figures ===
Leading out of the NFL divisional round game on Fox, the episode earned a 3.2 rating with a 12 share and was watched by 8.2 million viewers.

=== Critical response ===
Dennis Perkins from The A.V. Club gave the episode a D+ ranking, stating "Lisa’s a tough character to write for. Not because her smarts make her better than everyone else, but because her awareness of her world’s absurdities can’t shield her from being, irrevocably, part of it. So again—degree of comedic difficulty noted. But this is The Simpsons. And say what you want about the good old days, but when there’s a legacy of writing great Lisa stories and you botch one this badly, the failure is that much more glaring."

Tony Sokol from Den of Geek gave the episode 3.5 out of 5 points ranking, stating "'The Girl on the Bus' gets caught in crosstown traffic by the ending. While we always know the family is going to work things out, lately things have been working out too well for the Simpsons. The comfort of the smooth animation now couches comfier endings. There is no additional twist to the loving outpouring. It is a feel-good episode that should have felt a little bad. Lisa learns how exciting it is to deceive all the people she loves, but she can't sustain her enthusiasm."
