= My Way or the Highway to Heaven =

- The Simpsons episode
- Episode no.: Season 30; Episode 3
- Directed by: Rob Oliver
- Written by: Deb Lacusta; Dan Castellaneta; Vince Waldron
- Production code: XABF17
- Original air date: October 14, 2018

Guest appearances
- H. Jon Benjamin as Bob Belcher; Jon Lovitz as himself; Dan Mintz as Tina Belcher; Eugene Mirman as Gene Belcher; Tracy Morgan as himself; John Roberts as Linda Belcher; Kristen Schaal as Louise Belcher

Episode features
- Couch gag: Homer finds himself in Bob's Burgers during that show's opening sequence. The Belchers look inside the restaurant at Homer.

Episode chronology
← Previous "Heartbreak Hotel"	Next → "Treehouse of Horror XXIX"
- The Simpsons season 30

"My Way or the Highway to Heaven" is the 642nd episode of the American animated television series The Simpsons and the third episode of the thirtieth season. It aired in the United States on Fox on October 14, 2018. The episode was directed by Rob Oliver and written by Deb Lacusta, Dan Castellaneta, and Vince Waldron.

In this episode, Ned tells the story of him saving a young Homer, Marge tells the story of her grandmother fighting Nazis, and Lisa tells the story of a female version of the Buddha. H. Jon Benjamin, Dan Mintz, Eugene Mirman, John Roberts, and Kristen Schaal guest starred as their characters from the television series Bob's Burgers. Actors Jon Lovitz and Tracy Morgan appeared as themselves. The episode received positive reviews.

== Plot ==
God and Saint Peter discuss relaxing their admissions requirements to address the lack of people in heaven. They watch Flanders lead a Sunday school class. Ned says the only way to heaven is to "never stray from the path of righteousness." He recalls his non-religious upbringing and his job as a trampoline salesman. Ned is discouraged until the televised moonwalks of Apollo 14 astronauts increases sales but learns the trampolines build static electricity with each bounce and kill the users when it is released on the 500th bounce. Ned rushes to save a young Homer, who intends to surpass the 500-bounce record. He pushes Homer out of the way and is electrocuted. He appears before Jesus who offers him the chance to live if he becomes a Christian. He awakens reborn with a permanent scar hidden by his mustache.

St. Peter suggests God consider atheists who are also righteous. In the class, Marge talks about her atheist grandmother, Genevieve, who lived in Nazi-occupied France during World War II. She co-manages a cafe with her husband Meaux, a Nazi-collaborator. While Meaux flatters Nazi officers, Genevieve discovers American paratroopers whom she disguises as waitstaff. When one of the Americans mistakenly reveals the plan for the Normandy landings, they stop the Nazis from warning others by singing "La Marseillaise", which prompts the cafe patrons to block the Nazis' exit. When the Nazi commandant attempts to kidnap Genevieve, she kills him, and Meaux and the paratroopers help her kill the Nazis. The paratroopers escape, and Genevieve and Meaux reconcile, proving atheists can also do great things. God agrees to opening heaven to atheists.

God and St. Peter are visited by Buddha, who suggests they open heaven to other faiths. In the class, Lisa says that besides redemption and good works, there is the way of enlightenment. She talks about a spoiled princess who lived in Nepal during the 6th century B.C. named Siddmartha, a female version of Siddhārtha. She is dissatisfied despite being denied nothing. She seeks a middle path between opulence and decadence and ventures out of the palace disguised as a poor boy. Lacking ideas, she sits under the Bodhi tree until she is enlightened. God agrees to admit all good souls, and heaven is filled again.

On Earth, Flanders tells his sons that thunder is angels bowling. St. Peter accidentally drops a tenpin on their house, which they consider a blessing.

== Production ==
The cast of the television series Bob's Burgers reprise their roles as the Belcher family in the couch gag.

Tracy Morgan was cast for two episodes for this season. In this episode, he plays himself as an angel in heaven as a nod to his 2014 car accident, which left him in a coma for two weeks. He later played a tow truck driver in "Baby You Can't Drive My Car". A photo of him in this episode was released in July 2018.

== Reception ==
Dennis Perkins of The A.V. Club gave the episode a B− stating, "The episode takes the form of a sort of religion-based Treehouse of Horror, with three stories (told by Ned, Marge, and Lisa, respectively) that test out the new criteria by which God will choose who deserves to hang out for all eternity in the show's traditionally cloudy and harp-strewn paradise. Written by marrieds Dan Castellaneta and Deb Lacusta, along with first-time Simpsons writer Vince Waldron, the result is a decidedly low-stakes outing that, nonetheless, isn't without its charms."

Tony Sokol of Den of Geek gave the episode 4.5 out of 5 points ranking stating, "The Simpsons may not preach against evolution, but they have evolved from the kind of show that was uproariously laugh out loud to evoking us to say, oh, clever. The series will always be a little intellectual, as it is a constant battle between the selfless wisdom of Marge and Lisa and the chaotic buffoonery of Bart and Homer. Where were Bart and Homer, by the way? We get a story from Ned in place of a family member? Could it be it wouldn't matter what they brought as an offering it would send the whole town of Springfield straight to hell? "My Way or the Highway to Heaven" should have let the boy and his Homer offer their own dark alternative. The episode is tinted too bright."

Jesse Bereta of Bubbleblabber gave the episode an 8 out of 10. He thought the scenes with God and St. Peter to be "the most clever part of the episode" and liked the change in format. He wanted to see more classic jokes such as Bart's prank call to Moe in the second story.

"My Way or the Highway to Heaven" scored a 1.0 rating with a 5 share and was watched by 2.52 million people, making The Simpsons Fox's highest rated show of the night.
