= The Simpsons season 30 =

Season of television series

The Simpsons
- Season 30
- Digital purchase image featuring retired character Troy McClure
- Showrunners: Matt Selman (4 episodes); Al Jean
- No. of episodes: 23

Release
- Original network: Fox
- Original release: September 30, 2018 – May 12, 2019

Season chronology
- ← Previous; Season 29 Next → Season 31

The thirtieth season of the American animated sitcom The Simpsons aired on Fox between September 30, 2018, and May 12, 2019. The season was produced by Gracie Films and 20th Century Fox Television. Al Jean returns as showrunner, a position he has held since the thirteenth season. Matt Selman also contributed as showrunner for the episodes "Heartbreak Hotel", "Krusty the Clown", "The Clown Stays in the Picture" and "Bart vs. Itchy & Scratchy". The series hit a milestone 650th episode on January 6, 2019, with the episode "Mad About the Toy", and the season also saw both the renewal of the series for two additional seasons on February 6, and the acquisition of the majority of 21st Century Fox's assets (which includes the show itself) by Disney on March 20.

The season received positive reviews. The episode "Mad About the Toy" won the Primetime Emmy Award for Outstanding Animated Program and Hank Azaria was nominated for the Primetime Emmy Award for Outstanding Character Voice-Over Performance. Two writers were nominated for Writers Guild of America Awards with Stephanie Gillis winning the Writers Guild of America Award for Television: Animation.

== Episodes ==
No. overall	No. in season	Title	Directed by	Written by	Original release date	Prod. code	U.S. viewers (millions)
640	1	"Bart's Not Dead"	Bob Anderson	Stephanie Gillis	September 30, 2018	XABF19	3.24
Bart refuses a dare to interrupt Lisa's saxophone performance at school, which makes Marge proud. Later, he takes part in a dare, which ends with him in a hospital. To avoid disappointing Marge, Bart makes a claim that he saw Heaven. Christian producers want to make a movie about his experience with help from Homer and Ned, but he starts to feel guilty. Bart confesses to Marge that he lied, but the movie is successful. At a press conference, the lie is revealed, and Homer and Ned pledge to give the profits to charity. Lisa comforts Bart on the roof at home. They fall off and land on a pile of leaves, which they call a miracle. Guest stars: Dave Attell as Luke, Emily Deschanel as herself playing Marge, Gal Gadot as herself playing Lisa, Jonathan Groff as Actor playing Bart and Pete Holmes as Matthew
641	2	"Heartbreak Hotel"	Steven Dean Moore	Renee Ridgeley & Matt Selman	October 7, 2018	XABF15	4.60
Marge and Homer are selected to compete on her favorite reality competition show. They lose the first challenge and are eliminated, but cannot go home until filming is completed. Waiting in the hotel, Marge is angered when she discovers that Homer caused them to lose. Later, Marge flirts with Nick, a man from another eliminated couple. It is announced that the eliminated contestants can return to the competition for the final round if they partner with someone else. Marge chooses to reenter with Nick, but she causes them to lose. Returning home, Marge apologizes to Homer, and he forgives her because people are pitying him instead of her for once. Guest stars: Joe Clabby as Curtis, Rhys Darby as Tag Tuckerbag, Renee Ridgeley as Honey and George Segal as Nick
642	3	"My Way or the Highway to Heaven"	Rob Oliver	Dan Castellaneta, Deb Lacusta & Vince Waldron	October 14, 2018	XABF17	2.52
In Sunday School, Ned tells the story of when he was a trampoline salesman. He learns that each bounce builds static electricity until electrocution occurs. When he learns that a young Homer is trying to set a record number of bounces, Ned stops him and is electrocuted. He has a vision of heaven and vows to be a Christian. Marge tells the story of her grandmother who worked in a café in Nazi-occupied France. While serving Nazis, she hides the American soldiers in the cellar. When they are discovered, she kills the Nazis to help the soldiers escape. Lisa tells the story of a female version of the Buddha. A princess who is dissatisfied despite having everything, she explores the world looking for a better way until she finds enlightenment. Guest stars: H. Jon Benjamin as Bob Belcher, Jon Lovitz as himself, Dan Mintz as Tina Belcher, Eugene Mirman as Gene Belcher, Tracy Morgan as himself, John Roberts as Linda Belcher and Kristen Schaal as Louise Belcher
643	4	"Treehouse of Horror XXIX"	Matthew Faughnan	Joel H. Cohen	October 21, 2018	XABF16	2.95
In the twenty-ninth annual Simpsons Halloween special: "Intrusion of the Pod-y Switchers": The townsfolk buy a new version of a smart phone created by a plant alien. Distracted, they do not notice when the alien's planet sends spores that replace everyone with plant versions of themselves. The originals wake up on the alien planet where they continue to use smart phones.; "Multiplisa-ty": Lisa, suffering from dissociative identity disorder, begins killing Bart's friends. To prevent himself from being killed, Bart says he loves her, and she returns to normal.; "Geriatric Park": Mr. Burns opens a retirement home that helps the elderly feel better by mixing their DNA with dinosaur DNA. However, when Homer raises the temperature in Grampa's room, they turn into dinosaurs. Burns is killed, and the Simpson family escapes from the elderly.
644	5	"Baby You Can't Drive My Car"	Timothy Bailey	Rob LaZebnik	November 4, 2018	XABF18	5.08
When Homer accidentally crashes his car into Mr. Burns' window, he is fired and gets a job at a self-driving car company. When Marge visits and uses the company's fringe benefits to help the engineers have fun, he and Marge are assigned to help with worker morale. The power plant workers leave to work at the company, so Burns and Smithers go undercover there. Homer and Marge discover that the cars are spying on people to sell their data. They team up with Burns and Smithers to sabotage the cars, and the company goes bankrupt. Guest star: Tracy Morgan as Tow Truck Driver
645	6	"From Russia Without Love"	Matthew Nastuk	Michael Ferris	November 11, 2018	XABF20	2.35
Following a failed prank phone call, Bart, Nelson and Milhouse get Moe a mail-order Russian bride named Anastasia on the dark web. Moe allows her to stay, but he refuses to fall in love with her. Anastasia takes a job in another town. When Homer discovers what Bart did, he tells Moe, who confesses his feelings to Anastasia with Homer's encouragement. Bart translates the mail-order bride contract, which says that Anastasia will get all of Moe's property upon marriage. When Anastasia is exposed, she reveals that she is an American scammer, so Moe forces her to leave. Guest stars: Jon Lovitz as Hacky/Snitchy the Weasel and Ksenia Solo as Anastasia Alekova
646	7	"Werking Mom"	Mike Frank Polcino	Carolyn Omine & Robin Sayers	November 18, 2018	XABF21	4.34
Marge is trying to sell plastic containers for money, and Julio agrees to host a party for it. Because she is nervous, Julio gives her a makeover. Marge is successful, but Julio says it is because his gay friends thought she was a drag queen. She continues the ruse until Homer finds out and reveals her true self. Marge is angered, so Homer decides to appear in drag at a club to impress Marge. Meanwhile, Lisa feels good after returning a hidden box that belonged to Jasper when he was a child. She chooses to anonymously bring joy to other sad Springfield residents. When they realize it was Lisa, she becomes ashamed. They bring her to the school's roof to have lunch to thank her. Guest stars: Raja Gemini as themself, RuPaul as Queen Chante and Scott Thompson as Grady
647	8	"Krusty the Clown"	Matthew Faughnan	Ryan Koh	November 25, 2018	XABF22	2.11
Lisa is demoted to television show recapper at the school newspaper, so she gives the job to Homer. He does well, but a bad review of Krusty's show causes Krusty to attack him. To protect Krusty from the police, Bart sends him to a circus to be with other clowns. He enjoys it until it runs out of money. To help the circus, he tells the clowns turn him in to the police for the reward money. Meanwhile, Homer quits being a recapper because he spent so much time watching television that it was ruining his marriage. However, a television executive wants him to continue. He reveals that most shows do not exist, but recappers are needed for the fake shows so people continue to subscribe to their television services. Homer recaps the encounter and exposes him. Later, Krusty is acquitted for attacking Homer because the jury dislikes him. Guest stars: Billy Eichner as Billy and Peter Serafinowicz as Corporate CEO
648	9	"Daddicus Finch"	Steven Dean Moore	Al Jean	December 2, 2018	YABF01	4.33
When Lisa is cut from the school play, Homer takes her shopping to cheer her up. When he complains about the fashion for young girls, Lisa starts to view him as her hero, and they spend more time together. Jealous, the school therapist tells Bart to behave badly for attention. He causes chaos at a party, and a mob tries to attack Bart. Homer is able to calm them down. Later, Lisa and Bart fight when he insults Homer. Marge thinks Lisa's new attitude about Homer is hurting the family. Homer tells Lisa not to revere him, and she agrees. He is saddened, but Maggie comforts him. Guest stars: Jon Lovitz as Llewellyn Sinclair and Rabbi and J. K. Simmons as Dr. Jessup Note: This episode was dedicated to Ricky Jay.
649	10	"'Tis the 30th Season"	Lance Kramer	Story by : Jeff Westbrook; Teleplay by : John Frink & Joel H. Cohen	December 9, 2018	YABF02	7.53
Marge fails to buy a smart television the family wants the day after Thanksgiving. She becomes stressed as Christmas approaches, so the family surprises her with a vacation to Florida. However, they booked an extremely small motel room, but Homer tells Bart and Lisa to pretend to be happy. The children complain to the manager, who ignores them, so Bart pranks her. Admitting the vacation is not enjoyable, they drive home but run out of fuel outside Springfield. They walk into town and find Moe hosting a dinner for the poor. They join him and appreciate each other. Later, the manager refunds their money and gives extra so that they never return. They use the money to buy a smart television. Guest star: Jane Lynch as Jeanie
650	11	"Mad About the Toy"	Rob Oliver	Michael Price	January 6, 2019	YABF03	2.33
After Bart finds plastic soldier toys in the basement, Grampa has a panic attack. Lisa notices that the toy soldiers look like Grampa. He remembers that he was a model for the toys in the 1940s and was supposed to be paid a royalty. When the story becomes national news, he is invited to the toy company in New York. He remembers that the male photographer tried to kiss him, and he ran away before collect his money. The company then fired the photographer for being gay. He realizes that he may have ruined the photographer's life. Lisa tracks him down in Texas, so the Simpsons visit his gallery. They find him with paintings of Grampa in uniform. He thanks Grampa for making him realize that he should always be the way he truly is. Guest stars: Bryan Batt as Philip Hefflin, Bill de Blasio as himself and Lawrence O'Donnell as himself
651	12	"The Girl on the Bus"	Chris Clements	Joel H. Cohen	January 13, 2019	YABF04	8.20
While on the school bus, Lisa sees a girl playing a clarinet on a porch. She exits the bus and finds the girl who is named Sam. Her parents invite Lisa to dinner. Embarrassed by her family, Lisa lies that her parents have sophisticated jobs. She maintains the lie until Marge realizes what was happening. She tells Lisa to invite Sam's family to dinner, and Marge and Homer try to help Lisa maintain her lie. However, she is exposed and feels ashamed. Sam's father admits that he lied about his country of origin. To avoid the awkwardness, Bart invites everyone to a party in his renovated bedroom, which was done while everybody was focused on Lisa. Guest stars: Terry Gross as herself and Patti LuPone as Cheryl Monroe
652	13	"I'm Dancing as Fat as I Can"	Matthew Nastuk	Jane Becker	February 10, 2019	YABF06	1.75
Marge needs to visit a relative out of town, so she makes Homer promise not to watch a new season of a streaming television show. He tries to avoid temptation, but he gives in, and Marge catches him watching the end of the season as she returns home. Looking for forgiveness, Homer knows that Marge also likes watching dance shows, so he takes dance lessons. He invites Marge to a ballroom where they dance, and she forgives him. Meanwhile, Bart enters an essay contest to win a shopping cart full of Krusty toy store merchandise. He is named a finalist along with Milhouse and Ralph. They must race through the store, and the first one to cross the finish line will keep their toys. Near the finish line, Bart and Milhouse crash, and Ralph takes their carts and wins. Guest star: Ted Sarandos as himself
653	14	"The Clown Stays in the Picture"	Timothy Bailey	Matt Selman	February 17, 2019	YABF05	2.75
A young Krusty is making his directorial debut. He is adopting a science fiction novel as a feature film in Mexico and hires the townsfolk, including young Homer and Marge, as the film crew. Marge becomes assistant director, and he gives Homer dangerous jobs to keep him from distracting Marge. Homer is sent to find a lizard in a sandstorm and gets lost. He is captured by a gang, but Krusty refuses to pay the ransom. Marge decides to trade the film for Homer. With the film a failure, Krusty is forced to become a television clown. Guest star: Marc Maron as himself Note: This episode was dedicated to series production manager Trista H. Navarro.
654	15	"101 Mitigations"	Mark Kirkland	Story by : Rob LaZebnik; Teleplay by : Brian Kelley & Dan Vebber	March 3, 2019	YABF07	2.25
After eating in a restaurant, a parking valet accidentally gives Homer a classic car belonging to Comic Book Guy. After driving and returning it, he is accused of stealing the car and damaging the comic book in the car. He is arrested and found guilty. The Simpson family films a mitigation video to garner sympathy with the judge before sentencing. However, Comic Book Guy also gives a convincing speech. When Homer tries to reason with him, he notices that Homer has a rare keychain that Grampa gave him. To make Homer feel how he feels, he destroys the keychain and agrees to drop the charges. Guest star: Guillermo del Toro as himself
655	16	"I Want You (She's So Heavy)"	Steven Dean Moore	Jeff Westbrook	March 10, 2019	YABF08	2.21
Homer and Marge sneak into a wedding expo and enjoy being together. Still feeling romantic at home, he carries her up the stairs, but he falls, resulting in a hernia for Homer and an ankle injury for Marge. Homer's pain medication gives him hallucinations and makes him lazier while Marge's physical therapist helps her recover and later teaches her kite-surfing. Worried for their marriage, Lisa gets Homer to drive them to the beach. Seeing Marge kite-surfing, Homer decides to join her, but the wind blows them away, resulting in new injuries. Meanwhile, the therapist is arrested and is revealed to be a spy trying to learn about the power plant from Homer. Guest star: Wallace Shawn as Wallace the Hernia
656	17	"E My Sports"	Rob Oliver	Rob LaZebnik	March 17, 2019	YABF09	2.08
After Homer gets him a new gaming computer, Bart begins to excel at eSports. When Bart's team has a chance to win $500,000 in a gaming tournament in Seoul, Homer decides to coach his son's team. They advance to the final round in Seoul. Lisa, disappointed that they are going to South Korea without her, convinces Marge to make it a family trip. Once there, the family visits a Buddhist temple where Homer learns to let go of material gain. In this state, he sabotages the tournament, which causes the team to lose. On the way home, Bart is attacked by his teammates due to Homer's actions. Guest stars: Ken Jeong as Korean Monks, Natasha Lyonne as Sophie and David Turley as Conflict of Enemies Commentator
657	18	"Bart vs. Itchy & Scratchy"	Chris Clements	Megan Amram	March 24, 2019	YABF10	1.99
Bart decides to protest with his friends after Krusty announces the debut of an all-female reboot of The Itchy & Scratchy Show. However, Bart gets caught watching and liking the show. To avoid being attacked at school by the boys, he hides in the girls' bathroom where he meets sixth-grade girls who carry out pranks. Meanwhile, Milhouse becomes leader of a boys' rights group. The boys force Krusty to end the female reboot. Lisa learns that Bart is performing pranks with the girls. They decide to destroy the Itchy & Scratchy tapes against Bart's wishes. At the studio, as they prepare to drop the tapes into a tub of nail polish remover, Bart distracts them while Lisa knocks away the tub. The chemicals from the spilled tub causes the boys in the studio audience to cry, and they blame Milhouse. Bart leaves the girls, but Lisa decides to join the girls. Guest stars: Awkwafina as Carmen, Nicole Byer as Erica and Chelsea Peretti as Piper
658	19	"Girl's in the Band"	Jennifer Moeller	Nancy Cartwright	March 31, 2019	YABF11	2.07
When the director of the Capitol City Philharmonic visits, Dewey Largo tries to impress him as a conductor, but he selects Lisa for his youth orchestra instead. Lisa has a difficult time under his harsh training. Meanwhile, Homer works extra shifts at the plant to pay for Lisa's training. Lisa wins the competition for first chair, but notices the toll it takes on her family. She is offered a spot in the next-level class that is more expensive and farther away, but she purposely fails the audition so that her family does not have to endure more hardship. Guest stars: Dave Matthews as Lloyd the Bartender and J. K. Simmons as Victor Kleskow
659	20	"I'm Just a Girl Who Can't Say D'oh"	Mike Frank Polcino	Jeff Martin & Jenna Martin	April 7, 2019	YABF12	1.61
Marge decides to direct a musical written by Lisa about Jebediah Springfield. Krusty plans to air the musical live on television. Sideshow Mel is selected for the main role. However, just days before the play is set to air, Mel leaves for a role in another play. She selects Professor Frink to replace him. During the play, it begins to rain, threatening to ruin the production. Lisa quickly rewrites the script, and the production is successful. Later, at an awards ceremony, Sideshow Mel wins for Outstanding Lead Performance, while Marge's play wins nothing despite ten nominations. However, Marge is selected as Best Newcomer. Meanwhile, Homer and Maggie join a popular baby class run by a beautiful instructor. However, it ends when one of the fathers marries her. Guest stars: Okilly Dokilly as themselves, Josh Groban as Professor Frink's singing voice, John Lithgow as himself and Jon Lovitz as Llewellyn Sinclair
660	21	"D'oh Canada"	Matthew Nastuk	Tim Long & Miranda Thompson	April 28, 2019	YABF14	1.93
The family takes a trip to Niagara Falls to redeem some hotel rewards they earned. Lisa falls down Niagara Falls while fighting with Bart and ends up on the Canadian side. While in the hospital, she complains about America and is declared a refugee. She enjoys living in Canada while Marge sneaks into Canada to retrieve her. At the American consulate, they are denied re-entry into the United States, which delights Lisa. However, after Lisa has a vision about the good things about America, they sneak back into America by crossing a frozen river. Guest stars: Awkwafina as Dr. Chang, Judy Blume as herself and Lucas Meyer as Justin Trudeau
661	22	"Woo-Hoo Dunnit?"	Steven Dean Moore	Brian Kelley	May 5, 2019	YABF15	1.79
When Lisa's college fund, hidden in a can under the kitchen sink, gets stolen, the family tries to find out who stole it. Homer is suspected of using it to pay for his bar tab, but it is proven that he did not use the money. Bart is caught taking money from it but proves that he was always able to refund what was borrowed. Lisa is accused of buying a new saxophone, but it is proven that she did not buy one. Homer deduces that Marge used the money to start a drink coaster business. However, after Marge talks about all of Homer's past schemes, he lies to the children and says rats ate it after Grampa left the can open. Guest stars: Ken Burns as himself playing Homer, Will Forte as King Toot, Jackie Mason as Rabbi Krustofsky and Liev Schreiber as "Dateline Springfield" Narrator
662	23	"Crystal Blue-Haired Persuasion"	Matthew Faughnan	Megan Amram	May 12, 2019	YABF16	1.50
Mr. Burns cuts health care benefits for his employees, so Marge buys healing crystals for Bart for his attention deficit hyperactivity disorder. When Bart gets good grades, Marge takes over the crystal shop to sell crystals to others. Lisa is suspicious of the crystals while Marge gains a rival crystal business owner. Lisa finds that Bart hid notes in the classroom that can only be seen with a crystal. She forces Bart to admit what he did to Marge, who is confronted with angry customers with crystals that did nothing. She closes her shop and lets her rival win. Guest stars: Illeana Douglas as the New Age Clerk, Werner Herzog as Walter Hotenhoffer and Jenny Slate as Piper Paisley

== Voice cast & characters ==
=== Main cast ===
- Dan Castellaneta as Homer Simpson, Grampa Simpson, Barney Gumble, Blue-Haired Lawyer, Grizzly Shawn, Sideshow Mel, Gil Gunderson, Groundskeeper Willie, Hans Moleman, Squeaky-Voiced Teen, Mayor Quimby, Krusty the Clown, Benjamin, Smitty, Itchy, Mr. Teeny, The Leprechaun and various others
- Julie Kavner as Marge Simpson, Patty Bouvier, Selma Bouvier, Eunice Bouvier, Jacqueline Bouvier and various others
- Nancy Cartwright as Bart Simpson, Maggie Simpson, Kearney Zzyzwicz, Ralph Wiggum, Nelson Muntz, Todd Flanders and various others
- Yeardley Smith as Lisa Simpson
- Hank Azaria as Superintendent Chalmers, Chief Wiggum, Kirk Van Houten, Moe Szyslak, Professor Frink, Carl Carlson, Comic Book Guy, Officer Lou, Duffman, Old Jewish Man, Doug, Raphael, Cletus Spuckler, Julio, Luigi Risotto, Coach Krupt, Dr. Nick Riviera, Bumblebee Man, Captain McCallister, Disco Stu and various others
- Harry Shearer as Principal Skinner, Ned Flanders, Lenny Leonard, Dr. Hibbert, Reverend Lovejoy, Kent Brockman, Clancy Bouvier, God, Nedward Flanders, Sr., Rainier Wolfcastle, Mr. Burns, Waylon Smithers, Gary, Herman Hermann, Eddie Muntz, Jasper Beardsley, Dewey (Mr. Largo's ex-boyfriend), Dewey Largo, Scratchy, Judge Snyder, Otto Mann, Geoffrey and various others

=== Supporting cast ===
- Pamela Hayden as Milhouse Van Houten, Jimbo Jones, Rod Flanders and various others
- Tress MacNeille as Dolph Shapiro, Mrs. Muntz, Agnes Skinner, Shauna Chalmers, Amazon Alexa, Lindsey Naegle, Laney Fontaine, Lunchlady Dora, Mama Risotto, Brandine Spuckler and various others
- Chris Edgerly as The Detonator and various others
- Kevin Michael Richardson as Anger Watkins, Louis Armstrong and various others
- Maggie Roswell as Miss Hoover, Helen Lovejoy, Luann Van Houten and various others
- Russi Taylor as Martin Prince, Sherri and Terri and various others

The season features guest appearances from Dave Attel, Emily Deschanel, Gal Gadot, Jonathan Groff, Pete Holmes, Rhys Darby, Tracy Morgan, RuPaul, Bryan Batt, Lawrence O'Donnell, Patti LuPone, Marc Maron, Guillermo del Toro, Wallace Shawn, Awkwafina, Chelsea Peretti, Nicole Byer, Ken Jeong, John Lithgow, Liev Schreiber, Illeana Douglas and Jenny Slate. The episode "Heartbreak Hotel" saw George Segal reprising the role of Nick from Who's Afraid of Virginia Woolf? that he had originally played 52 years earlier, musician Josh Groban provides the singing voice for longtime character Professor Frink, musician Dave Matthews gives voice to Lloyd the bartender from The Shining and the five main cast members of Bob's Burgers also reprised their roles for a crossover couch gag in the episode "My Way or the Highway to Heaven". Several prior guest stars returned this season, including longtime recurring guest star Jon Lovitz in various roles, two stints from actor J. K. Simmons to make his 4th and 5th appearances in the series, Scott Thompson returning for his fourth time as Grady, comedian Jackie Mason reprising his role as Rabbi Krustofsky once more, and Terry Gross and Ken Burns appearing as themselves. Natasha Lyonne, Will Forte and Werner Herzog all returned to roles they had previously performed once before playing Sophie Krustofsky, King Toot and Walter Hotenhoffer respectively.

== Production ==
This season and the previous season were ordered in November 2016. Eight episodes were holdovers from the previous season. Executive producer Al Jean continued his role as primary showrunner, a role he had since the thirteenth season. Executive producer Matt Selman was also the showrunner for several episodes, a role he performed since the twenty-third season. Commenting on the show's longevity in its thirtieth season, Jean stated the show continued to perform well in the television ratings and continued to win awards, so he saw no reason for the need for the show to end.

This season features the first episode written by voice actor Nancy Cartwright with the episode "Girl's in the Band", making her the third of the six main cast members to have an episode to their name after Dan Castellaneta, who had co-written scripts since season 11 and Harry Shearer, who wrote the season 28 episode "Trust but Clarify". It also features the first episodes written by Megan Amram. In total, the season featured ten episodes written or co-written by women. For the eSports-themed episode "E My Sports", the show's producers hired League of Legends developers Riot Games as consultants in order to get the eSports referenced in the show as authentic as possible.

The acquisition of 21st Century Fox by Disney was completed during this season. When the acquisition was first announced, it was noted that the show had predicted the event in the tenth season episode "When You Dish Upon a Star". Jean acknowledged the event by posting a drawing on social media of Homer strangling Mickey Mouse while Bart smiles. The following month, Disney posted a video on social media of the Simpson family reluctantly putting on mouse ears. In 2021, Jean stated that the acquisition brought no editorial changes and that the producers were told to "just be yourselves".

=== 30th Anniversary ===
In September 2018, Fox released a 30th anniversary logo for the series featuring a silhouette of Marge and Maggie. The series celebrated its thirtieth anniversary with a 15-hour marathon on the channel FXX starting December 9, 2018 featuring 30 handpicked episodes by showrunner Al Jean. Additionally, "Simpsons Roasting on an Open Fire", the show's first episode, re-aired on Fox on December 23, 2018.

== Reception ==
=== Ratings ===
For the 2018-2019 television season, the season earned a 1.4 rating in the 18-49 demographic, which was the 50th best performing show. It averaged 3.65 million viewers, which was the 126th best performing show.

Viewership and ratings per episode of The Simpsons season 30
No.	Title	Air date	Rating/share (18–49)	Viewers (millions)	DVR (18–49)	DVR viewers (millions)	Total (18–49)	Total viewers (millions)
1	"Bart's Not Dead"	September 30, 2018	1.4/5	3.24	0.3	0.58	1.6	3.83
2	"Heartbreak Hotel"	October 7, 2018	1.8/7	4.60	0.2	0.60	2.0	5.21
3	"My Way or the Highway to Heaven"	October 14, 2018	1.0/5	2.52	0.3	0.55	1.3	3.07
4	"Treehouse of Horror XXIX"	October 21, 2018	1.3/6	2.95	0.3	0.69	1.6	3.65
5	"Baby You Can't Drive My Car"	November 4, 2018	1.9/7	5.08	0.3	0.69	2.2	5.78
6	"From Russia Without Love"	November 11, 2018	0.9/4	2.35	0.3	0.66	1.2	3.01
7	"Werking Mom"	November 18, 2018	1.6/7	4.34	0.3	0.65	1.9	5.00
8	"Krusty the Clown"	November 25, 2018	0.8/3	2.11	0.3	0.58	1.1	2.68
9	"Daddicus Finch"	December 2, 2018	1.6/6	4.33	0.2	0.55	1.8	4.89
10	"Tis the 30th Season"	December 9, 2018	2.8/11	7.53	0.3	0.55	3.1	8.09
11	"Mad About the Toy"	January 6, 2019	0.9/4	2.33	0.2	0.54	1.1	2.87
12	"The Girl on the Bus"	January 13, 2019	3.2/12	8.20	0.2	0.57	3.5	8.78
13	"I'm Dancing as Fat as I Can"	February 10, 2019	0.6/3	1.75	0.2	0.57	0.9	2.33
14	"The Clown Stays in the Picture"	February 17, 2019	0.9/4	2.75	0.3	0.60	1.1	3.35
15	"101 Mitigations"	March 3, 2019	0.8/4	2.25	0.3	0.56	1.1	2.81
16	"I Want You (She's So Heavy)"	March 10, 2019	0.8/4	2.21	0.2	0.49	1.0	2.70
17	"E My Sports"	March 17, 2019	0.8/4	2.08	0.3	0.57	1.0	2.65
18	"Bart vs. Itchy & Scratchy"	March 24, 2019	0.8/4	1.99	0.2	0.47	1.0	2.46
19	"Girl's in the Band"	March 31, 2019	0.8/4	2.07	0.2	0.44	1.0	2.51
20	"I'm Just a Girl Who Can't Say D'oh"	April 7, 2019	0.7/3	1.61	0.2	0.41	0.9	2.02
21	"D'oh Canada"	April 28, 2019	0.8/4	1.93	0.2	0.53	1.0	2.47
22	"Woo-Hoo Dunnit?"	May 5, 2019	0.7/4	1.79	0.2	0.41	0.9	2.20
23	"Crystal Blue-Haired Persuasion"	May 12, 2019	0.5/3	1.50	0.2	0.48	0.8	1.98

=== Critical response ===
Andy Wilson of Bleeding Cool thought the season was successful to satirizing the television industry with episodes focusing on topics such as reality television, gender-swapped characters, and the quality of long-running television series. He also noticed that nearly half the episodes had contributions by female writers.

Jesse Bereta of Bubbleblabber gave the season an 8 out of 10. He highlighted the episodes featuring progressive topics but also noted many episodes featuring same tension in the marriage of Homer and Marge. He also notices that series continues to cast many high-profile guest stars.

=== Controversy ===
The show came under fire for the episode "D'oh Canada" in late April 2019. While the episode mocked American and Canadian heads of government Donald Trump and Justin Trudeau and brought up the SNC-Lavalin affair, the aspects that caused offense were largely related to a parody of Frank Sinatra's song "Theme from New York, New York" where Homer made fun of Upstate New York and for the use of "newfie" in relation to Canadian residents of Newfoundland. In the latter several Canadian children chime "stupid newfies" before a character closely resembling Ralph Wiggum calls himself one and proceeds to beat a baby seal pup plush toy with a club while singing about being a Newfoundlander. Musician Bruce Moss rejected an offer from the show's producers to use his song "The Islander" for the episode, referring to them as "morally bankrupt" and turning down $20,000 US.

=== Accolades ===
On July 16, 2019, it was announced that the show had received two nominations for the 71st Primetime Creative Arts Emmy Awards, with the episode "Mad About the Toy" being nominated for the Primetime Emmy Award for Outstanding Animated Program and cast member Hank Azaria getting a nomination for the Primetime Emmy Award for Outstanding Character Voice-Over Performance for the episode "From Russia Without Love" playing the characters Moe Szyslak, Carl Carlson, Duffman and Kirk Van Houten. The winners were announced on September 14, 2019, at the Creative Arts Emmy Awards ceremony, where "Mad About the Toy" won the show its 11th award in the category, while Hank Azaria lost to Seth MacFarlane for his performances in the animated series Family Guy.

Writer Stephanie Gillis won the Writers Guild of America Award for Outstanding Writing in Animation at the 71st Writers Guild of America Awards for penning the season premiere episode "Bart's Not Dead". Ryan Koh was nominated the same awards for his script for "Krusty the Clown".
