= The Clown Stays in the Picture =

- The Simpsons episode
- Episode no.: Season 30; Episode 14
- Directed by: Timothy Bailey
- Written by: Matt Selman
- Original air date: February 17, 2019

Guest appearance
- Marc Maron as himself

Episode chronology
← Previous "I'm Dancing as Fat as I Can"	Next → "101 Mitigations"
- The Simpsons season 30

"The Clown Stays in the Picture" is the fourteenth episode of the thirtieth season of the American animated television series The Simpsons, and the 653rd episode overall. The episode was directed by Timothy Bailey and written by Matt Selman. It aired in the United States on Fox on February 17, 2019.

In this episode, Krusty tells the story of the time when he made a feature film in which a younger Homer and Marge were part of the crew. Comedian Marc Maron appeared as himself. The episode received positive reviews.

== Plot ==
Bart and Lisa listen to a podcast hosted by Marc Maron with Krusty the Clown as a guest. Krusty tells the story of the troubled production of his directorial debut The Sands of Space.

In the mid ‘80’s, Krusty's career is taking off following his role as the dog cop in Good Cop Dog Cop. Before he will sign on to film the sequel, Krusty wants to star in an adaptation of his favorite book, The Sands of Space. The film studio's executives agree to produce the film, but plan on cutting costs by shooting in Mexico and hiring amateurs for the crew. Most of the town of Springfield sign up for the film crew, including a young Homer Simpson and his girlfriend Marge Bouvier.

Krusty fires the director and takes over the role himself, but finds himself unable to make any decisions until he takes on Marge as his assistant director. With Marge's help, the production gets underway, but she finds it difficult to balance her job and her relationship with Homer. Krusty becomes jealous and plots to kill Homer by putting him on more and more dangerous jobs on the crew.

Homer is sent to retrieve a lizard in a sandstorm and subsequently falls unconscious in a ravine. A vision of Bart, Lisa, and Maggie as cacti appears and gives him the will to get up. However, he is captured by Mexican gangsters, and Krusty refuses to pay the ransom. Marge and the crew go to save him, pretending the film weapons are real, but the ruse is quickly seen through. Marge convinces Krusty to hand over the film to the captors, ensuring it would never be released, and dooming Krusty to a life of children's television.

In the present, Krusty and Maron travel to Mexico and learn that the movie was released as a comedy there entitled El Bozo Loco. Krusty is angry that the message of the movie was misinterpreted, but Maron reassures him that the movie had brought people together through laughter. Krusty tells him he's crazy if he thinks what he said was closure for him.

== Production ==
In July 2018 at San Diego Comic-Con, comedian Marc Maron was announced to be a guest star in this episode as himself. Several days before the episode aired, Maron revealed on his podcast that the episode would depict him interviewing Krusty on his podcast.

== Reception ==
"The Clown Stays in the Picture" scored a 0.9 rating with a 4 share and was watched by 2.75 million people.

Dennis Perkins of The A.V. Club gave the episode a B, stating "This late-game Simpsons outing is a heartening glimpse of inventiveness, and improbable near-success, in defiance of show biz machinery."

Tony Sokol of Den of Geek gave the episode 4 out of 5 stars, stating "This is a spark of the classic Simpsons. This episode is less sentimental than recent stories and is a better for it. This has been easing uncomfortably close to cloying for a few years now. A lot of people lay this at the feet of Al Jean, but every now and then we get a selfish man doing a selfless act and are relieved he's learned his lesson and will never do it again. The audience laughs when Krusty is trying to be serious and it's the best lesson of all."
