= The Burns and the Bees =

- The Simpsons episode
- Episode no.: Season 20; Episode 8
- Directed by: Mark Kirkland
- Written by: Stephanie Gillis
- Production code: KABF21
- Original air date: December 7, 2008

Guest appearances
- Mark Cuban as himself; Jeff Bezos as himself; Marv Albert as himself

Episode features
- Chalkboard gag: "Jesus is not mad his birthday is on Christmas"
- Couch gag: The family (in Christmas attire) sits on the couch, and the camera pulls out to reveal they are reflected in a Christmas ornament which is on a Christmas tree, and Santa's Little Helper and Snowball II rest nearby.

Episode chronology
← Previous "MyPods and Boomsticks"	Next → "Lisa the Drama Queen"
- The Simpsons season 20

"The Burns and the Bees" is the eighth episode of the twentieth season of the American animated television series The Simpsons. It first aired on the Fox network in the United States on December 7, 2008. In the episode, during a poker game, Mr. Burns wins ownership of the Austin Celtics basketball team and he decides to build a new stadium in Springfield that endangers a bee colony which Lisa built. Lisa's subplot refers to the current worldwide disappearance of bees.

The episode was written by Stephanie Gillis and directed by Mark Kirkland. It marks a second use of the Christmas-themed opening, first seen in "Kill Gil, Volumes I & II". Billionaires Mark Cuban and Jeff Bezos and sportscaster Marv Albert guest star as themselves.

In its original airing, the episode garnered 6.19 million viewers. It received mixed reviews from television critics.

== Plot ==
Mr. Burns attends the annual Billionaires' Retreat, where he wins the fictional Austin Celtics pro basketball team in a poker game against the Rich Texan. After witnessing the antics of Mark Cuban at a Dallas Mavericks game, Burns decides to build a luxurious sports arena to win over Springfield basketball fans, renaming the Celtics the Springfield Excitement.

Meanwhile, Jimbo, Dolph, and Kearney dare Bart to prank the second-graders by hitting a beehive with his slingshot. Lisa discovers, however, the bees in the hive are dead. Groundskeeper Willie explains the bees are dying all over Springfield by loss of habitat, thus contracting a fatal disease. Lisa seeks help from a reluctant Homer, informing him that there will be no more honey without the bees to produce it, and Professor Frink has an uninfected queen bee sting Lisa, releasing pheromones which attract many uninfected bees, which form a bee beard.

After trying to keep the bees in the Simpson home, Lisa and Marge find an abandoned greenhouse for the bees to live in. However, the site of the greenhouse is exactly where Burns plans to construct his new arena. Lisa attempts to convince the town to save the bee population, but despite her logical protest that they always get into trouble when they ignore her advice, she fails when Burns informs everyone about the amazing features of his arena.

Homer and Moe attempt to help save the bees by mating a queen bee from Lisa's hive with Moe's Africanized bees to create a hybrid bee species strong enough to survive anywhere. Six weeks later, on the night of the grand opening of Burns' sports arena, Homer takes Lisa to the top of a hill and shows her the hive containing the hybrid bees. When Homer accidentally releases them, the bees attack Burns' new arena, which resembles a beehive. In the end, the arena is legally declared a bee sanctuary, enabling the bees to survive. At the next billionaires' retreat one year later, Burns reveals how much the bees cost him ($804 million). After it is discovered that he is four million dollars short of a billion ($996,036,000), he is kicked out of the retreat and into the millionaires' camp. Much to his horror, these millionaires got rich thanks to their low-class businesses, such as a minor-league hockey team.

== Production ==
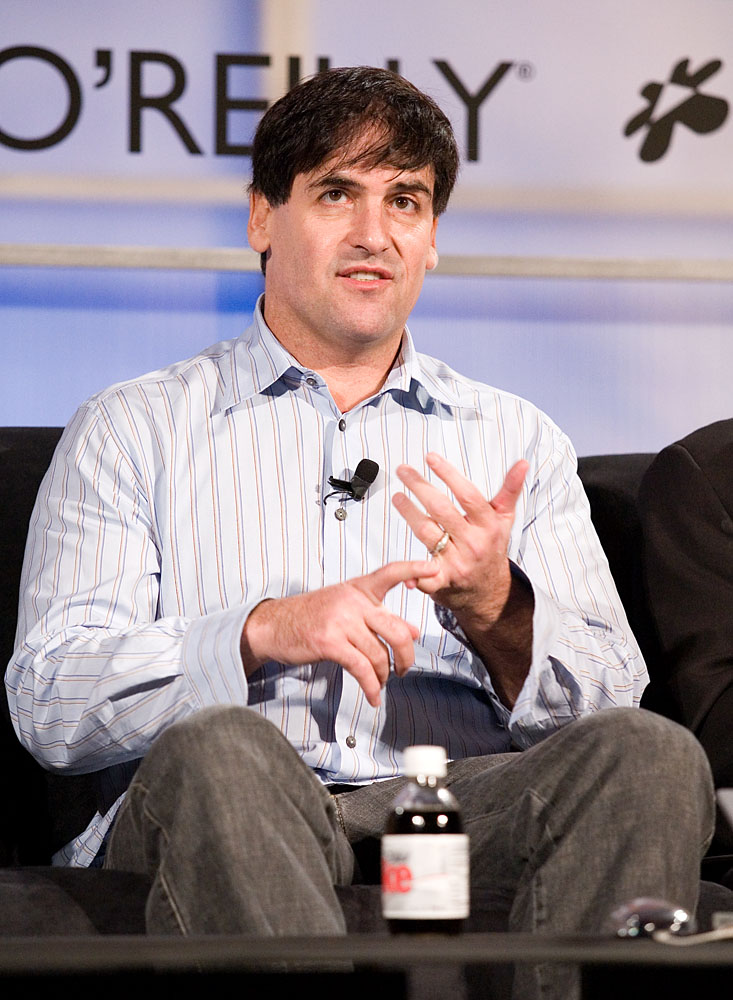
Mark Cuban guest starred in the episode.

The episode was written by Stephanie Gillis and directed by Mark Kirkland. Billionaires Mark Cuban and Jeff Bezos and sportscaster Marv Albert guest star as themselves. The episode marks a second use of the Christmas-themed opening, first seen in "Kill Gil, Volumes I & II".

== Cultural references ==
The episode's title is a reference to the expression "The birds and the bees", used by parents when explaining a sexual relationship to a child.

Lisa's subplot refers to the worldwide disappearance of bees known as Colony Collapse Disorder. In a scene where Homer imagines a future without honey, a small green robot resembling WALL-E from the 2008 film WALL-E, gives him a bottle of honey and then turns Homer into a cube. The bee tombstone that set Jerry Seinfeld a reference to the 2007 film Bee Movie where Seinfeld played as the voice of Barry. The Billionaires' Retreat is the parody of the Bohemian Club.

In the opening sequence, Mr. Burns appears to be Ebenezer Scrooge with Smithers as Jacob Marley from A Christmas Carol. The statue of Mr. Burns outside his new basketball arena is based on the Nike, Inc. "Jumpman" logo featuring Michael Jordan. Just before Burns is thrown out of the Billionaires' retreat, he asks Mark Cuban if he can let him "off the hook, for old times' sake" and Cuban refuses, referring to the scene in the 1972 film, The Godfather, in which Salvatore Tessio is led away to be executed after being revealed as a traitor. The Billionaires play Quidditch, as it is depicted in the Harry Potter film series, and use the paintings, Mona Lisa by Leonardo da Vinci, Whistler's Mother by James Abbott McNeill Whistler and The Scream by Edvard Munch, as target practice.

The songs featured in the episode include "Hip Hop Hooray" by Naughty by Nature during Mr. Burns' attempt to be more like Mark Cuban, and "Sea of Love" as performed by The Honeydrippers, which Homer and Moe play to their bees. Scott Joplin's "Maple Leaf Rag" is also played in the episode.

== Reception ==
In its original airing, the episode garnered 6.19 million viewers. The episode received mixed reviews from critics.

Robert Canning of IGN gave the episode 7/10 and said that with an episode like this "I just don't laugh as much as I would have liked".

Steve Heisler of The A.V. Club gave the episode a grade of B and said it was "okay", but "boring".

Erich Asperschlager of TV Verdict wrote: "Part of me knows that the only way to enjoy the modern incarnation of The Simpsons is to stop expecting its stories to make sense. [The episode is] not straightforward at all. It’s like sometime after the tenth season, The Simpsons writers started using Mad Libs to generate story ideas. In fact, I’ve got a sneaking suspicion the only reason this episode exists is because someone came up with the title 'The Burns and the Bees' and just had to make it work."

Harry Shearer received a nomination for a Primetime Emmy Award for Emmy Award for Outstanding Voice-Over Performance for his role as Mr. Burns, Smithers, Lenny and Dr. Hibbert in this episode, but lost to fellow Simpsons cast member Dan Castellaneta.

Stephanie Gillis was nominated for a Writers Guild of America Award in the Animation category in 2010 for writing the episode. The Simpsons was the only show to be nominated in the category, with the other nominated episodes being "Take My Life, Please", "Eeny Teeny Maya Moe", "Gone Maggie Gone" and "Wedding for Disaster". The winner, "Wedding for Disaster," was announced on February 20, 2010.
