= Heartbreak Hotel (The Simpsons) =

- The Simpsons episode
- Episode no.: Season 30; Episode 2
- Directed by: Steven Dean Moore
- Written by: Renee Ridgeley; Matt Selman
- Production code: XABF15
- Original air date: October 7, 2018

Guest appearances
- Rhys Darby as Tad Tuckerbag; Renee Ridgeley as Honey; George Segal as Nick; Joe Clabby as Curtis

Episode chronology
| ← Previous "Bart's Not Dead" | Next → "My Way or the Highway to Heaven" |
- The Simpsons season 30

"Heartbreak Hotel" is the 641st overall episode of the American animated television series The Simpsons and the second episode of the thirtieth season. It aired in the United States on Fox on October 7, 2018. The episode was directed by Steven Dean Moore and written by Renee Ridgeley and Matt Selman.

In the episode, Marge and Homer take part in Marge's favorite reality television show, but they are the first team eliminated. Sequestered while the rest of the show is filmed, Marge is angered that Homer caused them to lose and returns to the competition with another partner when the opportunity arises. However, Marge causes them to lose, making viewers feel sorry for Homer.

Selman was inspired to write the episode because he felt sorry for the person eliminated first on the television series Top Chef, and the parody of the film Who's Afraid of Virginia Woolf? came from his wife and co-writer Renee Ridgeley. Rhys Darby and George Segal guest starred. The episode was watched by 4.6 million people and received positive reviews.

== Plot ==
The Simpson family is watching a reality television survival show called The Amazing Place. Marge reveals her expert knowledge of the show's contestant challenges comes from her lifetime of watching the past 47 seasons. Bart and Lisa heavily encourage Homer and Marge to audition, but Marge shows them samples from their past tryouts for the show, which were all rejected. Lisa edits the efforts into a new submission without telling Marge and Homer, and shows it to the producers at an in-person audition. The producers are attracted to the idea of rewarding an ultimate fan of the show and the show's host Tad Tuckerbag visits Homer and Marge to invite them onto the show.

At the first challenge, while still at The Amazing Place's tarmac starting line, the contestants play "Suitcase Stowaway" to find an item in their own luggage that does not belong. Marge and Homer immediately lose and are eliminated. Heartbroken, they then find out they cannot leave for six weeks and are to be sequestered at the airport hotel. While Marge is miserable and homesick, Homer cheers her up with all the freebies they are given including room service, food, booze, and movies. At the hotel, the two find the post production room and a furious Marge discovers that Homer caused their loss by eating the "stowaway" item, a bar of chocolate. In a black and white vignette, five weeks into the competition, a bickering Marge and Homer invite another eliminated married couple, Nick and Honey, over to their room. Marge proceeds to make Homer jealous by flirting with Nick.

The next day, Tuckerbag shocks the eliminated contestants by telling them that two of them can re-enter the game to compete in the final $1 million challenge—but only if they do the "Dead Weight Drop" where they dump their partner and choose any of the other contestants to replace them. Everyone else declines except for Marge, who declares she will cut Homer loose and join forces with Nick. The final "Mango Tango" challenge involves picking mangoes, creating mangorita cocktails with them, and crossing a log-covered trench while playing a penny whistle to calm down a pack of ravenous mango-loving monkeys. In her haste to win, Marge fails to salt the mangorita rims in time, causing her and Nick to lose to same-sex couple Barry and Shawn's properly-prepared cocktails. At home, Marge bemoans her error and apologizes to Homer for how she treated him. He forgives her, saying it is nice for once that he is being the one pitied on publicly for Marge's screw-ups instead of the other way round.

== Production ==
Executive producer and co-writer Matt Selman stated that the inspiration for the episode was feeling bad for so many years for the first person kicked off of the reality television series Top Chef, which he deemed to be "worse than not being on the show at all." The idea to parody the film Who's Afraid of Virginia Woolf? in the middle of the episode came from Selman's wife and co-writer of the episode Renee Ridgeley, who herself has a small cameo as the character Honey in the segment. Actor George Segal was only asked to guest star and record his part within a week of the episode going to air. This was because it was only when a friend told Selman that George Segal had said Who's Afraid of Virginia Woolf? was his favorite movie he was ever in they thought about getting him, so the staff tracked him down as fast as they could. Selman stated that he was "delighted to reprise the voice." When directing Segal reprising his role of Nick, Selman simply told him "just do it how Mike Nichols said to." The episode was supposed to air in season 29, but was later postponed to season 30 as "Flanders' Ladder" was set to be the season 29 finale.

== Cultural references ==
The Amazing Place - the fictional reality adventure game show, which provides basis of the episode - is based on similar reality shows such as Survivor and The Amazing Race. The show's host, Tad Tuckerbag, is based on veteran New Zealand television personality and host of The Amazing Race, Phil Keoghan (and is voiced by fellow New Zealander Rhys Darby).

The episode parodies the 1966 film Who’s Afraid of Virginia Woolf? with George Segal reprising his role from the film.

== Reception ==
=== Viewing figures ===
"Heartbreak Hotel" scored a 1.8 rating with a 7 share and was watched by 4.60 million people, making The Simpsons Fox's highest rated show of the night.

=== Critical response ===
Tony Sokol of Den of Geek gave the episode 3 out of 5 points stating, "Public humiliation is the best humiliation. The Simpson family may have bad memories when it comes to their own public appearances, but they thrive on the repressed anguish that comes from being under the microscope. The premise was fresh in showing us how hotel living could be the answer to all life's problems. 'Heartbreak Hotel' offers a diverse entry into the season, which is still underwhelming.

Dennis Perkins of The A.V. Club gave the episode a B− stating, "'Heartbreak Hotel' does a fine job at supplying a motivation that—while new to us—is true to the characters. Especially Marge, whose decades-long addiction to the reality competition travel show The Amazing Place is seen to be rooted in the long Homer-less hours as a football-and-Moe's widow. Marge explains that, while Homer has his pursuits, she has hers in the form of an encyclopedic knowledge of every hashtagged event, stunt, and twist her favorite show can throw at its grasping contestants."
