= Once Upon a Time in Springfield =

- The Simpsons episode
- Promotional image
- Episode no.: Season 21; Episode 10
- Directed by: Matthew Nastuk
- Written by: Stephanie Gillis
- Production code: LABF20
- Original air date: January 10, 2010

Guest appearances
- Anne Hathaway as Princess Penelope; Eartha Kitt as herself; Maurice LaMarche as Nuclear Power Plant Security Guard; Gary Larson as himself; Jackie Mason as Rabbi Hyman Krustofsky

Episode features
- Chalkboard gag: "The world may end in 2012, but this show won't"
- Couch gag: The couch is seen inside a human egg. Each family member is a sperm cell swimming towards and penetrating the egg to sit on the couch. The zygote then divides multiple times, forming a Mr. Burns embryo, whose first words are, "Ex-cellent!"

Episode chronology
← Previous "Thursdays with Abie"	Next → "Million Dollar Maybe"
- The Simpsons season 21

"Once Upon a Time in Springfield" is the tenth episode of the twenty-first season of the American animated television series The Simpsons. It originally aired on the Fox network in the United States on January 10, 2010. It was promoted as the 450th episode of the series, but is actually the 451st, and aired alongside The Simpsons 20th Anniversary Special – In 3-D! On Ice!. The episode is dedicated to posthumous guest star Eartha Kitt, who died December 25, 2008, over one year before the episode first aired.

In the episode, The Krusty the Clown Show is once again reconstructed. This time, in a bid to get girls to watch the show, a female character named Princess Penelope is hired as Krusty's latest sidekick. Meanwhile, a corporate recruiter persuades Homer, Lenny, and Carl to work for a nuclear plant in Capital City, after Mr. Burns announces a moratorium on free doughnuts. The episode was written by Stephanie Gillis and directed by Matthew Nastuk.

The episode has received positive reviews from critics, and in 2014, showrunner Al Jean selected it as one of five essential episodes in the show's history.

It received a Nielsen rating of 6.9/17 in the 18–49 demographic and in 2010 was nominated for two awards at the Primetime Emmy Awards, winning one for Anne Hathaway's voice-over performance.

== Plot ==
Krusty the Clown is informed by his producers that his show is dropping in ratings with the demographics of young girls, and therefore they will introduce a new character named Princess Penelope. Her act features singing, glitter, and a unicorn, which — though immediately attracting a youthful female audience — disgusts the series' predominately male audience, as well as Krusty himself. Soon, the Krustylu Studio becomes almost completely filled with girls (including Lisa), and all of Krusty's merchandise is replaced by that of Penelope's. However, Bart does not like it and complains that "...women ruin all the great things" (the Army, the Fantastic Four and American Idol "that would be better with only Simon Cowell and Randy Jackson"). Bart demands that Krusty does something to restore the show.

Krusty follows Bart's advice and confronts Penelope in her dressing room. Penelope admits she has followed Krusty ever since she was a young girl, who grew up in Mineola, Long Island, New York. They consequently discover that they share a mutual attraction towards one another. Subsequent episodes of The Krusty the Clown Show feature the two singing love songs to one another, culminating in Krusty's marriage proposal to Penelope and the latter's acceptance. On the wedding day, Bart and Milhouse attempt to sabotage the marriage by showing Penelope Krusty's former wives, Holly Hippie and Eartha Kitt (who divorced Krusty six hours after they got married), who both despise him. Penelope still wants to get married, but Krusty decides that he is not good enough for Penelope and cancels the wedding. Penelope moves to France, only to discover that Krusty is there and apologizes for leaving her. She accepts and the two float down the Seine River together into the night.

In the subplot, budgeting issues cause Mr. Burns to eliminate donuts from the lunch room, shocking Homer, Lenny, and Carl. While at Moe's Tavern, a corporate recruiter named Gator McCall offers them a job at the Capital City Nuclear Power Plant. The trio agree to take a tour, where they discover there are luxurious working conditions, including free massages, sushi, and cartoonist Gary Larson, who has come out of retirement to draw The Far Side cartoons for plant employees. They accept the offer.

As Homer, Lenny, and Carl carry their personal possessions from Springfield Nuclear Power Plant, Mr. Burns confronts them. After begging is unsuccessful, Burns offers to reinstate even better donuts if they return to work at his power plant. The trio then accepts the offer.

== Production ==
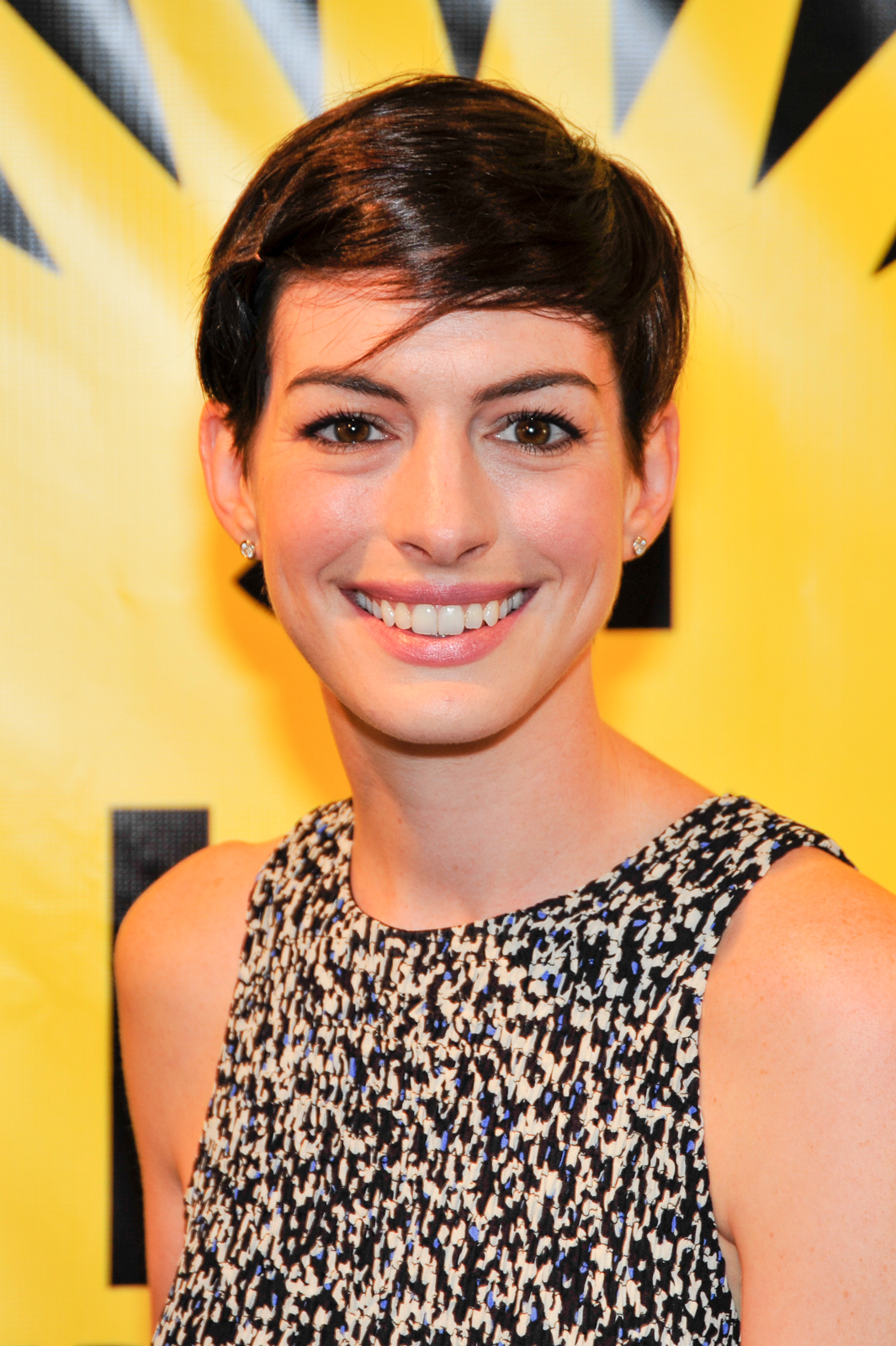
Anne Hathaway guest starred as Princess Penelope

The episode features Anne Hathaway's return to The Simpsons, this time voicing Princess Penelope. Jackie Mason returns to voice Krusty the Clown's father Rabbi Hyman Krustofsky. This is one of Eartha Kitt's final television appearances, who posthumously guest-starred as herself, being an ex-wife of Krusty's. Hathaway said that she grew up watching the show with her brothers, and said that "it stuck with me...high school, college, post, everything. I always stop whenever it's on".

== Cultural references ==
The title is in reference to Once Upon a Time in America. The opening chalkboard gag makes a reference to the 2012 phenomenon in which the world was supposed to end on December 21, 2012. Homer, Lenny, and Carl get to see a comic from the comic series The Far Side (but not the audience) which includes a lion and an X-ray.

While Penelope is playing the guitar in Paris, Tintin and Captain Haddock are listening at one table, crying and hugging. Penelope is not a real princess, despite her full name being Penelope Mountbatten Habsburg Hohenzollern Mulan Pocahontas.

Lisa's teacher, who was wearied by all of the reports by the girls of her class about various princesses as inspirational women, said there had been one report on Princess Anne, fifteen on Princess Diana, two on "baby Princess Ingrid Alexandra of Norway" and one on Princess Leia.

== Reception ==
In its original American broadcast, "Once Upon a Time in Springfield" earned a 6.8 Nielsen rating in the 18–49 demographic. In all, the show was watched by 21.07 million viewers and an 18–49 rating of 8.8/22. The larger-than-normal viewership was a result of the episode following the National Football League playoffs. It was the most watched episode of the show since season 16's "Homer and Ned's Hail Mary Pass", which aired after Super Bowl XXXIX. The episode ranked 8th in the ratings becoming the second highest viewed show on Fox and top rated scripted show on Fox. The episode also came in 5th for the 18–48 rating becoming the top rated scripted programming of the week with a rating of 9.084 million watching and rating of 6.9.

The episode has received positive reviews from critics.

IGN's Robert Canning wrote that "it may not be turning out classic after classic after classic, but The Simpsons can still deliver smart and solid entertainment" and rated the episode 8/10.

Emily VanDerWerff of The A.V. Club, while writing that the plot was "something the show has done many, many times before", stated that the episode was "funny [...] with a nice amount of heart", and graded it a B.

Jason Hughes of TV Squad praised Hathaway's performance, but said that he was "a little disappointed" because the anniversary episode did not focus on the Simpson family.

Tom Maurstad of The Dallas Morning News gave the episode a positive review writing "tonight's 450th episode, 'Once Upon a Time in Springfield' is rock solid. Maybe it's not one for the ages, but it's full of quotable lines and casually hilarious moments."

TV Fanatic stated "Well, as compared to any other episode, "Once Upon a Time in Springfield," was a fantastic outing by The Simpsons". TV Fanatic gave the episode an A, calling it "An excellent episode, though its flaws won’t allow me to give it an A+. Nevertheless, it rates a solid A from me."

The episode was nominated for Primetime Emmy Award for Outstanding Animated Program at the 62nd Primetime Creative Arts Emmy Awards, and Anne Hathaway was also nominated for Outstanding Voice-Over Performance for her role as Princess Penelope running against The Simpsons cast members Dan Castellaneta for "Thursdays with Abie" and Hank Azaria for "Moe Letter Blues." Although the episode did not win, on August 21, 2010, it was announced that Hathaway won.
