= 101 Mitigations =

- The Simpsons episode
- Episode no.: Season 30; Episode 15
- Directed by: Mark Kirkland
- Story by: Rob LaZebnik
- Teleplay by: Brian Kelley; Dan Vebber
- Original air date: March 3, 2019

Guest appearance
- Guillermo del Toro as himself

Episode features
- Chalkboard gag: "Chili fries do not go in like a lamb and out like a lion"
- Couch gag: The Simpson family arrives on the couch as cups, with cup fillers on top filling them. Duff Beer for Homer, Diet Buzz for Marge, lemonade for Lisa, Baby Buzz for Maggie, and Buzz Cola for Bart. Homer's cup overflows and he falls on the floor saying "Refill".

Episode chronology
← Previous "The Clown Stays in the Picture"	Next → "I Want You (She's So Heavy)"
- The Simpsons season 30

"101 Mitigations" is the fifteenth episode of the thirtieth season of the American animated television series The Simpsons, and the 654th episode overall. The episode was directed by Mark Kirkland with a story by Rob LaZebnik and teleplay by Brian Kelley and Dan Vebber. It aired in the United States on Fox on March 3, 2019.

In this episode, Homer is arrested for stealing Comic Book Guy's car, and he seeks forgiveness from both the judge on the case and Comic Book Guy. Filmmaker Guillermo del Toro guest starred as himself. The episode received mixed reviews.

== Plot ==
Homer, Bart, Lisa and Maggie are eating at The Gilded Truffle, where they used a misprinted coupon good for 100% off. Meanwhile, with the saved money, Marge gets a Swedish massage. Outside the restaurant, Homer warns the kids to not hustle to get ahead in life. The valet parking attendant Raphael hands Homer the keys to the wrong car, a fancy 1957 seafoam Cadillac Eldorado Biarritz convertible. They drive away with it, having fun on the road. When they go back to the restaurant, Comic Book Guy accuses them of stealing his father's car, and when he notices his mint condition copy of Radioactive Man #1 was damaged, he presses charges and Homer is arrested. In court, Judge Snyder finds Homer guilty, even after a touching apology letter written by Lisa.

With two weeks before Homer's sentencing hearing, Marge goes to The Android's Dungeon & Baseball Card Shop to negotiate with Comic Book Guy, who says the issue is about getting respect. At home, Lisa discovers sentencing mitigation videos, including one employed by Mr. Burns for one of his crimes against Springfield, portraying him in a more sympathetic light as a product of a neglected and bullied childhood. The family's efforts to produce a mitigation video for Homer fall short but Lisa is able to splice together the work using her Final Cut Pro skills. In court, Snyder is initially open to setting Homer free but Comic Book Guy delivers an impassioned courtroom speech, the best Snyder has ever heard. He will deliver his verdict the next day.

Lisa finds a replacement Radioactive Man #1 online in a nearby Ogdenville comic book shop, though it fails to quell Comic Book Guy's grudge against Homer. However, he notices Homer's 1975 season one Welcome Back, Kotter keychain, a "precious totem" to Homer, the only gift his father ever gave him. To make Homer feel how he felt with his beloved car and comic, Comic Book Guy smashes the keychain with Thor's hammer Mjölnir, then agrees to drop the charges. He also befriends Homer and invites him to come to Comic-Con with him.

In the epilogue, Bart is shown in detention at school being supervised by Principal Skinner. Bart shows Skinner a prank sentencing mitigation video with Milhouse extolling Bart's transformation, while the video plays Bart escapes from the room.

== Production ==
Filmmaker Guillermo del Toro guest starred as himself, directing a video about Mr. Burns. Del Toro previously directed the opening sequence of the twenty-fifth season episode "Treehouse of Horror XXIV."

== Reception ==
"101 Mitigations" scored a 0.8 rating with a 4 share and was watched by 2.25 million people, making The Simpsons Fox's highest rated show of the night.

Tony Sokol of Den of Geek gave the episode 4 out of 5 stars, stating "What did we learn from this episode? Certainly not the intended lesson that moments of pure joy always have consequences, it is German is earth's closest language to Klingon. The episode is funny and revelatory, though not always tummy rumbling funny. '101 Mitigations' contains a good mix of the clever and the silly, with a moral compass set on cruise control."

Dennis Perkins of The A.V. Club gave the episode a C+, stating "For Homer to finally understand the pain his wacky weekly nonsense causes to another person could be a loaded moment, dramatically. But the episode fudges it. The brisk running time—truncated more by del Toro's time-consuming but attention-grabbing cameo—leaves Homer and CBG's rapprochement hanging unsatisfactorily, pawned off on the joke that Homer regards CBG's invitation to Comic-Con as barely preferable to prison. The Simpsons has room for its characters' signature misbehaviors to be deconstructed in a meaningful way. It's a shame '101 Mitigations' doesn't."
