= Werking Mom =

- The Simpsons episode
- Episode no.: Season 30; Episode 7
- Directed by: Mike Frank Polcino
- Written by: Carolyn Omine; Robin Sayers
- Production code: XABF21
- Original air date: November 18, 2018

Guest appearances
- Raja / Sutan Amrull as themself; RuPaul as Queen Chante; Scott Thompson as Grady

Episode chronology
← Previous "From Russia Without Love"	Next → "Krusty the Clown"
- The Simpsons season 30

"Werking Mom" is the 646th episode of the American animated television series The Simpsons and the seventh episode of the thirtieth season. It aired in the United States on Fox on November 18, 2018. The episode was directed by Mike Frank Polcino and written by Carolyn Omine and Robin Sayers.

In this episode, Marge successfully sells plastic containers because the buyers think she is a drag queen while Lisa tries to anonymously bring joy to others. RuPaul and Scott Thompson guest starred. Raja / Sutan Amrull guest starred as themself. The episode received positive reviews.

The episode was also dedicated in memory of Stan Lee of Marvel Comics fame, who died on November 12, 2018, and had guest starred three times on the show, in the episodes "I Am Furious (Yellow)", "Married to the Blob" and "The Caper Chase" respectively. And on the July 28, 2019 rerun to Russi Taylor, who died two days before the rerun.

== Plot ==
Marge attempts to earn extra money by arranging Tubberware parties, but no one is eager to host. Her hairdresser Julio agrees to play host, and invites many of his fellow gay friends. When Marge seems nervous, he gives her an over-the-top makeover. The party goes well, until Julio realizes that the guests have mistaken Marge for a drag queen. He later convinces Marge to just go with it, and introduces her to Springfield's drag scene. When Homer realizes what she's doing, he interrupts a party and reveals her true gender, a decision he immediately regrets. Marge is furious, but when Homer shows up to the drag club dressed like a woman, she forgives him.

Meanwhile, in an homage to the movie Amélie, Lisa discovers a box that belonged to Jasper when he was a child. She secretly returns it, greatly cheering him up. She decides to help all of Springfield's outcasts, including Gil, Agnes and Seymour Skinner, and the Van Houtens. When Agnes discovers the trick, Lisa is ashamed, but those people she helped invite her to lunch on the roof of the school as they appreciate her efforts.

== Production ==
RuPaul was cast as Queen Chante, who is a drag queen. Raja, the winner of season 3 of RuPaul's Drag Race, also appeared as herself.

== Reception ==
=== Viewing figures ===
"Werking Mom" scored a 1.6 rating with a 7 share and was watched by 4.34 million people, making The Simpsons Fox's highest rated show of the night.

=== Critical response ===
Dennis Perkins of The A.V. Club gave the episode a B+ ranking, stating "'Werking Mom’ is written by Carolyn Omine, who’s been credited with some of the most grounded and surprising (in that good way) Simpsons episodes in recent years...Alongside first-time co-writer Robin Sayers, whose only other IMDb credit is for a Jerky Boys project unpromisingly enough, Omine has penned a spiritual sequel to ‘Homer's Phobia’ that might not equal one of the show’s most groundbreaking and enduringly funny episodes, but is still so locked onto the core of the show’s heart that it provides a blueprint for the show going forward, should anyone in The Simpsons’ hierarchy care to listen."

Tony Sokol of Den of Geek gave the episode 3 and a half out of 5 points ranking, stating "'Werking Mom' is a sweet episode, not unlike mille-feuille pastry. Everyone gets what they want. Lisa finds a place to eat her lunch. Marge is reassured. Homer both regains the will to drink and a place to store his pot. Such is the power of dinner party salespersonship and inclusion, at least of an exciting beat. The jokes work playfully but softly without subversive rancor or larger social commentary. It is a family episode in other people's homes."

== See also ==
- Victor/Victoria, a film about a woman who gains notoriety by purporting to be a female impersonator
- Cross-dressing in film and television
