= D'oh Canada =

- The Simpsons episode
- Episode no.: Season 30; Episode 21
- Directed by: Matthew Nastuk
- Written by: Tim Long & Miranda Thompson
- Production code: YABF14
- Original air date: April 28, 2019

Guest appearances
- Awkwafina as Dr. Chang; Judy Blume as herself; Lucas Meyer as Justin Trudeau

Episode features
- Chalkboard gag: Bart writes "Haw Haw!" on the blackboard, but then hits it, that turns around to reveal Nelson attached to it with duct tape.
- Couch gag: Repeat of the couch gag from "How the Test Was Won", "Coming to Homerica" and "Moe Goes from Rags to Riches".

Episode chronology
← Previous "I'm Just a Girl Who Can't Say D'oh"	Next → "Woo-Hoo Dunnit?"
- The Simpsons season 30

"D'oh Canada" is the twenty-first episode of the thirtieth season of the American animated television series The Simpsons, and the 660th episode overall. The episode was directed by Matthew Nastuk and written by Tim Long and Miranda Thompson. It aired in the United States on Fox on April 28, 2019. The title of the episode is a play on the Canadian national anthem "O Canada".

In this episode, Lisa falls down Niagara Falls and is given asylum in Canada while Marge tries to bring her home. Awkwafina and Lucas Meyer guest starred. Author Judy Blume appeared as herself. "D'oh Canada" received mostly positive reviews but drew some controversy from Canadians, particularly Newfoundlanders, and Upstate New Yorkers.

== Plot ==
The Simpson family is at the Mt. Splashmore water park, in line to ride the water slide, when Homer suddenly hustles the family out of the park. He reveals that he has earned two million soon-to-expire hotel rewards loyalty points, and takes them to Niagara Falls, traveling through upstate New York. At the falls, Lisa accidentally plunges over the falls while roughhousing with Bart and ends up on the Canadian side, where she is rescued by a Mountie.

Lisa is taken to a hospital where she is kept for observation. Homer balks at the cost but is reminded that Canadian healthcare is free. Lisa tells the Mountie three complaints about America: voter suppression, utter disregard for the environment, and "a President who's such a son-of-a-". The Mountie says, "We know," and declares Lisa a political refugee.

Lisa is placed in a foster home, while the rest of the family return to Springfield. Lisa starts attending Alanis Morissette Elementary School, and Skypes with Prime Minister Justin Trudeau. When asked about the SNC-Lavalin affair, he quickly escapes out the window.

At the Detroit River on Ambassador Bridge, Marge hides in Squeaky-Voiced Teen's car to get to the foster home, and forces Lisa to return home. However they learn that they cannot return to Springfield due to deportation, and are thus stuck in Canada.

Marge however plans to cross the border line but Lisa is still unsure if she wants to leave Canada. She then has a vision of several of her favorite American figures including Abraham Lincoln, Dumbo, Aretha Franklin, Eleanor Roosevelt, Seabiscuit the horse, Watson the computer who won Jeopardy!, Judy Blume, and Louis Armstrong, who convince her to go home. With the help of Bart and Homer, Lisa and Marge sneak across a frozen river back to the United States.

== Production ==
=== Development ===
The episode was co-written by Tim Long and his wife Miranda Thompson. Long felt that Bart represented the qualities of the United States while Lisa represented the qualities of Canada, so it made sense for him to make Lisa the one who wants to stay in Canada. Long stated that writing for episodes continue as late as possible into the production process to allow for current references such as the SNC-Lavalin affair.

=== Casting ===
Journalist Lucas Meyer from Toronto guest starred as Canadian Prime Minister Justin Trudeau. Meyer gained notability for his various impressions on YouTube. The video was noticed by the show's producers. He was contacted in September 2018 for the role, and after auditioning by phone, he received the offer. Trudeau was offered to play himself, but he declined.

Awkwafina appeared as Lisa's doctor in Canada. She played a different character earlier in the season. Writer Judy Blume appeared as herself.

=== Release ===
The episode was expected to air in September 2019 but was moved up to April.

== Cultural references ==
Homer's satirical song about Upstate New York is a parody of Frank Sinatra's "Theme from New York, New York."

When the Mountie picks out a random hockey team for Lisa to become a fan of, he chooses the Ottawa Senators, much to her dismay ("Please not Ottawa, please not Ottawa!"). The Senators finished in last place in the 2018–19 NHL season.

== Reception and controversy ==
=== Viewing figures ===
"D'oh Canada" scored a 0.8 rating with a 4 share and was watched by 1.93 million people.

=== Critical response ===
Dennis Perkins of The A.V. Club gave the episode a B−, stating, "’D’oh Canada’ wants to skewer its targets on the American side of the border by having Lisa's infatuation with all things Canadian (politeness, a hunky young Prime Minister, mounties with handsome horses, cape-wearing rescue beavers, free healthcare, schools that put on thought-provoking productions of Canadian literary legend Margaret Atwood’s The Handmaid's Tale) focus the show’s barbs more sharply and directly than usual."

Tony Sokol of Den of Geek gave the episode 3.5 out of 5 stars. He thought the episode was well done but not as good as the classic episodes. He highlighted the song parody and the commentary but thought the jokes could be stronger.

The musical mock salute to upstate New York drew substantial attention from the natives of that area, including a response from the New York State Republican Committee blaming the policies of Andrew Cuomo for making the region a laughingstock and a fact check from the Rochester Democrat and Chronicle, which concluded most of the claims were true but that some (such as Fox News viewership and disability claims) were misleading or unprovable. The Great New York State Fair responded that they were taking the song in jest but would invite the writers to the fair to allow them to see the area in person.

The episode came under fire in late April 2019 for offending some people. While the episode mocked American President Donald Trump and then Canadian Prime Minister Justin Trudeau and brought up the SNC-Lavalin affair, the aspects that caused offense were largely related to the Frank Sinatra parody song where Homer made fun of Upstate New York and for the use of the term "newfie" in relation to Canadian residents of Newfoundland. In the latter several Canadian children chime "stupid newfies" before a character closely resembling Ralph Wiggum calls himself one and proceeds to beat a baby seal pup plush toy with a club while singing about being a Newfoundlander. Musician Bruce Moss rejected an offer from the show's producers to use his song "The Islander" for the episode, referring to them as "morally bankrupt" and turning down $20,000 US.
