= Mad About the Toy =

- The Simpsons episode
- Episode no.: Season 30; Episode 11
- Directed by: Rob Oliver
- Written by: Michael Price
- Production code: YABF03
- Original air date: January 6, 2019

Guest appearances
- Bryan Batt as Philip Hefflin; Bill de Blasio as himself; Lawrence O'Donnell as himself

Episode features
- Chalkboard gag: "My new year's resolution was to quit school"
- Couch gag: The Simpson family takes a break during a football game, with their friends cheering them on.
- Commentary: Matt Groening

Episode chronology
← Previous "'Tis the 30th Season"	Next → "The Girl on the Bus"
- The Simpsons season 30

"Mad About the Toy" is the eleventh episode of the thirtieth season of the American animated television series The Simpsons, and the 650th episode overall. The episode was directed by Rob Oliver and written by Michael Price. It aired in the United States on Fox on January 6, 2019.

In this episode, Grampa gets a panic attack when he sees toy soldiers that look like himself, so the Simpson family investigates how Grampa's likeness appeared on the toys. Bryan Batt guest starred as Philip Hefflin. New York City Mayor Bill de Blasio and political analyst Lawrence O'Donnell appeared as themselves. The episode received mixed reviews.

The episode won the Primetime Emmy Award for Outstanding Animated Program in 2019. It was the first episode to win the award for the series in over a decade, with the previous Simpsons winner, "Eternal Moonshine of the Simpson Mind", airing in 2007.

== Plot ==
Homer and Marge celebrate their anniversary, leaving the kids at home with Grampa. Marge points out that Grampa needs to be home in an hour, so she and Homer do all their activities as fast as possible. At home, Bart and Lisa are bored and ask Grampa if they can play a game. Bart finds some plastic army men toys in the basement, which causes Grampa to panic.

The family takes him to the VA, but the doctor is unable to find out what is wrong. Lisa notices that the molding of the soldier toys resembles Grampa, then asks if the company that used him for the photos of the plastic army men paid him. Grampa recalls that in 1947 he was paid to model for the original army men, including a promise of a royalty for each toy.

Grampa ends up on Channel 6 news and shortly after reaches national headlines on NBC. After the headlines, the toy company that used Grampa for their toys invites him to visit their headquarters in New York City. The chairman tells Grampa that he missed out on millions of dollars because he never signed his contract. Grampa remembers that he ran out of the shoot because the male photographer kissed him. The company then fired the photographer for being gay. Realizing that he may have ruined the photographer's life, Grampa vows to visit him to apologize.

Lisa discovers that the photographer, Philip Hefflin, now lives in Marfa, Texas. The drive is long and the family encounters the Marfa lights and Prada Marfa. When they get to Philip's hometown, Grampa stumbles into a gallery filled with paintings of him in his army uniform. Philip greets Grampa, and thanks him for making him realize he was better off being true to himself. They enjoy time together before Grampa has to head back to Springfield.

In the backyard during the final scene, Bart, Milhouse, and Nelson are playing with the soldier toys. After Bart gets bored, he suggests melting them in the microwave, which the kids end up doing. A montage of Grampa and Philip is then shown.

== Production ==
Executive producer Al Jean was thinking about why Grampa would hang a photo of Mona in his room. Writer Michael Price had an idea about Grampa being the model for the toy army men and having a relationship with the photographer. The relationship gave the producers a reason to remove the photo and hang a new one for the rest of the season.

Director Rob Oliver spent months creating the paintings in Philip Hefflin's gallery. He analyzed the character to develop his art style and his signature on the paintings. The style was influenced by the work of Peter Max, whom Oliver met when he was young.

Bryan Batt was cast as photographer Philip Hefflin partly as a reference to his Mad Men character Sal Romano, who was fired for being gay. Jean wondered what happened to Sal and the producers gave Philip a positive fate. Then New York City mayor Bill de Blasio appeared as himself. He was originally approached for another episode but was asked to be in this episode when Grampa visits New York.

== Cultural references ==
In flashbacks, Grampa recreates the V-J Day in Times Square kiss with a random woman while referring to the original kiss possibly being non-consensual. The people in the toy company office behave like characters from Mad Men. The Simpson family encounters the Prada Marfa art installation.

== Reception ==
=== Viewing figures ===
"Mad About the Toy" scored a 0.9 rating with a 4 share and was watched by 2.33 million people, making it Fox's second highest rated show of the night, behind Family Guy.

=== Critical response ===
Tony Sokol of Den of Geek gave the episode 3 out of 5 points ranking, stating "The Simpsons' 'Mad About the Toy' plays too far to the inside and tries to have it both ways. Like Grampa's stories it takes a very circuitous road, but goes nowhere, besides Texas and New York. Grampa gets the last word, but like many of his never-ending asides, it is too much rant but not enough rave. That's what they used to say back in his day before raves were raves and Molly was just what you called a girl who went out with a gangster."

Dennis Perkins of The A.V. Club gave the episode B+ ranking, stating "It's a risk—not for addressing homosexuality, but for putting the story in the hands of Grampa, a supporting character used most often for the sort of quick-hit swipes at reactionary codgery mocking internet memes were invented for. But few characters on The Simpsons exist just as their initial stereotypes at this point, and there's a longer-than-most history of the show finding just the right touches of grudging humanity in the old coot to make 'Mad About The Toy' work."

Texas State Representative Poncho Nevárez tweeted, "If you ever wondered how Marfa would look like in the world of the Simpsons. Here you go. Nice shot of the Presidio County Courthouse", along with screenshots of Marfa as rendered in the episode.

=== Awards and nominations ===
On September 14, 2019, "Mad About the Toy" won the Primetime Emmy Award for Outstanding Animated Program at the 71st Primetime Creative Arts Emmy Awards. It marked the eleventh win for The Simpsons in the category. It was the first time the show won that award in eleven years. The previous Simpsons winner, "Eternal Moonshine of the Simpson Mind", won the award back in 2008 at the 60th Primetime Creative Arts Emmy Awards.
