= I'm Just a Girl Who Can't Say D'oh =

- The Simpsons episode
- Episode no.: Season 30; Episode 20
- Directed by: Mike Frank Polcino
- Written by: Jeff Martin; Jenna Martin
- Production code: YABF12
- Original air date: April 7, 2019

Guest appearances
- Okilly Dokilly as themselves; Josh Groban as Professor Frink's singing voice; John Lithgow as himself; Jon Lovitz as Llewellyn Sinclair

Episode features
- Chalkboard gag: "I will not write "Audit please" on Homer's tax return"
- Couch gag: Bart, Maggie, and Lisa star in the opening of "My Three Kids", with Groundskeeper Willie as angry Uncle Angus.

Episode chronology
← Previous "Girl's in the Band"	Next → "D'oh Canada"
- The Simpsons season 30

"I'm Just a Girl Who Can't Say D'oh" is the twentieth episode of the thirtieth season of the American animated television series The Simpsons, and the 659th episode overall. The episode was directed by Mike Frank Polcino and written by Jeff Martin and Jenna Martin. It aired in the United States on Fox on April 7, 2019.

In this episode, Marge directs a musical written by Lisa about Jebediah Springfield while Homer joins a baby class with Maggie. Musician Josh Groban and Jon Lovitz guest starred. Actor John Lithgow appeared as himself. The episode received negative reviews.

== Plot ==
A disgruntled cast and crew expel short-tempered perfectionist theater director Llewellyn Sinclair from their production of Oklahoma!. Marge steps up to helm a different show production written by Lisa about Springfield's founder Jebediah Springfield. Her show is a parody of Hamilton: An American Musical, a sung-and-rapped through musical about the life of American Founding Father Alexander Hamilton.

Krusty plans to air Lisa's musical, Bloody, Bloody Jebediah with Sideshow Mel in the title role, on live TV, recording the open-air production. Its title is a reference to the musical Bloody Bloody Andrew Jackson. However, Mel later drops out of the show so Marge recasts the part, finding Professor Frink (Josh Groban) has a stunning singing voice. However it is revealed that rain is forecast for the live performance. Bloody, Bloody Jebediah airs live and starts off successfully, however during a commercial break it starts pouring rain. Jebediah's bear (John Lithgow) starts to sink into a puddle so Lisa quickly rewrites the ending to the satisfaction of the audience. The production is nominated for twelve awards, with Marge winning a special award for best newcomer.

Meanwhile, Homer notices a popular baby class taking place and joins with Maggie. His confusion about the popularity is answered when he sees Chloe, the sexy supervisor running the "Daddy and Me" baby class. It all ends when another father named Barry divorces, allowing him to marry Chloe all to himself.

== Production ==
This episode was scheduled to air on April 28, 2019, but was moved to April 7, 2019 since "The Incredible Lightness of Being a Baby" was delayed to the next season after the show's producers decided to make a short film related to the episode titled Playdate with Destiny as well.

The closing credits for the episode uses a clip from the music video for the song "White Wine Spritzer" by Okilly Dokilly, a band where all members dress as Ned Flanders. The producers wanted to feature the video on the show after they watched it. The band received an email in February 2019 to ask for permission. Executive producer Al Jean had previously given approval on social media when the idea for the band was first released.

Musician Josh Groban guest starred as Professor Frink's singing voice. Three of Groban's song were previously featured in the twentieth season episode "Lisa the Drama Queen." Actor John Lithgow appeared as himself.

== Reception ==
Dennis Perkins from The A.V. Club gave the episode a C− stating, "Unfortunately, the resulting episode, 'I'm Just A Girl Who Can’t Say D'oh' is a listless, carelessly plotted outing, where character and narrative logic give way to plodding storytelling, a serious lack of jokes, and one of the least interesting (and yet vaguely irritating) B-plots in recent memory."

Tony Sokol of Den of Geek gave the episode 3 out of 5 stars. He highlighted the theater parody but thought Homer being attracted to the teacher was not in character.

"I'm Just a Girl Who Can't Say D'oh" scored a 0.7 rating with a 3 share and was watched by 1.61 million people.
