= D'oh! =

Catchphrase used by Homer Simpson

- Character: Homer Simpson; Marge Simpson; Bart Simpson; Lisa Simpson
- Actor: Dan Castellaneta
- First used in: "Punching Bag" (The Tracey Ullman Show) "Simpsons Roasting on an Open Fire" (The Simpsons)
- Also used in: It's That Man Again

"D'oh!" (/doʊʔ/) is the most famous catchphrase used by the fictional character Homer Simpson, from The Simpsons, an animated sitcom. It is an exclamation typically used after Homer injures himself, realizes that he has done something foolish, or when something bad has happened or is about to happen to him. All his prominent blood relations—son Bart, daughters Lisa and Maggie, his father, his mother and half-brother—have also been heard to use it themselves in similar circumstances. On a few occasions, Homer's wife Marge and characters outside the family such as Mr. Burns and Sideshow Bob have also used this phrase.

In 2006, "d'oh!" was listed as number six on TV Land's list of the 100 greatest television catchphrases. The spoken word "d'oh" is claimed as a sound trademark by the owner of The Simpsons, 20th Century Studios. Since 2001, the word "doh" has appeared in the Oxford English Dictionary, without the apostrophe. Early recorded usages of the sound "d'oh" are in numerous episodes of the BBC Radio series It's That Man Again between 1945 and 1949, but the OxfordWords blog notes "Homer was responsible for popularizing it as an exclamation of frustration." The term also appeared in an early issue of Mad comics, with a different spelling but the same meaning, in issue 8 (December 1953 – January 1954); in a one-page story by Harvey Kurtzman entitled "Hey Look!", a man seeking peace and quiet suddenly hears a loud radio and, grimacing, says, "D-oooh – the neighbors [sic] radio!!"

== Origin ==
Several decades before The Simpsons was aired, the exclamation "D'oh!" was used in the BBC radio comedy program, It's That Man Again, which ran from 1939 to 1949. It was the catchphrase of the formidable, but soft-hearted, character, "Miss Hotchkiss".

James Finlayson saying "D'oh!" in Men O' War (1929). Dan Castellaneta acknowledged the actor as the progenitor of the expression.

During the voice recording session for a Tracey Ullman Show short, Homer was required to utter what was written in the script as an "annoyed grunt". Dan Castellaneta rendered it as a drawn out "d'ooooooh". This was inspired by the Scottish actor Jimmy Finlayson, who had used the term in his first sound film role, in 1929's Men O' War, as a minced oath for suggesting the word "damn!" Matt Groening felt that it would better suit the timing of animation if it were spoken faster. Castellaneta then shortened it to a quickly uttered "d'oh!" The first intentional use of "d'oh!" occurred in the Ullman short "Punching Bag" (1988), and its first usage in the series was in the series premiere, "Simpsons Roasting on an Open Fire". It is typically represented in the show's script as "(annoyed grunt)", and is also spelled out as such in the official titles of several episodes. Some episodes feature variations of the word such as "Bart of Darkness" (season six, 1994), where Homer says "D'oheth" after an Amish farmer points out to him that he has built a barn instead of the swimming pool he was intending; "Thirty Minutes over Tokyo" (season ten, 1999), where Homer says "d'oh" in Japanese (with English subtitles, the spoken phrase being "shimatta baka ni", meaning roughly "damn folly"); or The Simpsons Movie (2007) where Homer bellows "d'oh-ome!" after the EPA seals the Simpsons' hometown, Springfield, in a giant dome. The spelling is made official in "El Viaje Misterioso de Nuestro Jomer (The Mysterious Voyage of Homer)" (season eight, 1997), in which Homer, after having eaten a very spicy chili, hallucinates about a tortoise and exclaims a loud "d'oh!" as he realizes that he needs to follow the slow animal in order to find out about his soul mate.

== Episode names ==
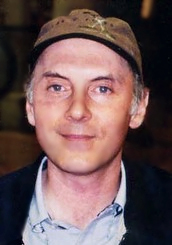
Dan Castellaneta, voice of Homer Simpson

As the word arose out of Castellaneta's interpretation of a non-specific direction, it did not have an official spelling for several years. Instead, it was always written in Simpsons scripts as "(Annoyed Grunt)", later being spelled "d'oh", as it remains today.

- "Simpsoncalifragilisticexpiala(Annoyed Grunt)cious" (Season 8, 1997)
- "D'oh-in' in the Wind" (Season 10, 1998)
- "E-I-E-I-(Annoyed Grunt)" (Season 11, 1999)
- "Days of Wine and D'oh'ses" (Season 11, 2000)
- "C.E.D'oh" (Season 14, 2003)
- "I, (Annoyed Grunt)-Bot" (Season 15, 2004)
- "We're on the Road to D'ohwhere" (Season 17, 2006)
- "G.I. (Annoyed Grunt)" (Season 18, 2006)
- "He Loves to Fly and He D'ohs" (Season 19, 2007)
- "Waverly Hills, 9-0-2-1-D'oh" (Season 20, 2009)
- "The Greatest Story Ever D'ohed" (Season 21, 2010)
- "The Falcon and the D'ohman" (Season 23, 2011)
- "The D'oh-cial Network" (Season 23, 2012)
- "I'm Just a Girl Who Can't Say D'oh" (Season 30, 2019)
- "D'oh Canada" (Season 30, 2019)

== Dictionary ==
The term "d'oh!" has been used or adopted by many Simpsons fans as well as non-fans. The term has become commonplace in modern speech and demonstrates the extent of the show's influence. "D'oh!" was first added to the Oxford Dictionary of English in 1998 as an interjection with the definition "(usually [in a manner] mildly derogatory) used to comment on an action perceived as foolish or stupid."

In 2001, the word "d'oh" was added to the Oxford English Dictionary; The definition given is:

"Expressing frustration at the realisation that things have turned out badly or not as planned, or that one has just said or done something foolish. Also (usu. mildly derogatory): implying that another person has said or done something foolish" (cf. DUH int.).

The headword spelling is doh, but d'oh is listed as a variant (as is dooh). The etymology section notes "the word appears (in the form D'oh) in numerous publications based on The Simpsons". Eight quotations featuring the sound "d'oh" are cited: the earliest is from a 1945 episode of the BBC radio series It's That Man Again; two others are Simpsons-related.

== See also ==
- ¡Ay, caramba!
- Facepalm
