= Bart's Not Dead =

- The Simpsons episode
- Episode no.: Season 30; Episode 1
- Directed by: Bob Anderson
- Written by: Stephanie Gillis
- Production code: XABF19
- Original air date: September 30, 2018

Guest appearances
- Dave Attell as Luke; Emily Deschanel as Marge Simpson (Actress); Gal Gadot as Lisa Simpson (Actress); Jonathan Groff as Bart Simpson (Actor); Pete Holmes as Matthew; Leonard Nimoy as himself (stock footage); Kiefer Sutherland as Jack Bauer (stock footage)

Episode features
- Couch gag: A futuristic floating TV is seen showing a clip of "Simpsons Roasting on an Open Fire". Suddenly, a green alien hand turns the TV off with a remote. The scene then cuts to green alien versions of the family sitting on a futuristic floating couch in a futurized version of the living room. The alien Homer then begins to ask the others about the real Homer's voice.

Episode chronology
← Previous "Flanders' Ladder"	Next → "Heartbreak Hotel"
- The Simpsons season 30

"Bart's Not Dead" is the thirtieth season premiere and 640th episode overall of the American animated television series The Simpsons. It aired in the United States on Fox on September 30, 2018. The episode was directed by Bob Anderson and written by Stephanie Gillis.

In this episode, Bart fakes a miracle and is approached by a Christian filmmaker who wants to make an adaptation of the event, but is wracked with guilt at having lied. Dave Attell, Emily Deschanel, Gal Gadot, Jonathan Groff, and Pete Holmes guest starred. The episode received positive reviews. Writer Stephanie Gillis won the Writers Guild of America Award for Television: Animation for her script to this episode.

== Plot ==
Lisa is playing the saxophone at a school assembly when Bart is dared by Jimbo, Dolph and Kearney to pull the fire alarm, but he declines, not wanting to ruin Lisa's performance. The following day, Marge is proud of him, but Homer and Grampa tell him to take a dare like a man. At Echo Canyon, Nelson, Jimbo, Dolph and Kearney all dare him to jump off the dam. He accepts and does the dare but ends up landing face first on a concrete ledge.

At Springfield General Hospital, Bart wakes up and in order to not disappoint Marge, lies that he saw Heaven. Despite Lisa's warnings, Bart keeps lying about what Heaven is like and becomes popular. A trio of Christian movie producers come to the house, wishing to make a movie about his experience and Bart forces Homer and Ned Flanders to work together on the movie, including holding hands and conditions that Homer will not enjoy. To cast the movie, they interview Emily Deschanel to play Marge, and Gal Gadot for the role of Lisa.

The movie starts filming, but Bart's guilt mounts and he starts having nightmares. He ends up in Heaven in a nightmare, where Grandpa Bouvier scolds him and Jesus Christ beats him up. The movie, Bart's Not Dead, finally premieres, including a group song, "One More Chance".

At home, Bart confesses about lying, to which Homer feigns surprise. Just as Marge is absorbing the news, Lisa announces the movie is a hit, having made over $100 million at the box office. Marge insists they have to confess, and at a press conference, Homer and Ned give the profits to charity and all is forgiven following a passionate speech by Homer. At night, Lisa consoles Bart by joining him on the house roof. Some shingles come loose, and they both fall to the ground, but land in a pile of leaves swept by Homer, which they attribute as the true miracle.

Several years later, Bart arrives in Heaven and meets Homer, who encourages him to meet with Jesus before, due to finding Heaven incredibly boring, he flees to Hindu Heaven to ask Krishna to send him back to Earth. Homer is offered the choice of being reincarnated as a turtle or a pharmaceutical CEO and promptly chooses the turtle.

== Production ==
On her Twitter account, Israeli actress Gal Gadot, who guest starred as herself on this episode, described The Simpsons as "a huge part of my childhood” and also stated that "it's so cool that I get to be a part of the Simpsons." Gadot, who was announced as a guest star in February 2018, did a hamburger handout in this episode which was similar to one she did at the 2018 Academy Awards. There is a brief reference to former President Barack Obama in the scene taking place outside the hospital where there is a sign that says "OBAMACARE IS ALIVE".

== Reception ==
=== Viewing figures ===
"Bart's Not Dead" scored a 1.4 rating with a 5 share and was watched by 3.24 million people, making it Fox's highest rated show of the night.

=== Critical response ===
Dennis Perkins of The A.V. Club gave the episode a B− ranking, stating " 'Bart’s Not Dead', (credited to Stephanie Gillis) aims for a more character-driven return. Sure, Bart, Homer, and Flanders wind up making a Christian-themed movie that winds up making $100 million, but the heart of the episode is, well, heart.”

Jesse Schedeen of IGN gave the episode a 7.2 out of 10 points ranking, stating " 'Bart's Not Dead' stands as one of the better season premieres for The Simpsons in recent years, mostly because it settles for telling a clever, amusing story rather than relying on gimmicks. It doesn't take full advantage of its premise, but this episode still delivers some scathing satire of for-profit religious movies and a strong take on Bart's relationships with Homer and Lisa. Hopefully this episode is a sign of things to come for Season 30."

Tony Sokol of Den of Geek gave the episode a 3 out of 5 points ranking, stating " 'Bart's Not Dead' isn't quite a classic episode, but it has all the classical elements. At the center of the piece is a fight over Bart's soul. He may worship the devil in public, but when no one is looking, or in this case when everyone is looking, Bart will always side with his mother and sister. And the Fox network brass because they couldn't have him going entirely over to the dark side. That's Homer territory. The film-within-the-episode skewers the righteous tinkering of facts, while raising the suspense on why Bart and Homer shouldn't get away with this. Bart, played by Jonathan Groff in the Christian film, doth protest too much, and far too specifically. It sounds like the movie is already a whitewashed version of something in need of fresh paint. The episode bodes fairly well for season 30 because, even though The Simpsons has covered this subject a few times, they show they are not going to ease up on casual blasphemy. After thirty years, the series has become the authority. Newer shows are taking on new ground, but The Simpsons are still shooting for something less than redemption. Bart begins the episode as the boy who refused to take a dare and ends it by taking it one step too far, but sadly takes a step backward."

=== Awards and nominations ===
Stephanie Gillis won the Writers Guild of America Award for Outstanding Writing in Animation at the 71st Writers Guild of America Awards for her script to this episode.

== See also ==
- God's Not Dead – The film referenced in the title
- The Boy Who Came Back from Heaven – A 2010 book about a religious hoax
- Heaven Is for Real
- "Dead Bart" – a lost episode creepypasta
