= Bart vs. Itchy & Scratchy =

- The Simpsons episode
- Episode no.: Season 30; Episode 18
- Directed by: Chris Clements
- Written by: Megan Amram
- Production code: YABF10
- Original air date: March 24, 2019

Guest appearances
- Awkwafina as Carmen; Nicole Byer as Erica; Chelsea Peretti as Piper

Episode chronology
← Previous "E My Sports"	Next → "Girl's in the Band"
- The Simpsons season 30

"Bart vs. Itchy & Scratchy" is the eighteenth episode of the thirtieth season of the American animated television series The Simpsons, and the 657th episode overall. The episode was directed by Chris Clements and written by Megan Amram. It aired in the United States on Fox on March 24, 2019.

In the episode, The Itchy & Scratchy Show is rebooted with female versions of the characters. Milhouse leads a group of boys to protest against the new show while Bart secretly joins a feminist protest group who perform acts of vandalism to protest against male-female inequality and the backlash the new Itchy & Scratchy show receives.

Awkwafina, Nicole Byer, and Chelsea Peretti guest starred. The episode was watched by 1.99 million people. Maggie Simpson does not appear in the episode.

== Plot ==
At a convention where Krusty hosts a panel about his show, he announces that Itchy & Scratchy will be rebooted with the characters as females. While Lisa is excited, Bart and his friends express outrage and swear not to watch the show again. Bart hosts a party where the boys purposely do not watch the show. He overhears Lisa recording a reaction video as she watches the show and investigates. He laughs despite himself. When he lies to his friends about watching, Lisa, having recorded his laugh, uploads the video in revenge.

Lisa's video goes viral, and Bart's friends confront him at school. They try to assault him, but he hides in the girls' bathroom where he meets three sixth-grade girls who call themselves "Bossy Riot" and carry out feminist pranks. Bart joins Bossy Riot after improving one of their pranks. The boys name Milhouse their leader who forms the "Boys Rights Association", or BRA, and start pressuring Krusty into reverting the changes to Itchy & Scratchy.

Bart and Bossy Riot carry out pranks aimed at male authority with Bart wearing a purple mask. Their antics make the news. Lisa realizes Bart is part of Bossy Riot after seeing a loose purple yarn string from his shorts. He initially denies it but admits it when she says it destroys her vision of the universe. She accuses him of hiding behind causes he does not believe in to carry out pranks; Bart counters that while Lisa advocates change, she never has the courage to act.

Bossy Riot learns Krusty will restore the male version of Itchy & Scratchy. In retaliation, Bossy Riot plans to destroy the Itchy & Scratchy master tapes on live television. When Bart protests, the girls tie him up and escape before Lisa finds him.

They go to Krusty's studios where the girls are about to drop the tapes into a vat of nail polish remover. While Bart tries to reason with them, Lisa knocks the vat away. The nail polish remover floods the studio, and the fumes cause the members of BRA to break into tears. Lisa's actions impress Bossy Riot, while BRA blame Milhouse for their humiliation. Lisa joins Bossy Riot while Bart agrees not to fight for causes he does not believe in. He gives Lisa his purple mask while he spray-paints a feminist message on a wall.

Later, Bart makes peace with his friends.

== Production ==
This is the first episode of the series written by Megan Amram. Awkwafina, Nicole Byer, and Chelsea Peretti guest starred as the members of Bossy Riot.

== Cultural references ==
Bossy Riot is a spoof of Russian feminist protest punk rock and performance art group Pussy Riot.

The Runaways song "Cherry Bomb" plays during the montage of Bossy Riot’s pranks.

The Moby song "Extreme Ways" plays at the end of the episode.

== Reception ==
"Bart vs. Itchy & Scratchy" scored a 0.8 rating with a 4 share and was watched by 1.99 million people.

Dennis Perkins of The A.V. Club gave the episode a B stating,

And if Bossy Riot's prankish crime spree (‘Eve was framed’ reads the doctored sign at the First Church Of Springfield) is depicted here as the half-formed eruption of the very real resentment engendered by the girls’ cultural awakening, ‘Bart Vs. Itchy & Scratchy’ bestows its ultimate approval in the quietly rousing finale. Lisa, despite rejecting Bossy Riot's rash plot to destroy the (unbacked-up) Itchy & Scratchy master tapes, makes the decision to don Bart's knit cap and pedal off with the big girls on their own wobbling but righteous crusade. (Lisa's genuinely trepidatious inner doubts about ‘pushing my beliefs further than they've ever gone’ before hopping on her bike is just the Lisa-Amram moment I was hoping for.) And Bart, weaned from his newfound comradeship by the revelation that he was ‘just kept around for fingerprints and DNA,’ yet whips out his pink spray paint and scrawls ‘The patriarchy is a wiener’ on a nearby wall. As Lisa correctly surmised, Bart was acting merely as a ‘mercenary in someone else's war,’ but the episode finds a lovely, hopeful, and sweetly subversive way to show that both Bart and Lisa learned something important, even in a trifling pop cultural stunt.

Tony Sokol of Den of Geek gave the episode a 4 out of 5 points stating,

The Simpsons 'Bart vs. Itchy & Scratchy' is a formidable and forward thinking entry for the season. This season has consistently rewarded what might be universally accepted bad behavior. Tonight's main activity is vandalism. Bart doesn't admit being in Bossy Riot to his sister because she would in any way be happy or admire him for it. He does because she says knowing her brother is doing something she respects would destroy her entire vision of the universe. The episode skewers expectations. Every turn happens because of something somehow taboo, like laughing inappropriately, or admitting to the boys' club that girls don't envy them.

Sokol later named the episode the fifth-best episode of the series from the 2010s.
