= Stephanie Gillis =

Television writer

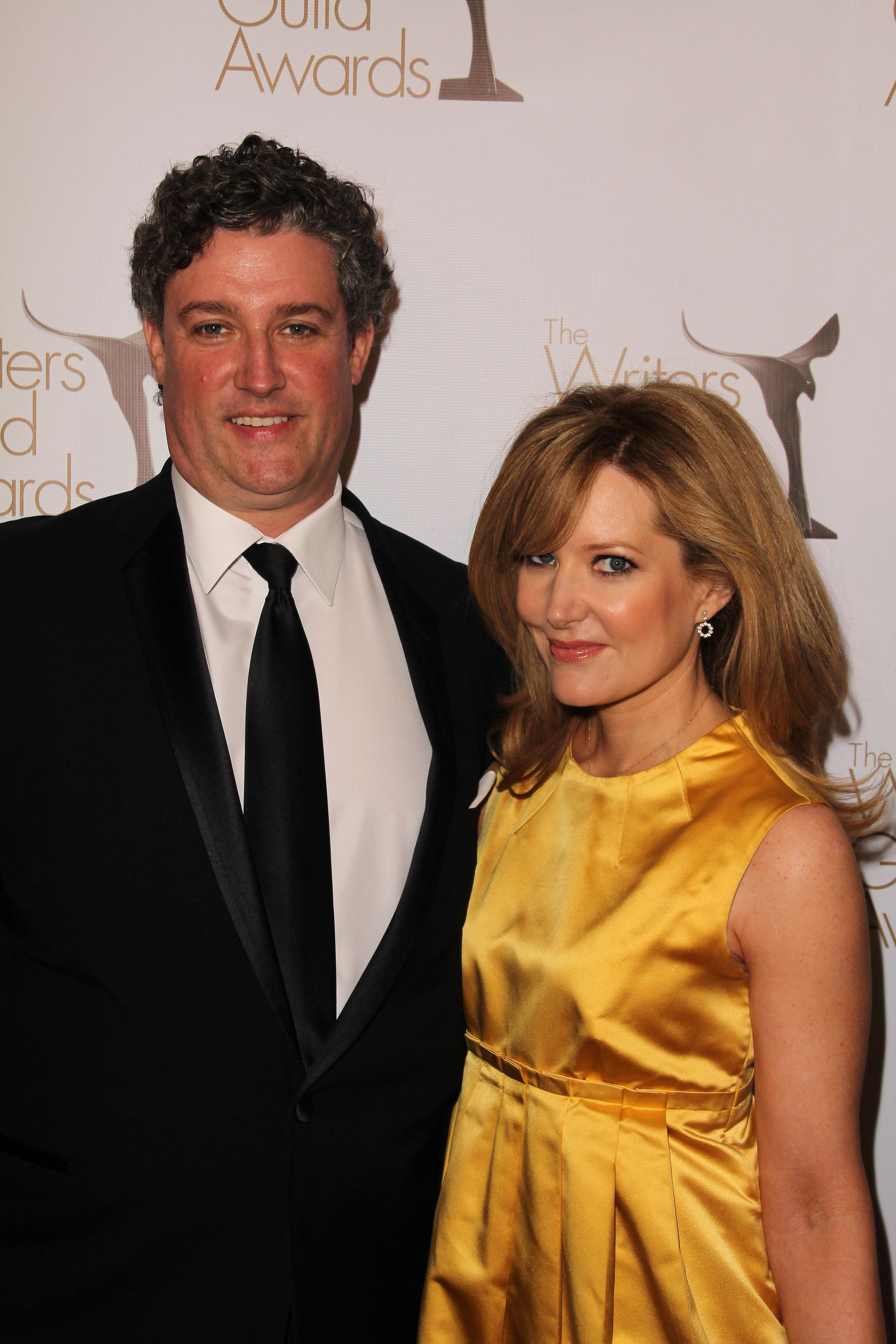
- Gillis and Al Jean in 2013
- Born: Wooster, Ohio
- Education: Barnard College (BA)
- Occupation: Television writer
- Known for: Work on The Simpsons
- Spouse: Al Jean (m. 2002)
- Children: 2

Stephanie Gillis is an American television writer. She writes for The Simpsons and has written 11 episodes.

Gillis lives in Los Angeles, California, with her husband, fellow The Simpsons writer Al Jean. She is a graduate of Barnard College.

== The Simpsons episodes written ==
- "See Homer Run" (2005)
- "Midnight Towboy" (2007)
- "The Burns and the Bees" (2008)
- "Once Upon a Time in Springfield" (2010)
- "Moe Letter Blues" (2010)
- "Replaceable You" (2011)
- "A Tree Grows in Springfield" (2012)
- "Homerland" (2013)
- "Treehouse of Horror XXV" (2014)
- "Lisa with an 'S'" (2015)
- "Bart's Not Dead" (2018)

== Awards and nominations ==
Gillis has received two Emmy Award nominations, five Writers Guild of America Award nominations, an Environmental Media Award nomination, two Annie Award nominations and won the 2015 Annie Award for "Best Animated Television/Broadcast Production".

Gillis wrote the critically acclaimed 2018 Season 30 premiere episode "Bart's Not Dead". Jesse Schedeen of IGN wrote the show delivered "scathing satire" and Kevin Yeoman of Screenrant remarked that the episode recaptured "the essence of the show's genius earlier seasons." Gillis won the Writers Guild of America Award for Outstanding Writing in Animation at the 71st Writers Guild of America Awards for "Bart's Not Dead".

She was nominated for the Writers Guild of America Award in 2006 for "See Homer Run", in 2009 as a member of The Simpsons staff, in 2010 for "The Burns and the Bees" in 2011 for "Moe Letter Blues" and in 2019 for "Bart's Not Dead".

In 2009, Gillis was nominated for an Environmental Media Award for the episode "The Burns and the Bees".

She was nominated for an Emmy in 2010 for the episode "Once Upon a Time in Springfield". Actress Anne Hathaway received an Emmy for Outstanding Voiceover for her performance in "Once Upon a Time in Springfield".

In 2013, Gillis was nominated for an Annie Award for the episode "A Tree Grows in Springfield" and was the winner of the Sierre / DreamAgo Villa Ruffieux Residency Award for her screenplay "Margret and Stevie".

Gillis' "Treehouse of Horror XXV" episode won the top TV honor at the 2015 Annie Awards for "Best Animated Television/Broadcast Production".

In July 2015, Gillis received an Emmy nomination for "Outstanding Animated Program" for her "Treehouse of Horror XXV" episode.
