= Carmen González (singer) =

Ecuadorian singer and songwriter

Carmen González is an Ecuadorian singer and songwriter. She is the lead singer for Koral y Esmeralda. The album Caramba was a tribute to Ecuador's Afro-Ecuadorian musical heritage.

== See also ==
- Afro-Ecuadorian music
