= Sacrebleu =

French expression

Sacrebleu or sacre bleu is a French expression used as a cry of surprise, irritation or displeasure. It is a minced oath form of sacré Dieu (holy God), which is considered profane by some religions due to one of the Ten Commandments in the Bible, which reads "Thou shalt not take the name of the Lord thy God in vain."

== Usage ==
The expression today is not used in France. In the English-speaking world, it is well known, perhaps from Agatha Christie's books about the fictional Belgian detective Hercule Poirot, and the Disney movies The Aristocats, The Rescuers, The Little Mermaid and Beauty and the Beast which feature French characters that use the expression. The expression is used in the 1993 song "Black No. 1 (Little Miss Scare-All)" by the gothic metal band Type O Negative.

== Origin ==
The phrase originated from the words sacré Dieu. At varying points in history this was considered to be taking God's name in vain, which is forbidden in the Ten Commandments. It was then changed to bleu (blue) which rhymes with Dieu.

Other sources propose it coming from old blasphemous curses relating to God, used from the late Middle-Age (some are attested as early as the 11th century) to the 14th (at the latest), with many variants: morbleu or mordieu, corbleu, palsambleu, jarnidieu, tudieu, respectively standing for mort [de] Dieu (God's death), corps [de] Dieu (God's body), par le sang [de] Dieu (by God's blood, the two latter possibly referring to the Eucharistic bread and wine), je renie Dieu (I deny God), tue Dieu (kill God) ... Those curses may be compared to the archaic English [God']sdeath, sblood, struth or zounds (God's wounds). They were considered so offensive that Dieu was sublimated into the similar-sounding neutral syllable bleu. The verb sacrer has several meanings, including to crown, to anoint, to name someone [champion, best actor, etc.], and in the past, rarely in France but more common in French Canada, of swear, curse. Therefore, sacrebleu could be in modern French Je jure par Dieu and in English I curse by God, or the more common I swear to God.
