= La Caramba =

18th-century Spanish singer

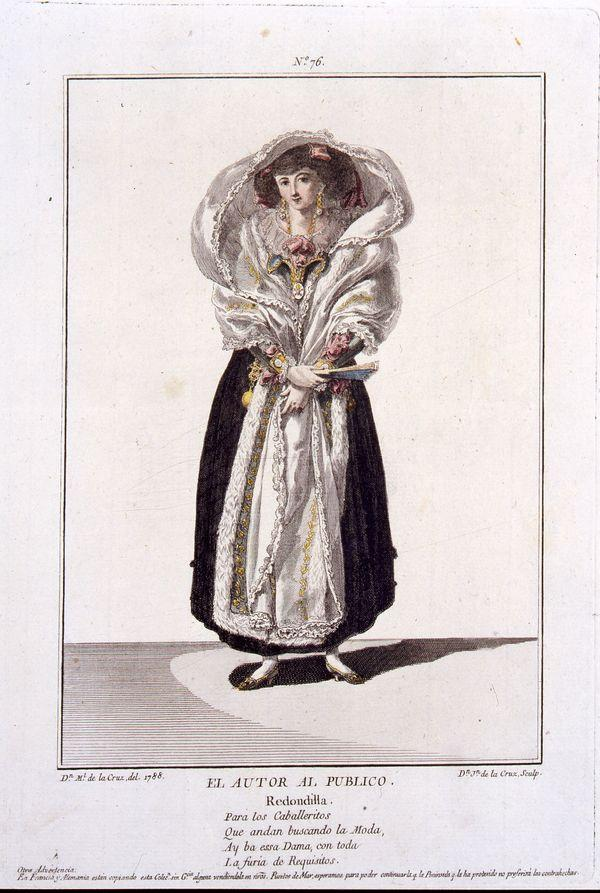
Portrait of María Antonia Vallejo Fernández, "La Caramba", 1788.

María Antonia Vallejo Fernández (9 March 1751 – 10 June 1787), also known as La Caramba, was a Spanish singer and dancer of tonadilla music.

== Biography ==
María was born on 9 March 1751 to Bernardo Vallejo and María Manuela Fernández. She left home in 1776 to pursue her career in Madrid. At Easter of that year she debuted at the Coliseo de la Cruz in Manuel Martínez's company.

She was known as La Caramba after the exclamation ¡caramba! which concluded a tonadilla which she performed soon after her arrival in Madrid. Her costume featured a topknot of brightly coloured ribbons which became known as a caramba too. She married in 1781 but soon left her husband and returned to performing.

In 1784 she retired from the stage for unknown reasons, and died on 10 June 1787 at age 36.
