= Lisa with an 'S' =

- The Simpsons episode
- Episode no.: Season 27; Episode 7
- Directed by: Bob Anderson
- Written by: Stephanie Gillis
- Production code: TABF20
- Original air date: November 22, 2015

Episode features
- Couch gag: During the parody of Star Trek, all the couches surround the donut Starship Enterprise and destroy it after the Simpson family in it destroys their couch.

Episode chronology
← Previous "Friend with Benefit"	Next → "Paths of Glory"
- The Simpsons season 27

"Lisa with an 'S'" is the seventh episode of the twenty-seventh season of the American animated television series The Simpsons, and the 581st episode of the series overall. The episode was directed by Bob Anderson and written by Stephanie Gillis. It aired in the United States on Fox on November 22, 2015.

In this episode, a Broadway star brings Lisa to New York to perform with her while Homer and Marge worry for her well-being. The episode received mixed reviews.

This marks the final episode to credit Sam Simon as executive producer until "Lisa the Veterinarian."

== Plot ==
On his way out to play poker at Moe's with Lenny and Carl, Homer promises Lisa that if he wins, he will pay for her to attend an elite band camp she has been accepted to, that he alleges is the best band camp on their side of the Mississippi River (which side they are talking about is left unspecified). But Homer fails on a full house and ends up losing $5,000 to Broadway legend Laney Fontaine, who is now dating Moe because he has a liquor license. Trying to convince Laney to give his money back, he invites her to dinner to show her how miserable they are. Lisa asks her to sing a song while she plays the saxophone, making Laney realize that Lisa has a lot of talent and could become a famous showbiz kid. She offers to clear the debt if she can take Lisa to New York City for a month to perform on her Broadway shows. Marge is reluctant but agrees after Grampa says this may be the only opportunity for Lisa to live her dreams.

In New York, after meeting Lisa's former ballet teacher Chazz Busby, Lisa easily passes the audition and gets cast in one of the Broadway shows. Later, during a Skype conversation, Marge believes that Lisa is not in a good place and decides to take the family to New York to get her back. On their way there, the family encounters Ned Flanders' Amish cousin Jacob in Pennsylvania and learn that Ned is now considered "ultra liberal" and a black sheep because he lives in the modern world. In New York, the Simpsons and even Marge realize that Lisa fits right into the Broadway show world and they decide to go back to Springfield without her. Laney sees Marge's sacrifice and, having a change of heart, immediately kicks Lisa out of the show on the grounds that Lisa got more cheers than her, leaving Lisa free to return home with the Simpsons.

The episode ends with Homer taking Jacob to Ned's house where Jacob makes Ned realize that he is guilty of pride. Both cousins reconcile by hugging Homer, much to his annoyance.

== Production ==
Tress MacNeille reprised her role as Laney Fontaine, who originally appeared in the twenty-sixth season episode "My Fare Lady." The character is an homage to actress Elaine Stritch.

Approximately midway through the episode, a sign with "Lafayette: The Musical" is shown with a variation of the peace symbol containing the Eiffel Tower. The symbol was created by designer Jean Jullien in the aftermath of the November 2015 Paris attacks, which occurred nine days earlier.

== Cultural references ==
During the poker game, the view inside Homer's head is a parody of the 2015 film Inside Out. Lisa asks Fontaine to read her the novel Anne of Green Gables.

Homer, Moe, Lenny, Carl and Barney start the episode by singing a parody of "Tonight" from West Side Story.

== Reception ==
"Lisa with an 'S'" scored a 2.3 rating and was watched by 5.64 million viewers, making the episode Fox's highest rated show of the night.

Dennis Perkins of The A.V. Club gave the episode a C+ saying, "Could this heap of half-realized plots coalesce into a satisfying episode of The Simpsons? Sure—if any of them were funny on its own, or if they all somehow tied together in the end. Instead, 'Lisa With An "S"' just sort of exists, the final description of a lot of latter-day episodes (although there have also been a couple of genuinely great episodes this season). It wasn’t abysmal or infuriating—at least that would leave something to talk about. This episode was just ... there."

Tony Sokol of Den of Geek gave the episode 4 out of 5 stars. He stated that the episode was well paced with plenty of jokes. He also highlighted Tress MacNeille's Laney Fontaine character as a homage to Elaine Stritch.
