= Uncut Femmes =

- The Simpsons episode
- Episode no.: Season 32; Episode 17
- Directed by: Chris Clements
- Written by: Christine Nangle
- Production code: QABF10
- Original air date: March 28, 2021

Guest appearances
- Joe Mantegna as Fat Tony; Megan Mullally as Sarah Wiggum; Nick Offerman as Captain Bowditch; Natasha Rothwell as Bette; Bob Seger as himself; Tiya Sircar as Erin

Episode chronology
← Previous "Manger Things"	Next → "Burger Kings"
- The Simpsons season 32

"Uncut Femmes" is the seventeenth episode of the thirty-second season of the American animated television series The Simpsons, and the 701st episode overall. It aired in the United States on Fox on March 28, 2021. The episode was directed by Chris Clements, and written by Christine Nangle.

In this episode, Marge participates in a jewel heist, and Chief Wiggum's wife Sarah receives a retcon and voice change for this episode as being an ex-criminal prostitute. Nick Offerman, Natasha Rothwell, and Tiya Sircar guest starred. Musician Bob Seger appeared as himself. The episode was watched live in the United States by 1.22 million viewers and received mixed reviews.

== Plot ==
After discovering something terrible in the nuclear power plant, Waylon Smithers bribes Carl to keep what he has found quiet by giving him tickets to a Bob Seger concert. He invites Homer to join him, and he leaves Marge to chaperone a field trip on a World War II battleship, to her dismay.

At the field trip, Marge pairs up with the seemingly-boring Sarah Wiggum. After the latter tricks the children into going to bed early, Marge realizes that Sarah is not who she seems and is hiding her mean-spirited and boisterous personality from the other mothers. The two are soon kidnapped after spending all night together, and Marge and Sarah find themselves in the lair of two women that Sarah used to partner with in criminal activity; Sarah was the team's "honeypot" who seduced men to distract them from their heists.

The other burglars, Erin and Bette, explain how, while they and Sarah were heisting a museum where Chief Clancy Wiggum was on duty, the fourth member of their team - Lindsay Naegle - betrayed them and had them arrested. However, Sarah was spared the fate due to falling in love and having slept with Wiggum. The women plot to steal the Hourglass Diamond from Naegle, who is attending the prestigious Gen Gala. Marge turns out to be useful in the planning, pointing out that most of the entrances will be blocked by celebrities, fans and the paparazzi; also suggesting they will need stylish costumes to blend in. Impressed, they recruit her for the heist.

Meanwhile, Homer and Wiggum run into each other at the concert, where Seger scolds them for breaking their promises to their wives. Feeling remorseful, they return to the battleship only to learn of the kidnapping, with Ralph as the sole witness. Wiggum and Homer confront Fat Tony, accusing him of kidnapping their wives, but he denies doing so and also suggests that the two's disappearance may have something to do with their husbands' selfishness and absentmindedness. Leaving Ralph in Fat Tony's temporary care, Wiggum and Homer search for their wives while realizing that they do not know them very well, but then see Marge and Sarah attending the gala on TV.

The four women execute the heist perfectly until Naegle realizes she has been robbed and calls the police. As Marge and Sarah attempt to flee, Homer and Wiggum call out to their wives via a megaphone to apologize. Attempting to stop Wiggum from yelling her name, Sarah tackles him to the ground, thus revealing her real personality to a surprised Wiggum. While attempting to stop Marge and Sarah herself, Naegle falls down the stairs and is exposed by Erin and Bette for stealing other women's jewelry and is arrested. This allows Marge and Sarah to escape publicly with the jewel, much to the surprise of Patty and Selma, and their friends who are watching the gala back at the Simpson house.

During the credits, Wiggum and Sarah have sex at the gala after she tells him the full history of her past. Wiggum then realizes that he forgot about Ralph, who is still bonding with Fat Tony in father-son activities.

== Production ==
=== Casting ===
Nick Offerman reprised his role as Captain Bowditch. Offerman first appeared in this role in the twenty-sixth season episode "The Wreck of the Relationship." His wife, Megan Mullally, guest stars as Sarah Wiggum. Sarah Wiggum is normally played by Pamela Hayden. Musician Bob Seger appeared as himself. Seger stated that he was a fan of the show.

In addition, Tony Rodriguez began voicing Julio in this episode after his singing voice was previously done by Mario Jose in the episode "Diary Queen" earlier this season A supercut of LGBTQ jokes on The Simpsons, which featured Julio, was posted by Drew Mackie, host of the podcast Gayest Episode Ever, in January 2021. Rodriguez, a frequent guest of the podcast, posted his own video in February to be cast as Julio. Executive producer Matt Selman saw both videos, and Rodriguez was recommended by Christine Nangle, who wrote this episode and was Rodriguez's partner at Upright Citizens Brigade. Hank Azaria, who previously voiced Julio, had already recorded his lines for the episode, so Rodriguez could only record over his lines but would be allowed to perform with more freedom in future episodes.

Also, Dawnn Lewis becomes the new voice of Bernice Hibbert.

== Reception ==
=== Viewing figures ===
In the United States, the episode was watched live by 1.22 million viewers.

=== Critical response ===
Tony Sokol with Den of Geek said, "'Uncut Femmes' is a fun and playful movie satire. It captures the suspense, romance, glamour and pace of a heist film, but puts The Simpsons touch on it. Marge shines in the unexpected, manages to clean house at the same time, and brings Homer into an understanding. The crooks get away with it, and nothing will change. Like so many crimes in Springfield, it's got Chief Wiggum on the case, and that's like having no one at all." He also gave the episode four out of five stars.

Jesse Bereta of Bubbleblabber gave the episode an 8 out of 10. He praised the performance of Megan Mullally as Sarah Wiggum. He also highlighted the relationship between Ralph and Fat Tony.

Matt Selman claimed Sarah had "no personality" before the episode, referring to her as a "She-Wiggum".
