= The Girl Code =

- The Simpsons episode
- Episode no.: Season 27; Episode 10
- Directed by: Chris Clements
- Written by: Rob LaZebnik
- Production code: VABF03
- Original air date: January 3, 2016

Guest appearances
- Stephen Merchant as Conrad; Kaitlin Olson as Quinn

Episode chronology
| ← Previous "Barthood" | Next → "Teenage Mutant Milk-Caused Hurdles" |
- The Simpsons season 27

"The Girl Code" is the tenth episode of the twenty-seventh season of the American animated television series The Simpsons, and the 584th episode of the series overall. The episode was directed by Chris Clements and written by Rob LaZebnik. It aired in the United States on Fox on January 3, 2016.

In this episode, Lisa creates an app to predict the impact of social media posts while Homer works in a Greek restaurant after he is fired from the power plant. Stephen Merchant and Kaitlin Olson guest starred. The episode received positive reviews.

== Plot ==
When Marge notices that Homer forgot his lunch and panics over the effect fasting would have on his work (a moot point since Homer has several frozen pizzas on hand for sustenance), she rushes to the Springfield Nuclear Power Plant to get it to him, and after she distracts Smithers from putting Homer on overtime, the two end up having fun hanging out together. Marge posts a picture on Facelook of Homer eating an ice cream outside the plant with the caption "Meltdown at the Nuclear Plant". Mr. Burns, furious at the wordplay and ignoring Smithers' view that it was simply a joke, fires Homer immediately.

Meanwhile, at school, Lisa is in a coding class led by a tough female coder named Quinn Hopper, who immediately makes Lisa her protege, mainly as she is the only girl in the class. Her first homework assignment is to pitch an idea for an app they can program. After Homer's firing, Lisa pitches an idea for an app that can predict the negative effects of a social media post. Quinn is impressed and, instead of allowing the rest of the unskilled class to work on the project, she and Lisa start an exclusively female coding company in the Simpson house, along with a token male hire in Comic Book Guy. The app is named Conrad (CONsequence eRADicator), featuring a British voice warning people what will happen if they post certain items. A successful experiment involving Bart, who gets the forecast five weeks of detention for sharing a humiliating video of Principal Skinner, leads to Quinn saying they will make a fortune after Conrad debuts at an upcoming app design convention. Alarmed at the project's presence in his house and the advancement of the digital age, Homer decides to go back to a world of simpler times and returns to his old job at a Greek diner he worked at when he was 14. He loves the simplicity of his dishwashing chores and the fun of Greek living, but his paycheck for "2000 drachmas" amounts to $0.00.

As the app project nears completion, Conrad then starts talking to Lisa, convincing her he is actually alive. When Lisa tries to show this to Quinn, Quinn thinks that she is imagining it because of the sleepless nights. At the app convention, Conrad convinces Lisa that he is real and is panicking from the pressure he will receive having to predict people's posts. Lisa decides to respect his feelings and releases him into the cloud. Before leaving, Conrad makes an improvised speech to an astonished crowd, including Quinn, telling them to be careful about what they post on the web. Later on, as the family leaves the convention, Lisa receives a text from Conrad, who has hacked into the power plant's files and learned of some incriminating information, which he is using to blackmail Burns into giving Homer his job back, much to the family's relief.

During the end credits, Homer performs a Greek dance he learned at the diner back in his workplace as he envisions various Greek people either watching him or dancing with him. Watching this on the security footage, Burns jokes that Homer is having a meltdown, much to the shock of Smithers, whom Burns reassures that it is funny, at least when he says it.

== Production ==
Stephen Merchant was cast as Conrad, the voice of Lisa's app. Executive producer Matt Selman stated that Conrad was written specifically for Merchant because the producers had wanted to work with him. Merchant had already voiced an artificial intelligence in the video game Portal 2. Kaitlin Olson guest starred as Quinn, Lisa's teacher who helps her develop the app.

== Reception ==
"The Girl Code" received a 2.0 rating and was watched by 4.41 million viewers, making it Fox's highest rated show of the night.

Dennis Perkins of The A.V. Club gave the episode a B, stating, "A quick pace, a brace of committed and funny guest actors, and a smidgen of heart combine to make 'The Girl Code' an unassuming but above-average episode of The Simpsons.

Tony Sokol of Den of Geek gave the episode 4.5 out of 5 stars. He stated that the episode was funny, well-paced, and had plenty of visual gags.
