= Barthood =

- The Simpsons episode
- Promotional image and opening of the episode, parodying the opening of Boyhood
- Episode no.: Season 27; Episode 9
- Directed by: Rob Oliver
- Written by: Dan Greaney
- Production code: VABF02
- Original air date: December 13, 2015

Episode features
- Couch gag: Homer, Marge and Bart complain about the animation in the gag. Lisa tells them it is called rotoscoping and uses the TV remote to change back to the show's usual animation.

Episode chronology
← Previous "Paths of Glory"	Next → "The Girl Code"
- The Simpsons season 27

"Barthood" is the ninth episode of the twenty-seventh season of the American animated television series The Simpsons, and the 583rd episode of the series overall. The episode was directed by Rob Oliver and written by Dan Greaney. It aired in the United States on Fox on December 13, 2015. The episode parodies the 2014 film Boyhood.

In this episode, Bart feels overshadowed by Lisa as he grows up until she tells him where his talent lies. The episode received positive reviews.

== Plot ==
Homer and a six-year-old Bart are lying on the grass. Bart asks questions about nature, but Homer asks why he indirectly caused his fall onto the grass. Marge takes Bart to Grampa while Homer heals. Grampa allows Bart to drive his car.

Two years later, Professor Frink unsuccessfully teaches Bart reading while Lisa, two years younger, can read well. Marge displays Lisa's painting while Bart draws on the entire kitchen. While Homer restores it, Bart tries to impress Lisa by driving Homer's car but crashes it through the kitchen. A psychologist says Bart misbehaves because of Homer's lack of attention and suggests they go camping. Instead, Homer takes him to an inn. Lisa is named student of the month in her first month while Bart has achieved nothing. Homer says he loves them both equally but ignores a bumper sticker Bart makes for Homer's car.

On Bart's 12th birthday, Lisa becomes student of the month for 48 consecutive months. Bart gets angry because his sister overshadows him. He and Milhouse skateboard and break streetlamps. Milhouse gets arrested while Bart hides with Grampa who gives him a BMX.

Three years later, Bart performs stunts on his bicycle. Marge and Lisa leave for a summer camp. Bart throws a party where Homer gets high and reveals he was like Bart until he was born. They hug, but Homer is glad Bart will not amount to anything. When Bart competes in a BMX competition, he is knocked unconscious and is revived by Lisa, who is proclaimed a hero, making him angry.

Three years later, Bart makes caricatures and attends Milhouse's graduation party. Lisa is graduating with them. Milhouse's parents fight, so Lisa makes him feel better. Milhouse says she is the best thing at the party. Bart gets irate that he is always second-best. Lisa tires of him blaming her for his setbacks. She says he is a good artist but does nothing with his talent. Bart takes his sister's rage as advice.

Years later, Bart opens a bicycle modification shop, and Nelson and Lisa, who are dating, visit him. He shows them a mural depicting his life. Lisa realizes she is not on it. Bart lowers one of the shop's doors, and Lisa sees a mural made in her homage. On the lawn, Homer answers adult Bart's questions and advises him to pretend to be on the phone to avoid awkward situations.

== Production ==
Executive producer Al Jean stated that the hockey players mentioned in the episode were named after a Calgary couple who had remodeled their kitchen to look like the Simpson family's kitchen. Nancy Cartwright had previously acknowledged the project on Twitter. However, Jean said the line from Milhouse about his imaginary girlfriend living in Alberta and named Alberta was a coincidence.

== Cultural references ==
The episode is a parody of Richard Linklater's 2014 film Boyhood. Linklater's films Waking Life and A Scanner Darkly were rotoscoped as was the couch gag of this episode.

== Reception ==
=== Viewing figures ===
The episode received a 2.4 rating and was watched by 5.97 million viewers, making it Fox's highest rated show of the night.

=== Critical response ===
Dennis Perkins of The A.V. Club gave the episode a C saying, "While this Boyhood-inspired episode of The Simpsons apes the storytelling gimmick of Richard Linklater’s coming-of-age film, it misses the point almost completely. Instead of using the time-lapse structure to lend new insight into Bart Simpson’s mind, Dan Greaney’s script just rehashes the show’s same old character beats and jokes with different haircuts. As missed opportunities go, ‘Barthood’ is especially disheartening."

Tony Sokol of Den of Geek rated the episode a 4 out of 5, saying that the episode "was well made and intelligent, poignant and funny, but it was a muted episode overall. Generally, The Simpsons use film parody as a springboard to lunacy, but sometimes they are a little too reverential. They remained faithful to the style and feel of the original and used it to forward the characterizations. But as in most Simpsons-of-the-future episodes, they contradict and will one day be contradicted. This was an inspired episode that stayed on the safe side. Wait, I have to take a call." In 2023, Sokol named this episode the best episode of The Simpsons from the 2010s.

Screen Rant called it the best episode of the 27th season.

=== Awards and nominations ===
Writer Dan Greaney was nominated for a Writers Guild of America Award for Outstanding Writing in Animation at the 69th Writers Guild of America Awards for his script to this episode.

The episode was nominated for the Annie Award for Best General Audience Animated Television Broadcast Production at the 44th Annie Awards. Greaney was also nominated for the Annie Award for Outstanding Achievement for Writing in an Animated Television/Broadcast Production at the same awards ceremony.
