= Much Apu About Something =

- The Simpsons episode
- Episode no.: Season 27; Episode 12
- Directed by: Bob Anderson
- Written by: Michael Price
- Production code: VABF05
- Original air date: January 17, 2016

Guest appearance
- Utkarsh Ambudkar as Jamshed "Jay" Nahasapeemapetilon

Episode chronology
← Previous "Teenage Mutant Milk-Caused Hurdles"	Next → "Love Is in the N_{2}-O_{2}-Ar-CO_{2}-Ne-He-CH_{4}"
- The Simpsons season 27

"Much Apu About Something" is the twelfth episode of the twenty-seventh season of the American animated television series The Simpsons, and the 586th episode of the series overall. The episode was directed by Bob Anderson and written by Michael Price. It aired in the United States on Fox on January 17, 2016.

In this episode, Sanjay's son Jay takes over the Kwik-E-Mart and changes it into a store that sells fresh food. Utkarsh Ambudkar guest starred as Jamshed "Jay" Nahasapeemapetilon. The episode received mixed reviews but drew controversy over trying to address the character of Apu.

== Plot ==
Springfield is having a parade in homage to the city's founder Jebediah Springfield, where they introduce a new statue of him to a very negative reception. During the parade, Bart activates a fire engine's water cannon, soaking Chief Wiggum. As a result, the Springfield Police Department gets into a battle against the volunteer fire department which ends with a SWAT tank losing control and destroying the Kwik-E-Mart, injuring Apu and Sanjay. Homer catches video proof of Bart causing the disaster, and threatens to hand the tape over and send Bart to juvenile detention unless he swears to never pull a prank again. Milhouse tries to bring the old Bart back, but Bart resists dropping a beehive on Superintendent Chalmers' crotch and releasing the handbrake on Principal Skinner's cherry-picker. But Bart ends up doing well at school and noticing that Homer and Marge do not really praise their kids when they do well, resulting in a closer bond with his younger sister Lisa, as now he understands her disappointed past feelings.

At the hospital, Sanjay reveals that he wants to retire from his job at the Kwik-E-Mart and give his share of the store to his son Jamshed "Jay" Nahasapeemapetilon. Six weeks after the incident, Apu returns to the Kwik-E-Mart only to find it renovated into a new store, the Quick & Fresh, a store that sells natural products run by Jay. At the store's restroom, Jay explains that Apu has an addiction to scratching lottery tickets. Because of that, he is the owner of 80% of the store. Jay, who is already angry at his uncle for being a stereotype, eventually fires Apu from his job. Apu is so depressed that he goes to Moe's Tavern, where Moe convinces Homer to turn Bart into a prankster again for him to pull a prank on Jay so Apu can have his store back.

Bart, who reluctantly comes back to his old self Clockwork Orange-style, decides to turn the Quick & Fresh light switch off for thirty seconds; as none of the products have preservatives, everything will deteriorate, scaring the customers away. He is interrupted by Lisa, who reminds him that after he stopped pranking, they love each other even more. Bart misinterprets the expression "unconditional love" as a sign he can do anything he wants and still be loved by his sister, so he cuts the store's power for a few seconds. When he turns the power back on, two massage stones collide, producing a spark that leads to a major fire. As the firefighters used all their water and foam against the police officers on the parade, they have nothing they can extinguish the fire with, and the store is completely destroyed by the flames. Later, Apu apologizes to Jay for the destruction, but he also finds a The Big Bang Theory scratch-off ticket in the middle of the debris. He scratches it and thanks to three images of Sheldon Cooper wins a million dollars — enough money to buy his store back and rebuild the Kwik-E-Mart.

In the final scene, Mayor Quimby plans to have Wiggum use a tank to destroy the Jebediah Springfield statue. Wiggum fires at the statue, only for projectiles to be deflected enough to destroy the tank, much to Quimby and Wiggum's annoyance.

== Production ==
The reintroduction of Jamshed as Jay as Apu's adult nephew was an attempt by the producers to address the controversy surrounding the Apu character. Jamshed was first seen as a child in the fourth season episode "Homer the Heretic."

Utkarsh Ambudkar was cast as Jay. In 2013, Ambudkar stated in an interview that he hated Apu and vowed not to accept parts where he would play a similar role. He thought the episode would be a way for the show to make fun of itself and to say that the character of Apu was anachronistic. However, he thought the end result was saying that the show makes fun of all stereotypes, and viewers should not complain.

== Cultural references ==
The title of the episode is a reference to the 1623 Shakespearean play Much Ado About Nothing. The scratch ticket that Apu plays has a theme of The Big Bang Theory. Bart puts on an eyelash similar to the one worn in the film A Clockwork Orange while Wendy Carlos' score from the film plays in the background.

== Reception ==
"Much Apu About Something" received a 1.8 rating and was watched by 3.95 million viewers, making it Fox's highest rated show of the night.

Dennis Perkins of The A.V. Club gave the episode an A−, saying that episode, "About Apu’s nephew Jamshed (or Jay, as he prefers) turning the Kwik-E-Mart into a health food store, might reference a beloved episode about Apu’s dignity in the face of Springfield’s hairtrigger xenophobia, but it’s equally a referendum on the character of Apu Nahasapeemapetilon himself."

Tony Sokol of Den of Geek gave the episode 2.5 out of 5 stars. He stated that the episode was layers but did not have many strong jokes. He felt the episode was teasing a change but took it back as it usually does.

Emily St. James of Vox stated that the show tried have the criticism of Apu go both ways by arguing that Jay is a stereotype of a hipster millennial. However, unlike Luigi, the Italian chef, or the sea captain, Apu is a much more developed character. Two years later, St. James gave the episode credit for attempting to address the criticism even though the status quo did not change.

In 2018, Dana Schwartz of Entertainment Weekly stated that the producers misunderstood the criticism of Apu in this episode by using the Italian chef to say they made fun of all stereotypes.

Executive producer Al Jean also acknowledged that the attempt to address the controversy was unsatisfactory.
