= Teenage Mutant Milk-Caused Hurdles =

- The Simpsons episode
- Episode no.: Season 27; Episode 11
- Directed by: Timothy Bailey
- Written by: Joel H. Cohen
- Production code: VABF04
- Original air date: January 10, 2016

Guest appearance
- Sofía Vergara as Mrs. Carol Berrera

Episode features
- Couch gag: An homage to Miami Vice, Homer and the couch detectives and fight crime (including Ned Flanders, Sideshow Bob and Snake Jailbird), titled "LA-Z Rider". The sequence ends with the family on the couch watching the trailer, while Maggie drives by on a motorized recliner wearing sunglasses.

Episode chronology
← Previous "The Girl Code"	Next → "Much Apu About Something"
- The Simpsons season 27

"Teenage Mutant Milk-Caused Hurdles" is the eleventh episode of the twenty-seventh season of the American animated television series The Simpsons, and the 585th episode of the series overall. The episode was directed by Timothy Bailey and written by Joel H. Cohen. It aired in the United States on Fox on January 10, 2016.

In this episode, Principal Skinner and Bart both become infatuated with his new teacher while Lisa develops skin problems. Sofía Vergara guest starred as Mrs. Carol Berrera. The episode received mixed reviews.

== Plot ==
At Springfield Elementary, Superintendent Chalmers hires Carol Berrera as substitute teacher for the fourth grade. Bart starts acting weird around her and realizes that he has a crush on his new teacher. Meanwhile, Homer must buy a healthy milk brand for the family, but instead, he buys a cheaper milk full of hormones made by Buzz Cola. The next morning, the family discovers that Bart is the first to wake up and is already dressed. Lisa realizes that Bart is only doing that for his new teacher. Homer drives Bart to school to see her, and they see other dads watching outside her classroom. Later, Bart vandalizes the school's wall, and Berrera asks to see him after class. She tells Bart that he is behind in class and needs a tutor. When Principal Skinner offers to help pull up her maps, Bart and Skinner each realize that they are both trying to impress Berrera.

The milk hormones cause Bart to grow facial hair, Lisa to develop acne, and Maggie to grow a unibrow. Homer teaches Bart to shave his beard. Meanwhile, Marge covers Lisa's skin problems with makeup. At school, Bart pretends he is hurt to draw Berrera's attention. Wearing makeup makes Lisa popular enough to be invited to a third grade party. The next day, Bart sees Berrera and Skinner kissing in the corridor. He also calls Bart for a meeting, saying that he knows more things about Berrera and that he has no chance to win her. Angry at Skinner's move, Bart decides to prank them by filling a chocolate box given to Berrera by Skinner with the class pets.

At the party, Lisa sees rain which would reveal her acne problem, so she decides to take off the makeup in front of everybody first, but her skin is clean. She leaves the party embarrassed for making an underwhelming announcement. She also convinces Bart to let Skinner date Carol. When Skinner presents her to his mother Agnes, Carol gets so disgusted by Agnes that she decides to break up with him. Bart consoles Skinner by roasting marshmallows with him at the school, while Lisa plays saxophone inside.

At breakfast, Lisa is playing saxophone at the kitchen, vowing never to use makeup again, but Bart mocks her. They start fighting, but they are separated by Maggie who now has a huge unibrow and super-strength due to the milk hormones.

== Production ==
The producers reached out to animator Steve Cutts about making a couch gag. The only requirements were that the Simpsons family and the couch needed to appear. He considered creating a gag with a dark tone but felt Banksy and Don Hertzfeldt had created similar ones. He settled on a 1980s theme based on Miami Vice with some references to Saturday morning cartoons from that time.

In August 2015, Entertainment Weekly reported that Sofía Vergara was cast as Bart's new teacher. The producers thought it would be interesting to have Bart and Skinner attracted to the same person. Executive producer Al Jean left the door open for the character to return in future episodes.

== Reception ==
=== Viewing figures ===
"Teenage Mutant Milk-Caused Hurdles" received a 3.6 rating and was watched by 8.33 million viewers, making it Fox's highest rated show of the night.

=== Critical response ===
Dennis Perkins of The A.V. Club gave the episode a B, stating "In the long history of Springfield’s questionable milk products, 'Teenage Mutant Milk-Caused Hurdles’ introduction of Buzz Milk, a hormone-heavy milk-like beverage from the makers of Buzz Cola, might not be up to the comedy standards of malk, or Squeaky Farms Brand Genuine Animal Milk, but the product’s effect of bringing 'precocious puberty' upon Bart and Lisa is also the catalyst for a surprisingly sweet, funny episode. The idea of everyone’s favorite perpetual ten and eight-year-olds getting a patchy ‘stache (Bart) and pimples (Lisa) could have opened the door for a lot of the cynically 'risqué' jokes late-run Simpsons has been known to throw around...Instead, while the episode does suffer from a nondescript guest star and could use more time to fill out Bart and Lisa’s adventures in temporary teenager-dom, Joel H. Cohen’s script makes the kids’ confusion about their new state both character-appropriate and charming."

Tony Sokol of Den of Geek gave the episode 2 out of 5 stars. He felt it was a filler episode with repeats of previous plot points. He thought Vergara's casting indicated a ratings stunt and that the long couch gag meant the episode was not fully fleshed out.
