= Treehouse of Horror XXVI =

- The Simpsons episode
- Promotional poster depicting the three segments of the episode. Top left: "Wanted: Dead, Then Alive"; Top right and center: "Telepaths of Glory"; Bottom: "Homerzilla"
- Episode no.: Season 27; Episode 5
- Directed by: Steven Dean Moore
- Written by: Joel H. Cohen
- Production code: TABF18
- Original air date: October 25, 2015

Guest appearances
- Kelsey Grammer as Sideshow Bob; Chris Wedge as Scrat

Episode features
- Couch gag: A John Kricfalusi-animated couch gag where the Simpson children are trick-or-treating before being set upon by soul-hungry spirits with a monstrous Frank Grimes among them. The spirits chase after the Simpson children to their house with the Frank Grimes monster taking Homer's soul from his body and eating it. Includes an original song titled, "The Soul Candy Song".

Episode chronology
← Previous "Halloween of Horror"	Next → "Friend with Benefit"
- The Simpsons season 27

"Treehouse of Horror XXVI" is the fifth episode of the twenty-seventh season of the American animated television series The Simpsons, the 26th episode in the Treehouse of Horror series of Halloween specials, and the 579th episode of the series overall. The episode was directed by Steven Dean Moore and written by Joel H. Cohen. It originally aired on the Fox network in the United States on October 25, 2015.

The episode, like the other Treehouse of Horror episodes, comprises three self-contained segments. In "Wanted: Dead, Then Alive", Sideshow Bob finally murders Bart; in "Homerzilla", Homer plays the role of Godzilla and his American remake; and in "Telepaths of Glory", Lisa, Milhouse, and Maggie receive telepathic powers. Showrunner Al Jean gave an interview about the episode in the month before it aired. Kelsey Grammer reprises his role as the guest voice of Bob, and the opening musical sequence was animated by John Kricfalusi. This is the first Treehouse of Horror episode or Simpsons Halloween Special to not have that title on screen. The episode's title with Roman numeral appears in promotional materials. The Simpsons series title also does not appear on screen.

"Treehouse of Horror XXVI" was watched by an audience of 6.75 million, the highest on Fox that night. Reception was mixed to negative, with its perceived excess violence and lack of originality being criticized.

== Plot ==
The episode opens with a John Kricfalusi–animated couch gag where the Simpson children are trick-or-treating before being set upon by soul-hungry spirits with a monstrous Frank Grimes among them that skins Bart for his soul before Maggie saves him and Lisa. The spirits chase after the Simpson children to their home, and the Frank Grimes monster takes Homer's soul.

=== Wanted: Dead, Then Alive ===
Bart gets a text message from Milhouse, telling him to come to the music room. When he gets there, he finds Sideshow Bob, who lured him there with Milhouse's phone in order to accomplish his lifelong dream: to kill Bart. Bob kills Bart with a spear gun and takes his body to his house to celebrate his accomplishment. As his main objective in life is done, he decides to complete other dreams, such as becoming a literature teacher at Springfield University, but is dissatisfied as his students are lazy cheaters. He discovers that the only thing that has made him happy was hunting down Bart for 24 years, so he builds a machine to bring Bart back to life so he can kill him over and over. Bob's machine is discovered by Santa's Little Helper, and the Simpson family break into his basement and reanimate Bart. Bob appears with a shotgun and has the legal right to kill the intruding Simpsons. Homer attacks Bob with a lamp, ripping his head off, and Marge decides that Bart can keep Bob's remains. Bart puts Bob's head into the Reanimator with a horn, frog legs, a chicken body, a tail, and a booger, making a bizarre-looking creature.

=== Homerzilla ===
In a parody of Godzilla and the 1998 version, a crazy old Japanese man based on Grampa Simpson is constantly mocked because every day he drops a donut into the ocean. When asked why he does such things, he says that is because if he does not, a huge sea monster will rise and destroy the city. One day, as he is preparing a donut for his "ritual", he chokes on the toppings and dies. With nobody to drop the donuts, a sea monster called Homerzilla (Homer) wakes up and destroys the city. The scene cuts to the present time, where executives are watching the black-and-white Homerzilla film, stating that "it's so cheap, it's funny", so it needs an expensive remake. Two years later, they release Zilla, a total failure. They throw all the merchandising into the ocean, but the containers wake up the real Homerzilla and a message appears reporting that he will return as soon as people have forgotten about the last film.

=== Telepaths of Glory ===
In a parody of Chronicle, Bart, Lisa, and Milhouse are walking through a forest. Bart scares Lisa with dead owls, and she hits Milhouse's nose with the camera, making him lose his balance and fall into a giant hole. Bart and Lisa decide to jump into the hole to rescue him, leaving all three of them stuck inside of it with nuclear waste from the power plant. The radioactive goo explodes, sending them back outside the hole. When they wake up, Milhouse and Lisa discover that they have gained telekinesis, so they decide to use the powers for selfish purposes. Lisa only makes a few changes, but Milhouse goes mad with powers only to be struck by lightning. Lisa says she did not do it, making the family curious to discover who did. The camera pans to reveal that Maggie also has telepathic powers, as she was using a radioactive rod as a pacifier. Maggie then uses her powers to benefit the world, such as turning Homerzilla into a larger Barney the Dinosaur before taking a nap while still floating in the air. The episode ends with Kang and Kodos on their spaceship, with Kang complaining that once again, they only have made a cameo appearance, despite Kodos admonishing him against it; before the show's producers simply crop the video from 16:9 to 4:3, which shocks Kodos. Kang then yells "Just 'cos it looks like season 4 doesn't make it season 4!"

== Production ==
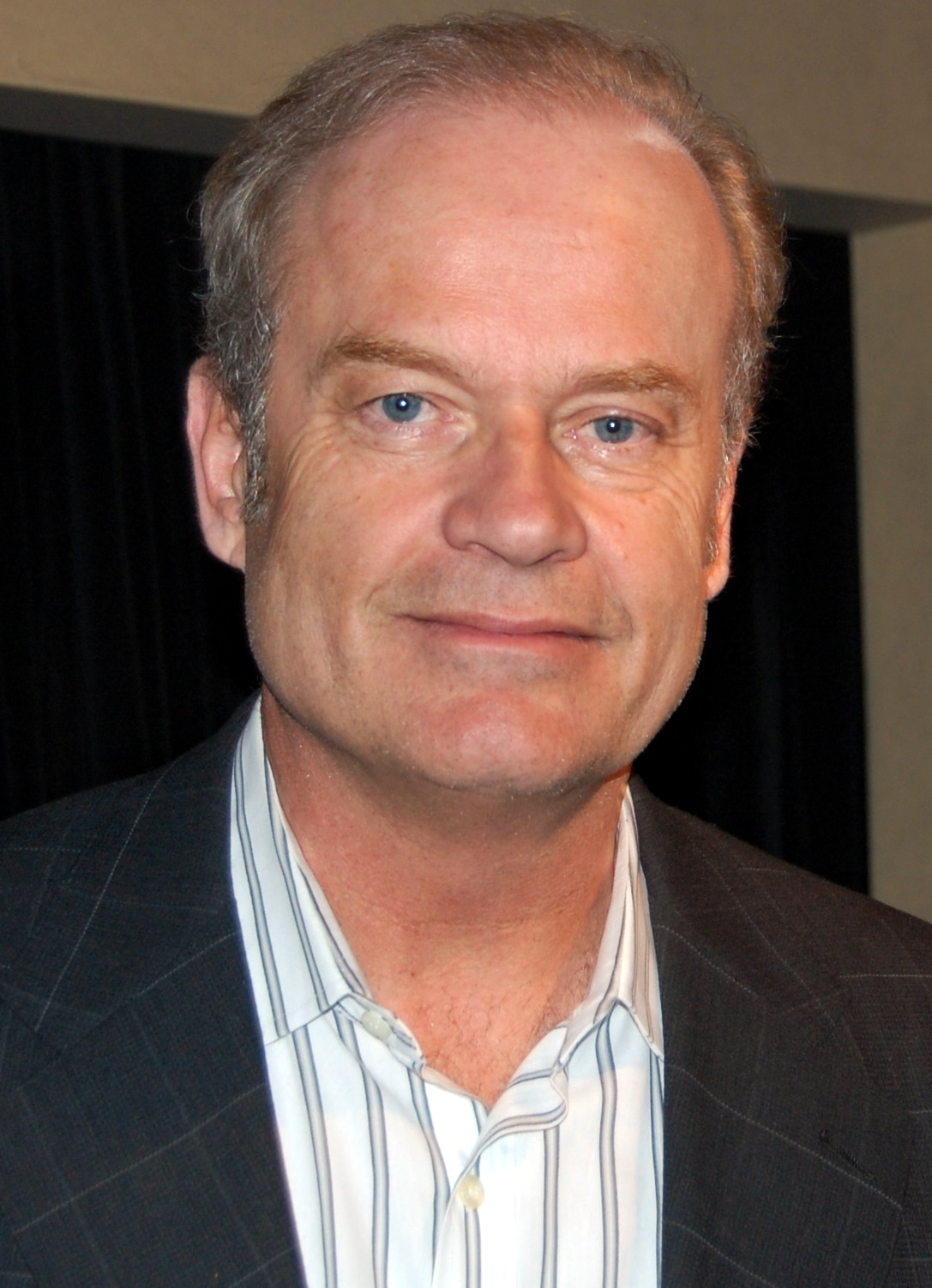
Kelsey Grammer, voice of Sideshow Bob, was excited that his character would finally kill Bart.

In a September 2015 interview with The Hollywood Reporter, Al Jean spoke about the episode, saying: "We're trying to break barriers and it's like nothing we've ever done."

The episode opens with a couch gag animated by Ren & Stimpy creator John Kricfalusi. It begins as a homage to Hanna-Barbera cartoons with the children wearing Huckleberry Hound masks before becoming a Kricfalusi cartoon. The show received clearance from Warner Bros. to include the reference.

The first segment features Sideshow Bob killing Bart Simpson. Jean compared the story to the cartoons featuring Wile E. Coyote and the Road Runner by stating, "I was always the kind of kid that wanted Coyote to eat the Roadrunner, so this made me very happy". He added that Bob's voice actor Kelsey Grammer was excited by the prospect, exclaiming "Oh, finally!" Elvis Costello's 1979 single "Accidents Will Happen" plays as Bob repeatedly murders Bart.

The second segment features parodies of first Godzilla film and subsequent Hollywood remakes. The producers added several Hayao Miyazaki references to it since the segment is an animated sequence featuring Japanese characters. The final segment is parody of the 2012 film Chronicle.

== Reception ==
The episode received a 2.8 rating and was watched by a total of 6.75 million people, making it the most watched show on Fox that night.

The episode received mixed reviews. Dennis Perkins of The A.V. Club gave the episode a B−, calling it "middling". He wrote that the first segment "just goes for the gore" and that there was "not much glee in the dark humor"; though he did praise Bart's death montage and compared it to those of Emperor Joker and its Batman: The Brave and the Bold adaptation, he concluded that the segment "is as repetitive as murdering your arch-enemy again and again and again." He was more favoring towards the satire in "Homerzilla", but concluded that it had "not too much meat on [its] bones", and decried the lack of originality in the final segment, although he approved of Principal Skinner correcting graffiti to call himself a "wiener".

Jesse Schedeen of IGN gave the episode 6.9 out of 10, saying that it "offers a decent lineup of darker Springfield adventures. The standout is the return of Sideshow Bob, a story entertaining enough it really deserved its own, full-length episode. "Homerzilla" also has its moments. And while the lack of originality in "Telepaths of Glory" is disappointing, as a whole this episode is entertaining enough to fall comfortably in the middle of the pack as far as "Treehouse of Horror" episodes go."

Tony Sokol of Den of Geek gave the episode 3.5 out of 5 stars. He stated that the episode was "fun and has its share of laughs, but doesn’t raise the dead or leave a dent in the family car."

Colin Piwtorak of The Daily of the University of Washington thought the episode was "lazy and uncreative" and stated that the best part was the segment by John Kricfalusi.
