= To Courier with Love =

- The Simpsons episode
- Episode no.: Season 27; Episode 20
- Directed by: Timothy Bailey
- Written by: Bill Odenkirk
- Production code: VABF14
- Original air date: May 8, 2016

Guest appearance
- Jay Leno as himself

Episode features
- Chalkboard gag: "Dirty clothes are not a Mother's Day gift"
- Couch gag: The Simpsons run into a breakaway banner that has the couch on it, Homer then gets tackled by a football team.

Episode chronology
← Previous "Fland Canyon"	Next → "Simprovised"
- The Simpsons season 27

"To Courier with Love" is the twentieth episode of the twenty-seventh season of the American animated television series The Simpsons, and the 594th episode of the series overall. The episode was directed by Timothy Bailey and written by Bill Odenkirk. It aired in the United States on Fox on May 8, 2016.

In this episode, Homer promises a trip to Paris for Marge, but after he loses the money for it, he smuggles a snake to pay for it. Comedian Jay Leno guest starred as himself. The episode received positive reviews.

== Plot ==
In the Stone Age, ancient counterparts of the Simpsons portray The Invention of Motherhood as Marge tries to keep Homer, Bart, Lisa and Maggie under control.

Moving to the present day, the same things are happening at the Simpson house, and Marge tries to convince Homer to do his chores. In the garage, Lisa finds a rare Morgan car, left by the previous owner of the house and Homer decides to keep it.

In bed later, Marge confesses that she is not happy with her life. Homer seizes an opportunity to cheer her up when he sells Jay Leno his newly found car, and has the money for a trip. However, Leno soon returns and wants his money back, claiming the car was not registered to Homer and the police impounded it. Unfortunately, Marge has already decided on a trip to Paris and is very happy. To avoid disappointing her, Homer asks a travel agent if he can get the family to Paris at no cost. The agent offers to have Homer smuggle a package, which he must not open. On the plane, he opens it, finding a blue snake. Lisa finds out it is a rare endangered species. Homer promises not to let anything bad happen to it, while Lisa promises to help him preserve his marriage. Upon delivering the briefcase at the airport, they find out that the snake would be turned into a belt. Homer and Lisa manage to evade the snake's buyers, Cesar and Ugolin.

Later, Marge, Bart and Maggie are enjoying a Parisian restaurant, but when Marge finds out about the degree of animal cruelty involved, she asks Bart to dump her pâté in an alley. After putting down the plate, Bart finds out the alley is filled with starving paper-thin models for Paris Fashion Week. Bart proceeds to prank them by making them chase a hot dog on stage, where they get sucked up. Later, when Homer and Lisa try to set the snake free in the gardens of the Louvre, the buyers find them. They chase them to the rue des Lombards, where Homer and Lisa hide in one of the three main jazz clubs, leaving the briefcase behind near a statue. While there, Lisa plays the saxophone when the lead saxophonist collapses. Later in the evening, Homer and Marge go on a stroll and enjoy Paris. Homer confesses to Marge about the snake, retrieving it from the statue, and that he did it to make her happy. They spot the buyers near the river and make a run for it. However, back at the hotel, they are arrested by the police (French Wiggum, Eddie and Lou counterparts) after the contractors called them and having been informed of both Bart's and Lisa's shenanigans. The police search the briefcase and the entire room but find nothing and free the family. After everybody leaves, the snake comes out of its hiding spot in Marge's hair and the family later goes to set the snake free.

The episode ends back at Moe's Tavern, where Homer gives Lenny, Carl and Moe gifts from the trip, Moe's gift being a synthetic snakeskin belt. The episode shifts back to the Stone Age, showing a prehistoric Matt Groening drawing and signing the drawing of the scene at Moe's.

== Production ==
In April 2016, Entertainment Weekly reported that comedian Jay Leno would guest star as himself. Leno previously appeared as himself in the ninth season episode "The Last Temptation of Krust." Executive producer Al Jean said Leno was cast because the plot made sense for him due to his knowledge of cars. When Leno recorded his lines, he pointed out that to be historically accurate, the car his character is buying should have a wooden interior instead of a marble one.

== Cultural references ==
Aquarium by Camille Saint-Saëns plays while Homer admires Notre-Dame de Paris. Lisa is dressed like the title character from the Madeline media franchise. The house from the 2009 film Up collides with the boy from the 1956 film The Red Balloon. The car Homer finds is a Morgan 3 Wheeler, and Jay Leno arrives at the Simpson house the first time in a 1973 Citroen DS 23 Pallas.

== Reception ==
"To Courier with Love" received a 1.1 rating and was watched by 2.52 million viewers, making it the second most watched show on Fox that night.

Dennis Perkins of The A.V. Club gave the episode a B stating, "Sounds like a suitably silly setup for a Simpson family trip to the City of Light, and 'To Courier With Love' succeeds for the most part by sticking with the ordinary extraordinariness of how the Simpsons live their lives. 'There’s something truly amazing about you Dad, everything’s an adventure,' says Lisa admiringly after, in the episode’s adventure before the adventure proper, Homer discovers a rare and valuable old three-wheel car under a tarp in the Simpsons garage."

Tony Sokol of Den of Geek gave the episode 3 out of 5 stars. He stated that the episode was funny but wanted the family to be deported to be consistent with previous travel episodes.
