= The Burns Cage =

- The Simpsons episode
- Episode no.: Season 27; Episode 17
- Directed by: Rob Oliver
- Written by: Rob LaZebnik
- Production code: VABF10
- Original air date: April 3, 2016

Guest appearance
- George Takei as himself

Episode features
- Chalkboard gag: "If Villanova doesn't win, we lose everything"
- Couch gag: Homer texts emojis to the family, and then someone says it needs a payoff. The developers' credits are then shown on the phone instead of the television.

Episode chronology
| ← Previous "The Marge-ian Chronicles" | Next → "How Lisa Got Her Marge Back" |
- The Simpsons season 27

"The Burns Cage" is the seventeenth episode in the twenty-seventh season of the American animated television series The Simpsons, and the 591st episode of the series overall. It first aired on the Fox network in the United States on April 3, 2016.

In the episode, Waylon Smithers finally comes out as gay to his boss Mr. Burns, who rejects his love. Other characters attempt to find a boyfriend for Smithers, and he falls for Julio. Meanwhile, Milhouse competes against a new boy for the lead role in a school production of Casablanca, so he can act alongside his own unrequited love, Lisa. Openly gay actor George Takei makes a cameo as himself, and the episode features a variety of cultural references, including to Grindr, Vladimir Putin, Equus and the films of Humphrey Bogart.

The episode was written by Rob LaZebnik, inspired by when his teenage son Johnny came out. Critical reception was positive: the emotionally touching aspects of LaZebnik's script and Harry Shearer's portrayal of Smithers were praised. However, criticisms included the plot possibly ending the innuendo-driven humor involving Smithers' secret love of Burns, and an assumption that the character was being retconned due to changing attitudes on homosexuality since the series' debut. The episode was covered by international media.

== Plot ==
Smithers almost declares his love for Mr. Burns after he saves Burns' life in a skydiving accident, but Burns reaffirms his indifference and ingratitude for him. Angry and heartbroken, Smithers treats Homer, Lenny and Carl harshly, so they decide to find Smithers a boyfriend so he will be better-tempered. They invite potential partners to meet Smithers at a gay men's singles' party, where a neck massage from Julio snaps Smithers out of his bad mood. The two fall for each other, Smithers gives Homer time off with pay for this and Smithers resigns his job at the power plant.

Smithers becomes troubled on a trip to Julio's homeland of Cuba when Julio's carnival outfit resembles Burns; Julio notices and asks Smithers if he is committed to their relationship, and Smithers admits that he is not. Back in Springfield, Burns' attempts to find a new assistant prove disastrous, and his only option is to rehire Smithers. He meets Smithers with money and other enticements to lure him back, but Smithers states that he is not swayed. Burns then says he has kept a secret bottled up: that Smithers' performance review is "excellent". They hug and reconcile.

Meanwhile, Springfield Elementary put on a production of Casablanca, in which Lisa gets the lead role of Ilsa. Milhouse wants the male lead role of Rick because of his love for Lisa, but he is challenged by a new boy, Jack DeForest, who dresses, acts and speaks like Humphrey Bogart. Milhouse enlists the bullies to beat up Jack, but Jack wins the fight. Principal Skinner sees this violence and declares that Milhouse will play Rick instead of Jack; Lisa is angered as Milhouse is a terrible actor. Marge tells Lisa that it is important to encourage people who are not skilled by telling them that they are, using the example of Homer. Milhouse does give a great performance and the production is a success, but in the end, it is revealed that Jack was disguised as Milhouse; he and Lisa leave hand-in-hand.

In an epilogue, Milhouse goes to Moe's Tavern, where Smithers teaches him that romantic setbacks are part of the search for love, and make the pursuit of it worthwhile even if (clearly referring to himself) the odds are that true love will never be found. Moe tells the pair that he only searches for gold, not girls, and embarks on a treasure hunt with Jack and Groundskeeper Willie.

== Production ==
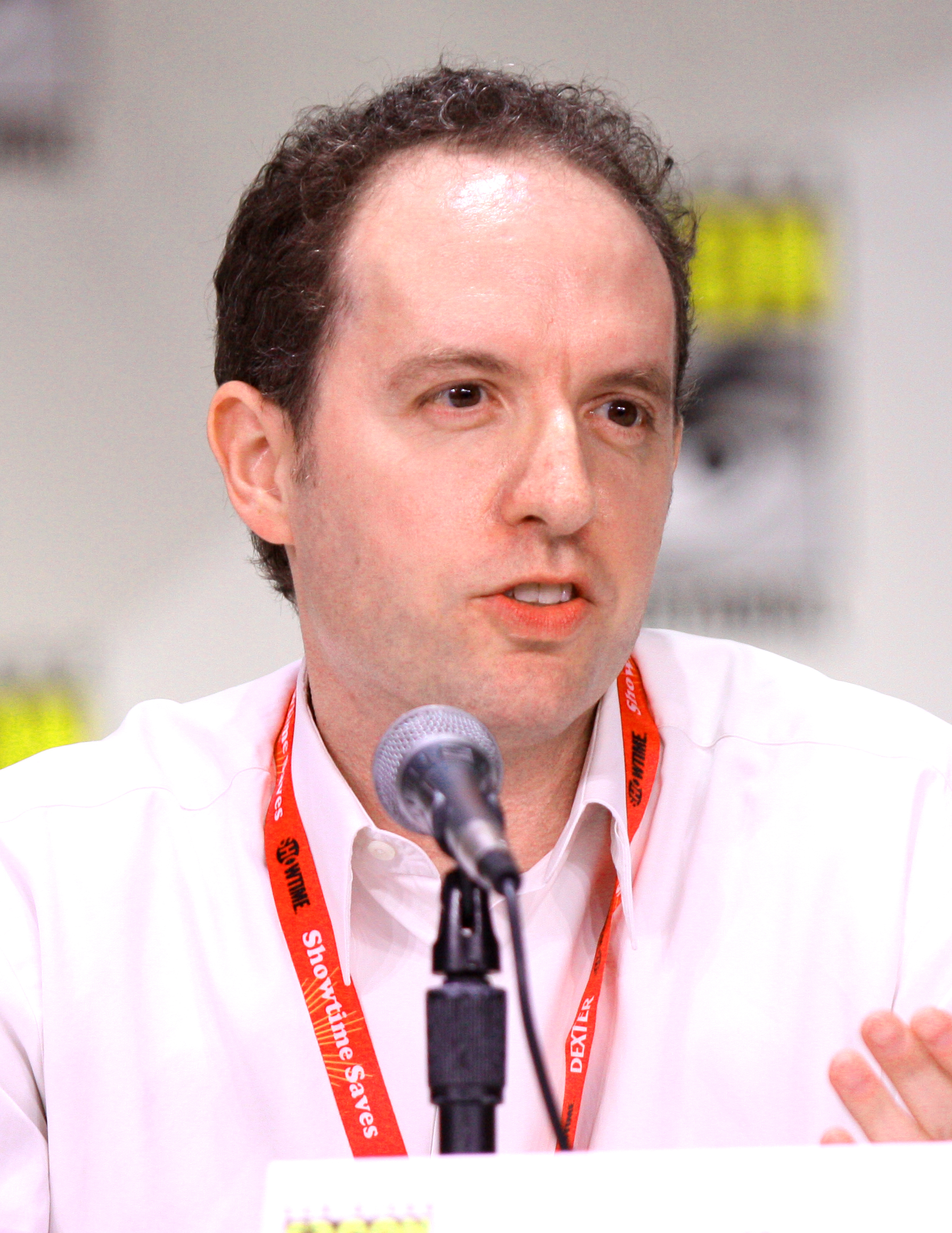
Writer Rob LaZebnik was inspired by his son, who came out as gay while at high school.

Smithers' unrequited love for Mr. Burns is a long-running gag on The Simpsons; the producers once joked that he was not gay, but "Burns-sexual". Rolling Stone described the character's sexual orientation as the show's "worst-kept secret", noting how in one episode he had a vacation at an all-male resort, and in another he wore "rainbow-striped short shorts" in Springfield's gay district. In September 2015, in an interview to promote the 27th season, executive producer Al Jean announced that "we actually do a lot with Smithers this year", adding that two episodes would deal with the character's sexuality, including one in which he becomes tired of Burns not appreciating him.

Writer Rob LaZebnik told the New York Post that the episode was inspired by his son Johnny, who came out as gay while at high school: "I am a Midwestern guy, so I don’t tend to wear my emotions on my sleeve, but I thought, 'What better way to tell my son I love him than to write a cartoon about it?'". He added that he pitched the storyline three years earlier, and got approval for his script from his son. Smithers' coming out is low-key, as was Johnny's; he told the Post that as he was "the gayest little kid", his parents were not surprised by his sexual orientation. The episode aired five days before Johnny's 22nd birthday, and he said he would have a viewing party because the episode would be "particularly meaningful" to him. The elder LaZebnik stated his opinion that LGBTQ-related television can have a "real impact on people's thinking".

== Cultural references ==
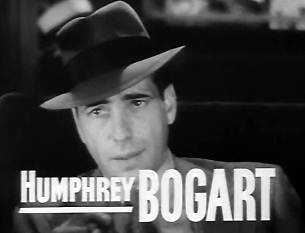
The character Jack DeForest is based on Humphrey Bogart, whose own middle was DeForest, and the episode makes references to several of his films, most visibly Casablanca.

The episode's title comes from the 1996 LGBT-related comedy film The Birdcage, in which Simpsons voice actor Hank Azaria plays a Guatemalan housekeeper; his portrayal of Cuban bartender Julio in this episode is similar.

In the chalkboard gag in the episode's opening sequence, Bart backs the Villanova Wildcats, who won the 2016 NCAA Men's Division I Basketball Championship Game the day after the episode aired. Fans wondered why the show's staff were supporting Villanova over the North Carolina Tar Heels; one Internet writer hypothesized that it was a reference to the season 9 episode "The City of New York vs. Homer Simpson", in which after one of his typical alcoholic binges, Barney Gumble can only recall "giving a guest lecture at Villanova, or maybe it was a street corner."

The episode includes a variety of cultural references. Among Smithers' paintings of Burns is a parody of a photograph of Russian president Vladimir Putin riding a horse while bare-chested. Smithers likens Homer, Lenny and Carl to The Three Stooges, and Homer chooses Smithers' potential partners via the gay dating app Grindr. At the party, George Takei asks another man if he wants to hear "horror stories" about his Star Trek co-star William Shatner, and he is pleased that the man does not know who Shatner is. A billboard outside the school's production of Casablanca advertises that the kindergarten are putting on a production of zoophilia-themed play Equus the following night. The end sequence with the treasure hunt pays homage to Bogart's The Treasure of the Sierra Madre and The African Queen.

== Reception ==
"The Burns Cage" scored a 1.0 rating in the 18–49 demographic, and was watched by 2.32 million viewers, making it Fox's highest rated show of the night.

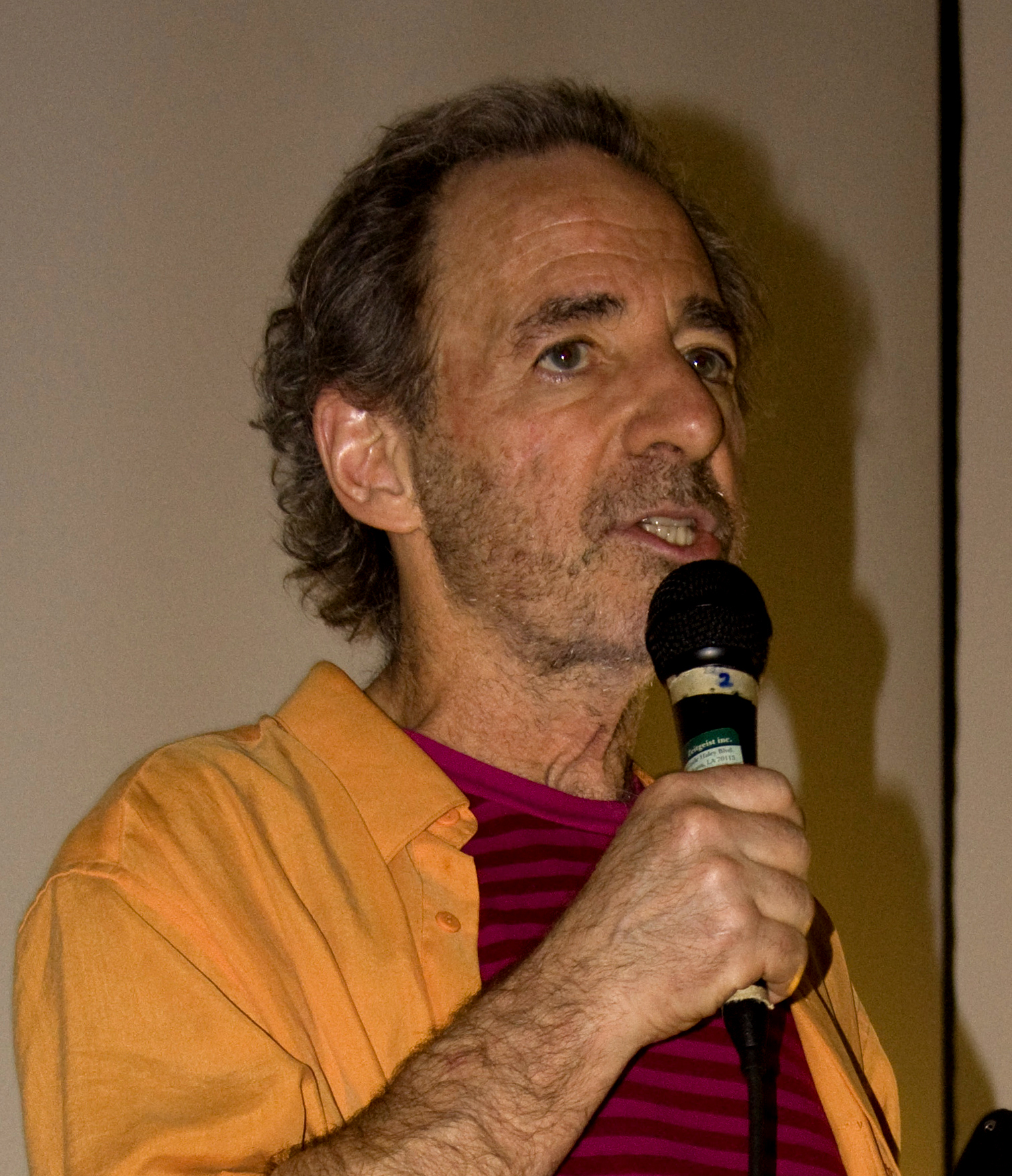
Harry Shearer's performance as Smithers was described by one critic as "touching".

Dennis Perkins of The A.V. Club gave the episode a B+, commenting that casual viewers would have already presumed that Smithers had come out. He described Harry Shearer's performance and LaZebnik's script as "touching".

Tony Sokol of Den of Geek felt that Smithers coming out was good for social acceptance, but would end the comedy around his sexuality, which is based on double entendre. He wrote that the love story had "a few subversive laugh lines" but more "missed opportunities". He added that the school's production of Casablanca was disappointing compared to the series' previous adaptations of A Streetcar Named Desire and Planet of the Apes, and gave his opinion that the Bogart homages ruined the opportunity to do better parodies of his films. However, he noted that the season had a better quality of animation.

Writing in British progressive magazine the New Statesman, Anna Leszkiewicz felt that the episode was not about "coming out", as the innuendo concerning Smithers' sexuality had been running for decades. She felt it was retconning the series, which had made arguably homophobic jokes around the character, for modern sensitivities; this was likened to how Harry Potter author J. K. Rowling revealed that Albus Dumbledore was gay after the series had finished. Leszkiewicz concluded that it was progress – for the show more than for the LGBT community – that homosexuality was being treated in a more mature way on The Simpsons, but that the change should have been made at least a decade ago.

The episode was covered by international media outlets including the BBC, The Australian, Die Welt, La Stampa, Jornal de Notícias, El Mundo, and L'Avenir.

== See also ==
- Lists of American television episodes with LGBT themes
