= Paths of Glory (The Simpsons) =

- The Simpsons episode
- Episode no.: Season 27; Episode 8
- Directed by: Steven Dean Moore
- Written by: Michael Ferris
- Production code: VABF01
- Original air date: December 6, 2015

Episode features
- Couch gag: Homer rolls the dice, which reveals all the Simpsons, but his side flips to Mr. Burns. Homer then says "D'oh!"

Episode chronology
← Previous "Lisa with an 'S'"	Next → "Barthood"
- The Simpsons season 27

"Paths of Glory" is the eighth episode of the twenty-seventh season of the American animated television series The Simpsons, and the 582nd episode of the series overall. The episode was directed by Steven Dean Moore and written by Michael Ferris. It aired in the United States on Fox on December 6, 2015.

In this episode, Bart learns his parents suspect he is a sociopath, so he pretends to be one. The episode received mixed reviews.

== Plot ==
Lisa participates in an Alternative Energy Derby with a car powered by solar energy, but the Duff Blimp passes over and causes her car to stop inches from the finish line. She is mocked because of this, and the Old Jewish Man comments about Amelia Vanderbuckle, a Springfieldian inventor of the 19th century who was committed to the Springfield Asylum, following an accident caused by one of her inventions beheading one of the town's aldermen, however, she continued to make her inventions. Lisa realizes that the only way to bring her reputation back is to break into the mental asylum with Bart and find one of Amelia's inventions.

At the asylum, Lisa discovers a clue from a voice recording of Amelia's, which reveals a secret diary with details of an invention that could restore Amelia's reputation as a whole. Bart finds the diary of Nathan Little, a sociopath who lived there, in the asylum. He decides to take the diary to school and shows it to his friends, which terrorizes Ralph Wiggum, who later tells about the diary to his father Chief Wiggum. Wiggum assumes Bart wrote the diary himself and informs Marge that he himself, is a sociopath, making her and Homer worried about their own son. They decide to do a sociopath test with him, disguised as a "Jet ski Dude or Motocross Maestro" test, but the label falls off and Bart discovers his parents' intentions and decides to answer all the questions as if he was the worst sociopath that ever existed. This makes Homer and Marge even more worried, and they decide to take Bart to an asylum. As all the children there have no reactions, an army general says that they are perfect to test U.S. Air Force Drone Simulators. Bart manages to destroy all targets, but later the USAF General informs the children that they were actually controlling a real drone, killing real people (as in Ender's Game). While the other kids react enthusiastically, Bart is horrified by this news and tearfully says he didn't, and doesn't, want to kill anyone; the General and a civilian staffer tell Bart he has shown he is a good person with genuine emotions, and that he will be sent home because that makes him completely useless for their project. To Bart's relief, the kids are told that the first revelation was a lie and that the program is in fact a simulation, but unlike Bart, the other kids have "passed" the test and can expect work in the future.

Meanwhile, Lisa pairs up with Milhouse to find Amelia's invention, that is buried under a former feminist club, that is now a Knockers restaurant. They ask a girl, who ends up being Groundskeeper Willie in disguise to help them drill the building's basement to find her invention. They are successful and find what at first glimpse looks like a loom, but is actually the first computational device ever invented. Lisa accomplishes her objective and Amelia's invention is donated to the museum, even though nobody but Lisa is interested in seeing it.

During the credits, Homer uses the loom to view erotic images when Marge walks in on him and he tries to get rid of it to no avail.

== Release ==
The original broadcast of the episode was delayed to at least 16 minutes due to an address by President Barack Obama on the 2015 San Bernardino attack.

== Reception ==
"Paths of Glory" scored a 2.3 rating and was watched by 5.53 million viewers, making it Fox's highest rated show of the whole night.

Dennis Perkins of The A.V. Club gave the episode a B− saying, "The bummer here is that there are enough clever, thoughtful details in these half-stories that, given time to breathe and develop, they both could have been much more compelling episodes of The Simpsons. As it is here, ‘Paths of Glory’ goes out of its way to call attention to the slapdash way the episode is constructed, with all the Simpson family coming in for a big group hug, each rotely rattling off the reasons why they’re so grateful to be back together. Like that hug, the episode itself ends in a big, sloppy heap of unearned sentiment."

Tony Sokol of Den of Geek gave the episode 4 out of 5 stars. He said the episode was well timed with a steady rate of jokes.
