= Gal of Constant Sorrow =

- The Simpsons episode
- Episode no.: Season 27; Episode 14
- Directed by: Matthew Nastuk
- Written by: Carolyn Omine
- Production code: VABF06
- Original air date: February 21, 2016

Guest appearances
- Bob Boilen as himself; Kelsey Grammer as Sideshow Bob; Natalie Maines as Hettie (singing voice); Kate McKinnon as Hettie

Episode features
- Couch gag: The Simpson family dressed as American football players reunites at the center and get in position, Homer tries to sneak Maggie in as a football but goes over the couch and smashes the wall where he finds the TV remote.

Episode chronology
← Previous "Love Is in the N_{2}-O_{2}-Ar-CO_{2}-Ne-He-CH_{4}"	Next → "Lisa the Veterinarian"
- The Simpsons season 27

"Gal of Constant Sorrow" is the fourteenth episode of the twenty-seventh season of the American animated television series The Simpsons, and the 588th episode of the series overall. The episode was directed by Matthew Nastuk and written by Carolyn Omine. It aired in the United States on Fox on February 21, 2016.

In this episode, Lisa encounters a homeless woman who is musically talented and arranges a concert for her while Homer does a poor job of fixing things around the house. Natalie Maines and Kate McKinnon guest starred. Musician Bob Boilen appeared as himself. The episode received positive reviews.

== Plot ==
During breakfast, Marge discovers a loose tile on the floor and says that she will have to call a handyman. Homer gets the hint that he is not handy and decides to replace the tile himself. He succeeds with the help of an online tutorial, but soon realizes that he has trapped the family cat Snowball II inside the floor. He later manages to free the cat from the walls, but then traps Santa's Little Helper inside. Homer eventually falls through the roof trying to rescue the dog, only to find that Marge has already rescued him and has been doing the handiwork around the house to cover for Homer's mistakes; she admits she played along with this as she found the idea of Homer being "handy" attractive.

Meanwhile, Bart participates in a sled race on a hill, but Milhouse slows them down out of fear of slants. Bart knocks Milhouse off, but he loses control of the sled and hits the shopping cart of a homeless woman named Hettie Mae Boggs, throwing it and all of her things into a frozen river. Feeling guilty, he invites Hettie to the Simpsons' house. Hettie gets too comfortable in Bart's closet, so she decides to give Bart one dollar per day as rent. Lisa soon notices Bart's suspicious income and discovers Hettie, but Bart convinces her not to tell Marge out of fear that Hettie will get kicked out of the house.

They also discover Hettie's incredible talent for music, so Lisa invites her to stay in her closet and helps her record her songs. Bart warns Lisa against this because if Hettie lets her down, Lisa will not be able to deal with her emotions. Lisa showcases the songs for the town and manages to arrange a concert and an NPR interview for Hettie. Much to Lisa's shock, Hettie reveals during the interview that she is a heroin addict who has a propensity for shooting people in the face if she does not get the drug.

When Hettie goes missing on the night of her concert, Bart and Lisa come clean about her to Marge and Homer. With less than thirty minutes before the concert, Lisa distracts the audience by playing her saxophone while Homer and Bart search for Hettie. They manage to find Hettie drinking on Cletus Spuckler's farm. They calm her down and persuade her to come to her concert, only to find that a heartbroken Lisa had failed to entertain the crowd and the place is almost empty. Hettie sings one last song dedicated to Lisa, who decides to forgive her.

During the credits, Hettie is shown playing in a rehab clinic as the interns and fellow patients escape to Moe's Tavern through a secret tunnel. One of the group, Disco Stu, comments that the bar is dirtier than the tunnel.

== Production ==
In an interview in June 2015, executive producer Al Jean said that Kate McKinnon would guest star in an episode as a homeless woman with musician Natalie Maines providing her singing voice. Maines previously appeared as herself as part of The Chicks, credited as The Dixie Chicks, in the nineteenth season episode "Papa Don't Leech." Jean described the character as the opposite of Bleeding Gums Murphy, and although Lisa would help with her music career, it would not progress the same way.

Musician Bob Boilen appeared as himself, who hosts a radio show in Springfield called "Mountain Trax."

== Cultural references ==
"Started from the Bottom" by Drake plays while Bart spends his money. Lisa's imagination during Hettie's first song shows Apu and two of his children in the same pose as Migrant Mother by Dorothea Lange. On the concert stage, Hettie sings a parody of "Down in the River to Pray." Over the end credits, Hettie sings a parody of "The Big Rock Candy Mountains."

== Reception ==
"Gal of Constant Sorrow" scored a 1.4 rating and was watched by 3.10 million viewers, making it Fox's highest rated show of the night.

Dennis Perkins of The A.V. Club gave the episode a B+ stating, "For all the griping about The Simpsons overstaying its welcome, it doesn’t take much for the show to win back viewers’ trust and affection. The characters and pieces are all in place, just waiting for the right tune to start moving in a semblance of their former hilarious harmony. For the second episode this season, credited writer Carolyn Omine pitches her script with a deftness and an understanding of the Simpsons that makes an episode fairly sing."

Tony Sokol of Den of Geek gave the episode 3.5 out of 5 stars. He stated that the episode was evenly paced and highlighted the heroine twist. He also praised the song lyrics.
