= Fland Canyon =

- The Simpsons episode
- Episode no.: Season 27; Episode 19
- Directed by: Mike Frank Polcino
- Written by: J. Stewart Burns
- Production code: VABF12
- Original air date: April 24, 2016

Episode features
- Chalkboard gag: "Dad swears he'll gets his taxes in soon"
- Couch gag: Gag by veteran Disney animator Eric Goldberg: The Simpsons become different Disney characters with Maggie as 1920s-era Minnie Mouse, Lisa as Cinderella, Marge as Snow White, Homer as Baloo, and Bart as Sorcerer's apprentice Mickey Mouse.

Episode chronology
← Previous "How Lisa Got Her Marge Back"	Next → "To Courier with Love"
- The Simpsons season 27

"Fland Canyon" is the nineteenth episode of the twenty-seventh season of the American animated television series The Simpsons, and the 593rd episode of the series overall. The episode was directed by Mike Frank Polcino and written by J. Stewart Burns. It aired in the United States on Fox on April 24, 2016.

In this episode, Homer tells Maggie the story of their trip to the Grand Canyon with the Flanders. The couch gag was created by animator Eric Goldberg. The episode received mixed reviews.

== Plot ==
Homer is trying to help Maggie sleep. After a few failed attempts, she hints to him that she wants to hear a bedtime story. He starts by telling the story of the Grand Canyon vacation with the Flanders. The story takes place two years earlier, with people from the church volunteering to clean a skid row on Saturday. At the end of the cleanup, Ned wins a family trip to the Grand Canyon for being the most selfless cleaner. After reading the pamphlet, Ned realizes that it is a two family trip. They invite the Lovejoy family, but they convince Ned to take the Simpsons with them.

At the canyon, everyone is astonished by the view, but the two families are not getting along very well. The Flanders are annoyed at Bart and Homer's shenanigans, and Marge is upset at Maude for pointing it out. During a mule trail, they are passed by a group of zillionaires that use the canyon at their own wish. Later, the tour guide and his mule fall to their deaths off the cliff with most of the supplies, leaving both families stranded in the canyon.

Homer manages to make Maggie fall asleep with the story, but Lisa wants to know what happened next. Homer continues telling the story, waking up Maggie, who wants to hear it. Ned and Homer decide to look for supplies when they find the zillionaires' camping site. Homer convinces Ned to steal their food and supplies and escape down the river using a raft. They manage to reach their campsite and surprise everyone with a breakfast, with caviar and bacon (which Lisa happily eats; Homer and Lisa then explain to Maggie that the story took place before she became a vegetarian). Later, they are rescued and Homer and Ned talk about their friendship.

When Homer finishes the story, it is revealed that Ned is also listening through the window. Ned reminds him that they still owe them a trip. In the final scene, the Simpsons take the Flanders on a trip to a postcard museum. When Ned asks Homer if the place sells postcards at the gift shop, a museum worker states that they do not.

== Production ==
The couch gag was created by Eric Goldberg of Walt Disney Animation Studios. The gag depicts the Simpson family as various The Walt Disney Company characters.

== Reception ==
"Fland Canyon" scored a 1.2 rating and was watched by 2.77 million viewers, making it Fox's highest rated show of the night.

Dennis Perkins of The A.V. Club gave "Fland Canyon" a C+. He added, "The problem with an episode like 'Fland Canyon' is that it’s content to pluck parts from older episodes without doing anything new or interesting with them. That there are laughs here and there isn’t surprising—even on and off day, The Simpsons (and the Simpsons) form a reliable bedrock for comedy. In this flashback story of a heretofore unrevealed early shared vacation of the Simpson and Flanders families, however, there’s a combination of old gags indifferently told, new gags told coarsely and/or cruelly, and some off-model characterization (especially with regard to Ned) that comes off as deeply disposable Simpsons."

Tony Sokol of Den of Geek gave the episode 3.5 out of 5 stars. He enjoyed the interaction of the Flanders and Simpson families and highlighted the commentary on rich people bringing the comforts of home into the wild.
