= How Lisa Got Her Marge Back =

- The Simpsons episode
- Episode no.: Season 27; Episode 18
- Directed by: Bob Anderson
- Written by: Jeff Martin
- Production code: VABF11
- Original air date: April 10, 2016

Guest appearance
- Andrew Rannells as himself

Episode features
- Chalkboard gag: "Never lose a bet to Bart Simpson" (written by an annoyed Principal Skinner while Bart proudly watches).
- Couch gag: In space, Marge and the kids wake up and find a skeleton Homer in his sleeping chamber.

Episode chronology
← Previous "The Burns Cage"	Next → "Fland Canyon"
- The Simpsons season 27

"How Lisa Got Her Marge Back" is the eighteenth episode of the twenty-seventh season of the American animated television series The Simpsons, and the 592nd episode of the series overall. It aired in the United States on Fox on April 10, 2016.

The episode was directed by Bob Anderson and marks as the first to be written by Jeff Martin since season five's "Homer's Barbershop Quartet". In this episode, Marge tries to reconcile with Lisa after saying she does not like her jazz music while Bart uses Maggie to play pranks on people. Actor Andrew Rannells guest starred as himself. The episode received mixed reviews.

== Plot ==
Bart buys a Money Grabber, a device to pull away dollar bills and trick people. However, everyone realizes it is one of Bart's pranks. Afterwards, Bart is pranked by another group. Later, he tries to pull a prank on Ralph, but even he will not fall for it.

Later at breakfast, Lisa tries to show Homer and Marge her new saxophone solo, but Homer leaves for work and Lisa plays for Marge for 12 minutes, leaving her feeling tired. Later that day, she tries to play for her parents again, but she goes to her bedroom to fix one of her reeds. That's when Marge confesses to Homer that she hates jazz, even when Lisa plays it. Unfortunately, Lisa hears her confession and confronts her mother, avoiding her hugs and calling her "Marjorie", much to Marge's shock. Homer is unperturbed by this as Bart calls him by his first name many times, though Marge points out that Bart only does that out of disrespect.

Marge decides to take Lisa on a trip to Capital City to cheer her up, like taking her on the Capital City Dream Tour. However, Marge's attempts to bond with Lisa annoy her even more, to the point where she stops wearing her pearl necklace. In a final attempt to calm Lisa down, Marge takes her to Bad News Bears - The Musical. At the show, Lisa realizes that her mom has very different tastes than she does, and she decides to just pretend to like the musical, just like Marge did with her solo. At the exit, Marge meets the show's star, Andrew Rannells, and invites him to join them for dinner.

Meanwhile, back in Springfield, Homer gives Bart the responsibility over Maggie while the girls are out. Bart soon realizes that playing with Maggie is fun, and she could be his sidekick for pranks. The first pranks go well, as they trick the Flanders into thinking Maggie is an angel and giving a fake glass Maggie to Gil Gunderson, making him think he just dropped a baby, but everything almost goes wrong when they are pranking Homer, as Maggie is disguised as Bart and he almost strangles her. After that, Homer asks Bart to stop using Maggie to prank people, not wanting her to turn out like her older brother.

At Capital City, Lisa is discussing Andrew's presentation, saying that unlike her, Marge thought he was amazing, and starts complaining about her family, but Andrew points out that Lisa has ignored all of Marge's attempts to reconcile. Feeling bad, Lisa and Marge apologize to each other. While leaving the restaurant, the trio spot a saxophone player, whom Andrew encourages to allow Lisa to play his saxophone. With her confidence restored, Lisa sings "Don't Rain on My Parade", and Marge congratulates her for her impromptu number.

Marge and Lisa later partake in the Capital City Crime Tour which shows the different areas where known crimes have happened in Capital City, like the 19th Street Liquor Store, which was the epicenter of the 1967 riots (where it never fully stopped), and a high rise where State Senator Wilcox was shot in mid-air as he plummeted to his death. Marge and Lisa are pleased with their trip.

Before the end credits, Lisa gathers her classmates in the treehouse for an impromptu jazz session whilst Homer is shown putting different recycling bins full of beer bottles and Grampa out at the curb. Marge, bopping along to the music at first, throws Maggie's toy saxophone into one of the recycling bins.

== Production ==
The episode was written by Jeff Martin, who had not written an episode for The Simpsons since the fifth season episode "Homer's Barbershop Quartet."

In August 2015, TVLine reported that Andrew Rannells would guest star as himself performing Bad News Bears: The Musical in Capital City. He would meet Lisa in a backstage meet-and-greet. Rannells stated that he would be playing a meaner version of himself and would help Marge and Lisa repair their relationship.

== Cultural references ==
The title of this episode is a reference to the 1998 romantic comedy-drama movie How Stella Got Her Groove Back. Lisa plays a twelve-minute version of "My Funny Valentine" for Marge. She later sings "Don't Rain on My Parade" from Funny Girl. Other Capital City parody shows include: Rats (parody of Cats), Guys and Guys (Guys and Dolls) and Monty Python's Spamilton (Monty Python's Spamalot), also a reference to the Hamilton musical. Winnie the Pooh and Paddington Bear are seated under a Da Bears sign.

When Bart and Maggie prank Rod and Todd, there is a Wayne’s World reference where Rod and Todd bow down to Maggie chanting “We’re Not Worthy!”

== Reception ==
"How Lisa Got Her Marge Back" scored a 1.2 rating and was watched by 2.55 million viewers, making it Fox's second highest rated show of the night.

Dennis Perkins of The A.V. Club gave the episode a "B−", stating, "Marge and Lisa have a fight in the first act of ‘How Lisa Got Her Marge Back’. Which means they're going to make up by the end of the episode, and, in true fashion of not only 'The Simpsons' but most sitcoms ever made, that fight is not going to affect their relationship in any appreciable way going forward. I’ve always maintained that that's not a problem in itself—'The Simpsons' can go on as long as these actors’ voices and Fox's largesse hold out because, not in spite of, the show's weekly-rewritten reality. It's an endlessly renewable resource where good writers can play out these characters’ stories—silly, emotional, or any combination thereof—again and again. It's all in how it's written."

Tony Sokol of Den of Geek gave the episode 2.5 out of 5 stars. He called the episode a lackluster set of gags and self-referential satire.
