= Friend with Benefit =

- The Simpsons episode
- Episode no.: Season 27; Episode 6
- Directed by: Matthew Faughnan
- Written by: Rob LaZebnik
- Production code: TABF21
- Original air date: November 8, 2015

Guest appearances
- Kristen Bell as Harper Jambowski; David Copperfield as himself

Episode chronology
← Previous "Treehouse of Horror XXVI"	Next → "Lisa with an 'S'"
- The Simpsons season 27

"Friend with Benefit" is the sixth episode of the twenty-seventh season of the American animated television series The Simpsons, and the 580th episode of the series overall. The episode was directed by Matthew Faughnan and written by Rob LaZebnik. It aired in the United States on Fox on November 8, 2015.

In this episode, Lisa becomes friends with a rich girl, and Homer uses it to enjoy the rich lifestyle. Kristen Bell guest starred as Harper Jambowski, and illusionist David Copperfield appeared as himself. The episode received positive reviews.

== Plot ==
The episode opens with a short parody of the Disney short Feast entitled "Fat". Santa's Little Helper is fed scraps from the Simpsons' dinner table until he gets too fat and dies. He goes to Heaven and God offers him a choice between Fit Dog Heaven and Fat Dog Hell. Fat Dog Hell flashes a "Free Pizza" sign and Santa's Little Helper runs inside.

Homer sees a commercial for a self-lifting chair and becomes interested in buying one, but the $1,100 price dismays him. After Lenny and Carl suggest that he try to raise the money through crowdfunding, Homer posts a video that persuades the residents of Springfield to donate. He soon has enough to buy the chair and posts a follow-up video of himself enjoying it, but the townspeople become so enraged upon seeing his frivolous use of their money that they storm the Simpson house and destroy the chair.

Meanwhile, at Springfield Elementary, Lisa tries to attract potential members for the school magic club. A girl named Harper Jambowski (voiced by Kristen Bell) becomes interested in signing up, and the two begin to spend time together. Lisa tries to calm Homer's anger about losing the chair by asking him to take her and Harper to an Australian boy band concert, for which Harper's father Mike has already bought tickets. Homer agrees, but is surprised to discover that the group's seats are in an expensive VIP skybox. Mike, a wealthy entrepreneur and owner of several businesses and sports teams, joins them in the box, and he and Homer strike up a friendship of their own.

On the way home, Lisa complains to Homer that Harper never let her talk during the show, but Homer persuades her to stay friends with Harper so she can enjoy all the luxuries of the Jambowskis' lifestyle. Harper invites Homer and Lisa to see a performance by David Copperfield, but again she stops Lisa from participating as the fathers enjoy themselves. As Lisa becomes disenchanted with Harper, Mike invites the Simpsons to spend a week on his private island. They decline at first due to the children needing to attend school, but Mike bribes Principal Skinner to close Springfield Elementary for a week so they can go.

Harper gives Lisa a fancy new bicycle, but Lisa sees it as an insult to the one she owns and feels that Harper is trying to control everything around her. Although their argument escalates, Lisa decides to remain friends with Harper so that the family can enjoy the island's comforts. When the girls begin fighting again during the trip, Homer reluctantly takes the family home early for Lisa's sake, commenting that no one who would treat her so badly deserves to be her friend.

During the credits, Homer ruefully says goodbye to the island's amenities as the family flies back to Springfield. Looking out the window, he and Lisa see that Bart is still on the island and has spelled out the message "So long suckers" on the shore.

== Production ==
In April 2015, Entertainment Weekly reported that Kristen Bell was cast as Harper, who is Lisa's new entitled friend. Executive producer Al Jean described the character as a good friend if one obeys her. Illusionist David Copperfield would also play himself in the episode.

== Cultural references ==
Lenny mentions the crowdfunding process to produce Zach Braff's 2014 film Wish I Was Here. The movie theater on the island is playing the film Back to the Future.

== Reception ==
"Friend With Benefit" scored a 1.5 rating and was watched by 3.48 million viewers, making the episode Fox's highest rated show of the night.

Dennis Perkins of The A.V. Club gave the episode a B+ stating, "This season has seen the show rediscover how fruitful it can be to bring Lisa back down closer to her own age. Sure, she’s almost always the smartest person in the room, but here, as in the truly, restoratively excellent 'Halloween Of Horror,' that intelligence, when coupled with an eight-year-old’s emotional intellect, has freed up the show to make Lisa more vital than she’s been in a while. A lot of that has to do with Yeardley Smith’s performances, naturally. Even in the most indifferent of episodes, it’s evident how committed Smith is to her signature role, but when, as here, more care has been taken to establish Lisa’s character—and keep it consistent throughout—she can really make Lisa come alive...Here, she’s a smart, nerdy little kid who’s thrilled to have a new friend but also age-appropriately quick to recoil from injustice."

Tony Sokol of Den of Geek gave the episode 3.5 out of 5 stars. He praised the jokes and commentary but said it did not have the buffoonery that sets the show apart from others.
