= Halloween of Horror =

- The Simpsons episode
- Episode no.: Season 27; Episode 4
- Directed by: Mike B. Anderson
- Written by: Carolyn Omine
- Production code: TABF22
- Original air date: October 18, 2015

Guest appearances
- Blake Anderson as Dickie; Nick Kroll as Lem

Episode chronology
← Previous "Puffless"	Next → "Treehouse of Horror XXVI"
- The Simpsons season 27

"Halloween of Horror" is the fourth episode of the twenty-seventh season of the American animated television series The Simpsons, and the 578th episode of the series overall. The episode was directed by Mike B. Anderson and written by Carolyn Omine. It originally aired in the United States on Fox on October 18, 2015.

In this episode, Lisa becomes scared of everything after experiencing a horror night at the Krustyland theme park, and salesmen try to get revenge on Homer at the Simpson house. Blake Anderson and Nick Kroll guest starred. The episode received highly positive reviews from critics. The episode won the Annie Award for Best General Audience Animated Television Broadcast Production.

It is the first Halloween-themed episode of The Simpsons that is not part of the show's Treehouse of Horror series.

== Plot ==
The day before Halloween, the Simpsons decorate their house, calling it "Everscream Terrors". Homer, having accidentally melted the plastic skeletons, goes to replace them at the Halloween pop-up store. On the way, Lisa sees a sign advertising the Krustyland Halloween Horror Night and is excited to be old enough to go. At the store, Apu gets angry at three seasonal employees. One of them gives Homer a deal where if he buys one "Señor Skeletino" directly from him, he will get three more for free. Homer accepts but tells Apu, who fires the workers. They vow revenge on Homer. Later, Homer takes the children to Halloween Horror Night. Lisa gets scared by the costumed people and tells Homer she wants to go home. But because the tickets were expensive and he and Bart are already enjoying it, Homer tells her the park is not scary. Lisa gets lost and separated from Homer and gets scared to the point where the employees are required to shut down and reset the event.

At school, Lisa has hallucinations from the Halloween decorations. In terror, she hides inside a locker until Marge retrieves her and brings her home early. Marge tells Homer to shut down Everscream Terrors, upsetting Homer and Bart. As Marge takes Bart and Maggie to a Halloween block party, Homer tries to bond with Lisa at home, but the three workers arrive. Homer locks up the house, but they are already inside. Meanwhile, Marge, Bart, and Maggie arrive at the block party, but they leave because it is for residents only.

Marge tries to take Bart and Maggie trick-or-treating, but it is too late, leading to the adults coming outside in their suggestive costumes. Meanwhile, Homer tries to take Lisa to the Flanders house, but she runs back to get Tailee, her comfort toy raccoon tail. Homer rushes to save her, but they encounter the invaders. The two run and hide in the attic. With Lisa afraid, Homer admits he is also scared but encourages her to not let her fears prevent her from thinking. They use holiday decorations to signal for help, but they accidentally activate the Señor Skeletinos, giving away their location. Homer climbs onto the roof to light fireworks, but the wind extinguishes the matches. Lisa, remembering that Tailee is flammable, sacrifices Tailee to light the fireworks. They wake the neighborhood, and the invaders are arrested. Homer rebuilds Everscream Terrors. Lisa, now overcoming her trauma, scares Marge while wearing her Frida Kahlo costume as she arrives home with Bart, who is delighted to see the house decorated again.

Later, Maggie finds and magically restores the half-burnt Tailee.

== Production ==
This is the first Halloween-themed episode outside of the Treehouse of Horror series. Because it is the first Halloween episode to take place in the canonical Simpsons world, the producers wanted to include as many Halloween themes as possible. Writer Carolyn Omine based Lisa's fear on her own childhood experiences and those of her son and niece. She also incorporated her parental behavior into Homer's ability to protect Lisa. Tailee is based on a doll that director Mike B. Anderson's daughter used as a security blanket. Executive producer Matt Selman liked the episode's idea of showing the difference between the fear of what is real and the fear of what is not real.

Nick Kroll and Blake Anderson were cast as Halloween store employees who lose their jobs because of Homer. Kroll called the appearance a "lifelong dream."

== Cultural references ==
Homer whistles the main theme from the 1978 film Halloween. It also plays over the end credits. The musical number, "NC-17 Halloween", performed by the costumed adults, is a parody of the ones performed in the 1975 film The Rocky Horror Picture Show. In the third act, Kent Brockman wears a Ziggy Stardust costume.

== Reception ==
=== Viewing figures ===
The episode received a 1.7 rating and was watched by a total of 3.69 million people, making it the most watched show on Fox that night.

=== Critical response ===
Dennis Perkins of The A.V. Club gave the episode an A−, stating "An impeccably directed, character-driven story about children's fears and grown-up responsibility, the episode, credited to writer Carolyn Omine, is one of the most assured, human, and outright best Simpsons episodes in years."

Tony Sokol of Den of Geek gave the episode 4 out of 5 stars. He called the episode a return to form and highlighted the scene of Homer being brave for Lisa.

In 2019, Vulture named the episode the 56th best episode of the series to stream. In 2024, an updated ranking named it the 59th best episode of the series.

=== Awards and nominations ===
The episode received an Emmy nomination for Outstanding Animated Program at the 68th Primetime Creative Arts Emmy Awards. In addition, Re-Recording mixers Mark Linden and Tara Paul were nominated for a Primetime Emmy Award for Outstanding Sound Mixing for a Comedy or Drama Series (Half-Hour) and Animation for this episode at the same Emmy Awards ceremony.

Writer Carolyn Omine was nominated for a Writers Guild of America Award for Outstanding Writing in Animation at the 68th Writers Guild of America Awards for her script to this episode.

The episode won the Annie Award for Best General Audience Animated Television Broadcast Production at the 43rd Annie Awards.
