= The Marge-ian Chronicles =

- The Simpsons episode
- Episode no.: Season 27; Episode 16
- Directed by: Chris Clements
- Written by: Brian Kelley
- Production code: VABF09
- Original air date: March 13, 2016

Guest appearances
- Tom Scharpling as Paul; Jon Wurster as Barry; Brian J. Kaufman as Exploration Incorporated Candidate

Episode chronology
← Previous "Lisa the Veterinarian"	Next → "The Burns Cage"
- The Simpsons season 27

"The Marge-ian Chronicles" is the sixteenth episode of the twenty-seventh season of the American animated television series The Simpsons, and the 590th episode of the series overall. The episode was directed by Chris Clements and written by Brian Kelley. It aired in the United States on Fox on March 13, 2016.

In this episode, Lisa volunteers to help establish a human colony on Mars, so the family joins her to ensure her well-being. Tom Scharpling and Jon Wurster guest starred. The episode received mixed reviews.

== Plot ==
When Homer learns that Ned Flanders has been raising a flock of chickens in a backyard coop, he and Bart begin stealing the eggs they lay. Although he buys some chickens of his own to have a ready supply of eggs on hand, he and Bart realize that they preferred stealing from Flanders. The family finds a company called Exploration Incorporated that will take in the chickens, as part of a corporate-sponsored research project to establish space flight to Mars. Learning that the company wants to begin colonizing the planet within 10 years, Lisa eagerly volunteers. The rest of the family disagrees with her choice, but Homer persuades Marge to sign up as well in the hope that Lisa will lose interest and drop out. When this strategy fails, the entire family signs up.

The Simpsons and several other candidates are put into a simulated habitat for a week to evaluate their response to conditions they may face on Mars. Homer and Bart are dismissed at the end of the week for their slovenliness and stupidity; Marge, on the other hand, proves to be highly skilled at the required tasks due to her experience as a homemaker and mother. She and Lisa are both chosen as finalists, leading to a heated confrontation between the two, while Homer and Bart offer vague support and reflect on their own dysfunctional history.

Paul and Barry, the project leaders, announce that a rival company is close to completing its preparations to go to Mars and move the initial launch up to Thursday. All of the finalists except for Marge and Lisa drop out, but these two stubbornly remain in the program to the dismay of Bart and Homer. During the final launch sequence, they reconcile and decide that they no longer want to go to Mars, but it is too late to call off the mission. When the countdown reaches zero, the engines do not ignite and the rocket does not move. Paul and Barry admit that the launch was a fake, intended both to inspire a new generation and to create a distraction so they could abandon the project and flee; however their car has failed to start.

At home, Lisa comments to Marge that they almost went to Mars out of sheer stubbornness, to which Marge explains that this is what a mother-daughter relationship is. The episode ends with a glimpse into the year 2051, 35 years in the future, with Marge and Lisa now living on Mars and arguing over Lisa's desire to move to Venus. During the credits, Paul and Barry drive away from the launch site and begin planning a new business venture.

== Production ==
Comedian Tom Scharpling from The Best Show with Tom Scharpling and partner Jon Wurster were cast as the scientists in charge of the expedition to Mars. The previous year, Scharpling made a pitch to replace Harry Shearer when it was reported that he would not be returning for this season. Shearer later returned after signing a new deal.

== Cultural references ==
The Exploration Inc. company is a parody of the Mars One organization that was attempting a mission to Mars paid by sponsors. Homer mentions the time he went to space as shown in the fifth season episode "Deep Space Homer."

== Reception ==
"The Marge-ian Chronicles" scored a 1.3 rating and was watched by 3.07 million viewers, making it Fox's highest rated show of the night.

Dennis Perkins of The A.V. Club gave the episode a B− stating, "'The Marge-ian Chronicles' references one of the craziest, while appearing prepared to go that one crazier. As it turns out, the episode’s promise of Marge and Lisa being shot into space (Mars, as it happens) is something of a bait-and-switch, a fact that leaves it in the mushy middle. Not daring enough to go for broke (and not hilarious enough to pull that off), it, instead, settles for a human story with a couple of lousy lessons...'The Marge-ian Chronicles' dances around the possibility of tossing Marge and Lisa up into space too, then backs away, then seems prepared to go for it, before the anticlimactic rug-pulling that the corporate-funded private space exploration concern Exploration Incorporated never had the knowhow to send people to Mars in the first place."

Tony Sokol of Den of Geek gave the episode 4 out of 5 stars. He stated that the episode was funny, and highlighted the Exploration Inc. scientists.

== See also ==
- Mars One
