= John Brancato and Michael Ferris =

American screenwriting duo

John Brancato
- Born: John Dominic Brancato; United States
- Education: Harvard University
- Occupation: Screenwriter
- Years active: 1990–present

Michael Ferris
- Born: United States
- Education: Harvard University
- Occupation: Screenwriter
- Years active: 1990–present

John Dominic Brancato and Michael Ferris are a former American screenwriting duo, whose notable works include The Game, Terminator 3: Rise of the Machines, Terminator Salvation, Surrogates and The Hunter's Prayer. Brancato and Ferris met while at college, where both were editors of The Harvard Lampoon. The two have also been credited pseudonymously under the names Henry Dominic and Henry Dominick. Their partnership ended in 2015. Ferris has since separately written two episodes of The Simpsons, "Paths of Glory" and "From Russia Without Love", and the video game adaptation Dead Rising: Endgame. Brancato has since received a writing credit on the Netflix original film, Trigger Warning.

== Filmography ==
=== Film writers ===
- Watchers II (1990)
- Bloodfist II (1990) (John Brancato's uncredited story role)
- Femme Fatale (1991)
- Into the Sun (1992)
- Interceptor (1992)
- The Net (1995)
- The Game (1997)
- Terminator 3: Rise of the Machines (2003)
- Catwoman (2004)
- Primeval (2007)
- Terminator Salvation (2009)
- Surrogates (2009)
- The Hunter's Prayer (2017)
- Trigger Warning (2024)

Credited as Henry Dominic

- The Unborn (1991)
- Severed Ties (1992)
- Mindwarp (1992)

=== Television ===
Year	Title	Writers	Executive Producers	Notes
1991	Flight of Black Angel	Yes	No	TV movie
1991	Married... with Children	Yes	No	Episode "You Better Shop Around: Part 1"
1995	Æon Flux	Yes	No	Episode "The Demiurge"
2000	The Others	Yes	Yes	Also creators
