= Annie Award for Best General Audience Animated Television Broadcast Production =

Annual US television award

- Awarded for: Excellence in television animation for general audience
- Country: United States
- Presented by: ASIFA-Hollywood
- First award: 2011
- Currently held by: Common Side Effects (2025)
- Website: annieawards.org

The Annie Award for Best General Audience Animated Television Broadcast Production is an Annie Award, awarded annually to the best adult animated television/broadcasting productions.

The categories for television/broadcasting productions have gone through several name changes and divisions:

- From 1992 to 1997, there was only one award named Best Animated Television Program
- In 1998, the award was split into two categories, Outstanding Achievement in an Animated Daytime Television Program and Outstanding Achievement in an Animated Primetime or Late Night Television Program, but was eventually combined into one category again.
- In 2001, the award received an offshoot category, the Best Animated Television Production for Children award, though the category was not presented regularly until 2007.
- In 2011, the awards for television productions were split into their current division based on the audience of the program, establishing three categories, Best General Audience Animated Television Production, Best Animated Television Production for Children and Best Animated Television Production for Preschool.

== Winners and nominees ==
=== 2010s ===
Year	Program	Episode	Studios	Network
2011 (39th)
2011 (39th)	The Simpsons		Gracie Films	Fox
2011 (39th)	Archer		FX Productions	FX
2011 (39th)	Green Lantern: The Animated Series		Warner Bros. Animation	Cartoon Network
2011 (39th)	Mad		Warner Bros. Animation	Cartoon Network
2011 (39th)	Star Wars: The Clone Wars		Lucasfilm Animation, Ltd.	Cartoon Network
2011 (39th)	Hoops & Yoyo Ruin Christmas		Hallmark	CBS
2011 (39th)	Mary Shelley's Frankenhole	Season 2	Starburns Industries, Inc.	Adult Swim
2011 (39th)	Prep & Landing: Naughty vs. Nice		Walt Disney Animation Studios	ABC
2012 (40th)
2012 (40th)	Robot Chicken DC Comics Special		Stoopid Buddy Stoodios	Adult Swim
2012 (40th)	Archer	"Space Race, Part 1"	Floyd County Productions and FX Productions for FX	FX
2012 (40th)	Bob's Burgers	"Ear-sy Rider"	20th Century Fox TV	Fox
2012 (40th)	Motorcity	"Blond Thunder"	Disney Television Animation	Disney XD
2012 (40th)	Mad	"FrankenWinnie/ParaMorgan"	Warner Bros. Animation	Cartoon Network
2012 (40th)	South Park	"Raising the Bar"	Central Productions	Comedy Central
2013 (41st)
2013 (41st)	Futurama		The Curiosity Company in association with 20th Century Fox Television	Comedy Central
2013 (41st)	Archer		Floyd County Productions	FX
2013 (41st)	Bob's Burgers		Twentieth Century Fox Television	Fox
2013 (41st)	Tron: Uprising		Disney Television Animation	Disney XD
2013 (41st)	Motorcity		Titmouse, Inc.	Disney XD
2014 (42nd)
2014 (42nd)	The Simpsons		Gracie Films in Association with 20th Century Fox Television	Fox
2014 (42nd)	Archer		FX Productions	FX
2014 (42nd)	Back to Backspace		Cartoon Network Studios	Cartoon Network
2014 (42nd)	Regular Show		Cartoon Network Studios	Cartoon Network
2014 (42nd)	Bob's Burgers		20th Century Fox Television	Fox
2014 (42nd)	Mike Tyson Mysteries		Warner Bros. Animation	Adult Swim
2014 (42nd)	Rick and Morty		Starburns Industries, Inc.	Adult Swim
2015 (43rd)
2015 (43rd)	The Simpsons	"Halloween of Horror"	Gracie Films in association with 20th Century Fox Television	Fox
2015 (43rd)	BoJack Horseman	"Brand New Couch"	The Tornante Company, ShadowMachine	Netflix
2015 (43rd)	Bob's Burgers	"Can't Buy Me Math"	20th Century Fox Television, Bento Box Entertainment	Fox
2015 (43rd)	Moonbeam City	"Quest for Aquatica"	Titmouse, Inc., Comedy Central	Comedy Central
2016 (44th)
2016 (44th)	Bob's Burgers	"Glued, Where's My Bob?"	Bento Box Entertainment	Fox
2016 (44th)	BoJack Horseman	"Fish Out of Water"	Tornante Productions, LLC for Netflix	Netflix
2016 (44th)	Long Live the Royals	"Punk Show"	Cartoon Network Studios	Cartoon Network
2016 (44th)	The Venture Bros.	"Hostile Makeover"	Titmouse, Inc.	Adult Swim
2016 (44th)	The Simpsons	"Barthood"	Gracie Films in Association with 20th Century Fox Television	Fox
2017 (45th)
2017 (45th)	Rick and Morty	"Pickle Rick"	Williams Street	Adult Swim
2017 (45th)	Big Mouth	"Am I Gay?"	Netflix	Netflix
2017 (45th)	BoJack Horseman	"Stupid Piece of Sh*t"	Tornante Productions, LLC for Netflix	Netflix
2017 (45th)	Robot Chicken	"Freshly Baked: The Robot Chicken Santa Claus Pot Cookie Freakout Special: Special Edition"	Stoopid Buddy Stoodios	Adult Swim
2017 (45th)	Samurai Jack	"XCIII"	Adult Swim	Adult Swim
2018 (46th)
2018 (46th)	BoJack Horseman	"The Dog Days are Over"	Tornante Productions, LLC for Netflix	Netflix
2018 (46th)	Bob's Burgers	"The Bleakening, Parts 1 and 2"	20th Century FOX Television/Bento Box Entertainment	Fox
2018 (46th)	Big Mouth	"The Planned Parenthood Show"	Netflix	Netflix
2018 (46th)	Human Kind Of	"Desperately Seeking Social Skills"	Cartuna for Facebook Watch	Facebook Watch
2018 (46th)	The Venture Bros.	"The Saphrax Protocol"	Titmouse, Inc. for Adult Swim	Adult Swim
2019 (47th)
2019 (47th)	BoJack Horseman		Tornante Productions, LLC for Netflix	Netflix
2019 (47th)	Harley Quinn		Warner Bros. Animation	DC Universe
2019 (47th)	Tuca & Bertie		Tornante Productions, LLC for Netflix	Netflix
2019 (47th)	Big Mouth		Netflix	Netflix
2019 (47th)	Undone		Tornante Company and Amazon Studios	Amazon Prime Video

=== 2020s ===
Year	Program	Episode	Studios	Network
2020 (48th)
2020 (48th)	Primal	"Coven of the Damned"	Cartoon Network Studios	Adult Swim
2020 (48th)	Close Enough	"Logan's Run'd" / "Room Parents"	Cartoon Network Studios	HBO Max
2020 (48th)	Harley Quinn	"Something Borrowed, Something Green"	Eshugadee Productions in association with Warner Bros. Animation	DC Universe
2020 (48th)	Rick and Morty	"The Vat of Acid Episode"	Rick and Morty LLC	Adult Swim
2020 (48th)	The Midnight Gospel	"Mouse of Silver"	Titmouse Animation, Netflix	Netflix
2021 (49th)
2021 (49th)	Arcane	"When These Walls Come Tumbling Down"	Riot Games, Fortiche, Netflix	Netflix
2021 (49th)	Bob's Burgers	"Fingers-loose"	20th TV, Bento Box Animation	Fox
2021 (49th)	Love Death + Robots	"Ice"	Blur Studio, Netflix	Netflix
2021 (49th)	Star Wars: Visions	"The Duel"	Kamikaze Douga	Disney+
2021 (49th)	Tuca & Bertie	"The Dance"	The Tornante Company	Adult Swim

Best Mature Audience Animated Television/Broadcast Production

Year	Program	Episode	Studios	Network
2022 (50th)
2022 (50th)	Bob's Burgers	"Some Like it Bot Part 1: Eighth Grade Runner"	20th Television, Bento Box Entertainment	Fox
2022 (50th)	The Simpsons	"Treehouse of Horror XXXIII"	Gracie Films, 20th Television Animation	Fox
2022 (50th)	Harley Quinn	"Batman Begins Forever"	Warner Bros. Animation	HBO Max
2022 (50th)	Rick and Morty	"Night Family"	Rick and Morty LLC	Adult Swim
2022 (50th)	Tuca & Bertie	"The Pain Garden"	The Tornante Company	Adult Swim
2023 (51st)
2023 (51st)	Blue Eye Samurai	"Pilot: Hammerscale"	A Netflix Series / 3 Arts Entertainment and Blue Spirit Productions	Netflix
2023 (51st)	Big Mouth	"The International Show"	Netflix	Netflix
2023 (51st)	Bob's Burgers	"Amelia"	20th Television Animation	Fox
2023 (51st)	Scavengers Reign	"The Signal"	Max in association with Titmouse Animation and Green Street	Max
2023 (51st)	Tomato Kitchen		Bilibili / Studio Reflection	Bilibili
2024 (52nd)
2024 (52nd)	Bob's Burgers	"They Slug Horses, Don't They?"	20th Television Animation	Fox
2024 (52nd)	Solar Opposites	"The What If?! Device"	20th Television Animation	Hulu
2024 (52nd)	South Park	"South Park: The End of Obesity"	MTV Entertainment Studios	Paramount+
2024 (52nd)	The Great North	"Aunt Misbehavin' Adventure"	20th Television Animation	Fox
2024 (52nd)	The Second Best Hospital in the Galaxy	"The Land of Sex and Death"	Amazon MGM Studios, Titmouse Studios	Amazon Prime Video
2025 (53rd)
2025 (53rd)	Common Side Effects	"Pilot"	Green Street Pictures, Bandera Entertainment and Williams Street Productions	Adult Swim
2025 (53rd)	Bob's Burgers	"Grand Pre-Pre-Pre Opening"	20th Television	Fox
2025 (53rd)	Haha, You Clowns	"Duncan Holds a Baby"	Williams Street Productions	Adult Swim
2025 (53rd)	Il Baracchino	"Claudia entra in un caffè"	Luckyred and Megadrago	Amazon Prime Video
2025 (53rd)	South Park	"Sermon on the ‘Mount"	Central Productions	Comedy Central

== Multiple wins and nominations ==
=== Programs with multiple wins ===
3 wins

- Bob's Burgers
- The Simpsons

2 wins

- BoJack Horseman

=== Programs with multiple nominations ===
11 nominations

- Bob's Burgers

5 nominations

- BoJack Horseman
- The Simpsons

4 nominations

- Archer
- Big Mouth
- Rick and Morty

3 nominations

- Harley Quinn
- South Park
- Tuca & Bertie

2 nominations

- Mad
- Motorcity
- Robot Chicken
- The Venture Bros.

== See also ==
- Primetime Emmy Award for Short-Format Animation
- Critics' Choice Television Award for Best Animated Series
- Primetime Emmy Award for Outstanding Animated Program
