= Chris Clements (animation director) =

American animation director

Chris Clements is an American animation director with The Simpsons. Prior to that, he was a character layout artist with the show. The second episode he directed, "The Haw-Hawed Couple", was nominated for a Primetime Emmy Award in 2007 for Outstanding Animated Program (Less Than One Hour).

== Episodes ==
- "Dude, Where's My Ranch?"
- "The Haw-Hawed Couple"
- "Papa Don't Leech"
- "Gone Maggie Gone"
- "Million Dollar Maybe"
- "Moms I'd Like to Forget"
- "The Great Simpsina"
- "The D'oh-cial Network"
- "A Totally Fun Thing That Bart Will Never Do Again"
- "A Test Before Trying"
- "Pulpit Friction"
- "Married to the Blob"
- "Luca$"
- "Walking Big & Tall"
- "Let's Go Fly a Coot"
- "The Girl Code"
- "The Marge-ian Chronicles" (co-written with Matthew Faughnan)
- "The Great Phatsby"
- "22 for 30"
- "The Girl on the Bus"
- "Bart vs. Itchy & Scratchy"
- "Todd, Todd, Why Hast Thou Forsaken Me?"
- "Highway to Well"
- "The Dad-Feelings Limited"
- "Uncut Femmes"
- "Top Goon"
- "Pin Gal"
- "Night of the Living Wage"
- "The Flandshees of Innersimpson"
- "Full Heart, Empty Pool"
- "Parahormonal Activity"
