= Lisa the Veterinarian =

- The Simpsons episode
- Episode no.: Season 27; Episode 15
- Directed by: Steven Dean Moore
- Written by: Dan Vebber
- Production code: VABF08
- Original air date: March 6, 2016

Guest appearance
- Michael York as Dr. Budgie

Episode features
- Couch gag: "Roomance" by Bill Plympton: The television and couch imagine themselves frolicking together, but when the television tries to jump toward the couch, the power cord stops it short in midair and it crashes to the floor.

Episode chronology
← Previous "Gal of Constant Sorrow"	Next → "The Marge-ian Chronicles"
- The Simpsons season 27

"Lisa the Veterinarian" is the fifteenth episode of the twenty-seventh season of the American animated television series The Simpsons, and the 589th episode of the series overall. The episode was directed by Steven Dean Moore and written by Dan Vebber. It aired in the United States on Fox on March 6, 2016.

In this episode, Lisa works as a veterinarian intern after saving a raccoon while Marge earns extra money cleaning up crime scenes. Michael York guest starred as Dr. Budgie. The episode received mixed reviews.

== Plot ==
The Simpsons are visiting an indoor water park, but seeing that one of the main attractions has a very long line, thanks to the other kids downloading an app to receive a ticket number for the ride, Bart, who did not use the app, decides to pull a prank, announcing that the pools are infested with fish that can swim up people's private parts, and the only cure for this is to roll naked on the snow. The prank causes huge panic, as all the visitors rush outside while Bart enjoys the ride.

In the middle of the clutter, a raccoon enters the park, but one of the employees shoots the animal with a taser gun. Lisa revives the raccoon by performing CPR and is hailed as a hero as a result. As she proves to be responsible with animals, Miss Hoover gives her the responsibility to take care of the class' pet hamster Nibbles during spring break. Realizing that being a veterinarian is her new calling, she volunteers as an intern on Dr. Lionel Budgie's clinic.

Later, Marge is stuck in traffic as the clean-up team is not able to reach a car accident scene (as they were stuck in traffic). Chief Wiggum convinces Marge to clean the street, and she does it remarkably well. Wiggum also invites Marge to make other crime scenes' clean ups, as they can keep all the money and jewelry they find. Back home, Marge realizes that their ceiling fan is old and unsafe, so she decides to do more clean up jobs to get money for a new fan, starting from cleaning the scene of a "suicide-murder". She earns enough money for a new fan and a police discount on cleaning supplies, but eventually, the body parts and the blood from cleaning up a bloated corpse end up traumatizing her. Meanwhile, Lisa is so thrilled by the emotion of saving animals that she has become more ignorant towards others. That is when Bart decides to remind her that she was so busy taking care of other people's pets that she forgot about her own class pet: Nibbles. He is extremely depressed and ill, and Budgie says that the only solution would be to perform heart surgery. However, Nibbles dies only a few seconds after the operation, saddening Lisa as she technically killed an animal by neglecting it.

Back home, Homer gets a call from Bart and Budgie informing him of Lisa's situation, and realizes that if he takes Marge to calm Lisa down about the deceased hamster, this could also put Marge's emotions back together. He uses reverse psychology to trick Marge into coming with him to the clinic, and she and Lisa do end up hugging each other and sobbing during their breakdown. The episode ends with Nibbles's funeral in school, with a video memorial with clips of past episodes with Nibbles.

== Production ==
In July 2015, Michael York was announced to be guest starring this season. Later, it was reported that he would play Dr. Budgie, and Lisa would be an intern at his office. York previously appeared in another role in the seventeenth season episode, "Homer's Paternity Coot."

== Reception ==
"Lisa the Veterinarian" scored a 1.3 rating and was watched by 3.09 million viewers, making it Fox's highest rated show of the night.

Dennis Perkins of The A.V. Club gave the episode a B− stating, "Lisa and Marge are the responsible ones in the Simpson household, so an episode about them both losing sight of their obligations makes some sense...The episode, too, is clever and offhand without actually being particularly funny...We’ve seen Marge and Lisa have epiphanies about how their individual obsessions and blind spots can let the people they care about down, and those are some of the most affecting moments in the show’s long history—while being some of the funniest at the same time...It might not be fair to penalize 'Lisa the Veterinarian' for not reaching those levels, but, especially in a season that’s had some of the most promising episodes of The Simpsons in years, it’s also a mark of respect. As those episodes have shown, all the elements are still in place (especially since Harry Shearer’s been lured back into the fold) for the show to reel off a quality episode at any time."

Tony Sokol of Den of Geek gave the episode 4 out of 5 stars. He stated that the episode was good and briskly funny even with the bittersweet ending. He noted that York was a perfect Dr. Budgie.
