= Waylon Smithers =

Fictional character from The Simpsons franchise

- The Simpsons character
- First appearance: "Homer's Odyssey"; January 21, 1990
- Created by: Matt Groening
- Designed by: Matt Groening
- Voiced by: Harry Shearer

In-universe information
- Full name: Waylon Joseph Smithers Jr.
- Gender: Male
- Occupation: Consummate executive and personal assistant to Mr. Burns at the Springfield Nuclear Power Plant
- Family: Waylon Smithers Sr. (deceased father); Mrs. Smithers (mother)
- Nationality: American

Waylon Joseph Smithers Jr., usually referred to as Mr. Smithers or simply Smithers, is a recurring character in the animated sitcom The Simpsons, voiced by Harry Shearer. His first appearance was in the episode "Homer's Odyssey", although his voice could be heard in the series premiere, "Simpsons Roasting on an Open Fire". He is the consummate executive and personal assistant of Springfield Nuclear Power Plant's owner, Mr. Burns, and is usually treated unfairly.

Smithers' loyalty and devotion to Mr. Burns was inspired from how numerous Fox executives and staff members acted towards Barry Diller. Smithers' first name (Waylon) was derived from that of puppeteer Wayland Flowers. The idea for Smithers' ambiguous sexual orientation came from Sam Simon. He proposed that Smithers should be gay and have an undying love for Mr. Burns. Smithers was colorized in his first appearance as black with blue hair. Matt Groening, in an interview with TMZ, said that this was a mistake but the producers did not have enough money to correct it.

== Sexual orientation ==
Smithers is the loyal, obedient and sycophantic assistant to Mr. Burns, and the relationship between the two is a frequent running gag. In many ways, Smithers represents the stereotype of a closeted gay man. Numerous allusions and double entendres about his orientation being homosexual are made, though some of the show's producers instead interpret him as a "Burns-sexual". There has been speculation throughout the series of Smithers' sexuality and in the season 27 (2016) episode "The Burns Cage", he officially came out as gay.

== Role in The Simpsons ==
Mr. Smithers is Mr. Burns's devoted executive assistant. His father, Waylon Smithers Sr., worked for Burns until he died of radiation poisoning after saving Springfield from a potential nuclear meltdown when Smithers was a baby. Smithers began thinking of Mr. Burns as his commander shortly after his birth. Up until 2016, he was not openly gay, but most people knew he was homosexual before he came out. It was revealed in a flashback that he was married to a woman once, but the two split up when Mr. Burns came between them. Smithers is shown to have a passionate and deep love for Mr. Burns, and his sexual orientation has been characterized by the writers of the show as "Burns-sexual". "He deserves his time," says the writer of "The Simpsons" about Smithers's gay love story in 2021.

Mr. Burns remained largely ignorant of Smithers's devoted adoration, much to Smithers's frustration. Mr. Burns himself has been involved with several women and, in "A Hunka Hunka Burns in Love", Smithers is noticeably disgusted when Mr. Burns starts looking for a female companion. Burns, for his part, views Smithers as somewhat of a lackey, albeit a highly valued one for his competence. He has "rewarded" Smithers's devotion with the future "honor" of being buried alive with him after he dies. Smithers has been shown to be somewhat dependent on his relationship with Burns. In "Homer the Smithers", Mr. Burns orders Smithers to take a vacation and Homer Simpson is hired as a temporary replacement. When Homer loses his temper and punches Mr. Burns in the face, Mr. Burns learns to become self-reliant and this results in Smithers being fired. Smithers decides that he needs to be Mr. Burns's assistant and eventually gets his job back. In the season 27 episode "The Burns Cage", Smithers attempts to admit his love to Burns, who interrupts to reaffirm his contempt for his assistant.

Smithers's official job at the power plant appears to be that of executive assistant, which he says is "actually about 2,800 smaller jobs", responsible for monitoring employee attendance, and is often a disciplinarian and has won dozens of employee-of-the-month awards. Smithers does appear to be one of the few people at the power plant who is seemingly competent at their job as opposed to the lazy, oafish underlings such as Homer Simpson and the senile Mr. Burns, who is often out of touch with the modern times. While some of his early appearances showed him to have a malicious side (he tried to get Homer fired over his insurance claim for a hair-growing product, and the only reason this failed is that Mr. Burns had sympathy for Homer due to his own incurable baldness and gave him his old job back), his overall characterization is fairly benevolent and he ultimately just wants the power plant to run well. He has often hinted at wanting to be promoted to the position of executive vice president, but Burns has repeatedly squashed this dream, while whimsically bestowing the vice presidency on a dog. Smithers has the largest collection of Malibu Stacy dolls in the world, and is the president of the Malibu Stacy fan club. In "Werking Mom", Smithers makes a silent cameo as a drag queen named 'The Mysterious Waylon'.

== Character ==
Smithers's initial (and only) appearance with a dark complexion, as seen in "Homer's Odyssey"

Mr. Smithers was partly based on how numerous Fox executives and staff members acted towards Barry Diller. The idea for Smithers's orientation was pitched by Sam Simon, who proposed that Smithers should be gay, but the writers should never draw too much attention to it and should try to keep it in the back of their heads. Jay Kogen said "Originally he was gay and black...But we thought it was too much so we just kept him gay." The script for "Blood Feud" originally featured Smithers saying "Just leave me enough to get home to my wife and kids", but the line had to be cut for time. Smithers is voiced by Harry Shearer, who is also the voice of Mr. Burns. Shearer is often able to perform dialogue between the two characters in one take. Dan Castellaneta occasionally fills in for Shearer at table reads and voices Smithers. The name Waylon, coined by Mike Reiss, was first used in "I Married Marge" and comes from the puppeteer Wayland Flowers.

Smithers made his first appearance in "Homer's Odyssey", which was the third episode of the first season, although he can be heard over a speaker in The Simpsons series premiere "Simpsons Roasting on an Open Fire". In his first visual appearance in "Homer's Odyssey", Smithers was mistakenly animated with the wrong color and was made darker than most characters by Gyorgyi Peluce, the color stylist. David Silverman has claimed that Smithers was always intended to be "Mr Burns' white sycophant", and the staff thought it "would be a bad idea to have a black subservient character" and so switched him to his intended color for his next episode. Silverman retconned this error by saying that Smithers had a tan from a recent holiday in the Caribbean. The first appearance of a yellow Smithers was "There's No Disgrace Like Home", the fourth episode of the first season.

== Development ==
Mr. Smithers's relationship with Mr. Burns has long been a running gag on The Simpsons. Smithers is an obedient and sycophantic assistant to Mr. Burns. There have often been strong hints about Smithers's true feelings for his boss, with one of the earliest references being in the season one episode "The Telltale Head". Smithers's sexual orientation has often come into question, with some fans claiming he is a "Burns-sexual" and only attracted to his boss, while others maintain that he is gay. During the Bill Oakley/Josh Weinstein era, they still tried to keep his sexuality unspoken and there was debate among the writers about his orientation. Al Jean, who thinks of Smithers as being a "Burns-sexual", felt that had Mr. Burns been a woman, then Smithers would not be gay. David Silverman, a former supervising director has said, "[Smithers] seems to be focused on one particular human, as opposed to anything beyond that. [Rather than being gay], he's sort of 'Burns-sexual'." In a 2006 study conducted by the Gay & Lesbian Alliance Against Defamation, it was determined that nine of the 679 lead and supporting characters on scripted broadcast television were gay or lesbian, but Smithers was not included. A list published in 2008 by the same organization included Smithers; Patty Bouvier, Marge Simpson's lesbian sister, was included on both lists.

Smithers dreams about Mr. Burns in "Marge Gets a Job". The censors had issues with the "lump in his bed", which was his knee.

The debate is referenced in "The Simpsons 138th Episode Spectacular", when the episode host, Troy McClure is answering viewer questions, and one that is asked is "What is the real deal with Mr. Burns's assistant Smithers? You know what I'm talking about." A montage of various clips that shows Smithers's lust for Mr. Burns follows, and in the end, McClure says "as you can see, the real deal with Waylon Smithers is that he's Mr. Burns's assistant. He's in his early forties, is unmarried, and currently resides in Springfield. Thanks for writing!"

Several of the allusions to Smithers's sexuality have turned into battles with the network censors. For example, in Smithers's fantasy of a naked Mr. Burns popping out of a birthday cake in "Rosebud", the censors had not wanted Mr. Burns to be naked. Another example is "Marge Gets a Job", which has a dream sequence where Smithers is sleeping and Burns flies through a window. The sequence shows Burns flying towards him and Smithers looking happy, but originally it went on for a few seconds longer. It had to be trimmed down due to scenes that showed "Mr. Burns land[ing] in a particular position on Smithers's anatomy". There were also issues with "the lump in his bed", which the animators said had been drawn as his knee, but the censors had misinterpreted.

In the second season, the writers started to enjoy writing about Smithers and Burns' relationship, and the writers often pitched episodes with them as the focus, but many never came to fruition.

Mostly in the early seasons, Smithers had a catchphrase, which comes from a recurring joke that Mr. Burns never remembers who Homer Simpson is. Smithers and Burns would watch Homer (usually over a security camera feed) and Burns would ask, "Who is that man?", to which Smithers would reply, "That's Homer Simpson, sir, one of your [drones, organ banks, carbon blobs, etc.] from sector 7G." Burns would invariably respond, "Simpson, eh?"

In September 2015, it was confirmed by Jean that Smithers would come out to Mr. Burns in a season 27 episode. Though in the end he never came out to Mr. Burns as his attempt was cut short. The episode, "The Burns Cage", was broadcast the following April and saw Smithers unsuccessfully try to move on from Burns. A writer for British progressive magazine the New Statesman felt that the episode was a retcon, making a serious story about the character's homosexuality instead of the previous jokes and innuendo that were now considered homophobic.

== Reception ==
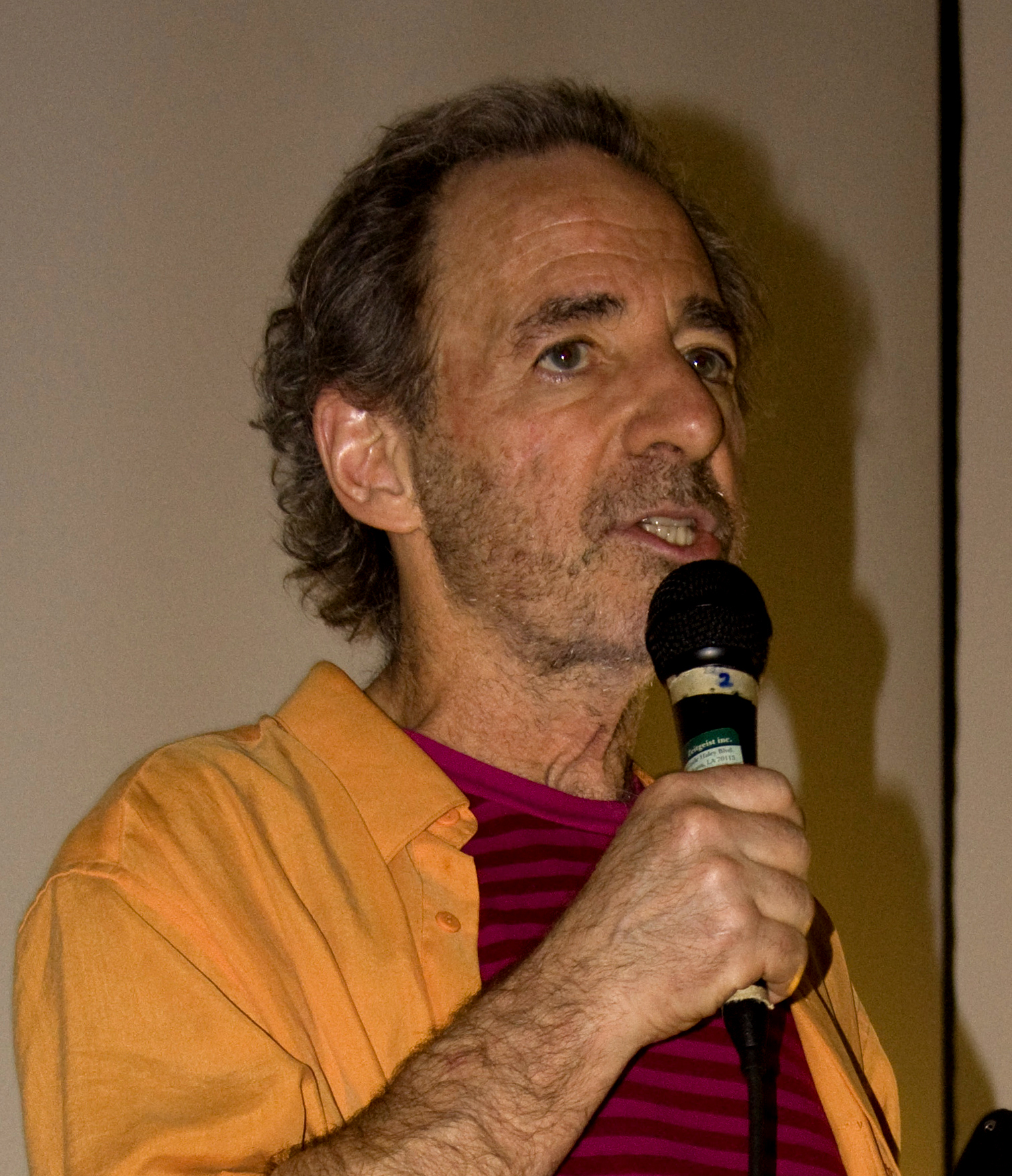
Smithers' voice actor Harry Shearer

In 2004, The Simpsons producers announced that one of their characters was going to come out of the closet. Speculation on who it would be was printed in newspapers throughout the United States and Canada (even claiming Smithers's "sexual orientation was about the worst-kept secret in Springfield") as well as in Australia, New Zealand, Ireland, (the Irish Independent called Smithers "too obvious" a choice), and the United Kingdom. Despite Matt Groening joking that it would be Homer, the Boston Herald calculated the odds of several characters being gay, with Smithers at a million to one. PlanetOut Inc. hosted an online poll in the weeks prior to the episode to determine based on "cartoon gaydar" who was gay on the Simpsons, with 97% of the respondents choosing Smithers. Jenny Stewart, the entertainment editor at the site said of the poll, "We've never had such an avalanche of people voting in any of our polls as we did on The Simpsons." It was Patty Bouvier who came out.

In a 2007 article, Entertainment Weekly named Smithers the 16th-greatest sidekick of all time. They have also described Smithers and Mr. Burns as being "TV's most functional dysfunctional couple". Star News Online named "Smithers' fey way" as one of the 400 reasons why they loved The Simpsons. In a 2003 article, Entertainment Weekly named the two-part episode "Who Shot Mr. Burns?", in which Smithers was prominently featured, the series' 25th-best episode. Gay.com ranked Smithers as the sixth-gayest cartoon character.

== Merchandise ==
Smithers was made into an action figure, and four different versions were included as part of the World of Springfield toy line. The first shows Smithers in his normal attire with a picture of Mr. Burns at his feet and was released in 2000 as part of "wave two". The second, released in 2002 as part of "wave ten", is called "resort Smithers" and shows him dressed as he was at the resort in the episode "Homer the Smithers". In 2003, a series of figures exclusive to Electronics Boutique was released, and a set of one Mr. Burns figure and two different Smithers toys based on the episode "Rosebud" were included. One, called "Bobo Smithers" shows Smithers dressed as Mr. Burns's teddy bear Bobo; and the other, known as "future Smithers", shows him as a robotic dog. A "future Burns" was included in the set as a companion to "future Smithers" and depicts Burns as a robot as he appeared at the end of the episode.

In 2015, Lego released a second series for their Simpsons Lego Minifigures theme. The second series features Smithers.
