= David Mason =

David or Dave Mason may refer to:

== Music ==
- David Mason (trumpeter) (1926–2011), British musician
- Dave Mason (1946–2026), British musician, member of Traffic
- Dave Mason (Australian musician) (born c. 1954), Australian rock singer-songwriter, member of The Reels

== Politics ==
- David H. Mason (1818–1873), American attorney and Republican politician
- David Mason (burgess) (1731–1792), planter and patriot who served in Virginia General Assembly and led the 15th Virginia Regiment
- Sir David Mason (businessman) (1862–1940), Lord Provost of Glasgow 1926 to 1929
- David Marshall Mason (1865–1945), UK politician
- David M. Mason (born 1957), member of the Federal Election Commission

== Sports ==
- Dave Mason (rugby league) (c. 1889–1966), New Zealand rugby league footballer
- Dave Mason (footballer) (1913–1983), English association footballer
- Dave Mason (American football) (born 1949), American football player
- Davey Mason (born 1998), American soccer player
- David Mason (speedway rider) (born 1976), British speedway rider

== Other ==
- David Mason (art dealer) (born 1939), London art dealer and Thalidomide parent activist
- David S. Mason (born 1947), professor of political science
- David A. Mason (born 1957), professor of cultural tourism and author of books about Korea
- David Mason (writer) (born 1954), American writer
- David Mason (murderer) (1956–1993), American serial killer
- David Mason (mason) (1931–2020), American stone-wall mason
- David Mason, Australian adventurer; see List of people who have walked across Australia § David Mason
- David Mason, protagonist of the video game Call of Duty: Black Ops II

== See also ==
- David Masson (disambiguation)
- Mason (surname)
