= Daegan =

Daegan may refer to:

- Baekdu-daegan, the mountain range and watershed crest line of the Korean Peninsula
- Daegan, a name for some government post in Goryeo and Joseon
