= Hollym =

Hollym may refer to:

- Hollym (publishing house)
- Hollym, East Riding of Yorkshire, England
