= E My Sports =

- The Simpsons episode
- Episode no.: Season 30; Episode 17
- Directed by: Rob Oliver
- Written by: Rob LaZebnik
- Production code: YABF09
- Original air date: March 17, 2019

Guest appearances
- Ken Jeong as Korean Monks; Natasha Lyonne as Sophie; David Turley as Conflict of Enemies Commentator

Episode chronology
← Previous "I Want You (She's So Heavy)"	Next → "Bart vs. Itchy & Scratchy"
- The Simpsons season 30

"E My Sports" is the seventeenth episode of the thirtieth season of the American animated television series The Simpsons, and the 656th episode overall. The episode was directed by Rob Oliver and written by Rob LaZebnik. It aired in the United States on Fox on March 17, 2019.

In this episode, Homer coaches Bart and his team in a computer game tournament when he learns there is prize money involved. Ken Jeong, Natasha Lyonne, and David Turley guest starred. The episode received mixed reviews.

== Plot ==
The Simpson family is peacefully enjoying some board games with Patty and Selma on a rainy day, which they all find strange until they realize it is because Bart is not with them. Homer reveals that he bribed Bart into behaving better by buying him a gaming computer after Bart jammed the ice cream machine at a mall food court. Bart has been using the computer to play a game called Conflict of Enemies with Milhouse, Sophie, Nelson, and Martin. At Marge's insistence, Homer attempts to get Bart to play less, but when he realizes they are playing for a $1,000 prize, he relents. The team wins, and when Homer learns they qualified for a tournament with a $500,000 grand prize, he allows Bart to continue playing the game.

Homer becomes the team's coach. He convinces Marge to let Bart continue gaming and hires a video game expert to improve the team's video game skills. Homer has a dream where he joins a club of fathers with children who are famous athletes. The team beats a Canadian team to qualify for the world championship in Seoul. Learning that Homer and Bart are going to South Korea, Lisa begs Marge to bring her along to Seoul, seeing an opportunity to fulfill her desire to visit the Jogyesa Temple.

In Seoul, Homer tells Milhouse to step down from the team so that he can be replaced with a better player. At the monastery, the family creates salt mandalas and destroys them. The act teaches Homer the futility of material gain, and he sabotages the tournament by cutting off all power to the stadium. Bart is blamed by his angry teammates for costing them their shot at victory.

On the way home, Homer has another dream where the club of fathers rejects him.

== Production ==
In an interview with The Verge, Riot Games' co-head of e-sports Whalen Rozelle talked about the making of the episode: "As the show is a satirical comedy, we knew they would present their own take. While we were heavily involved as consultants, we were comfortable giving The Simpsons team full control over how they wanted to present e-sports in the show, given their tradition of excellence."

In the interview, Rob LaZebnik talked about the collaboration: "I remember reading that something like eighty million people viewed the 2017 World Championship play-in stage, which is more than the NBA finals. I also watched the Free to Play documentary, and it all felt ripe for Simpsonification.", and how they made it feel like the language and visuals feel "authentic", but also "to poke a bit of fun at some of the stereotypes people have about gamers.", like when the announcer talked about Bart not giving the GG to the other team.

LaZebnik told CNBC that e-sports were inevitable because of the ubiquity of video games and how everyone is online and using smartphones. He said the episode represented a "cultural tipping point" about the future of sports and entertainment.

== Cultural references ==
The game Conflict of Enemies that the characters are playing is a parody of games such as League of Legends and DOTA 2. When the Simpson family is in South Korea, there are signs that say "BTS here today" and "BTS ARMY recruiting center" in English and Korean, referring to the South Korean boy band.

== Reception ==
=== Viewing figures ===
"E My Sports" scored a 0.8 rating with a 4 share and was watched by 2.08 million people.

=== Critical response ===
Dennis Perkins of The A.V. Club gave the episode a B−, stating, "If only because of the lessons provided by 30 years of pop cultural scrutiny, The Simpsons’ Esports episode, ‘E My Sports,’ avoids most of the most obvious pitfalls such a storyline suggests. Leading up to the episode, the overlapping group of Simpsons fans and avid gamers were publicly assured that the show had enlisted the folks at Riot Games to ensure that Bart's foray into the competitive gaming world didn't creak with old guy jokes about those kids and their blipping and their beeping, and so forth."

Tony Sokol of Den of Geek gave the episode 4 out of 5 stars. He called the episode "formidable and forward thinking."

The Korea Times had professor David A. Mason and history researcher Matt VanVolkenburg analyze the accuracy of the depiction of South Korea in the episode. VanVolkenburg criticized the used of the M*A*S*H theme music because the television series angered Koreans at the time for showing the country as "poor and war-torn." Mason thought the salt mandalas were only newly seen in South Korea and the Jogye Temple is not known for them. He also said many themes were generalized to East Asia and not Korean specific. VanVolkenburg also questioned why the episode needed to show South Korea.
