= Society of Joseon =

Society of Korea from 1392 to 1897

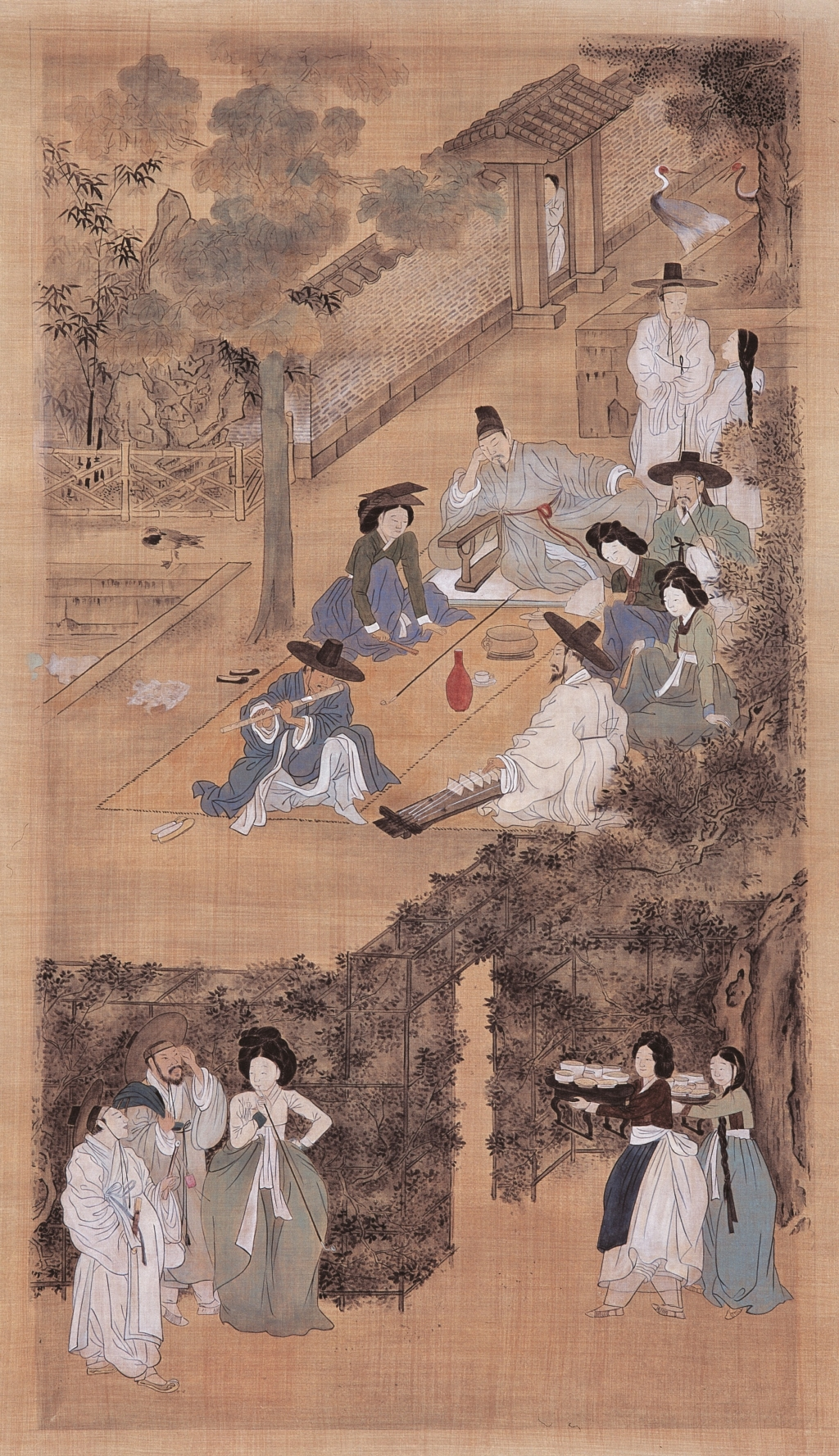
Korean scene in a painting from the 18th century. Elite Korean women used pearl powder to whiten faces. These are gisaeng, two listening politely to the music and one (bottom left) in discussion with two hatted yangban men. She is smoking a long pipe. Food is brought by two serving women for the seated yangban. Yangban men were not permitted to see the wives of other yangban.

Society in the Joseon dynasty was built upon Neo-Confucianist ideals, namely the three fundamental principles and five moral disciplines. There were four classes: the yangban nobility, the "middle class" jungin, sangmin, or the commoners, and the cheonmin, the outcasts at the very bottom. Society was ruled by the yangban, who constituted 10% of the population and had several privileges. Slaves were of the lowest standing.

During this period, the clan structure became stricter and bloodline was of utmost importance. Family life was regulated by law, strictly enforcing Confucian rituals. Compared to Goryeo practices before, marriage rituals were restructured and aggravated. Noblemen could have only one wife and several concubines but their children born from commoner or slave concubines were considered illegitimate and denied any yangban rights.

The roles and rights of women were reduced compared to previous eras in Korean history. Yangban women were completely hidden from the outer world and every woman had to conform to Confucian ideals of purity, obedience, chastity and faithfulness. Women were subjects of male dominance throughout their lives, obliged to listen to their fathers, husbands, fathers-in-law and firstborn sons. Homes were divided into male and female quarters to separate the sexes.

Life within the social hierarchy of the Joseon dynasty was not only structured, but deeply felt in everyday experiences. Although society was divided into distinct classes such as the yangban, commoners, and enslaved people, these divisions shaped nearly every aspect of daily life, including occupation, housing, clothing, and even personal relationships. Opportunities for upward mobility were beyond limited, and most individuals were expected to remain within the social status they were born into. As a result, social position often determined not just one’s economic stability, but also one’s sense of identity and belonging within the broader community. Education played a central role in maintaining this hierarchical structure, especially through the influence of Confucianism. Access to formal education and preparation for the civil service examinations was largely restricted to elite classes, particularly the yangban. These exams were one of the few recognized pathways to government positions and social prestige, but because of the time, resources, and connections required to succeed, they reinforced existing inequalities. In this way, education was not just about learning, but also functioned as a system that reproduced social status across generations. While Joseon society is often presented as stable and unchanging, it experienced gradual shifts over time. In later periods of the dynasty, economic developments such as increased trade and agricultural changes allowed some commoners to accumulate wealth, even if they could not officially change their class status. Additionally, systems like slavery began to decline, and new social dynamics started to emerge. These changes suggest that, although the structure of society remained rigid in theory, it was more fluid in practice than it may initially appear. The roles and expectations of women in Joseon society were strongly shaped by Confucian ideals, particularly in terms of family structure and gender hierarchy. Women were generally expected to prioritize obedience, modesty, and domestic responsibilities, especially within elite households. Women from different social classes often had varying degrees of responsibility and autonomy, with some participating in economic activities or managing household affairs in meaningful ways. These variations highlight that, even within a restrictive system, women actively navigated and adapted to the expectations placed upon them. Choi, D., & Kim, C. (2026). Meritocracy with multiple rules: How special civil service examinations reproduced privilege in Joseon Korea. Social Science History. Cambridge University Press. Kim, Y.-J. (2004). Confucian education in Joseon dynasty: Focusing on intellectual education and education for the whole man. Journal of Korean Thought and Culture, 26, 231–262.

== Guiding principles ==
Korean society was hierarchical during most of the Joseon era and the conscious, government-backed spreading of Neo-Confucianism reinforced this idea. Even though the philosophy originates in China, Korea also adopted and integrated it into daily life, transforming it to fit the nation's needs and developed it in a way that became specific to Korea.

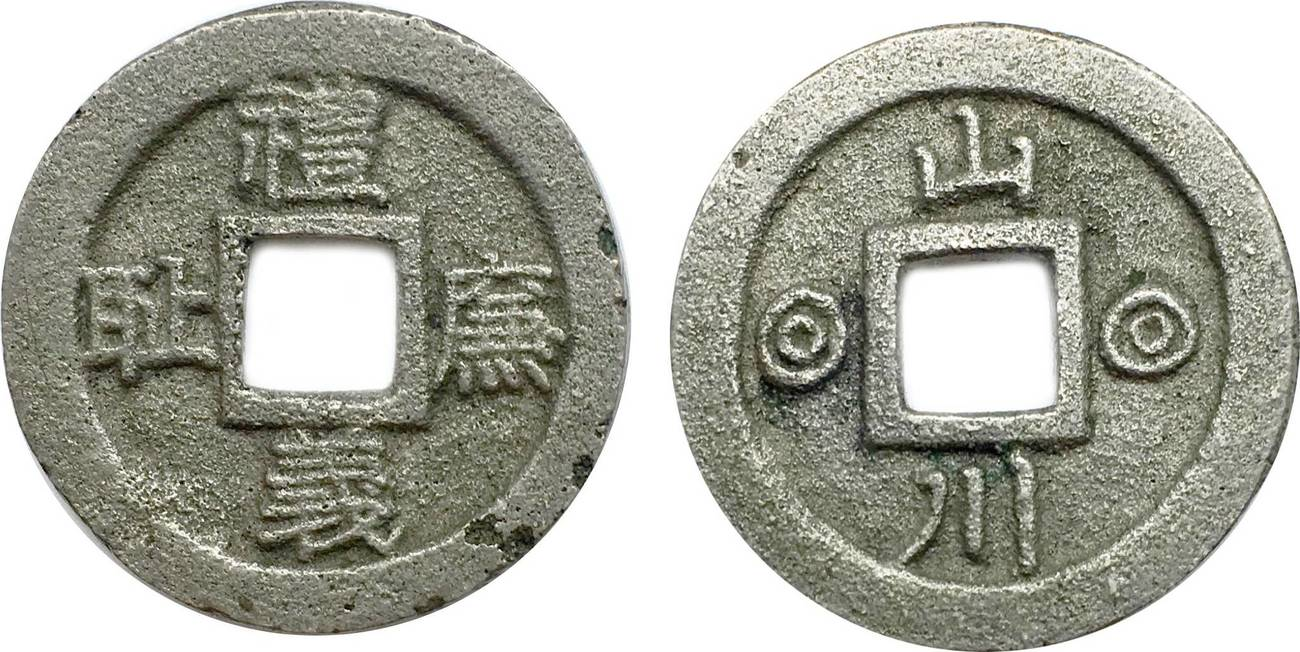
Joseon lucky coin celebrating characteristics to be cultivated in life. These virtues enable harmony between the social classes.

Korean society in Joseon was built upon the three fundamental principles (samgang, 삼강; 三綱) and five moral disciplines (oryun, 오륜; 五倫):

- samgang:
  - chung (충; 忠): loyalty to the king
  - hyo (효; 孝): filial obedience to the parents
  - yeol (열; 熱): differentiation between men and women
- oryun:
  - ui (의; 義): righteousness and justice: the relationship between monarch and the people
  - chin (친; 親): warmth and closeness between parents and children
  - byeol (별; 別): differentiation between husband and wife
  - seo (서; 序): order between seniors and juniors
  - sin (신; 信): trust between friends

This means that Korean society placed utmost importance on hierarchy between classes, older and younger people, emphasized family values, the keeping of order and harmony and the inferior social status of women. Rituals became very important. Ceremonies paying respect to one's ancestors and the need for lifelong learning being highly valued. Neo-Confucians considered hard work, purity, politeness and refraining from improper behaviour as desirable and valuable human qualities. They could be regarded as prudish, since showing passionate emotions was something noble people were expected to avoid. It was important that everyone knew their standings in society and behaved accordingly. The Korean language reflects this notion even today, by the use of honorifics, which signal whether the speaker addresses a senior person or someone of a higher social standing.

Direct communication between the king and the common people was possible through the sangeon (상언; 上言), a written petition system, and the gyeokjaeng (격쟁; 擊錚), an oral petition system. Through the gyeokjaeng oral petition system, commoners could strike a gong or drum in front of the palace or during the king's public processions in order to appeal their grievances or petition to the king directly. This allowed even the illiterate members of Joseon society to make a petition to the king. More than 1,300 gyeokjaeng-related accounts are recorded in the Ilseongnok.

== Structure ==
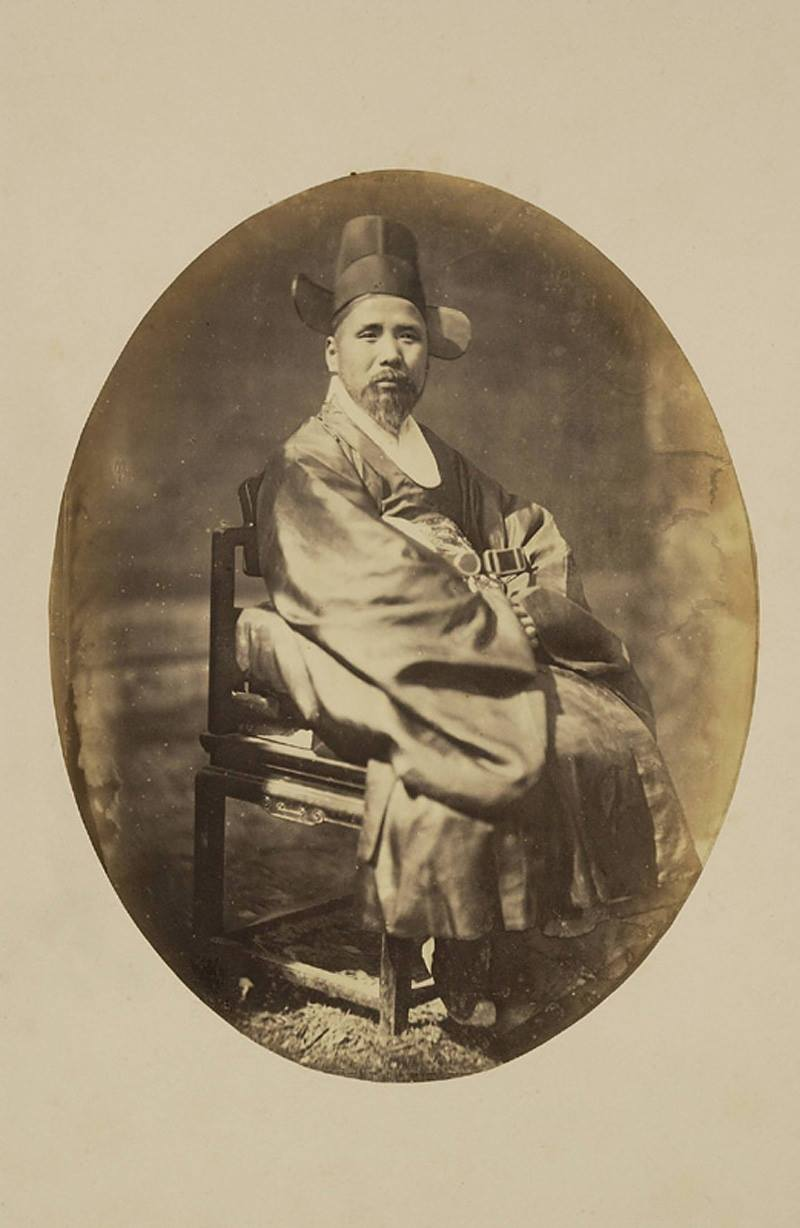
Photograph of a yangban man from 1863, diplomat appointed to the Chinese court. He wears the winged hat of an official, a shimmering silk gown and the waist buckle of a high-ranking official.

=== General ===
The basis of Joseon society was a system similar to caste systems. Historian Baek Ji-won considers the Korean system comparable to that of India. According to Michael Seth, the Korean system could, in principle, be compared to India's (apart from the religious connotations). In practice, however, classes may not have been as impenetrable and clearly separated as in India. Bruce Cumings, on the other hand, thinks that the Korean structure cannot be called a true caste system but a system where certain castes existed.

In theory, there were three social classes, but in practice, there were four. The top class were the yangban, or "scholar-gentry", the commoners were called sangmin or yangmin, and the lowest class was that of the cheonmin. Between the yangban and the commoners was a fourth class, the jungin, "middle people".

Joseon society is special in that the elite class remained the same for many centuries. While there were constant wars, with different groups changing in top positions throughout Europe and Asia, the Korean ruling class remained largely untouched, from Goryeo times to the end of the Joseon dynasty. The structure of the social system also remained the same for five centuries.

=== The yangban nobility ===
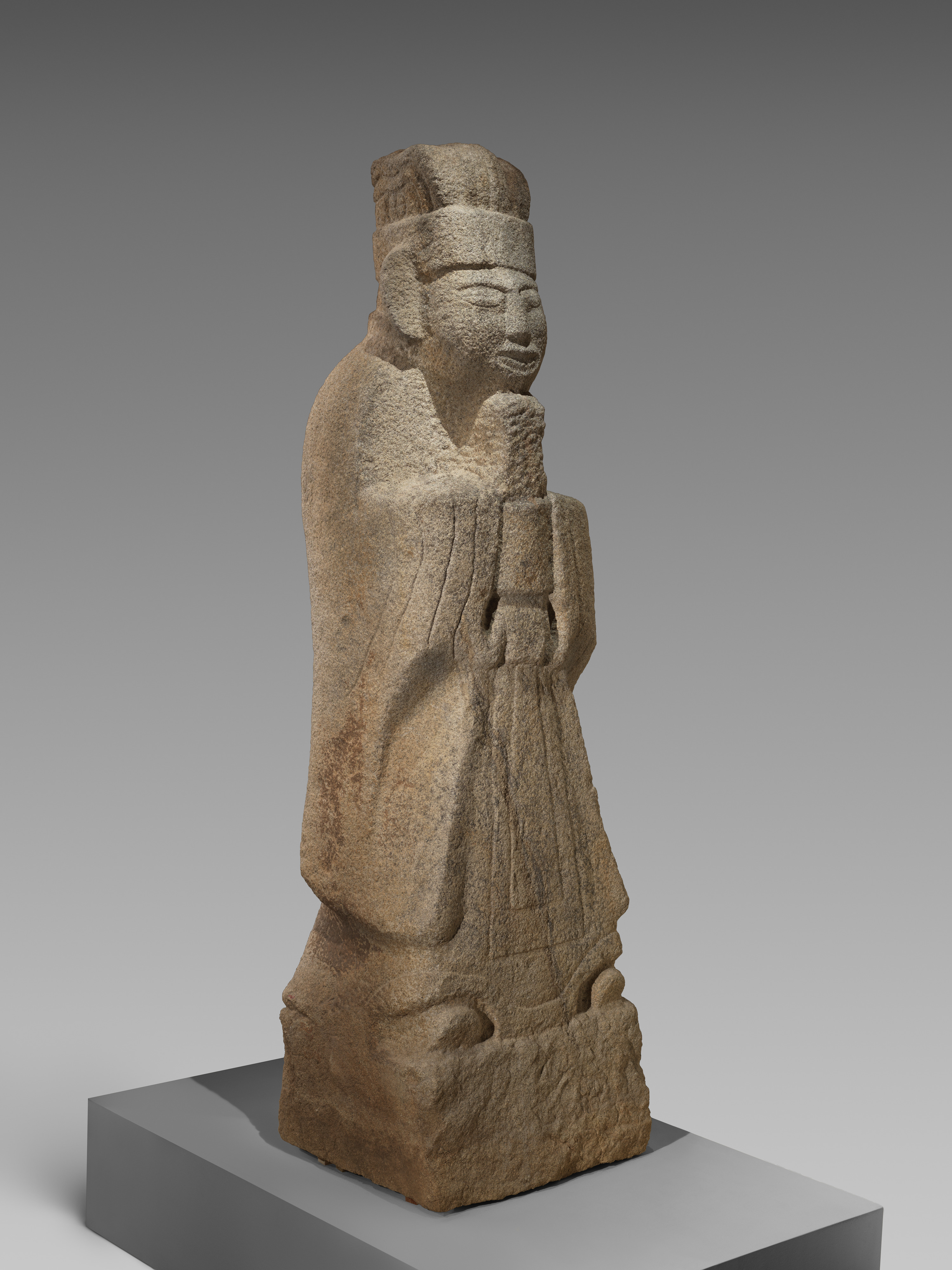
Figurine for guarding a tomb: civil official with robe of office, winged hat and tablet. (19th century)

The ruling class and the recipient of privileges was the yangban class. This elite aristocracy was hereditary and held most of the wealth, slaves and land. They were also called sadaebu, "scholar-officials", because when compared to Goryeo aristocracy or the Japanese bushido, they were not landowners who engaged in military actions.

Yangban strove to do well at the royal examinations to obtain high positions in the government. They did not pay any form of taxes, and they avoided manual labor and conscription. However they had to excel in calligraphy, poetry, classical Chinese texts, and Confucian rites. In theory, commoners could apply for royal exams but in practice, from the 1600s, the family background of applicants was thoroughly checked and had to provide evidence of yangban status on their father's side up to three generations and one generation on the mother's side.

Nobles lived separately from commoners, in designated areas of a town or village and spent most of their free time at Confucian academies or gisaeng houses. Yangban families were rare in the northern and eastern parts of the country and on Jeju Island and were mostly demoted yangban that were exiled there. High government positions were filled by yangban from Gyeongsang and Chungcheong provinces mainly. The scholar-aristocracy made up about 10% of Korea's population.

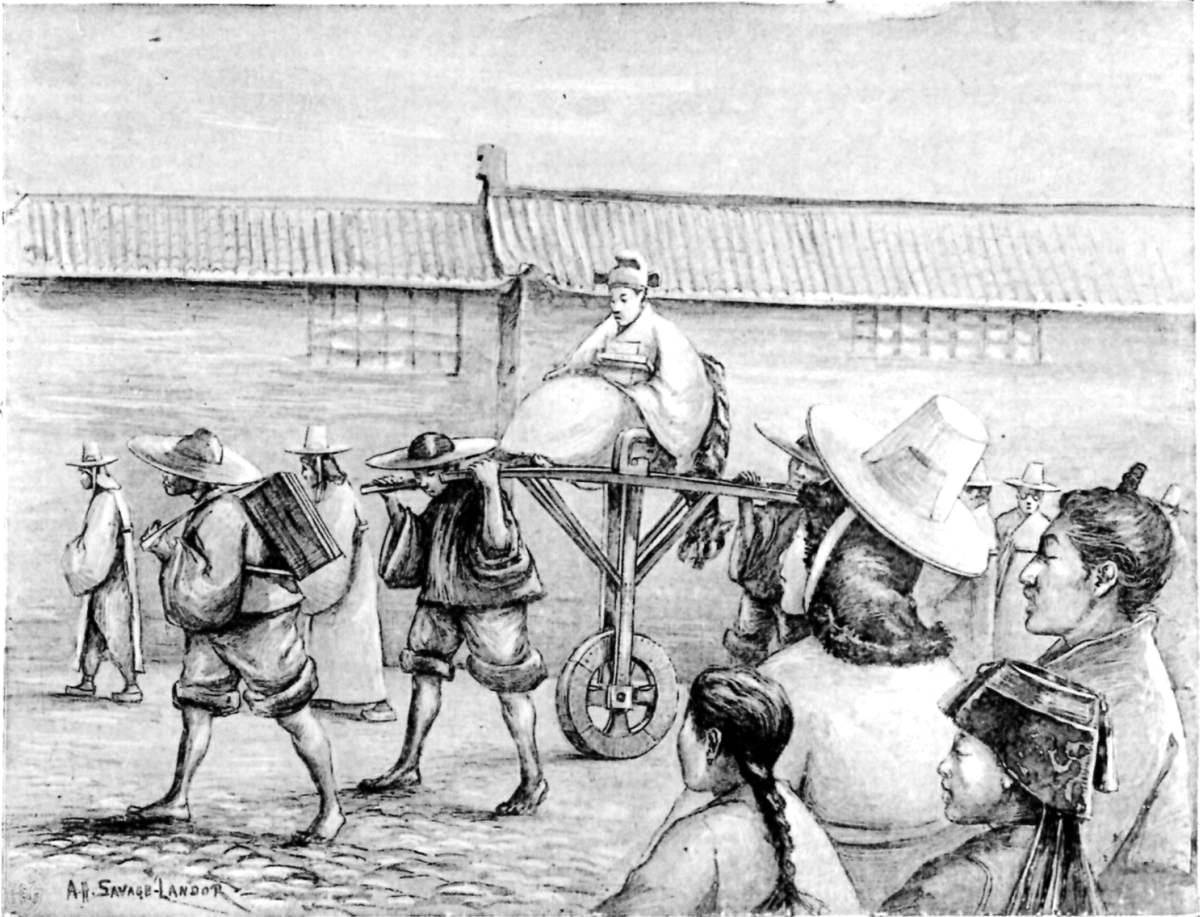
A Korean official going to Court in a monowheel chair (1895) by Arnold Henry Savage Landor. The official's superior status is emphasised by this means of transport.

Civilian offices (munban), as well as military posts (muban) were occupied by yangban men, with the latter being filled by provincial yangban, whose only way to obtain a scholarly certificate was to become military officials. The men were prepared for the exam by the muhak, the military schools. From the mid-Joseon period, they belonged to different lineages from the civilian officials.

With the rise of the Yangban class in the Joseon Dynasty, specifically around the 14th century, came the rise of sijo. Sijo was the specific form of poetry that Yangban nobles were meant to excel in. Sijo is often identified by its use of three lines that follow a pattern of a specific amount of syllables per line. The total amount of syllables ranges from 44-46, following a 3444/3, 3444/3, 3544 syllable pattern. The third line is longer than the first two and holds a surprise twist element. Yangban liked sijo as they saw it as a way to express philosophical and religious components. The Yangban, being the literate class of the early Joseon dynasty, were masters at creating sijo. The reason for the Yangban being the only literate class of the early Joseon period is because early Korean writing systems used Chinese characters. However during the 15th century of the Joseon Dynasty, King Sejong created hangul, which was made for commoners to be able to read and write. Hangul was a new system of consonants and vowels modeled after the shapes of the vocal organs when pronounced. He also included the philosophical concepts of heaven, earth, and human into the creation of hangul, ending with 28 characters in the new writing system. With the invention of Hangul, ordinary people who were not a part of the upper class were able to read and write, eventually being able to create sijo.

=== The jungin middle class ===
==== The seoeol illegitimate children of yangban ====
The jungin people also included the illegitimate children of yangban. Born from commoner or slave concubines, they made up a substrate within the jungin, called seoeol. The illegitimate children of the scholar-gentry were not allowed to be recognised as yangban and so could not inherit land or wealth from their fathers or participate in government exams. Their fate caused much discussion among Confucian scholars, as recognising their existence would have meant that the well-defined lines between commoners and nobility would have been blurred.

However, increasing numbers of Seoeols was recognized as a threat that during Seonjo of Joseon's reign, they were allowed to become officials. But these seoeols could not become ministers or high officials. However, the efforts of those people to abolish discrimination during the 19th century, did increase their social mobility and some, such as Yun Ung-nyeol or Yi Yun-yong, served as ministers.

==== Minor office holders and technocrats ====
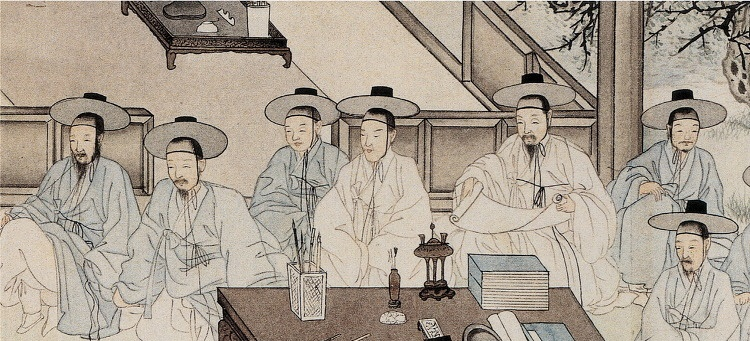
Painting depicting jungin people

The middle class, called jungin or chungin was a small but important one. They were below the yangban nobles but above the common people. They were usually "technical experts", such as interpreters, scribes, astronomers, accountants, physicians, jurists and musicians. Provincial small officeholders also belonged to this class. They oversaw local bureaucracy and so were impossible to overlook. Many of them became wealthy, some by exploiting peasants. In the 19th century, jungin who spoke foreign languages were the ones who introduced Western culture to Korea.

=== The sangmin commoners ===
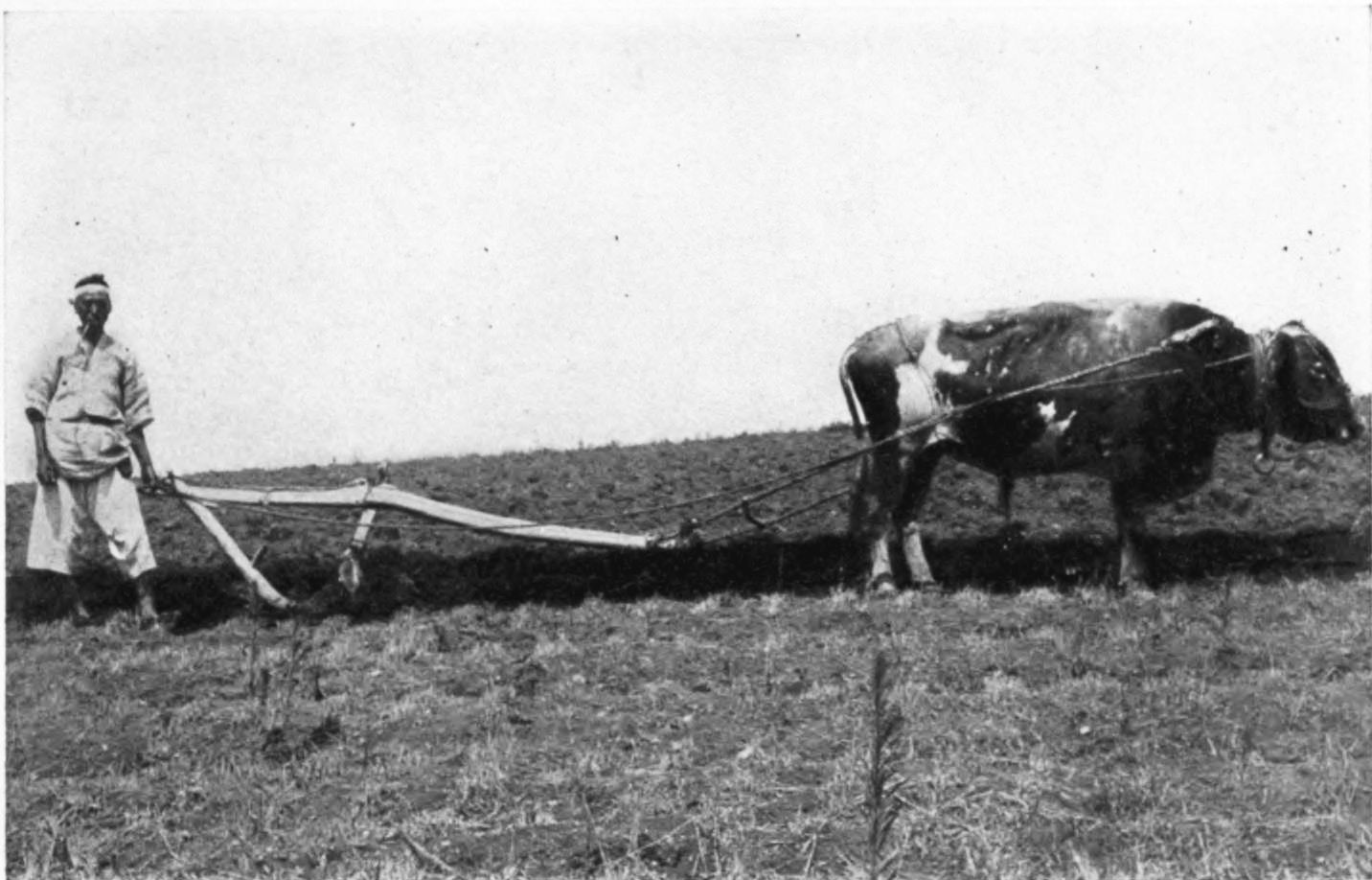
Ploughing done by a bullock with peasant guiding the plough. The mud of rice paddies was too much for other animals to cope with. Photo c1900

Around 80% of Joseon society was made up of commoners, called sangmin. They were a free class, obliged to pay taxes, serve in the army, and undertake corvée labour. Peasants, artisans, fishermen and merchants made up this class, but merchants were regarded as lowly by yangban. Some peasants owned their lands, but others cultivated yangban property as tenants.

=== cheonmin ===
The last place on the social ladder was the outsider class, the cheonmin. These fell into two groups: the free and the slaves.

==== Free groups ====
The free were essentially people outside Buddhist societal norms of acceptability. For example, professionals dealing with animal slaughter (butchers, people working with animal skins), most probably because of established Buddhist religious views. Innkeepers, gisaengs, entertainers, gravediggers, bark peelers, basket makers, shamans and ferrymen were also cheonmin people. It was a hereditary status, and their children were not allowed to advance on the social ladder.

==== Slaves ====
Slaves were divided into two groups: sanobi (private slaves) and gongnobi (slaves owned by the state). Both groups had "in-house slaves" (solgeo nobi) and "outside slaves" (oegeo nobi). The latter lived like any peasant, could own property and, just like peasants, gave a portion of the crop or textile tributes to their owners. This makes Korean history scholars debate whether they should even be considered slaves or serfs. The number of slaves fluctuated throughout the Joseon period: there were times when their numbers reached 30% of the population. Slaves could not have family names except for those who already had one when they became enslaved. So they could not invent their own last names. In theory, marriage between slaves and commoners was forbidden, but the rule was often ignored. By the end of the dynasty, the number of slaves declined. State slavery was abolished in 1800 while private slavery was finally banned in 1894.

== Clans, family and marriage ==
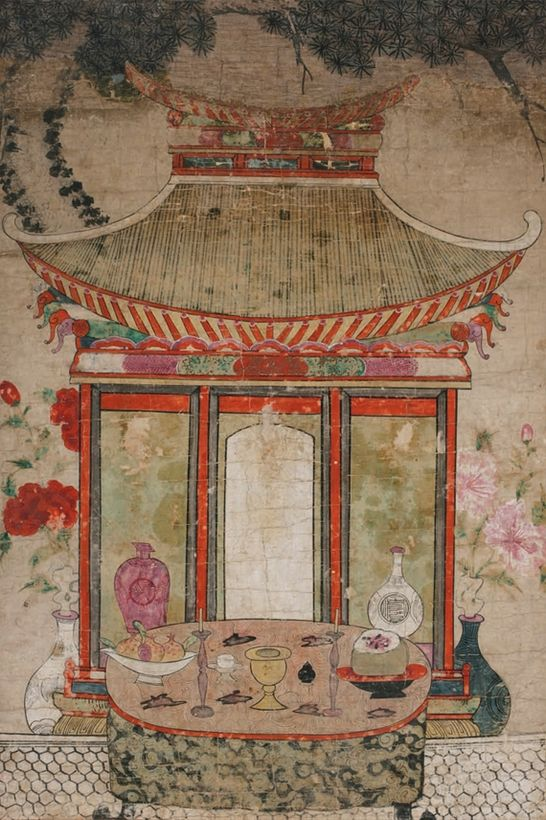
Tables set for jesa ceremonies depicted in an early Joseon painting

Korea has a clan system, where every Korean belongs to a bongwan (본관) that can trace ancestry back to the founding father of the clan. Different clans may share certain surnames, differentiated by the founding city or town of the clan. Clan structure had existed well before the founding of Joseon but the spread of Confucianism made its rules stricter, dogmatized in state laws.

Clans are based upon paternal blood lineage, named jok (족; 族), pa (파; 派) or munjung (문중; 門中). The history of the clan, with birth, marriage and death details of its members are registered in the jokbo (족보; 族譜) even today. This kind of registry making became regular in the 15th century. Traitors and sentenced criminals were expelled from the clan and from the lineage. Outsiders could not join a lineage. The names of Korean men were given relative to a common ancestor, whereby strangers could immediately ascertain whether and how they might be related.

Family life was regulated by the Gyeongguk daejeon (경국대전; 經國大典), a code of law compiled in the 15th century. It regulated the jesa, the ancestor rituals, emphasizing that ancestors are important members of a lineage. Jesa is conducted by the oldest male family member of the deceased, the other family members line up behind him according to their ranks in the family. Rituals have strict rules and pre-set orders, with the type of sacrificial food and its placement order defined, as well. These rituals became common and solidified during the Joseon era.

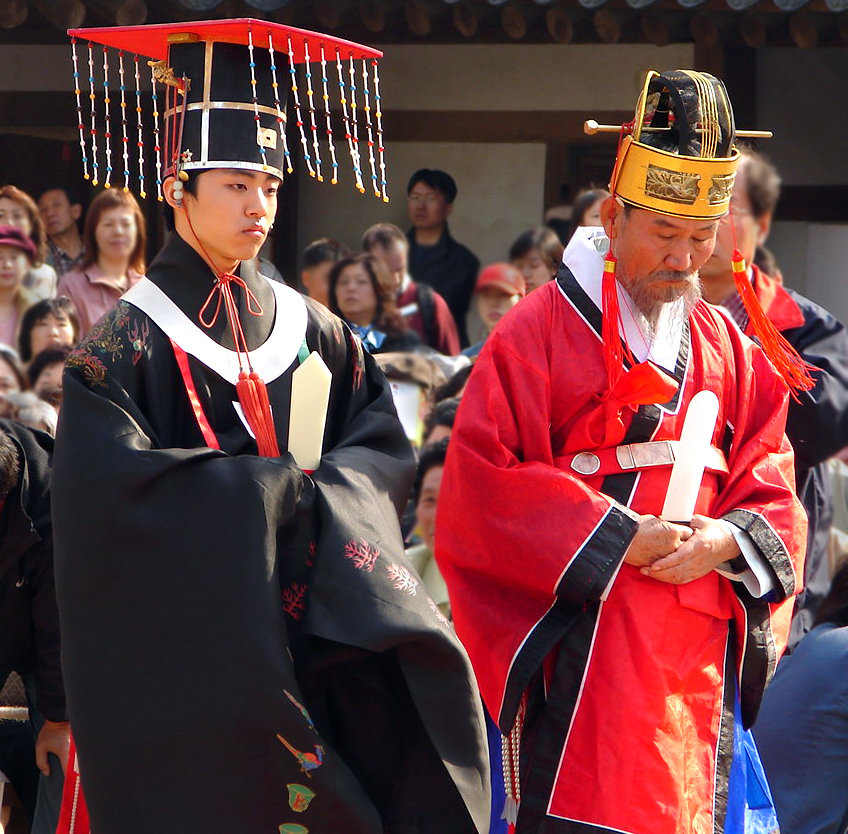
Royal wedding reenactment in the Unhyeon Palace in Seoul, with the "king" on the left

Just like rituals, marriage also had stern rules to follow. While in Goryeo marriage within members of the same clan was permitted, Joseon took exogamy very seriously and forbade such marriages that violated the sharing of the last name, even if a clan had more than a million members. Michael Seth, professor of history at the James Madison University, claims that the reason for this was the adaptation of the gwageo (과거), the government examination system of China, as well as the integration of Confucianism into everyday life, making proving one's lineage of utmost importance.

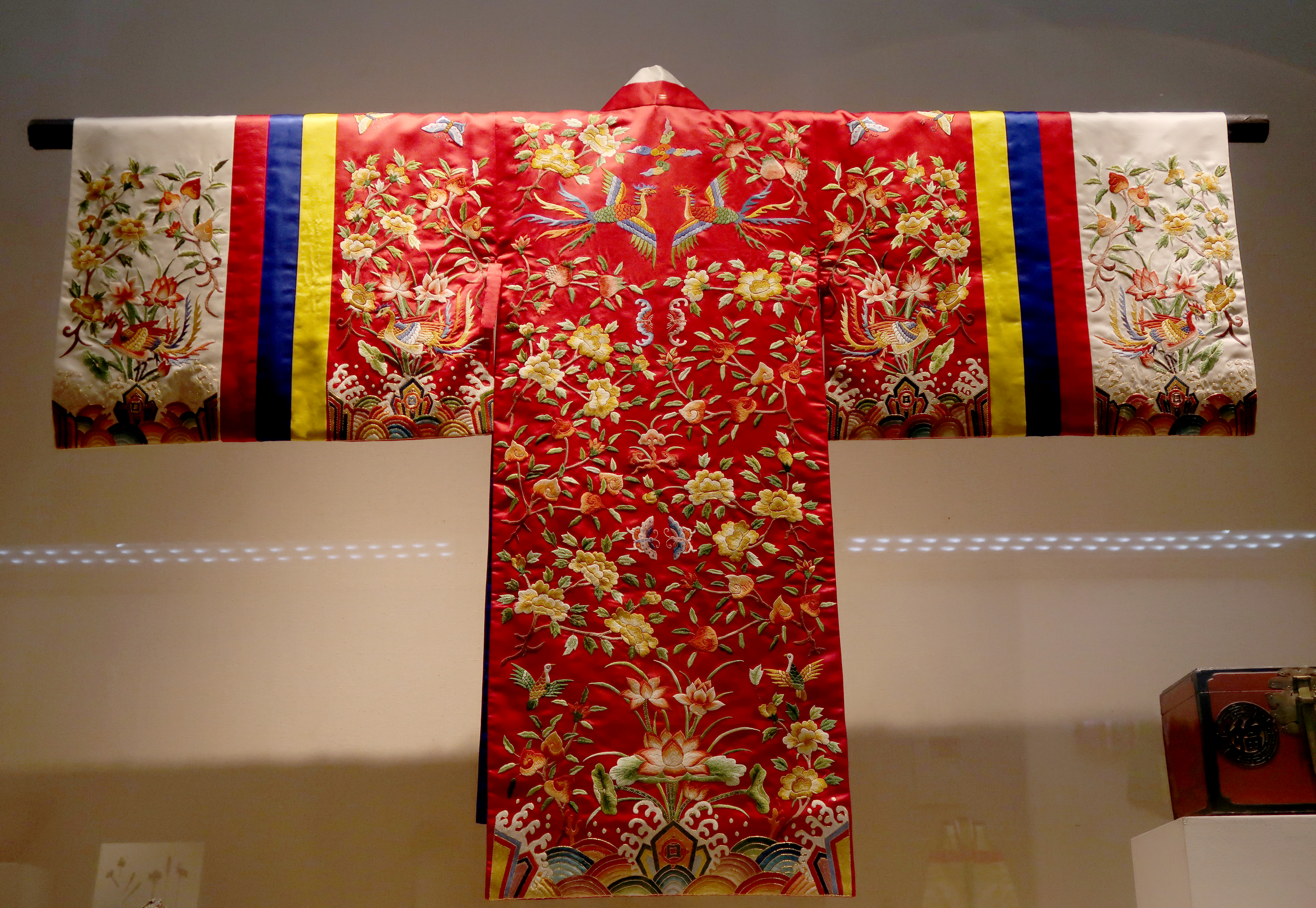
Late 19th century Joseon bridal robe, silk with embroidery.

Marriage was conducted at a young age, in 1471 the lowest possible age was 15 for boys and 14 for girls. Men usually got married before the age of 30, women were typically married below 20. Commoners usually married at an earlier age than yangban class children. Significant age difference between husband and wife was daily occurrence. Marriage and married life rituals were regulated by Zhu Xi's Zhuzi Jiali (Chinese: 朱子家禮, Korean: 주자가례, Juja garye), but customs were modified according to Korean traditions. For example, according to Confucian customs, wedding ceremonies were held at the house of the groom's father, however, in Korea the exact opposite had been the custom. As a compromise, a part of the ceremony was to be held at the bride's home, after which they would proceed to the groom's home. In Goryeo times, the newlyweds usually lived at the bride's home for years, but by adapting Confucianism this had to change. The bride had to move to her new family. In practice there were occasions when the couple chose to live where the parents had a bigger need of looking after or where land was more arable.

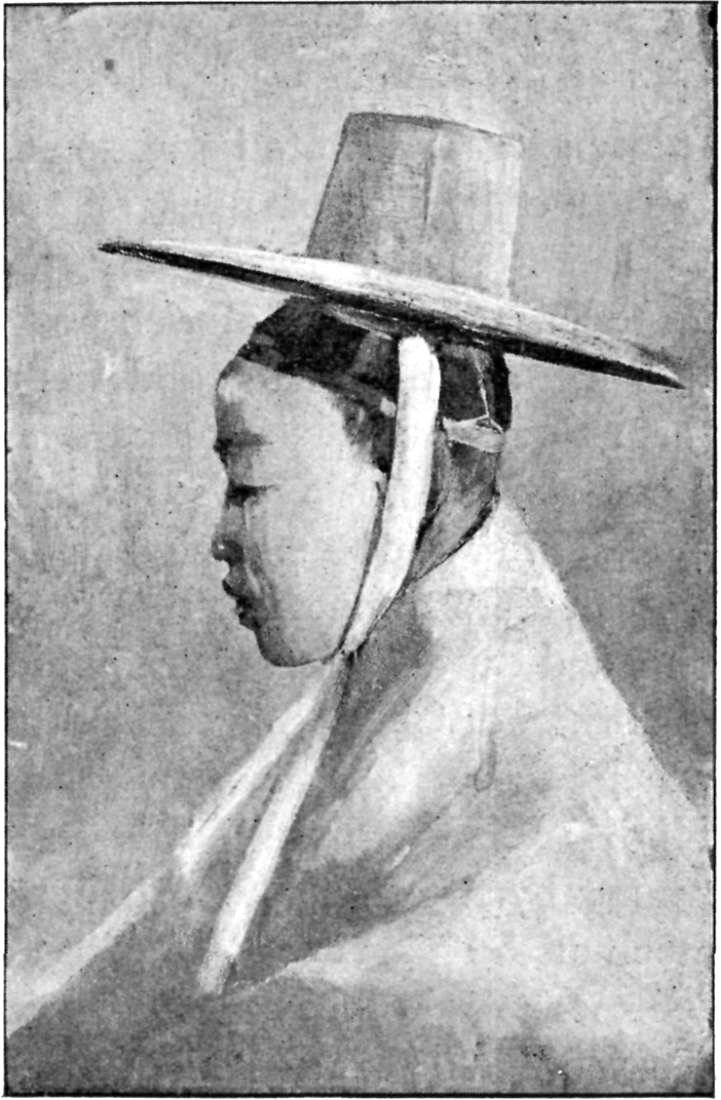
A Korean married man aged 12 (published 1895 from a sketch during his 1890 visit) by Arnold Henry Savage-Landor. The artist moved in elevated circles and portrayed two royal Princes.

Koreans also adapted another Chinese custom, the minmyeoneuri (민며느리), or child brides, when 6 and 7 years old girls were given off to marriage. They usually spent the years leading up to the actual wedding ceremony at their mothers-in-law's, where they worked as maids. This custom was not widespread and mainly observed by poor families, who could not afford to have a wedding otherwise. Because of such poor conditions, it could happen that the age difference between the bride and the groom was more than 30 years. However in the late nineteenth century, European travellers did report encountering male children being married, at which point their attire and hair was altered to match that of adult men. It was not until the period July- October 1894 that child marriage was banned. The age of marriage was raised for men to 20, and for women to 16.

The most important possession for a Korean family was the firstborn son, or jangja (장자). It had always been the case, but neo-Confucianism strengthened the idea even further. It was so important that no man could die without having a male heir. If they were unable to produce one, they had to adopt (from the same lineage). Most of the wealth and land of the family was inherited by the firstborn son, with the other sons getting small portions; girls were denied any such rights. Men were allowed to have more than one wife and several concubines.

== Women ==
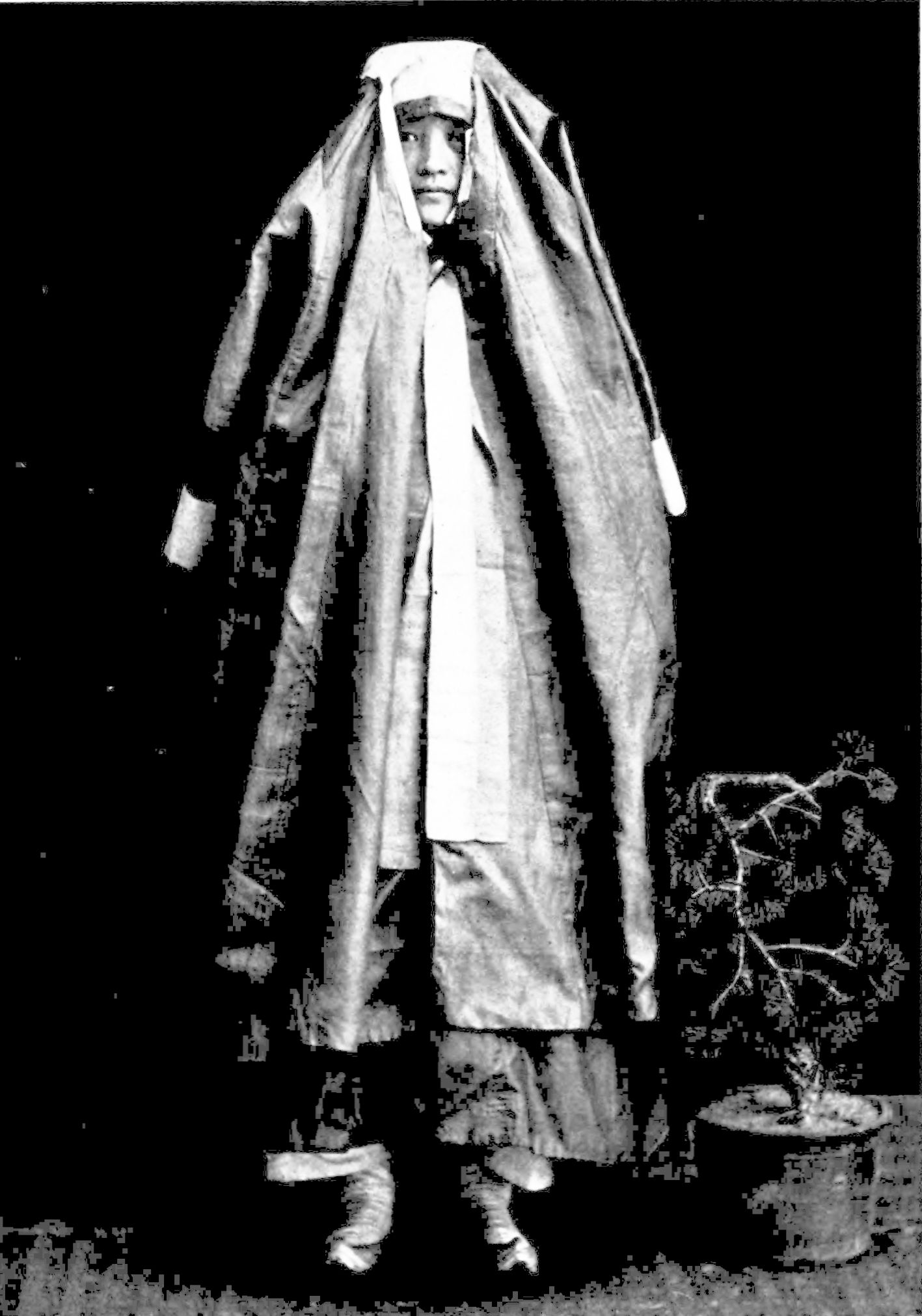
Photo 1906 described by the knowledgeable photographer, Homer Hulbert, as suitable respectable attire for the street. These were traditionally of green silk.

Women saw a decline in their rights and freedoms, particularly during the second half of the Joseon era after the Imjin War. Their life was regulated by Neo-Confucianism but in a much stricter way than in China, where the philosophy originated. The ensuing shift in social ideology from 1650 onwards has been described as striking.

Households headed by women disappeared at the beginning of the Joseon era, and they gradually lost their right to inheritance, as well. Women were expected to be faithful to their husbands beyond death, so widows were not allowed to remarry in the latter part of the dynasty. Men were allowed to have second wives besides their first wife as well as concubines, although they often enjoyed a lower status than the first wives. Yangban noblewomen were completely segregated from the rest of society. During the day they could not leave their homes, and if they had to, they were transported in a litter called gama (가마). These ideals and segregation could not completely be maintained into the lower classes, as commoner and slave women had various works to do. Nevertheless, even the peasant houses had separate rooms for men and women, and wealthier families had male and female quarters: "outer rooms" called sarangchae (사랑채) for men, and "inner rooms" called anche (안채) or anbang (안방; 內房) for women.

Most women were illiterate, as the public schools taught males exclusively. Even after the introduction of hangul, when literacy improved, women who could read and write made up only 4% as late as the 19th century. Women were not allowed to learn hanja, the Chinese characters used to write Korean. Women were also denied the right to participate in the jesa, the ancestor honoring rituals, which is also a significant divergence from the original Chinese practices.

Women could only have four types of "professions" in Joseon: they could become gungnyeo (palace women), shamans, physicians or gisaeng.

Sijo poetry began during the Joseon Dynasty, and the writing was originated by the yangban, also known as the educated elite who were trained in terms of Confucian values and literature. The way Sijo was used, it was a way for poets to express emotions regarding loyalty, longing, nature, philosophy, and love that correlated to social class and an individual's education. Over time, Sijo became more known and advanced since more and more people were more exposed to this type of writing. This shift was seen in poets like Hwang Jin-I. Hwang Jin-I was known as a gisaeng who wrote mainly about relaying a message that consisted of personal emotions. Her work expressed thoughts, feelings, and emotions alongside the ideas of the upper class. One of the main reasons why Sijo became more than just an elite poetry is because of Hwang Jin-I, and it showed different voices in society. It was able to give a good reflection on both classes during the Joseon era, as well as helping people express their emotions in that way.

== Daily life ==
Some revealing scenes from daily life show the workings of social rules behind them. Elegant and sophisticated luxury clothes and dwellings were the aspiration and expectation of the yangban class. Painted screens and calligraphy were displayed decoratively. Their homes were supported by servant-labour. The trades or professions that catered to the dress and habits of this class included hat-makers, jewellers, cloth-makers, dress-makers and the silk-clad Gisaeng. Marriage for upper-class women involved leaving the seclusion of the mother's quarters for the seclusion of the women's quarters of a new home. Child labour was integral to society, with working children dressed as miniature adults wearing the blue-white traditional clothing adults wore. Daily life is often reflected in the works of the sijo written during the Joseon Dynasty. The main themes of sijo included daily phenomena such as nature, loyalty, love, and components of Confucianism which was the main set of philosophical beliefs at the time. One of the main beliefs of Confucianism was that of protecting the social order. This meant following the social hierarchy and respecting those above you, as well as completing one's responsibilities based on their position in society.

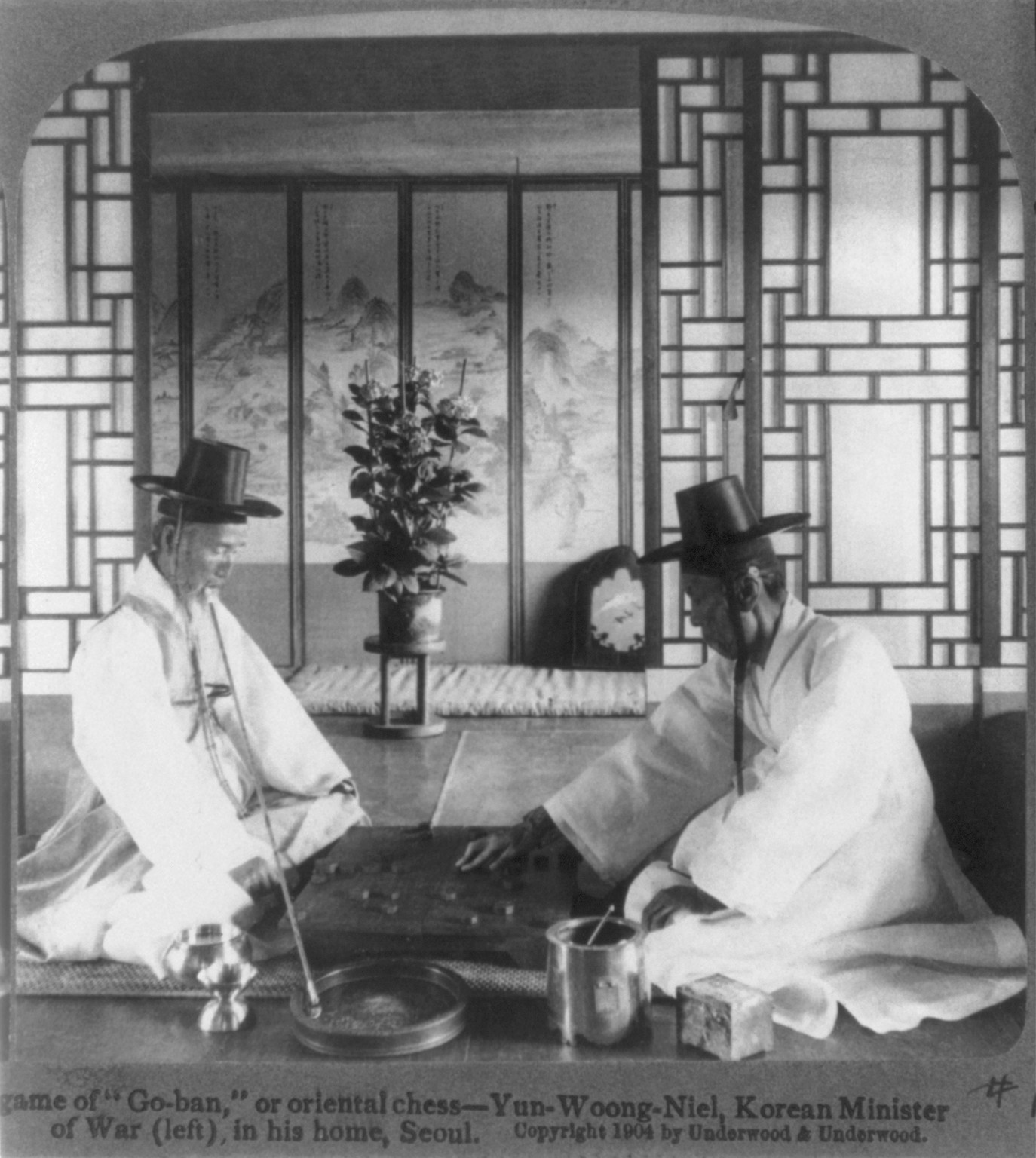
Posed portrait of Minister of War, Yun Ung-nyeol, in his expensively furnished home (1904). He plays Go-ban, similar to chess.

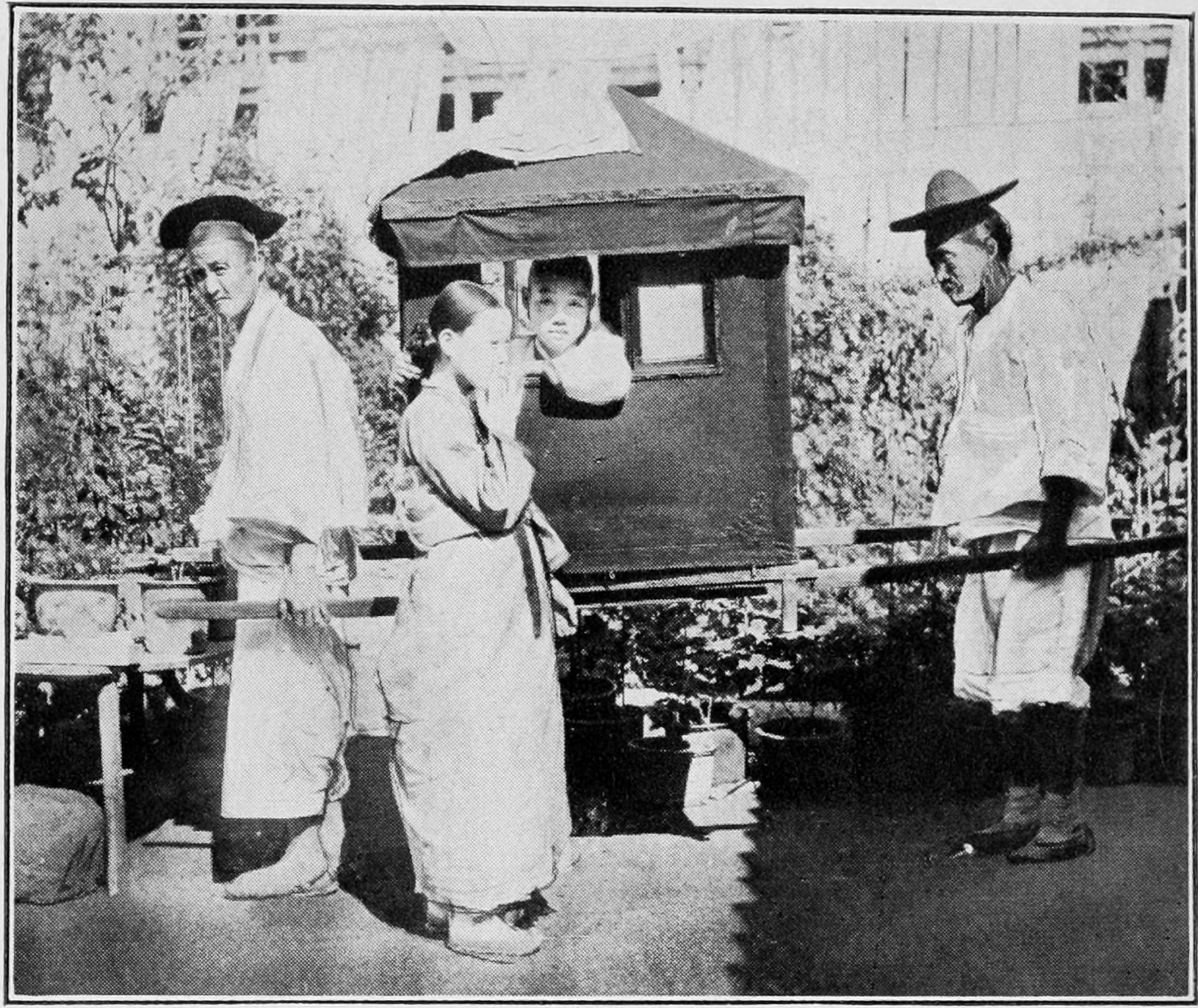
1912: A bride is about to be carried by servants to her new husband's home. She strokes the hair of the weeping woman in the foreground, perhaps her mother. Taken in a private walled garden (see the pot plants, table and the serrated shadow of the roof on the floor).

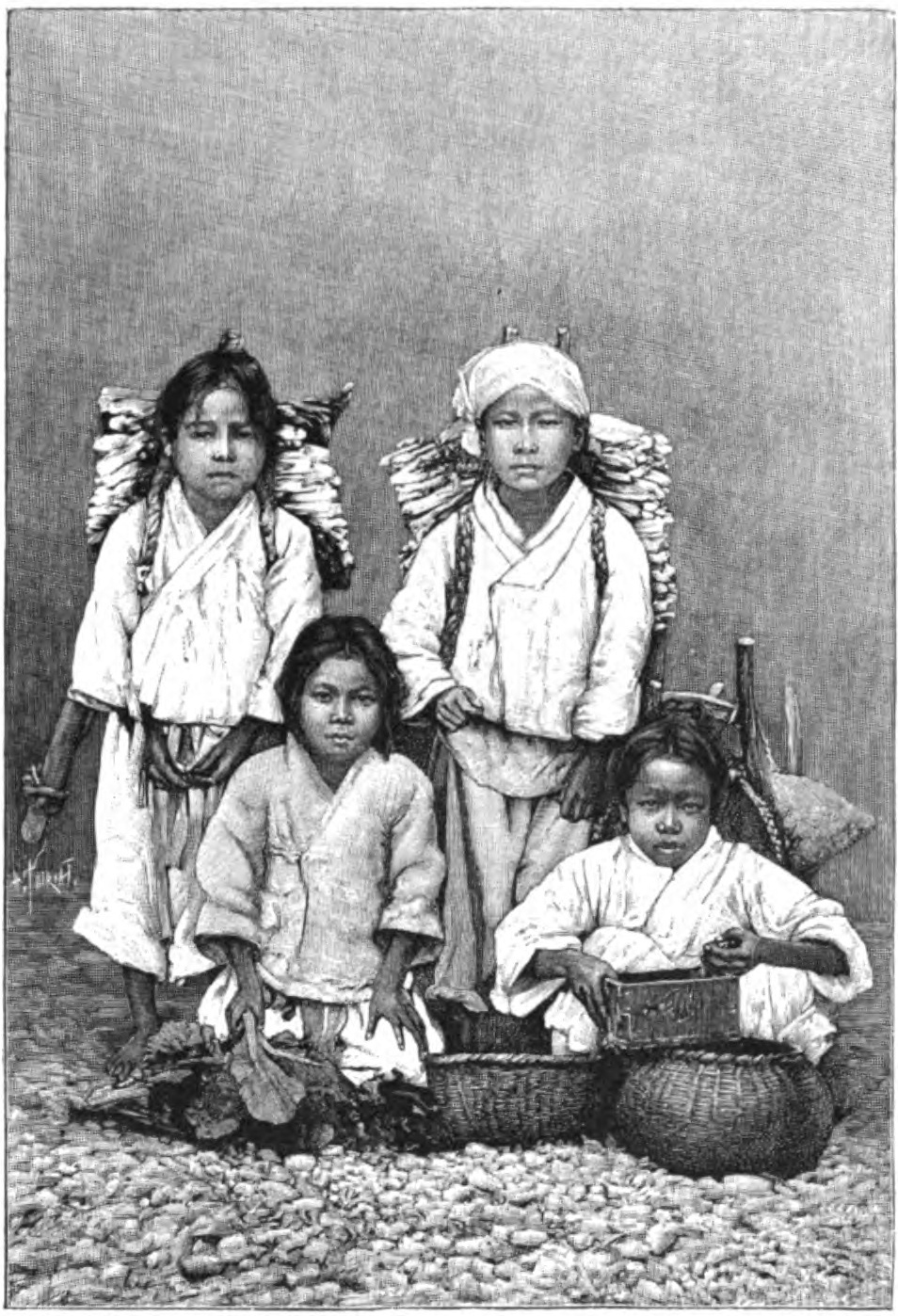
1892: posed photo of working children. The older ones have loaded pack frames. Boys and girls are together.

== Personal narratives ==
From the early 1880s, King Gojong and his queen began a process of Westernisation, thereby opening late Joseon society to Western residents and travellers. Amongst these observers are (alphabetically by surname):

Isabella Bird, doctor-missionary and travel writer. Her four visits to Korea took place between January 1894 and March 1897. In the Preface of her travelogue she expresses her concern that what she writes of should be correct and checked as far as she can with official returns and documents. Her interests include the people of contemporary Korea and their customs and expectations.

Charles Carat, an account of Korean travels in 1892 including many detailed sketches taken from photographs. These are chosen to illustrate the daily lives, trades and the housing of the people encountered. (Written in French).

Louise Jordan Miln whose work Quaint Korea, written in 1895, considers the practical position of women and the application of their rights in some detail.

Arnold Henry Savage Landor was a popular Victorian travel writer and artist. He also made observations of travel in Korea as he experienced it. His observations of the lives of women are written from the perspective of a middle-class European man of his time.

Perceval Lowell was an American businessman and distinguished astronomer who travelled extensively in the Far East including Korea. He assisted the 1883 royal Korean mission to the United States and authored books on Korean customs.

Lilias Underwood (1851–1921), wife of American missionary to Korea Horace Grant Underwood, wrote her impressions of life and customs as she observed them in her fifteen year stay, publishing her account in 1904.

== Bibliography ==
- Csoma, Mózes (2013). Egy nemzet, két ország – A közös gyökerektől. Korea (in Hungarian). Napvilág Kiadó. ISBN 978-963-338-360-5.
- Cumings, Bruce (1997). Korea's Place in the Sun: A Modern History. New York: W.W. Norton & Company. ISBN 0-393-31681-5.
- Kim Haboush, JaHyun (2013). The Memoirs of Lady Hyegyŏng: The Autobiographical Writings of a Crown Princess of Eighteenth-Century Korea (2 ed.). Berkeley: University of California Press. ISBN 978-0-520-20055-5.
- Nahm, Andrew C (1996). Korea: Tradition and Transformation — A History of the Korean People (second ed.). Elizabeth, NJ: Hollym International. ISBN 1-56591-070-2.
- Seth, Michael J. (2010). A History of Korea: From Antiquity to the Present. Rowman & Littlefield Publishers. ISBN 9780742567177.

== See also ==
- Neo-Confucianism
- Politics of the Joseon dynasty
- Political factions during the Joseon dynasty
- Gungnyeo
- Kisaeng
- History of Korea
