= I Want You (She's So Heavy) (The Simpsons) =

- The Simpsons episode
- Episode no.: Season 30; Episode 16
- Directed by: Steven Dean Moore
- Written by: Jeff Westbrook
- Production code: YABF08
- Original air date: March 10, 2019

Guest appearance
- Wallace Shawn as Wallace the Hernia

Episode features
- Chalkboard gag: The billboard says "Learn to amaze your friends at Springfield Hypnosis". Before the scene switches inside Springfield Elementary School, the Channel 6 helicopter crashes into it. In the school scene, instead of writing lines as punishment, Bart draws a tournament bracket of secondary characters, with Krusty as the winner.
- Couch gag: Homer and Marge are participating at the Pyramid game show. The phrase is "Things a couch would say". Marge starts with "You sit on me, there's a remote in my crack.", Homer answers "Uh, problems I have". Marge suggests "I could use a slip cover", to which Homer answers "Uh, things your sister would say". Finally, Marge says "Uh, you haven't replaced me since 1989." and Homer suggests correctly "Things a couch would say", and Marge says "Yes" with the crowd cheering.

Episode chronology
← Previous "101 Mitigations"	Next → "E My Sports"
- The Simpsons season 30

"I Want You (She's So Heavy)" is the sixteenth episode of the thirtieth season of the American animated television series The Simpsons, and the 655th episode overall. The episode was directed by Steven Dean Moore and written by Jeff Westbrook. It aired in the United States on Fox on March 10, 2019.

In this episode, Homer and Marge are injured while trying to be romantic, and Marge bonds with her physical therapist while Homer gets hallucinations from his pain medication. Wallace Shawn guest starred as Wallace the Hernia. The episode received mixed reviews.

This episode was dedicated to Luke Perry who died on March 4, 2019, and previously guest-starred as himself in the fourth season episode "Krusty Gets Kancelled."

The title of this episode is taken from the Beatles' song "I Want You (She's So Heavy)."

== Plot ==
Marge and Homer are compelled to go to Drug and Alcohol Night of Knowledge (D.A.N.K.) and hire Shauna Chalmers to babysit, but her boyfriend Jimbo Jones sneaks into the house. Lisa and Maggie are traumatized by the horror movies Jimbo is playing, while Bart is mesmerized by Jimbo and Shauna making out. The kids go for a walk, and the babysitters throw a house party. Ned Flanders sees the kids and invites them over for a mug of hot coconut milk.

Bored with the D.A.N.K. seminar, Homer and Marge sneak out, but in the hallway are enticed to sneak into the Springfield Wedding Expo using stolen name tags. Posing as Dr. and Mrs. Heffernen, the two improvise the expo's keynote speech, "Next Year's Wedding Trends", and find themselves in bliss because of their time together at the expo. The mood is almost soured when the two return home to find the house party still in process. After clearing out the intruders, Homer, still feeling romantic, attempts to carry Marge upstairs, but ends up falling down the stairs in pain, spraining Marge's ankle. At the hospital, Homer finds out he has developed an inguinal hernia. Back at home, side effects of the medication makes him hallucinate that his hernia, now named Wallace (Wallace Shawn), is talking to him in the form of a small man. The next day, at Springfield Physical Therapy, Marge gets trained by a New Zealand therapist named Nigel who talks her into learning kite-surfing. Wallace the hernia convinces Homer to blow off exercising, as well as a trip to the beach with Marge, causing a rift.

The next day, Marge is visibly disappointed when Homer uses his injury to get out of babysitting. Meanwhile, in the park, Lisa, with no other couple to turn to, asks Jimbo and Shauna for advice, who tell her the parents should find common interests. Back at home, Lisa persuades Homer to drive the kids to the beach for her "school project", while Maggie, who can see and hear Wallace, slaps the animated hernia. At the beach Homer recoils at how overweight Chief Wiggum is, and decides to join Marge kite-surfing, where they reconcile, but the wind blows their kites into a wind farm where they get new injuries.

At the Springfield Police Station, Marge finds out from Wiggum that Nigel is really a Russian spy named Dimitri, who was attempting to spy on Homer and Springfield's nuclear power plant. Wiggum and the Federal agents arrest Dimitri.

In the epilogue, a trailer for a spy movie, Mission: Simpossible, that also stars Wallace the Hernia as a pastiche of "Theme from Mission: Impossible" plays.

== Production ==
Wallace Shawn guest starred as Wallace, an anthropomorphized hallucination of Homer's hernia.

== Reception ==
Dennis Perkins of The A.V. Club gave the episode a D, stating, "This episode is nothing. It barely exists. It’s a disconnected heap of shells of older plots and ideas and character beats without an original thought or gag to enliven a single one."

Tony Sokol of Den of Geek gave the episode 4 out of 5 stars. He thought the episode felt like the earlier seasons, calling it a "mixture of disrespect, family unity and a warped community’s values." He highlights the scene of Chalmers forcing Skinner to take drugs and the scene of Homer asking his physical therapist to drop his accent.

"I Want You (She's so Heavy)" scored a 0.8 rating with a 4 share and was watched by 2.21 million people, making The Simpsons Fox's second highest rated show of the night, behind Family Guy.
