= David Masson (disambiguation) =

David Masson (1822–1907) was a Scottish literary critic and historian.

David Masson may also refer to:

- David I. Masson (1917–2007), Scottish science-fiction author
- David Orme Masson (1858–1937), English and Australian chemist
- David Parkes Masson (1847–1915), British philatelist

== See also ==
- David Mason (disambiguation)
- Masson (disambiguation)
