= Phreak (commentator) =

American esports commentator

David Turley
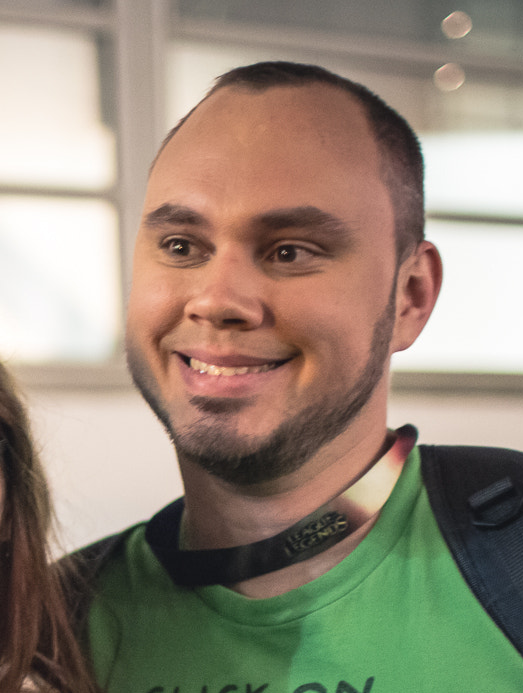
- Turley in 2015
- Other name: Phreak
- Sports commentary career
- Sport: Esports
- Employer: Riot Games

David Turley, better known as Phreak, is an American former League of Legends esports commentator for Riot Games. He has one of the longest careers of an esports commentator in the North American League of Legends Championship Series and has cast in several of the largest major international tournaments.

== Early life ==
Turley graduated from the University of California, San Diego (UCSD) with a degree in economics.

== Career ==
Turley's casting activities started in the Warcraft 3 scene, winning Blizzard Battle Report Contests in 2006. He was a professional Warcraft 3 player.

Turley is a League of Legends caster and community member who works for Riot Games. Turley was also a Platinum rated summoner in season one, and Diamond rated in seasons two and three, which lends credibility to his videos and commentating work. Turley is responsible for videos released by Riot Games, such as the Champion Spotlights and Patch Previews. As of March 30, 2020 Turley was a Gold rated summoner after achieving Platinum or Diamond the previous five seasons. Ahead of the 2024 League of Legends Pre-Season, Turley was promoted to Live Balance Design Lead. In November 2023, Turley announced that he was “more or less going to quit social media for the immediate future” in response to receiving death threats.

He provided the voice of an Esports announcer in the Simpsons episode "E My Sports".
