= Korea: Tradition and Transformation =

1988 history book

Korea: Tradition and Transformation—A History of the Korean People
- Title page for Korea: Tradition and Transformation—A History of the Korean People (1988)
- Author: Andrew C. Nahm
- Published: 1988
- Publisher: Hollym
- ISBN: 978-0-930878-56-6
- OCLC: 19128642

Korea: Tradition and Transformation—A History of the Korean People is a history book written by Andrew C. Nahm. It was published in 1988 by Hollym.

== General references ==
- Delissen, Alain (February 1991). "Andrew C. Nahm, Korea, Tradition and Transformation, Séoul, Hollym, 1988, 583 p., index, bibliogr. et cartes". Annales. Histoire, Sciences Sociales. 46 (1): 120–122. doi:10.1017/S0395264900073352. ISSN 0395-2649.
- Duncan, John B. (November 1989). "Korea: Tradition and Transformation—A History of the Korean People. By Andrew C. Nahm. Seoul: Hollym, 1988. 583 pp". The Journal of Asian Studies. 48 (4): 892–893. doi:10.2307/2058191. ISSN 0021-9118.
