= Baekdu-daegan =

Traditional Korean conception of its mountains

Baekdu-daegan 백두대간 白頭大幹
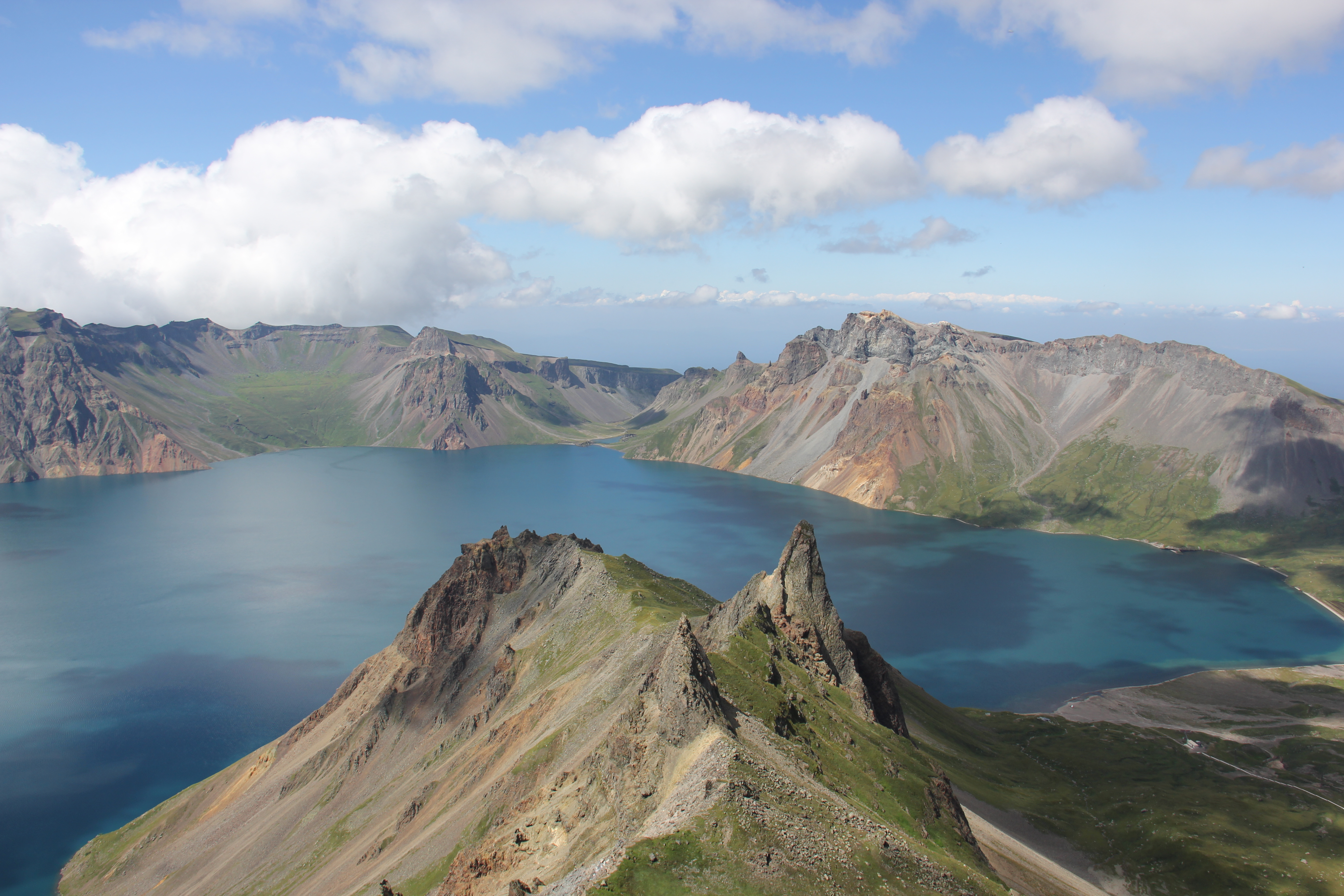
- The summit caldera of Paektu Mountain, the tallest mountain of Baekdu-daegan (2012)

Highest point
- Peak: Paektu Mountain
- Elevation: 2,744 m (9,003 ft)
- Coordinates: 41°59′36″N 128°04′39″E

Dimensions
- Length: 1,500 km (930 mi)

Geography
- Countries: South Korea; North Korea; China
- Range coordinates: 38°40′N 127°54′E

Korean name
- Hangul: 백두대간
- Hanja: 白頭大幹
- RR: Baekdu daegan
- MR: Paektu taegan

Baekdu-daegan (Korean: 백두대간; Hanja: 白頭大幹) is a traditional Korean conception of the mountains and consequently the watersheds of the Korean Peninsula. The mountain range stretches the length of the Korean Peninsula, around 1,500 km, from Baekdu Mountain in the north to Jirisan, or Hallasan on Jeju Island in the south. The mountain range is often associated with national identity and traditional Korean shamanism.

Baekdu-daegan is considered to include the Sobaek and Taebaek mountain ranges. Although currently impossible due to the Korean Demilitarized Zone between North Korea and South Korea, hiking the length of the mountains is considered a desirable goal aligned with the Korean reunification movement. The 687 km South Korean portion of the range is popular for hiking.

It is often referred to as the "spine" or "backbone" of the Korean Peninsula.

== Description ==
Baekdu-daegan describes a 1,500 km long mountain range that runs from Paektu Mountain in the north to Cheonwangbong Peak of Jirisan in the south. It may even include Hallasan on Jeju Island. The concept also consequently describes the watershed of the peninsula, and notes 13 jeongmaek, mountain ranges that branch off the main range, that effectively channel Korea's most significant rivers to the ocean. A crestline which no body of water ever crosses.

In South Korea, hiking the 687 km South Korean portion of the trail, generally from south to north until the Korean Demilitarized Zone, is seen as a significant achievement. The South Korean trail was designated as a national nature-preservation park in 2006 by the South Korean government. The desire to also hike through the border until Paektu Mountain is also relevant to Korean reunification sentiment. This sentiment is also shared in North Korea, according to Roger Shepherd of HIKEKOREA.

It is important in traditional Korean geography and is a key aspect of Pungsu-jiri (the Korean analogue of feng shui).

== History ==
Under traditional Korean thought, influenced by Taoism and Neo-Confucianism, Paektu is regarded as the origin and patriarch of all Korean mountains, while Jiri-san or Hallasan at the southern end is conceived-of as the grand matriarch of all Korean mountains.

During the Japanese occupation of Korea from 1910 to 1945, Japan attempted to restructure Korean mountains in accordance with the concept of mountain ranges as used in Western geography. The notion of the mountain ranges that prevailed during the Japanese occupation era was one based on geological structures under the ground, rather than topographical ones.

=== Recent history ===
Hiking the Baekdu-daegan trail was not popular until the late 20th century, as there was no formal trail and dangers such as Siberian tigers were present. Korean hikers began creating trails and maps starting in the 1980s. In the 1990s, county governments that the trail passed through began making/improving trails. By the 2000s, there were formal monuments, signs, trail-markers, stairways, water fountains, and trailheads. In 2003, the Korea Forest Service was granted authority over the region as a whole within South Korea, but the scope of that authority and the geographical boundaries of the Baekdu-daegan region have remained undefined and controversial.

Before 2005, the Baekdu-daegan remained entirely unknown to the world outside Korea, but tourism professor David A. Mason began to promote it to the global audience in English by establishing a website and publishing articles. Andrew Douch and Roger Shepherd, hikers from New Zealand, trekked all of the available crestline trail while keeping careful records, and then with research & editing support from Prof. Mason, wrote a guidebook to the trail. Their book is the most extensive information about the Baekdu-daegan in English as of 2021. Their effort attracted international hikers. On January 3, 2011, Mason was appointed the Honorary Public Relations Ambassador of the Baekdu-daegan by Minister Chung of the Korea Forest Service, under authority of Korean President Lee Myung-bak. Shepherd continued his explorations and international promotions of the Baekdu-daegan, including expeditions into some parts of it in North Korea.

At the 2018 Winter Olympics held in Pyeongchang, South Korean President Moon Jae-in said in a speech that the two Koreas were bound together by the Baekdu-daegan. At the April 2018 Inter-Korean Summit, Chairman Kim Jong Un and President Moon symbolically planted a native tree using soil from both Paektu Mountain and Hallasan.

== See also ==
- Geography of North Korea
- Geography of South Korea
- Korean creation narratives
- List of mountains in Korea
