= Dave Mason (footballer) =

English footballer

David Mason
Personal information
- Full name: David William Mason
- Date of birth: 3 February 1913
- Place of birth: South Shields, England
- Date of death: 1983 (aged 69–70)
- Place of death: Gateshead, England
- Height: 5 ft 11 in (1.80 m)
- Positions: Inside forward; centre forward

Senior career*
Years	Team	Apps	(Gls)
–	Cornsay Colliery Welfare		
193?–1936	Bohemians (Newcastle)		
1936	Blyth Spartans		
1936–1937	Newcastle United	0	(0)
1937–1938	Blyth Spartans		
1938–19??	Darlington	6	(5)
- * Club domestic league appearances and goals

David William Mason (03 February 1913 – 1983) was an English amateur footballer who played as an inside right or centre forward in the Football League for Darlington. He was on the books of Newcastle United without playing first-team football for them, and played non-league football for Cornsay Colliery Welfare, for Northern Amateur League club Bohemians, and for Blyth Spartans.

== Life and career ==
Mason was born in South Shields, County Durham, in 1913. He played football for Cornsay Colliery Welfare, and made his name as a goalscorer playing for the Newcastle-based club Bohemians of the Northern Amateur League. Described as an inside right of powerful build, he signed for Blyth Spartans in July 1936. When selected to represent the Northumberland Association against the West Riding of Yorkshire in a Northern Counties Amateur Championship match that November, the local newspaper, the Morpeth Herald, mentioned that he had been "causing some flutterings lately among scouts of the Football League clubs." He was not a regular first-teamer for Spartans, but was brought in to replace a cup-tied player in the FA Cup fourth qualifying round match against Walker Celtic.

His performances attracted interest from Aston Villa, Everton and Newcastle United, and he joined the latter club on amateur forms in late December 1936. He made no appearances for Newcastle's league team, and rejoined Spartans for 1937–38. He continued to score, and his creative play was also noticed. In February 1938, he played for a Football Association Amateur XI against the Universities Athletic Union, and in March, he captained and starred in the Northumberland F.A. team that beat the Sheffield Hallam Association in the semi-final of the Northern Counties Amateur Championship.

Mason moved into the Football League with Darlington in 1938: he had received various offers from "bigger" clubs, but wanted to retain his amateur status and his regular job as a schoolteacher in Newcastle. He suffered a rupture that needed surgery and kept him out for the first half of the season. The Evening Chronicle's amateur football correspondent thought that Mason would have been included in the North eleven for the amateur international trials in October had he been fit. He first appeared for Darlington's reserves in the North-Eastern League in January 1939, and was selected to captain Northumberland amateurs against Cumberland later that month.

After a poor run of form in which Darlington took only one point from five matches, Mason made his first outing in the Football League, taking over the inside-right position as one of three changes for the visit of Hull City on 18 February 1939. The Hull Daily Mail dubbed it a "particularly meritorious" debut, albeit in a 1–0 loss, but thought the Darlington forward line "sadly lacking in guile". He played in the next match, but was not picked again until the last four fixtures of the season in which, playing at centre forward, he scored five goals: one in a 3–1 loss at Wrexham, a hat-trick against Barrow, and one in a 2–1 defeat at home to York City in the last match of the season.

Mason broke his wrist playing for Darlington's reserve team at the start of the 1939–40 season, before the Second World War put an end to proceedings. He took no part in Darlington's wartime league programme, but was involved with a Northern Amateur League team that played matches against military teams in aid of charitable causes.

Mason died in Gateshead in 1983 at the age of 70.
