= David A. Mason =

American Koreanist (born 1957)

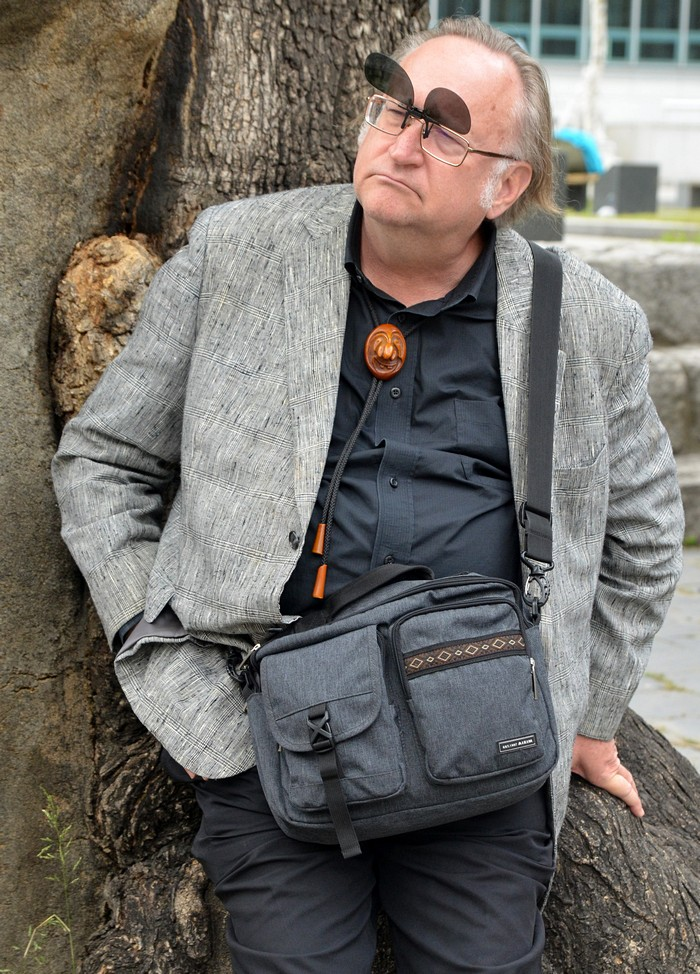
- David A. Mason rests against a tree during a RAS Korea event on May 16, 2017.
- Born: November 11, 1957 (age 68); Detroit, Michigan
- Occupation: university professor
- Website: san-shin.org

David Alan Mason (born November 11, 1957) is an American academic usually based in South Korea. Now retired, he was a professor of cultural tourism at Sejong University in Seoul from 2014 to 2023. He has authored about 10 prominent books on Korean culture, spirituality, travel and mountains, and serves as a scholar, author, public speaker and tour guide. He remains a well-known authority on Korean spiritual traditions of all kinds, especially about his core topic the Sansin (산신, 山神, Sanshin) deity and their shrines found throughout Korea called Sansin-gak (산신각, 山神閣), integral parts of Korean Buddhist temples, Korean Shamanism and village life. He is also an expert on the Baekdu-daegan mountain range and Korea's national parks, having visited all 20 as of 2011.

== Personal life and education ==
Mason was born in Detroit, and raised in its suburb Birmingham, Michigan. He earned his B.A. degree from the University of Michigan and San Francisco State University in 1981, studying Oriental Philosophy, Environmental Biology, Health and Macrobiotics. He first visited Korea in July 1982, staying for a year as an English teacher and growing increasingly interested in the traditional culture found in its mountains, ultimately turning it into a career. He moved to Korea permanently in January 1986. He received his M.A. in Korean Studies from Yonsei University of Seoul in 1997, majoring in the history of Korean traditional religions.

== Career and appearances ==
Mason worked for Kangwon National University 1988–97, Yonsei University Wonju Campus 1999–2000, Korea's Ministry of Culture, Sports and Tourism 2001–05, and the Tourism College of Kyung Hee University 2005–13.

He has been featured many times in Korean media, including print, television and radio programs, such as the Arirang TV interview-show "Heart to Heart" hour-long episode on May 21, 2013 entitled "David A. Mason, an established Korean mountain spirit expert". He also appeared in the half-hour episode 8 of Arirang TV's "K-Phile" (Korea-Lover) series entitled "Sanshin, a Symbol of Korea's Nature and Culture" on Dec 14 2016, and in a section of the Chosun Mountain-TV program entitled "산의 부활 Rejuvenescence of Mountain", about the "K-Mountain" promotional effort launched that autumn by the Ministry of Culture, Sports and Tourism and Mason's research activities, in January 2017.

He has contributed to The Korea Times several times over the years, starting in 1983 with an article on Jikjisa. To promote cultural tourism in Korea, he created a database of his top 40 sites in Korea for the World Pilgrimage Guide. He assisted Tony MacGregor and cohorts in designing and trekking the Wonhyo Trail pilgrimage-tourism project in 2011.

He assisted in the creation of Korea's Temple Stay program in 2002.

He has been an English editor and writer the Jogye Order of Korean Buddhism, and an adjunct professor of international tourism for the Hanyang University Graduate School of Tourism, and taught courses on the history of Korean culture and Northeast Asian Relations for Hanyang's International Summer School Intensive Program.

He has served on the managing boards of and been a frequent lecturer for Royal Asiatic Society Korea Branch (RAS) in Seoul and contributed to the society's journal Transactions, writing on "Sacred Aspects and Assets of Taebaek-san", "Jirisan: Sacred Aspects and Assets", "Mountain Tourism and Religious Heritage Sites: A Fresh Paradigm" and "Go-un Choi Chi-won’s Pungryu".

Mason was an invited speaker on Korea's Religious Tourism features at the UNWTO's "International Conference on Tourism, Religions and Dialogue of Cultures" in Córdoba, Spain in October 2007 and "International Congress on Religious Tourism and Pilgrimage" in Fatima, Portugal in November 2017. In addition, his research paper "The Baekdu-daegan Region as Korea's Fresh & Green Multi-faith Pilgrimage-Tourism Destination" was published by the "Religious Tourism in Asia and the Pacific" Report of UNWTO in April 2011.

== Pioneering globalization of the Baekdu-daegan mountains ==
Before 2005 the Baekdu-daegan mountain system, a connected web of all Korea's mountains that defines the geography of the Korean Peninsula, remained entirely unknown to the world outside Korea, but in that year professor Mason began to promote it to the global audience in English by establishing the website san-shin.org and publishing articles highlighting the spiritual and cultural traditions of the mountain range.

He served as the contributing editor to the first Edition of the "Baekdu-daegan Trail Guidebook" authored by Roger Shepherd and Andrew Douch, which garnered wide attention from international travel-hikers.

He was appointed as the Republic of Korea's Honorary Ambassador of the Baekdu-daegan mountain-system in January 2011.

He gave a talk at a seminar and publicity event about Baekdu-daegan held by the Korea Forest Research Institute at the Mungyeong Saejae Pass on June 10, 2010, which also featured Director-General Shin Jun-hwan and the famous Korean poet Ko Un

== Publications ==
- [1987] 'Modern Hotel English' (Hollym)
- [1987] 'POSCO Business English' (Pohang Steel Company)
- [1993] 'Korea: A Sensory Journey' (Woojin Publishers) with photography by Marc Vérin
- [1997] 'Korea: A Travel Survival Kit' (Lonely Planet)
- [1999] 'Spirit Of The Mountains: Korea's San-shin and Traditions of Mountain-Worship' (Hollym) (Korean edition 2002)
- [2005] 'Passage to Korea' (Hollym) with photography by Marc Vérin
- [2010] 'The Colors of Korean Buddhism: 30 Icons and their Stories' overall editor and co-author (Korean Buddhism Promotion Foundation) published for the 2010 G20 Seoul summit in November 2010
- [2010] 'Baekdu Daegan Trail: Hiking Korea's Mountain Spine' contributing editor (Seoul Selection)
- [2010] 'The Korean Forest Culture of the Baekdu-daegan: Spiritual and Folk Heritages along Korea’s Grand Tiger's Spine Mountain-System' (Forest Recreation and Culture Division of the Korea Forest Service for the U.N. Convention to Combat Desertification 2011) with photography by Roger Shepherd
- [2013] 'An Encyclopedia of Korean Buddhism' (Unjusa) cowritten with Ven. Hyewon
- [2016] 'Solitary Sage: the Profound Life, Wisdom and Legacy of "Go-un" Choi Chi-won'
- [2017] 'Sports, Leisure and Games in Korea: A Sourcebook' contributing editor of English version (Academy of Korean Studies Press)
- [2026] 'Korean Dragons 大韓龍 대한용 DaeHanYong – Korea’s Dragon Traditions and their Yong-wang Monarchs' author (self-published) in three volumes
