= Hollym (publishing house) =

South Korean-American publisher

- Founded: 1963; 62 years ago
- Country of origin: South Korea; United States
- Headquarters location: Seoul; California
- Distribution: International
- Key people: Ham Ki-man (CEO)
- Publication types: Books
- Nonfiction topics: Korean art, cooking, language, religion, philosophy, social sciences, sports, travel
- Fiction genres: fiction, short stories
- Official website: www.hollym.co.kr www.hollym.com

- Hollym
- Hangul: 한림출판사
- Hanja: 翰林出版社
- RR: Hallim chulpansa
- MR: Hallim ch'ulp'ansa

Hollym (Korean: 한림출판사) is a publishing house with offices in Seoul, South Korea and California, United States.

== History ==
Hollym was first founded by Lim In Soo (林仁秀) in the Jongno district in Seoul on January 18, 1963. The company was formerly based in New Jersey. The US company has been publishing books on Korea and Korea-related topics since 1977. The CEO is Ham Ki-man. The company is divided between Hollym's international branch, which handles US publishing and international distribution, and the Korea-based Hollym branch. The Korean corporation was founded in 1963.

Hollym publishes books on Korean art, cooking, fiction (including short stories), language, religion and philosophy, social sciences, sports, and travel.

== See also ==
- Korean studies
