= List of The Simpsons guest stars (seasons 21–present) =

Guest star list for animated series

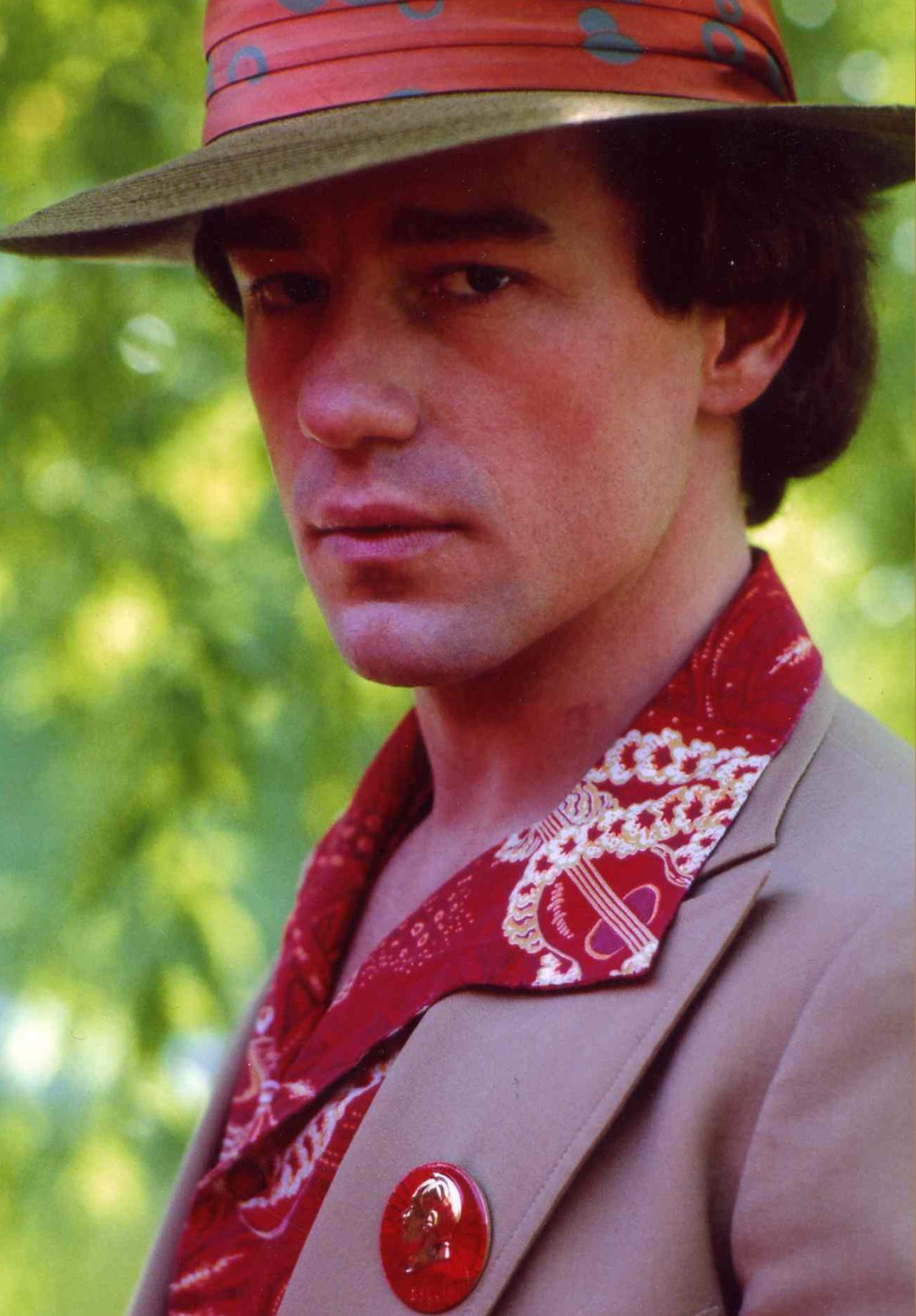
Actor Phil Hartman, who died in 1998, was the most recurring male guest actor on the show, appearing 52 times.

In addition to the show's regular cast of voice actors, celebrity guest stars have been a staple of The Simpsons, an American animated television sitcom created by Matt Groening for the Fox Broadcasting Company, since its first season. The Simpsons focuses on the eponymous family, which consists of Homer, Marge, Bart, Lisa and Maggie. The family was initially conceived by Groening for a series of animated shorts, which originally aired as a part of The Tracey Ullman Show between 1987 and 1989. The shorts were developed into a half-hour prime time series which began in December 1989. The series' 38th season premiered on September 27, 2026, and 816 episodes of The Simpsons have aired. A feature film adaptation of the series called The Simpsons Movie, was released in 2007.

Guest voices have come from a wide range of professions, including actors, athletes, authors, musicians, artists, politicians and scientists. In the show's early years most guest stars voiced original characters, but as the show has continued the number of those appearing as themselves has increased.

The first credited guest star was Marcia Wallace who appeared in "Bart the Genius" in her first stint as Bart's teacher Edna Krabappel. Singer Tony Bennett was the first guest star to appear as himself, appearing briefly in the season two episode "Dancin' Homer". Several guest stars have featured as recurring characters on the show, including Phil Hartman, Joe Mantegna and Kelsey Grammer. After Wallace, Hartman made the most appearances, guest starring 52 times. Mantegna has appeared over forty times, Maurice LaMarche has appeared over thirty times, Grammer, Jon Lovitz and Frank Welker have appeared twenty times or more; Albert Brooks, Glenn Close and Jackie Mason have appeared ten or more times, while Michael Dees, Dana Gould, Terry W. Greene, Valerie Harper, Jan Hooks, Jane Kaczmarek, Stacy Keach, Kipp Lennon, J. K. Simmons, Sally Stevens, George Takei and Michael York have made over five appearances.

Three guest stars, Ricky Gervais, Seth Rogen and Pete Holmes, earned writing credits for the episodes in which they appeared. Grammer, Mason and three-time guest star Anne Hathaway all won the Primetime Emmy Award for Outstanding Voice-Over Performance for guest voice roles on the show. The show was awarded the Guinness World Record for "Most Guest Stars Featured in a TV Series" in 2010. As of November 15, 2026, there have been 1094 guest stars on the show, (Note: This figure counts the members of bands with speaking roles separately. Bands who merely perform a song are counted as one because there is no confirmation of which of the band's members performed on their appearance.) with this figure rising to 1097 if The Simpsons Movie is included.

== History ==
Guest stars have appeared on The Simpsons since its first season, in addition to the show's main cast of Dan Castellaneta, Julie Kavner, Nancy Cartwright, Yeardley Smith, Hank Azaria and Harry Shearer and supporting cast of Tress MacNeille, Maggie Roswell, Chris Edgerly, Dawnn Lewis, Grey DeLisle, Alex Désert, Eric Lopez, Jenny Yokobori, Kimberly D. Brooks, Tony Rodríguez, Jonathan Lipow, Mo Collins and Kelly Macleod and former supporting cast members Jo Ann Harris, Pamela Hayden, Russi Taylor, Christopher Collins, Susan Blu, Lona Williams, Doris Grau, Marcia Mitzman Gaven, Karl Wiedergott and Melanie Minchino. Kevin Michael Richardson started as a recurring guest star in the twenty first season, but joined the supporting cast in the twenty eighth, starting with the episode "The Last Traction Hero".

Guest voices have come from a wide range of professions, including actors, athletes, authors, musicians, artists, politicians, scientists, historians, film producers, film directors, and animators. In the earlier seasons, most of the guest stars voiced characters, but eventually more started appearing as themselves. The first male guest star was actor Sam McMurray, who voiced a worker at the Springfield Nuclear Power Plant in "Homer's Odyssey", the show's third episode, and Marcia Wallace was the first female guest star on the show starting from "Bart the Genius" as Edna Krabappel and Ms. Melon. Singer Tony Bennett was the first guest star to appear as himself, appearing in the season two episode "Dancin' Homer" while Aerosmith were the first band with their cameo in the third season's "Flaming Moe's".

Several guest stars have made multiple appearances on the show, often as recurring characters. Actress Marcia Wallace guest starred 176 times, making her the most recurring female guest star on the show, until her death in 2013. Edna Krabappel was then retired from the show, but sometimes appears as a ghost, and actor Phil Hartman guest-starred in 52 episodes, more than any other male actor, although his initial role in the second season episode "Bart Gets Hit by a Car" in 1991 was intended to be a one-off. He voiced the recurring characters Troy McClure and Lionel Hutz as well as numerous other one-time characters, until his death in 1998. McClure and Hutz were subsequently retired from the show. Actor Kelsey Grammer first appeared as Sideshow Bob in the first-season episode "Krusty Gets Busted" while actor Joe Mantegna made his first appearance as Fat Tony in the third season episode "Bart the Murderer". The two have appeared in 21 and 28 episodes respectively; Mantegna also appeared in the film. Both roles were originally written for other actors: Bob was originally to be voiced by James Earl Jones, who later guest starred three times on the show, while Fat Tony was written for Sheldon Leonard. Other repeat guest stars include Albert Brooks, Glenn Close, Jan Hooks, Maurice LaMarche, Jon Lovitz, Jane Kaczmarek, Jackie Mason, Charles Napier and Frank Welker.

According to Groening, guest star choices "come from the writers saying, 'Wouldn't it be cool to have [such a person on the show]?'", while showrunner Al Jean has stated the reasoning is "we want to meet our heroes." Bill Oakley and Josh Weinstein, showrunners of the seventh and eight seasons, favored guest stars with what they felt were unique and interesting voices such as actors R. Lee Ermey, Donald Sutherland, Kirk Douglas and Lawrence Tierney. In 2014, Jean stated that fewer people would be appearing as themselves, as the staff did not want it to become a "crazy roster".

Many guest stars come into the show's recording studio to record their parts, although some are recorded over the telephone. Three guest stars have been credited with writing the episode in which they guest starred. Comedian Ricky Gervais wrote the episode "Homer Simpson, This Is Your Wife", while actor Seth Rogen co-wrote the episode "Homer the Whopper" with Evan Goldberg, and comedian Pete Holmes wrote the two-part "Warrin' Priests" episodes. Two guest stars were credited with pseudonyms. Actor Dustin Hoffman was credited as "Sam Etic" for the episode "Lisa's Substitute" while musician Michael Jackson was credited as "John Jay Smith" for the episode "Stark Raving Dad". After the latter episode, the producers decided that if a celebrity wished to guest star on the show, they had to be willing to be credited under their real name.

Numerous people have rejected the chance to appear on the show. Actor William Shatner has been described as the first person to reject the show. The producers have consistently failed to persuade any former President of the United States to appear. Musicians Bruce Springsteen and Bob Dylan have also rejected multiple invitations to guest star on the series. Other people to turn the show down include actors Michael Caine, Tom Cruise, Clint Eastwood and Anthony Hopkins and director Quentin Tarantino. Musician Prince turned down a role in a sequel to "Stark Raving Dad", which meant the script was never produced.

Others have accepted the offer, but have been unable to record a role. Musician Frank Zappa and actor Anthony Perkins both became too ill to record their parts, while Jim Carrey had to drop out due to time constraints, and Faye Dunaway cancelled. Christopher Walken originally agreed to appear as himself in "Insane Clown Poppy". However, he then decided to demand a lot more money than the producers were willing to pay. Instead, Jay Mohr provided the voice of Walken. The end credits state "Jay Mohr as Christopher Walken". This is the first time this has ever been done.

Robby Krieger of The Doors recorded a cameo for the episode "The Great Money Caper", but his part was cut because the writers felt his appearance seemed too forced. The scene was later included on the season's DVD release. Similarly, actress Catherine O'Hara recorded the voice of Colette the waitress in "Flaming Moe's", but was redubbed with Jo Ann Harris who the producers felt was a better fit. Ron Howard, in what would have been his third appearance on The Simpsons, was advertised as guest starring on "Children of a Lesser Clod". However, he did not appear for any recording sessions. Similarly, Werner Herzog was advertised as guest starring in "Thanksgiving of Horror", in what would have been his third appearance as Walter Hotenhoffer, but did not appear in the final episode.

Mason, Grammer and Anne Hathaway have each won the Primetime Emmy Award for Outstanding Voice-Over Performance for their guest voice roles on the show. The show was awarded the Guinness World Record for "Most Guest Stars Featured in a TV Series" on May 23, 2010, with Guinness estimating that the show has featured "at least 555 as of series 21". As of November 15, 2026, there have been 1094 guest stars on the show, totalling 1813 guest spots.^{[A]} These figures rise to 1097 and 1821 respectively if The Simpsons Movie is counted as well.

== Guest stars ==
Seasons: 1 2 3 4 5 6 7 8 9 10 11 12 13 14 15 16 17 18 • Movie • 19 20 21 22 23 24 25 26 27 28 29 30 31 32 33 34 35 • Upcoming •

- The color of the season number in the first column corresponds to the color of that season's DVD boxset or digital purchase image for the seasons which have not been released in physical format.
- In the No. column:
  - The first number refers to the order it aired during the entire series.
  - The second number refers to the episode number within its season: i.e. 1506 would be the sixth episode of the fifteenth season.
- The production code refers to the code assigned to the episode by the production team. The first two characters refer to the season the episode was made for. The first season is 7Gxx, the second is 7Fxx, the third is 8Fxx and the fourth is 9Fxx. After that, the fifth season started with 1F and continued in order until season nine (which was 5F). Starting with season ten, the production codes started with AABF, with the first letter changing for each season (i.e. BABF, CABF, etc.). The number at the end of the code is the order in which that episode was produced during that production run.
- Guests with "(archival)" after their names refer to cases where roles were not recorded specifically for the episode, but instead archival audio and/or footage from independent sources was used in the episode. In most cases these appearances have been uncredited and are usually not considered as proper guest stars given the circumstances.

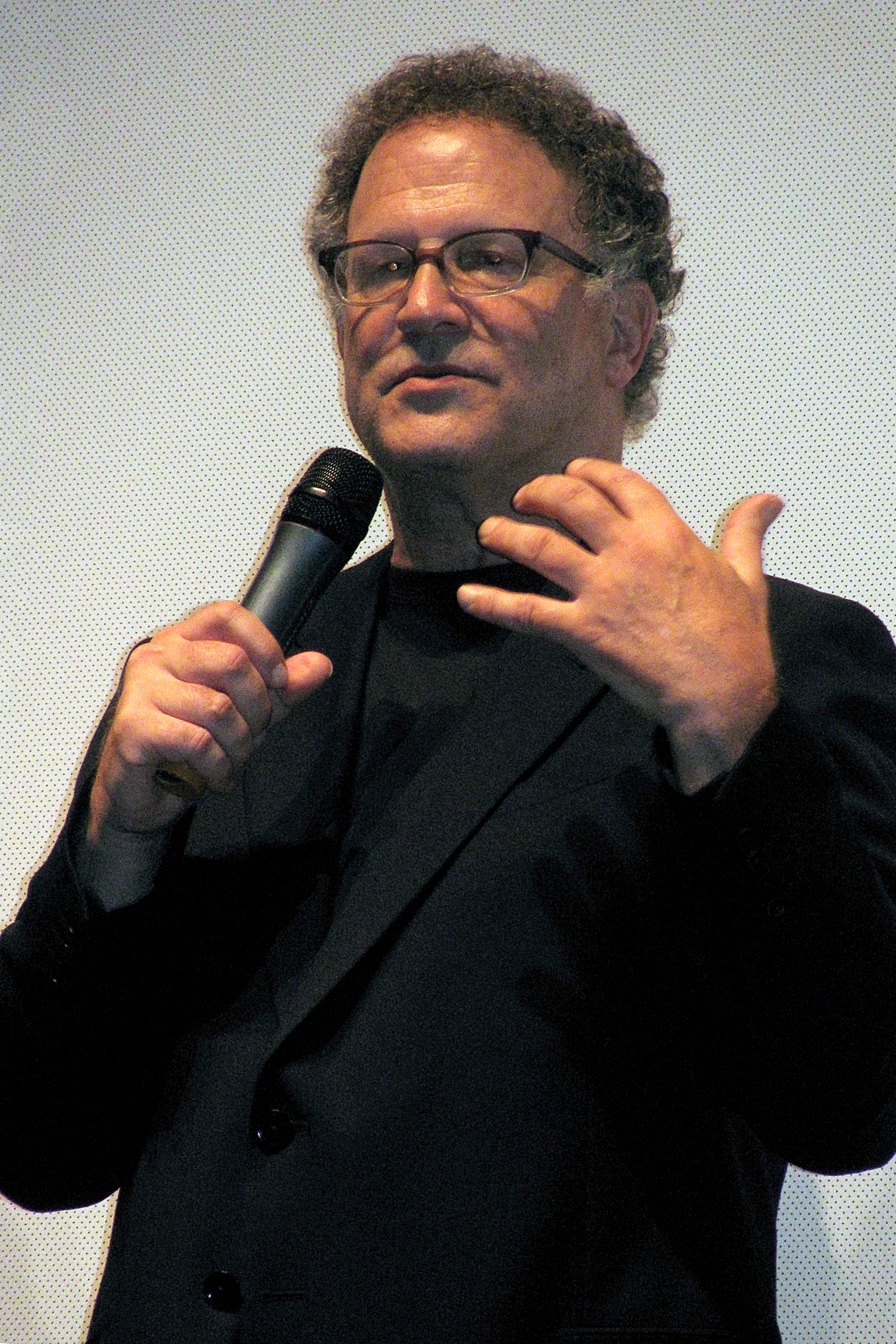
Actor Albert Brooks made the first two of his twelve appearances in season one.

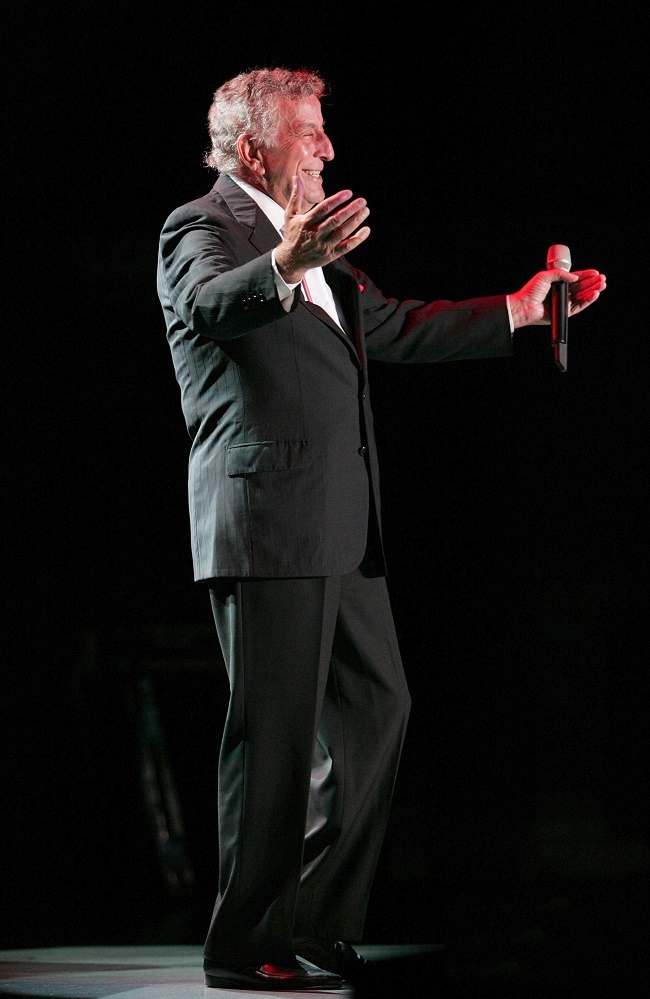
Singer Tony Bennett was the first person to voice himself on the show.

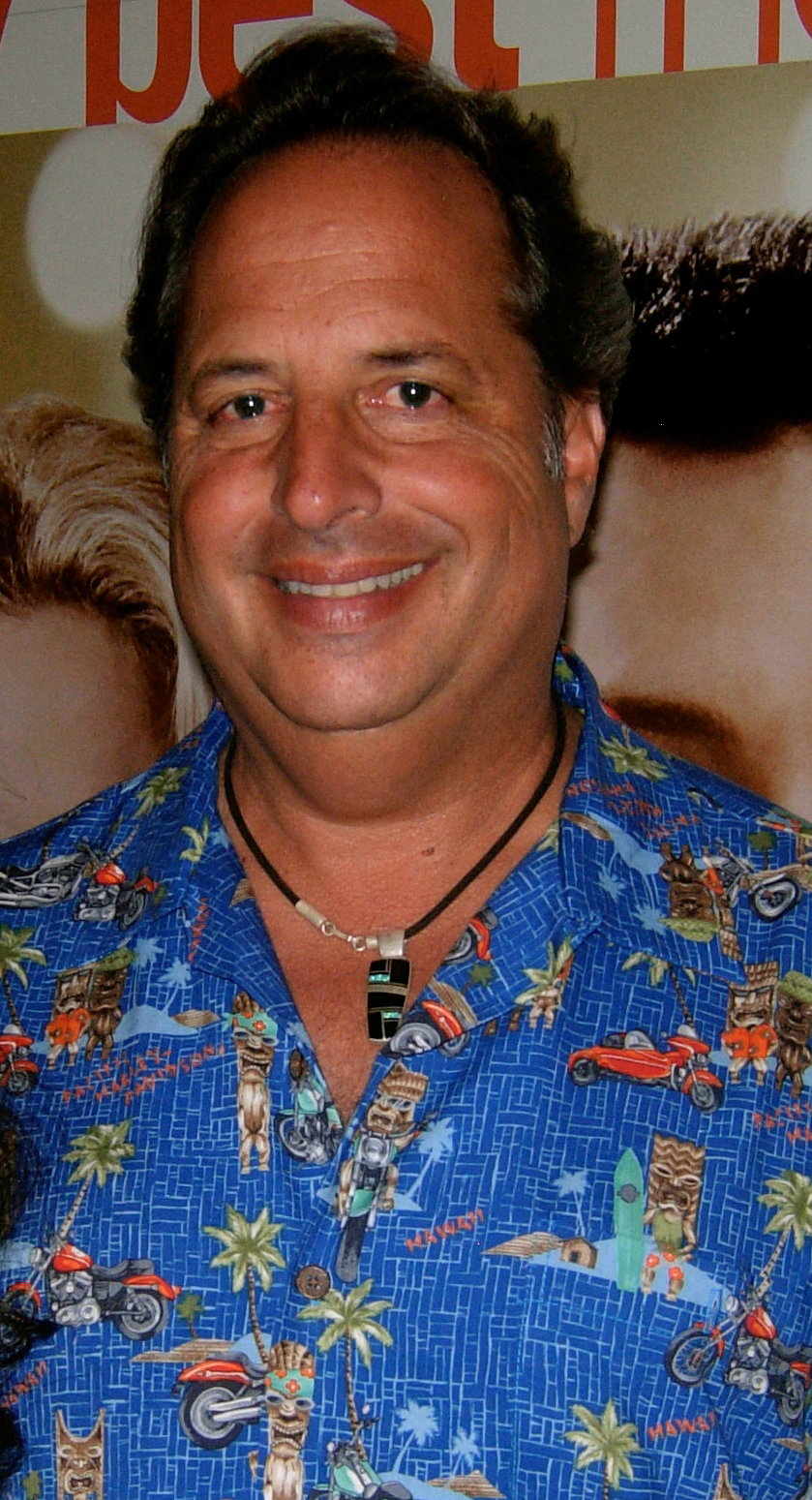
Actor Jon Lovitz has made over twenty appearances on the show including three cross-over appearances as Jay Sherman from the series The Critic.

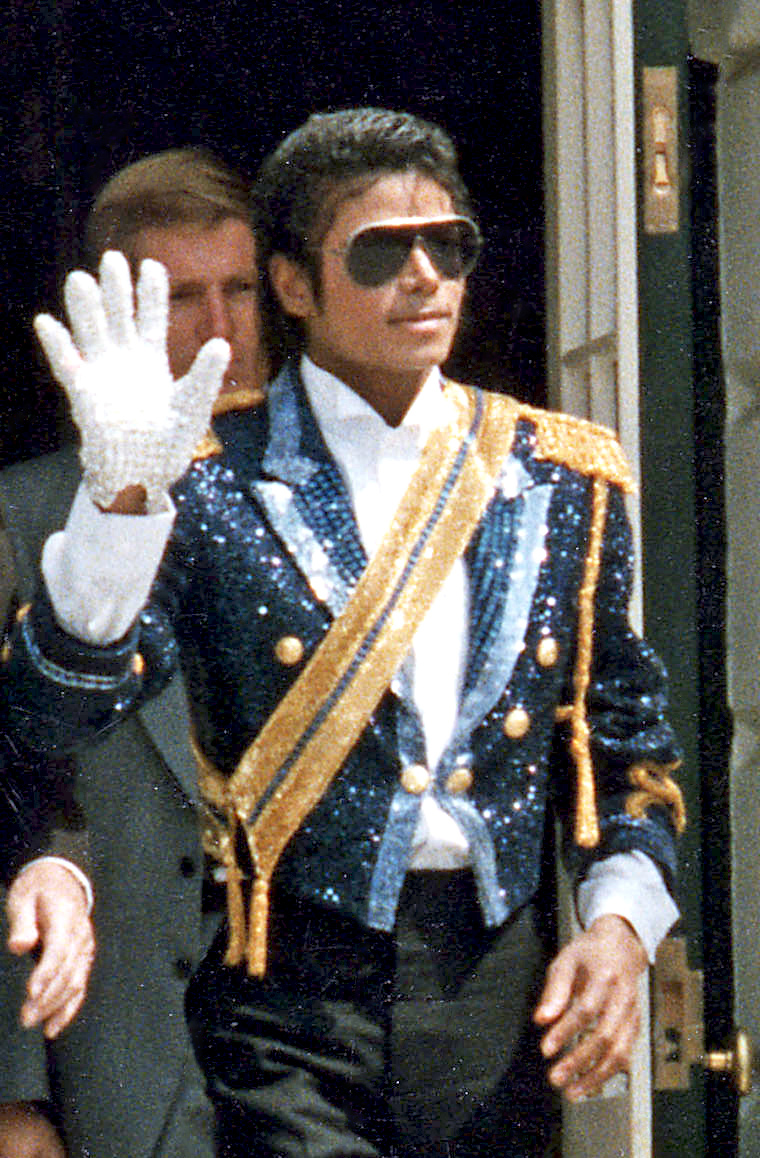
Musician Michael Jackson was credited as "John Jay Smith" for his role in "Stark Raving Dad".

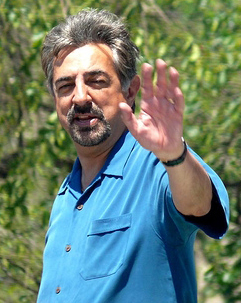
Actor Joe Mantegna voices mobster Fat Tony.

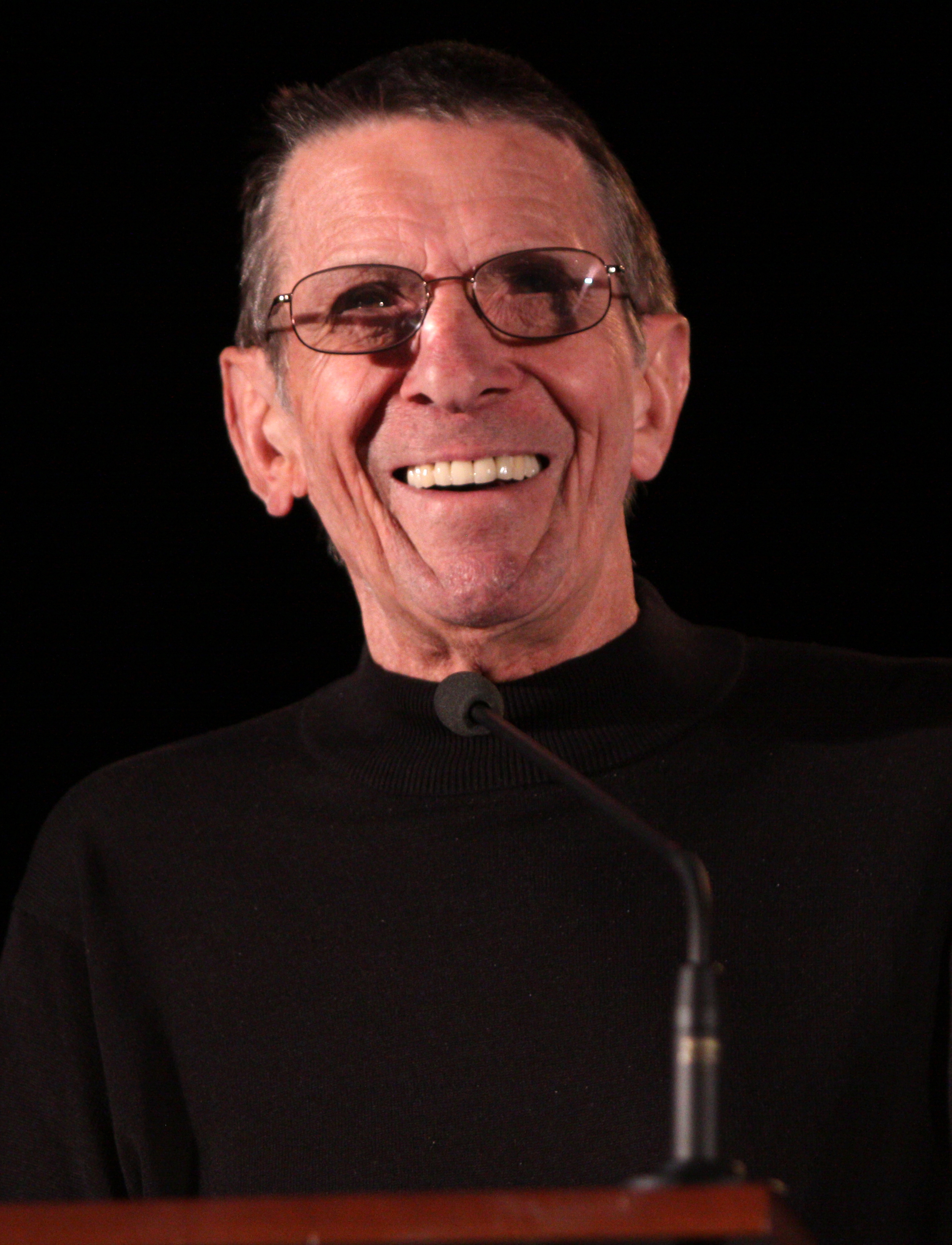
Actor Leonard Nimoy has twice appeared as himself.

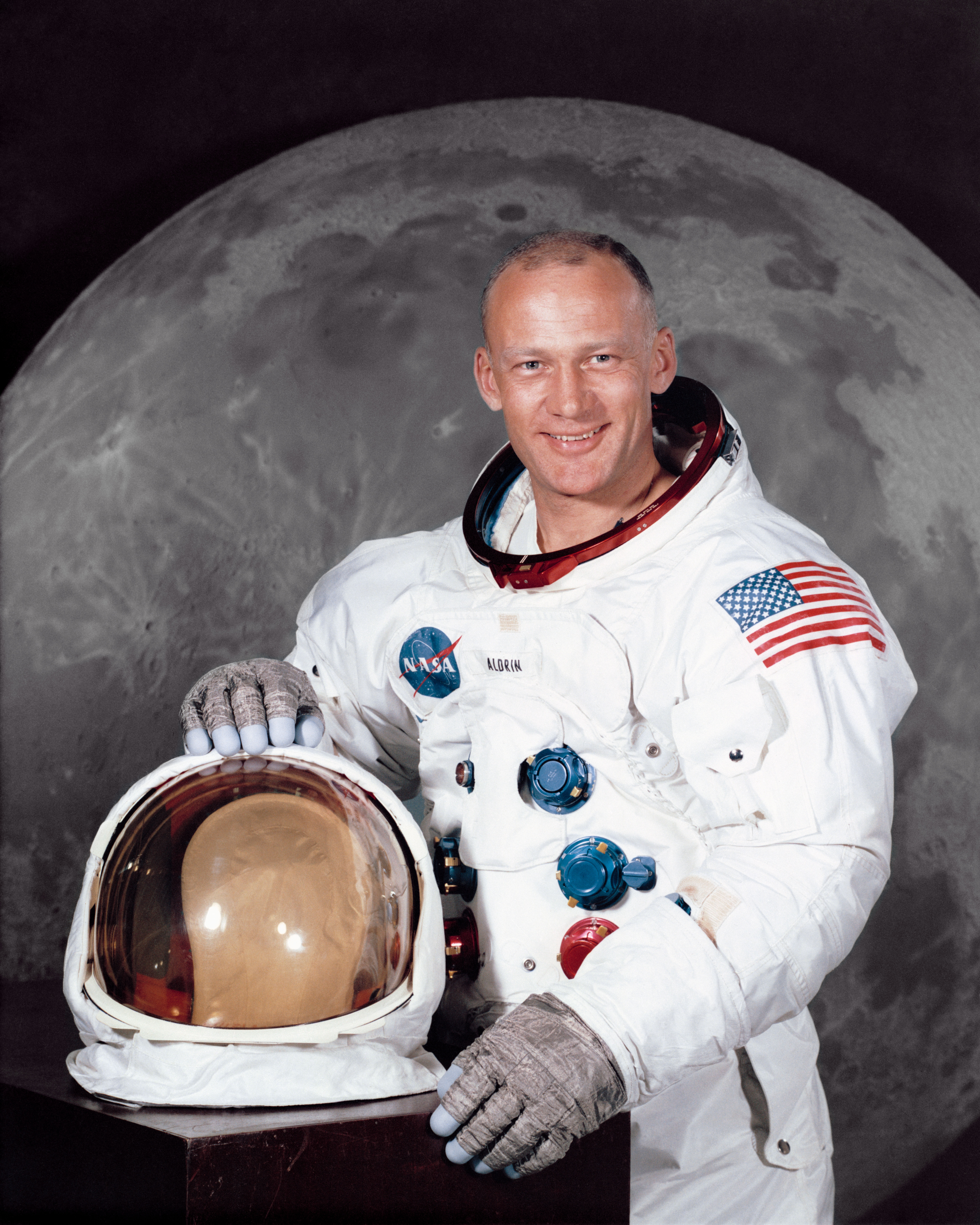
Astronaut Buzz Aldrin appeared in season five's "Deep Space Homer".

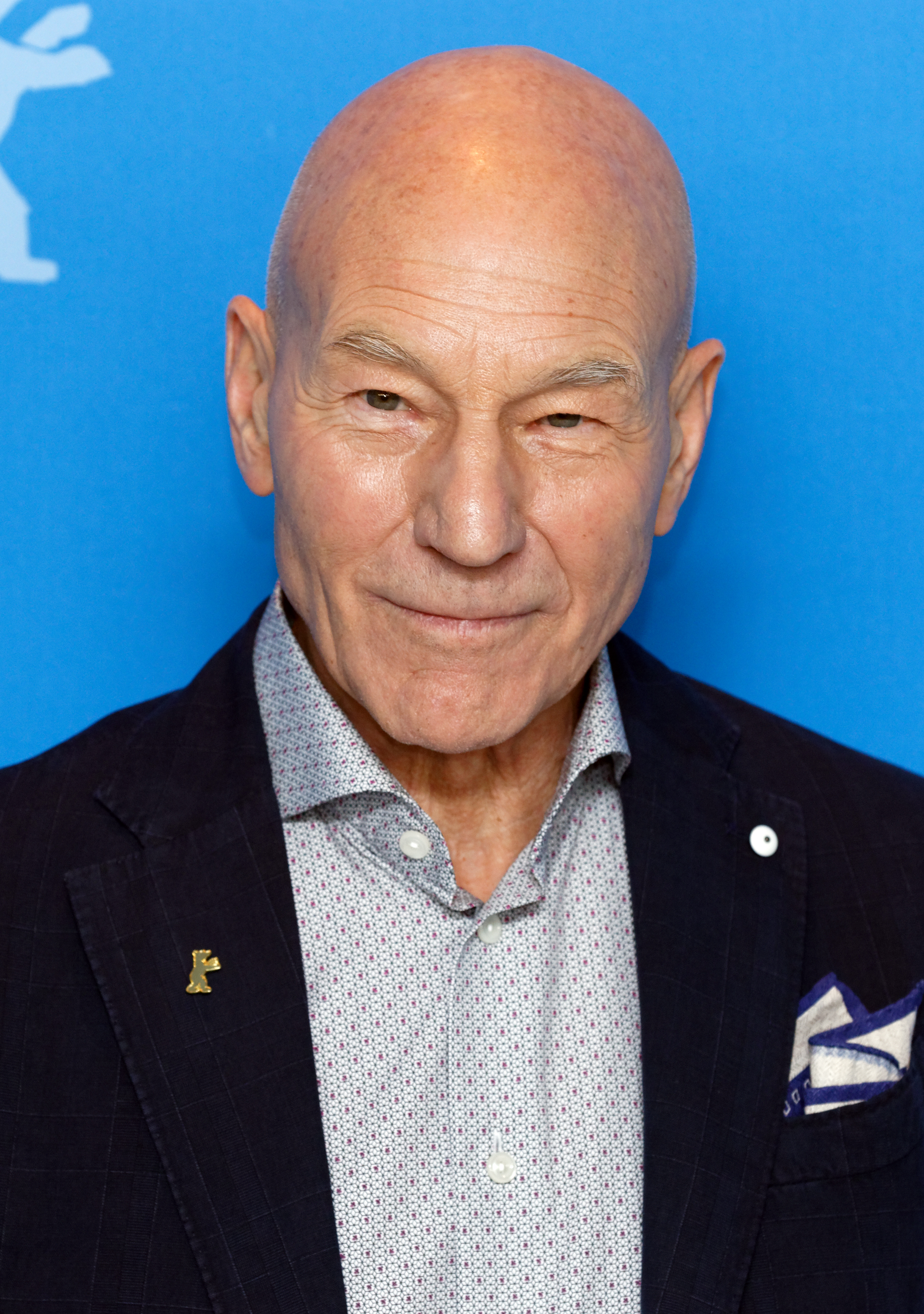
Actor Patrick Stewart voiced Number One in "Homer the Great".

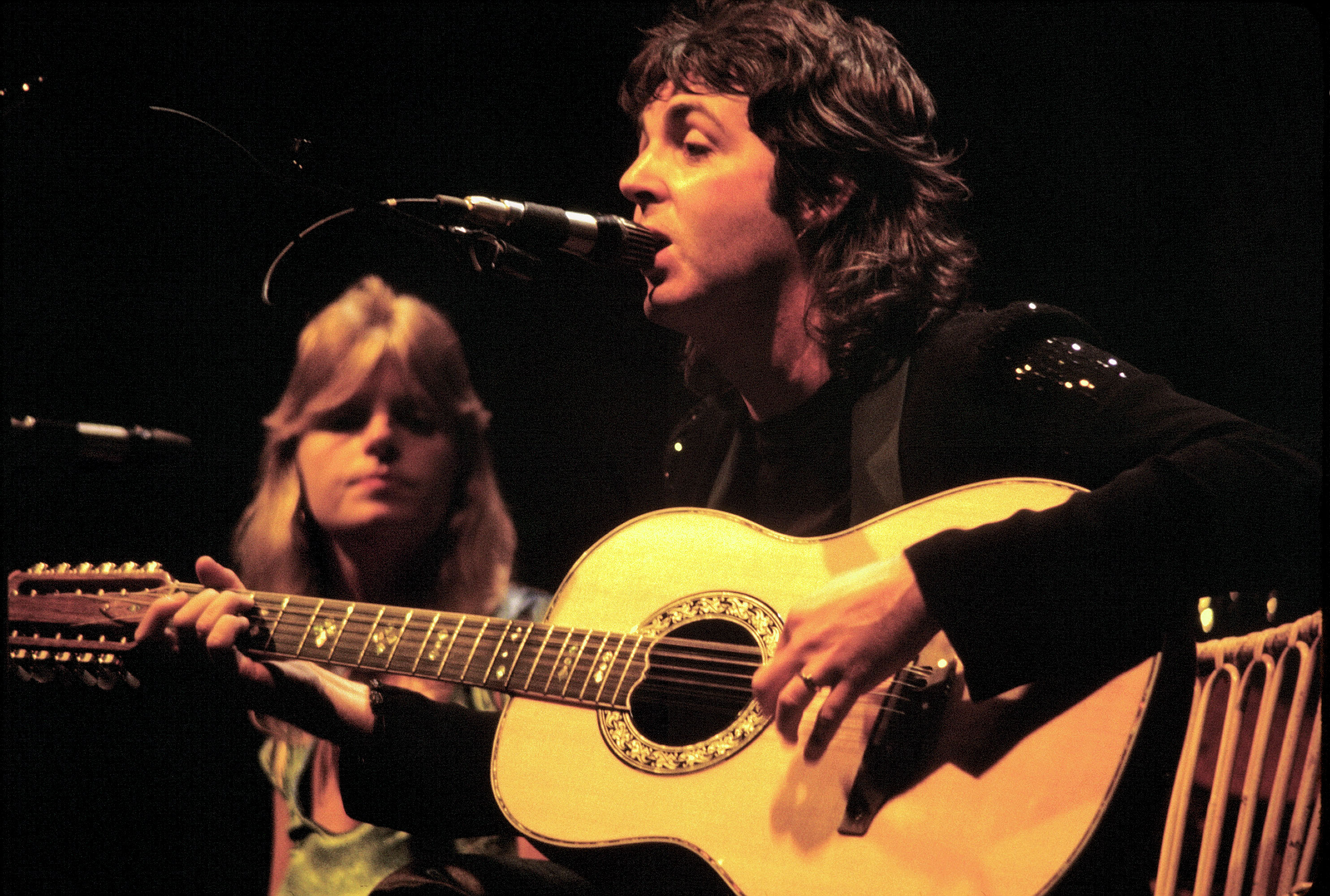
Paul and Linda McCartney guest starred in the episode "Lisa the Vegetarian".

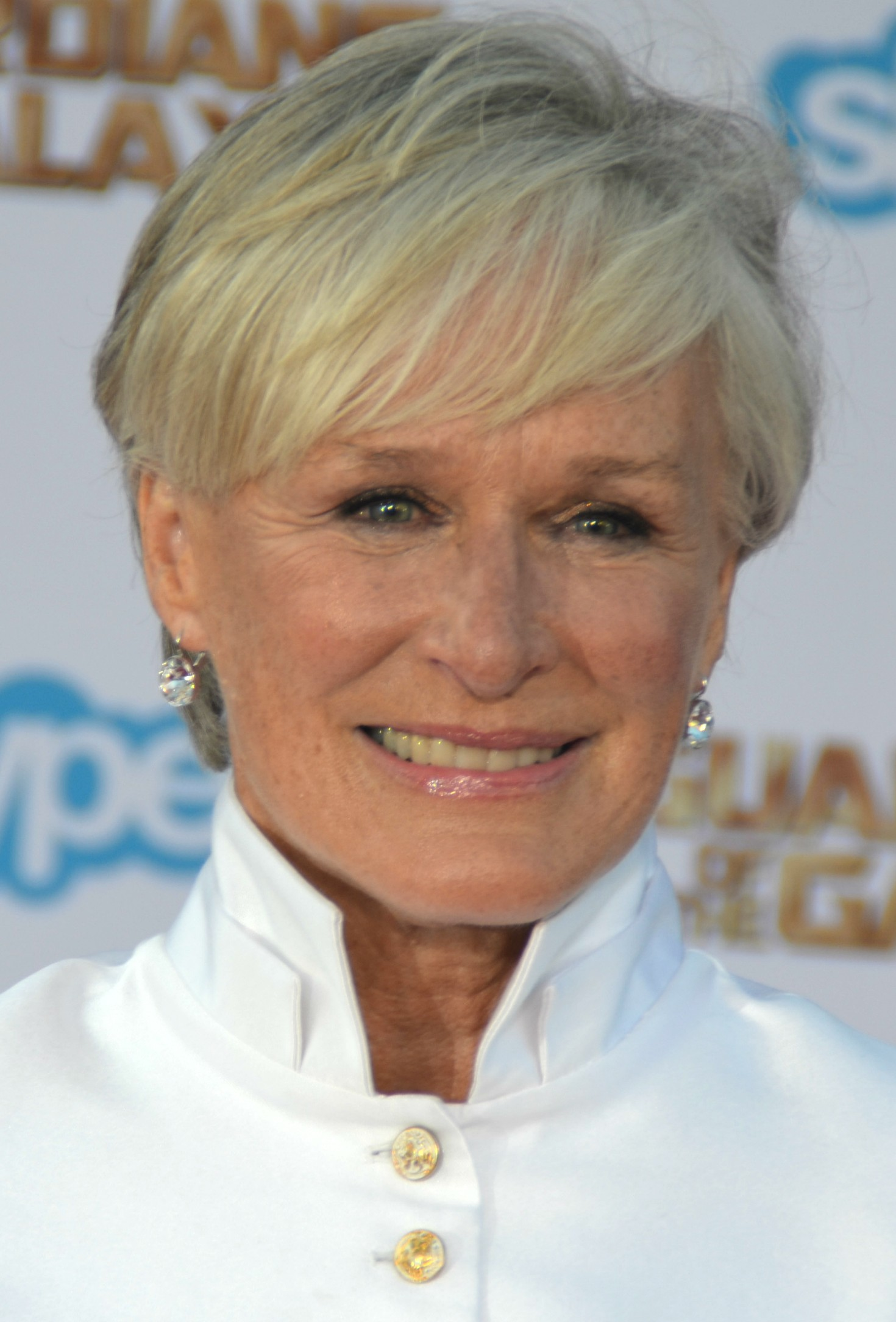
Glenn Close was convinced by show developer James L. Brooks to voice Mona Simpson, the mother of Homer Simpson.

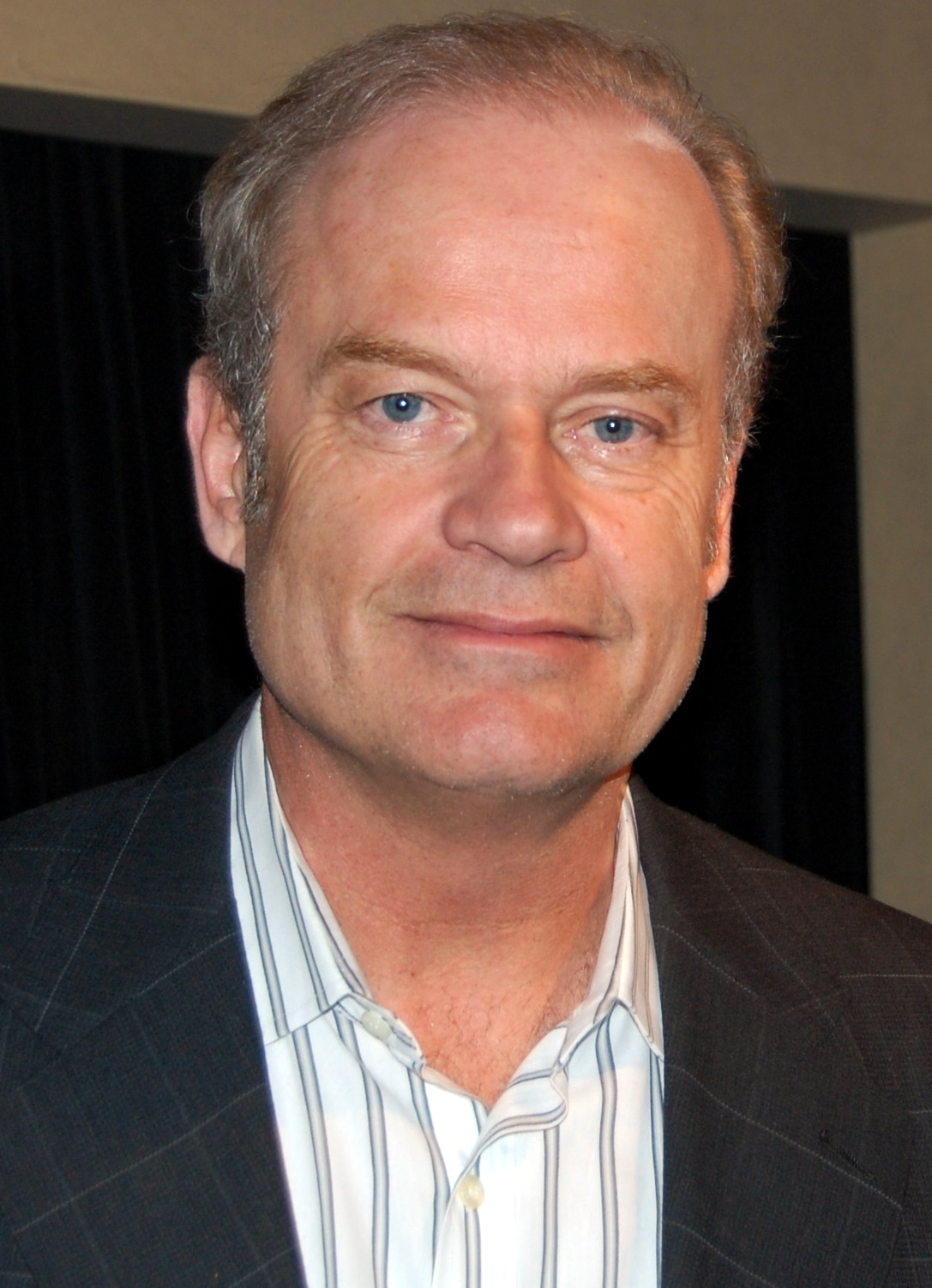
Actor Kelsey Grammer has voiced Sideshow Bob since the show's first season.

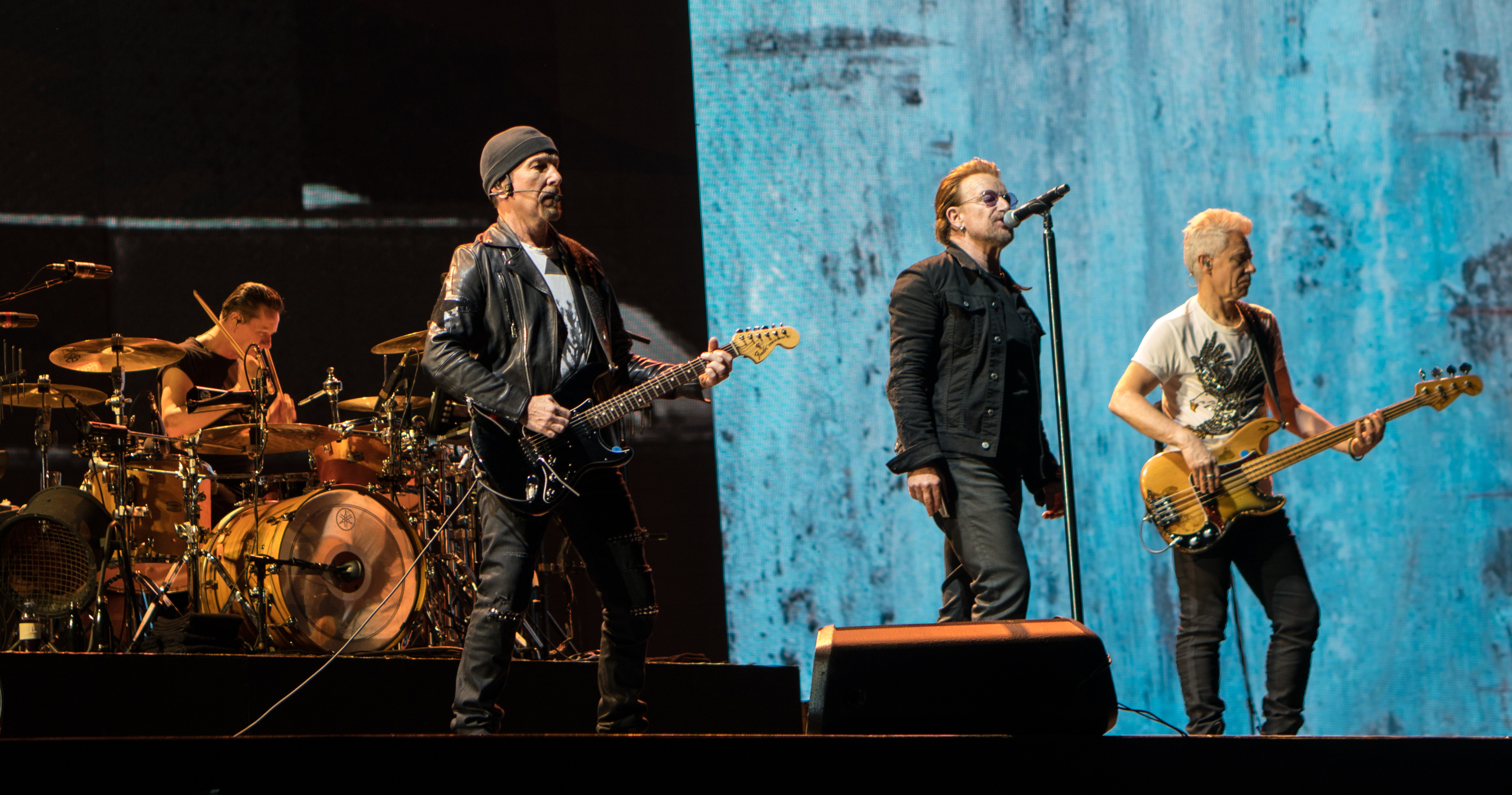
U2 played themselves in "Trash of the Titans", minus Larry Mullen Jr.

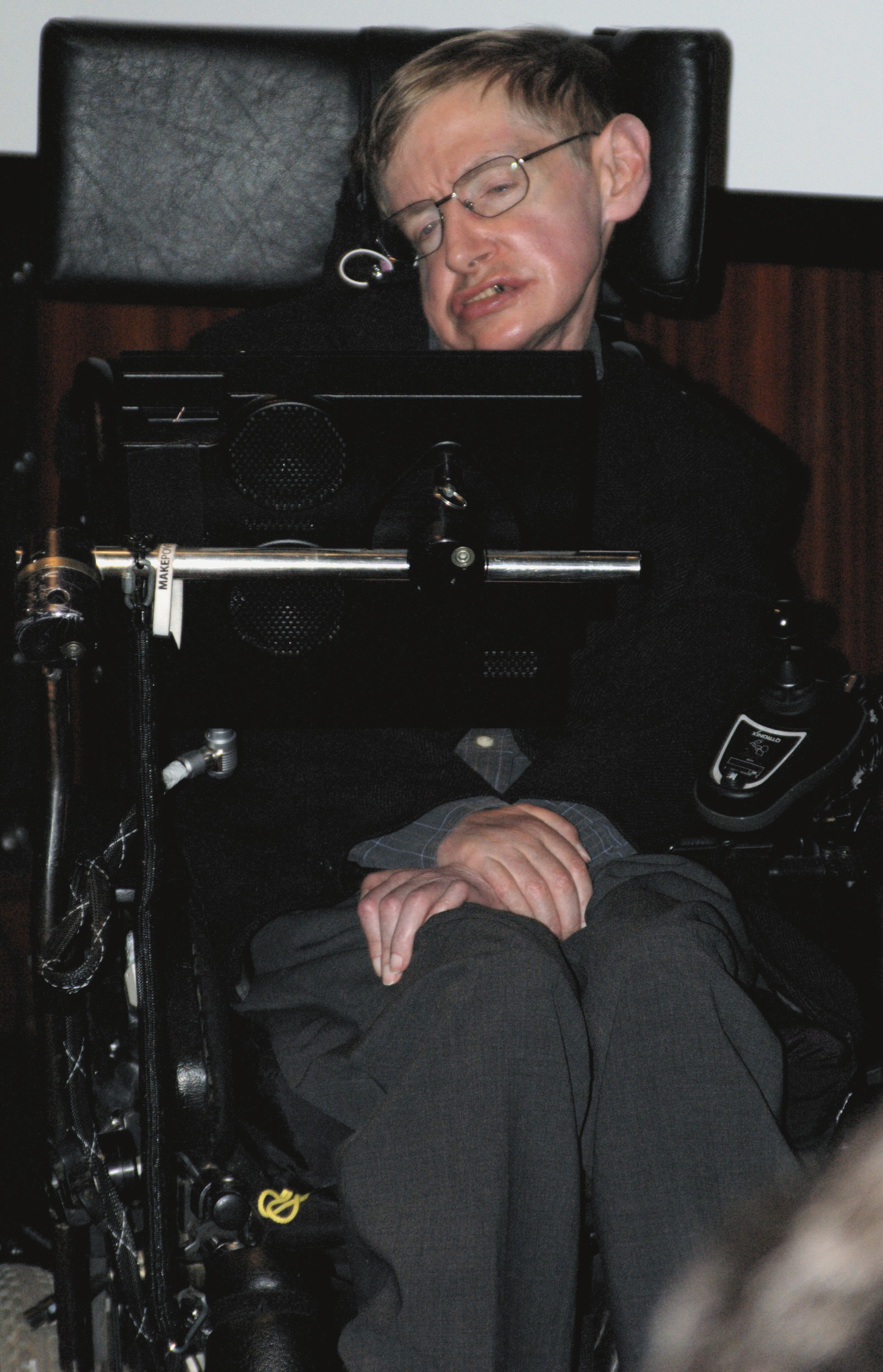
Theoretical physicist Stephen Hawking has made four appearances on the show as himself.

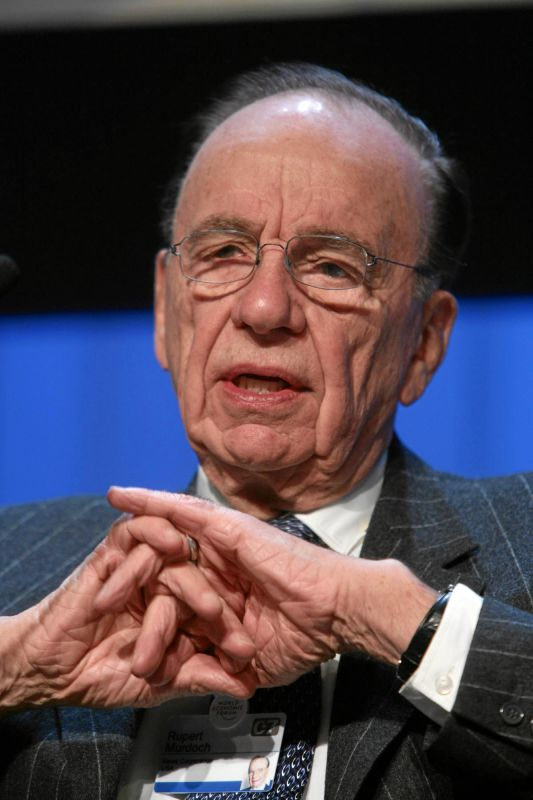
News Corporation founder Rupert Murdoch has featured in two episodes.

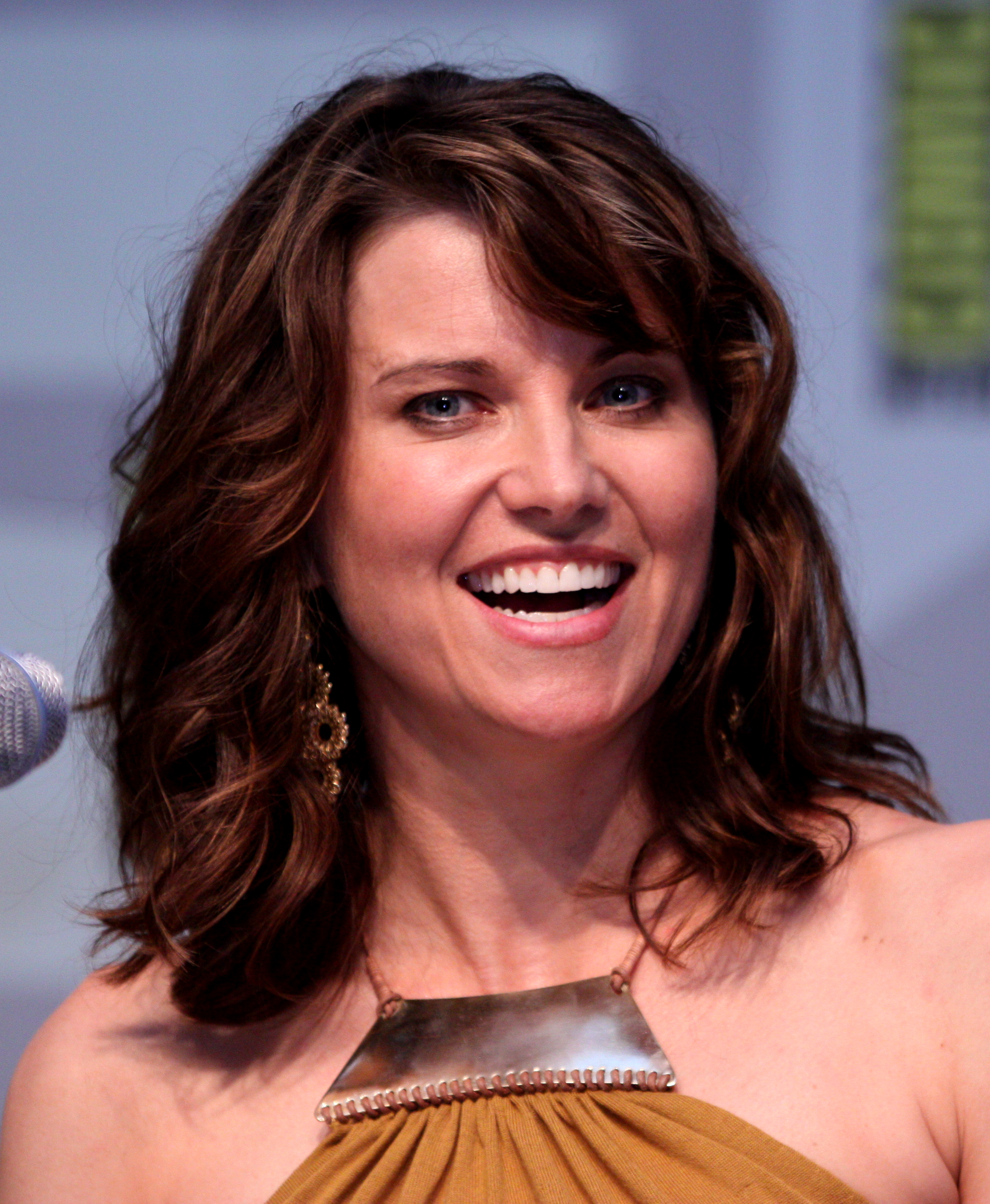
Actress Lucy Lawless appeared as herself in season 11.

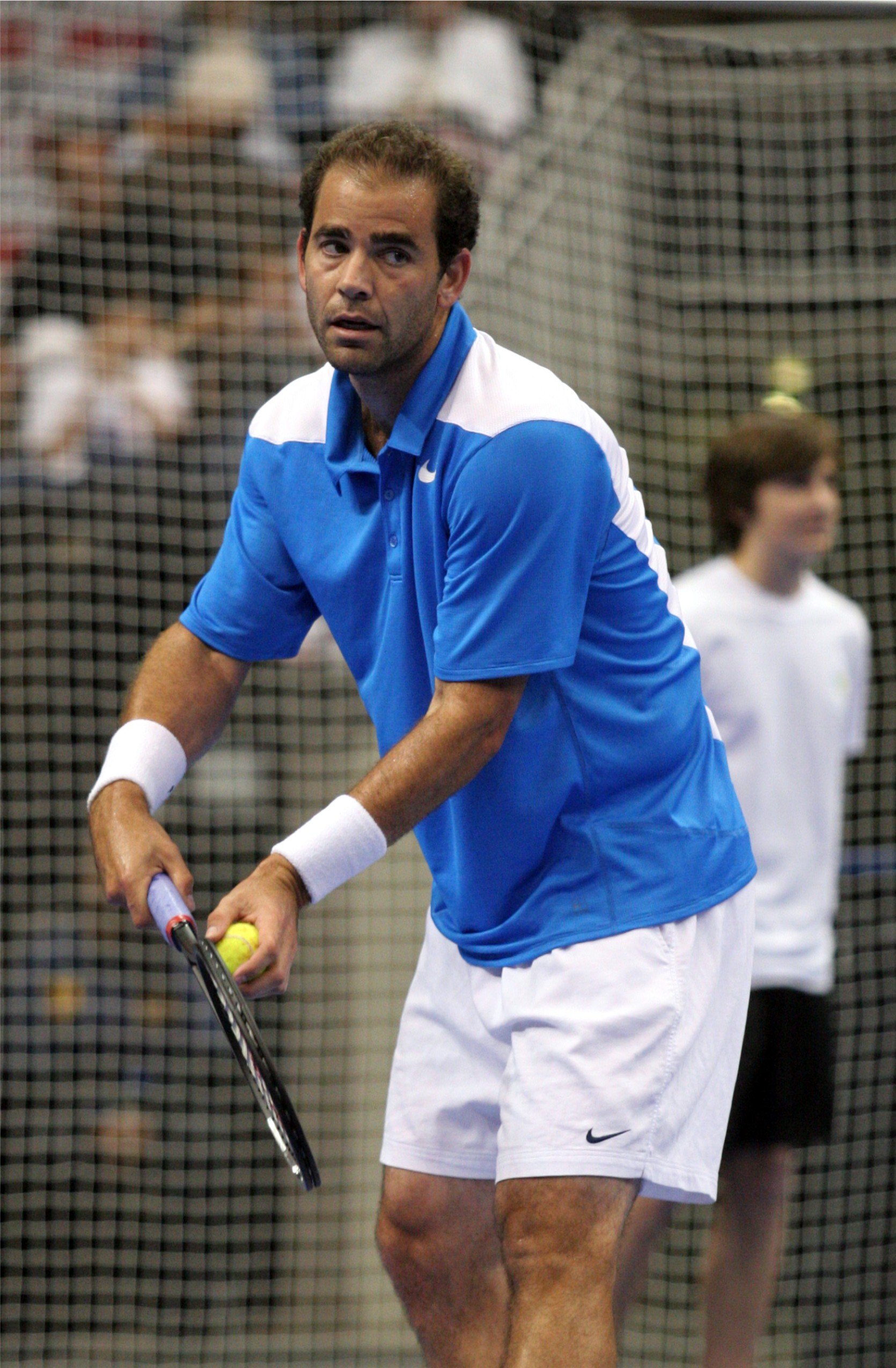
Pete Sampras was one of a number of tennis players to appear in "Tennis the Menace".

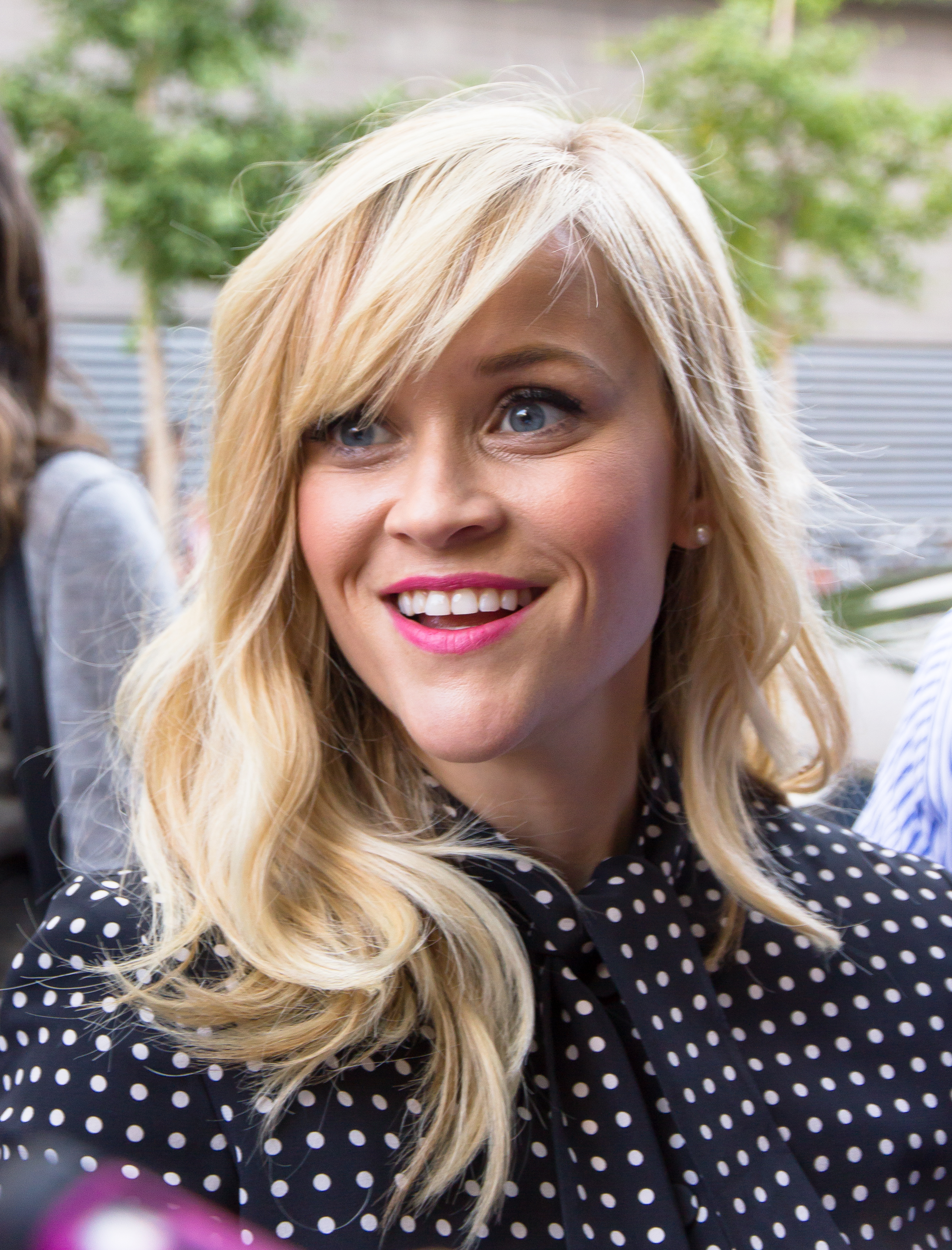
Actress Reese Witherspoon voiced Greta Wolfcastle.

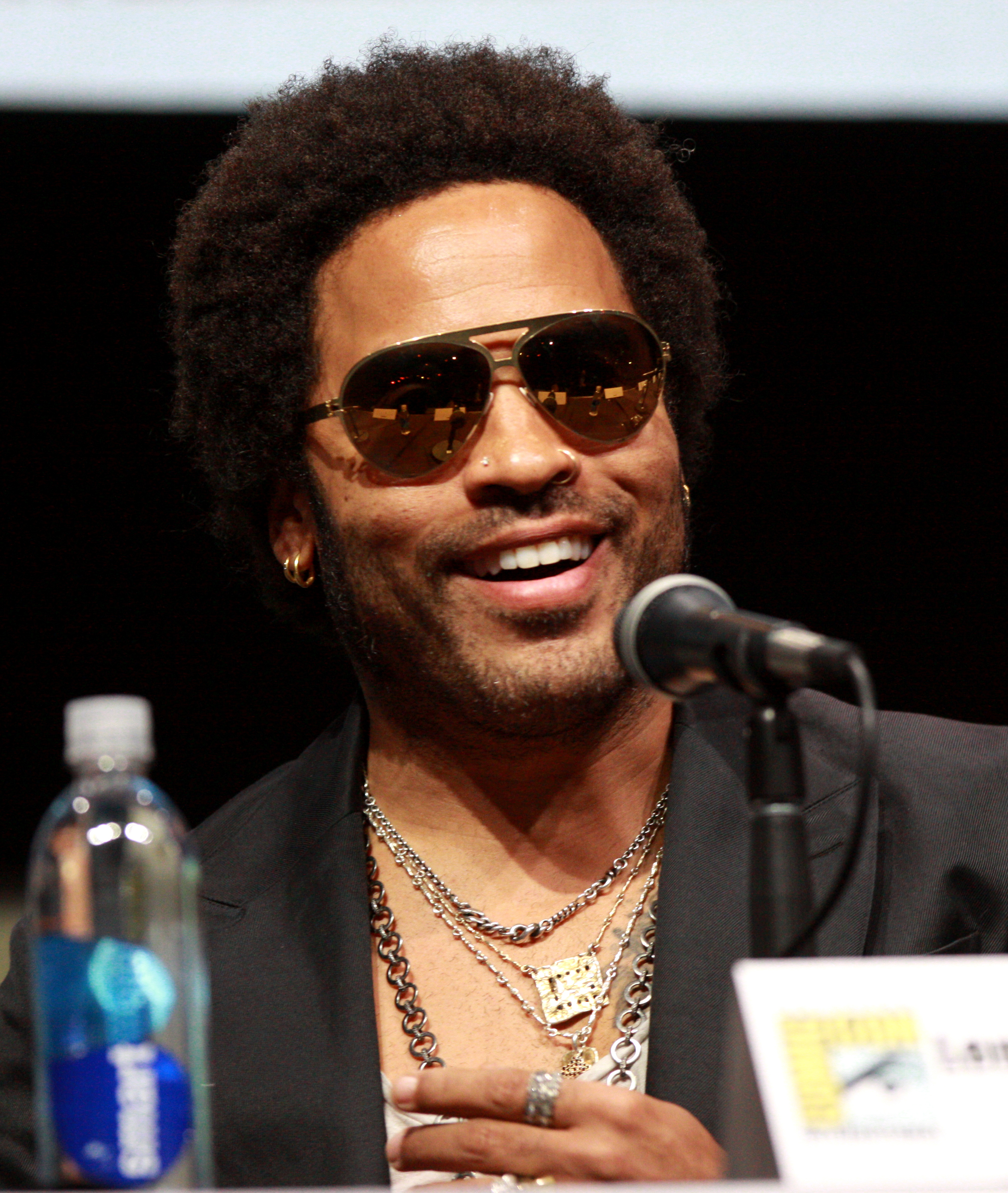
"How I Spent My Strummer Vacation" featured Lenny Kravitz and five other musicians.

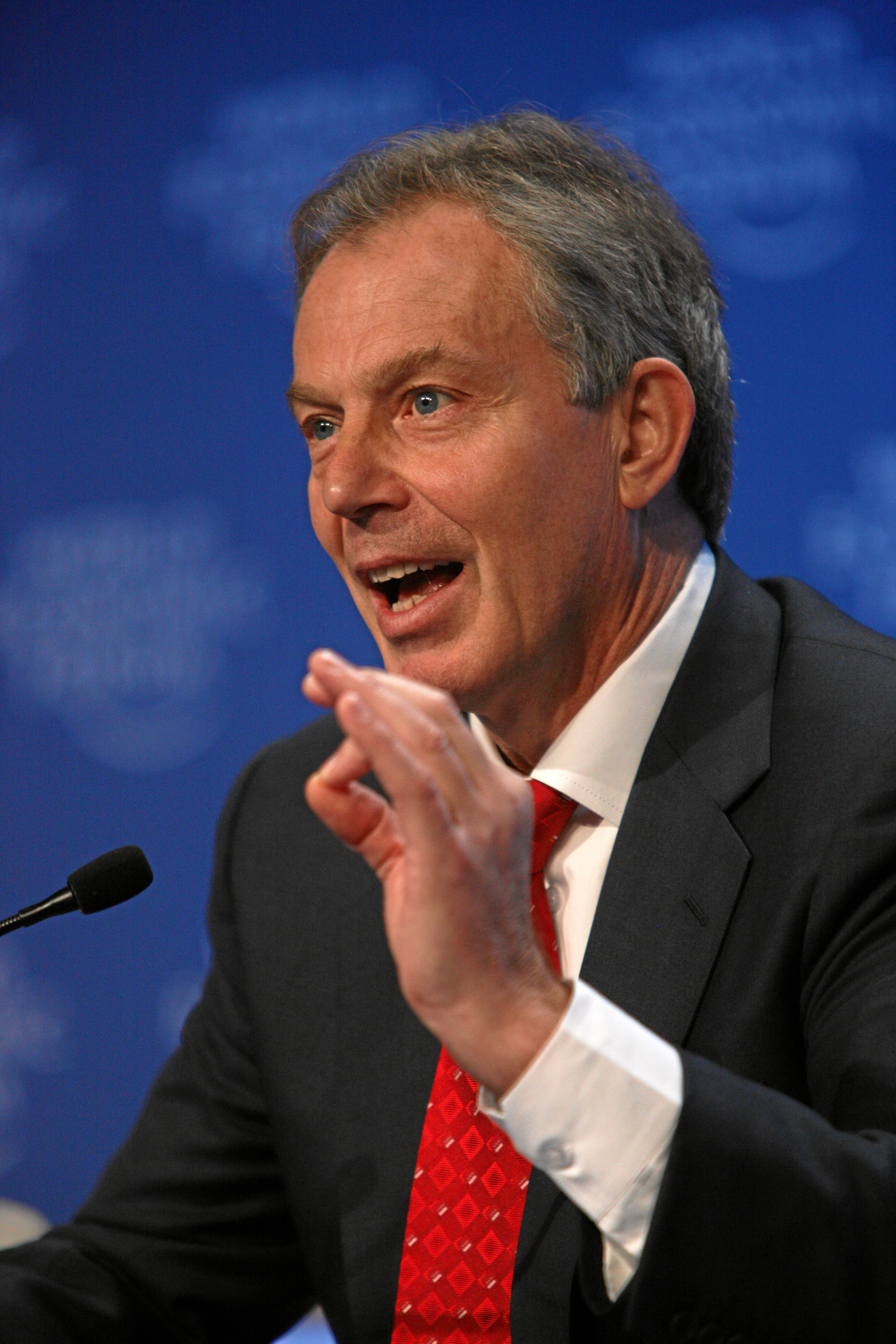
Then Prime Minister of the United Kingdom Tony Blair recorded his part for "The Regina Monologues" at Downing Street and his appearance on the show was used as an opportunity to "promote Britain".

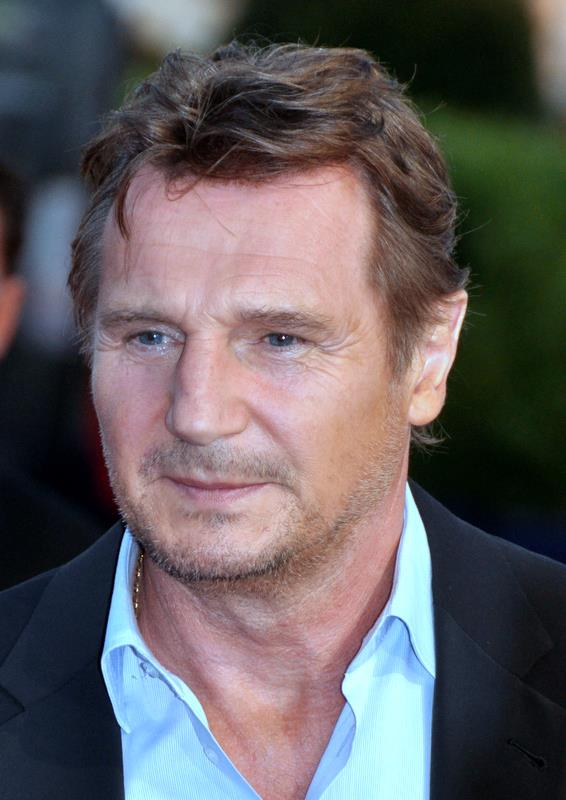
Actor Liam Neeson voiced priest Father Sean.

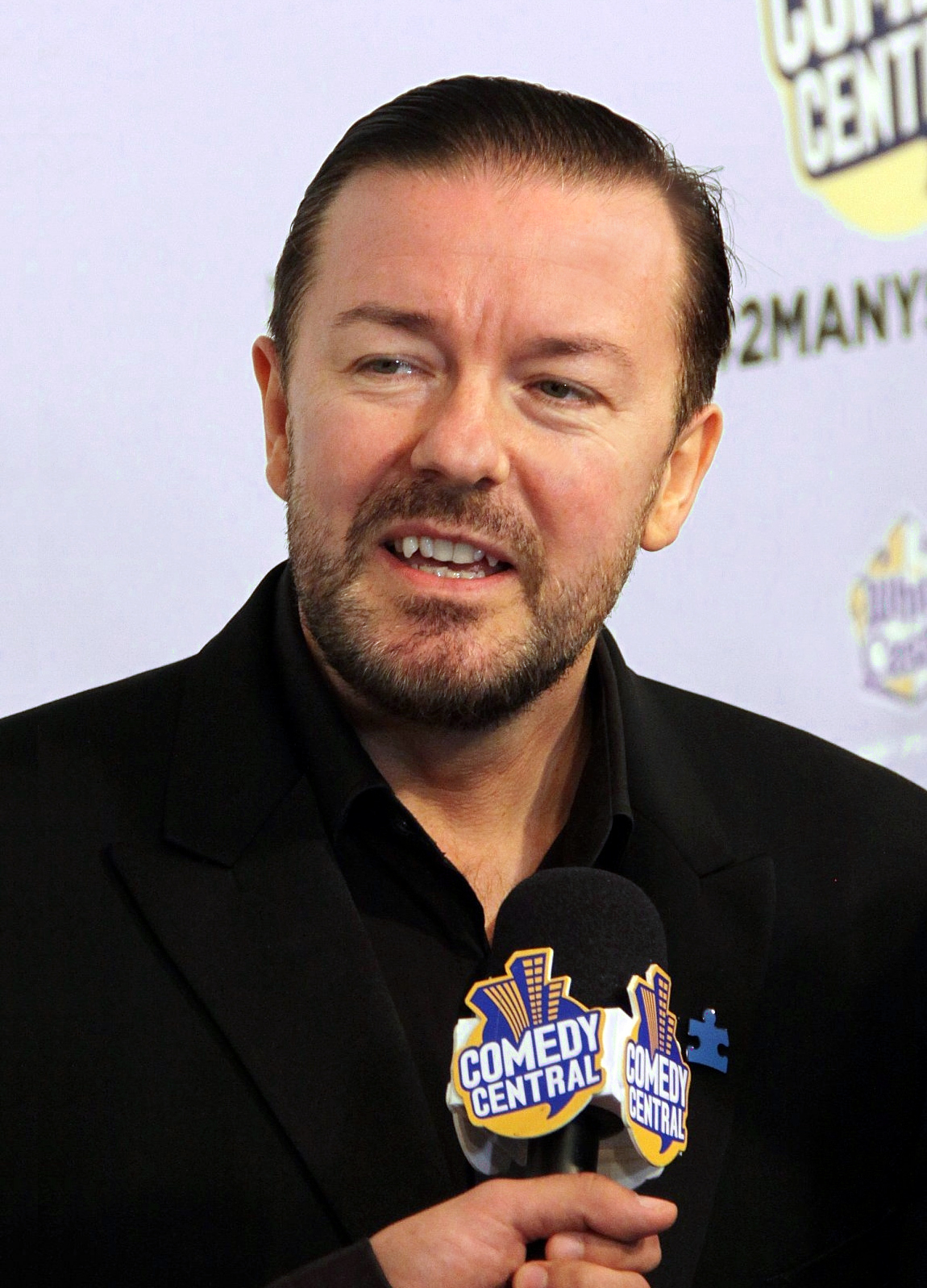
Comedian Ricky Gervais has appeared twice; he wrote "Homer Simpson, This is Your Wife", his first episode.

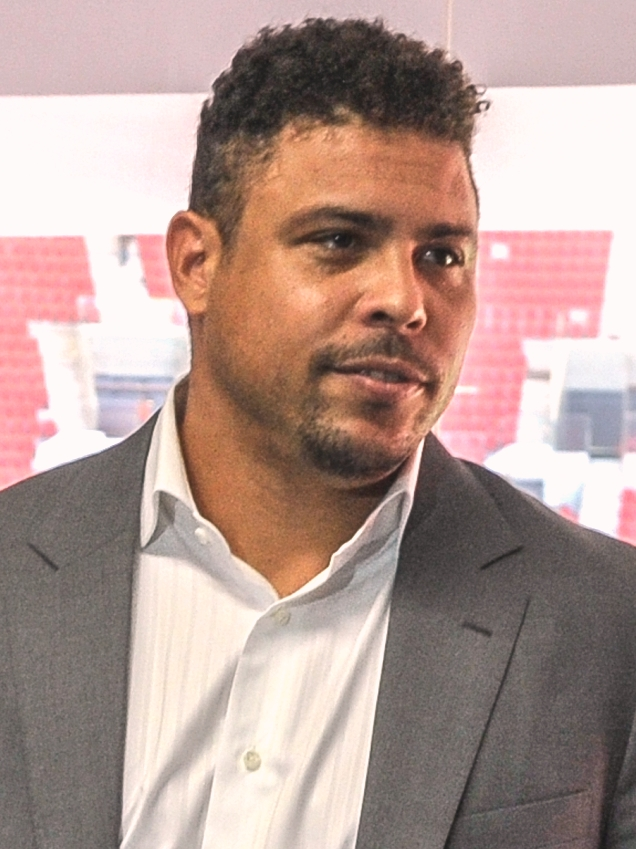
Ronaldo is the only soccer player to appear on the show.

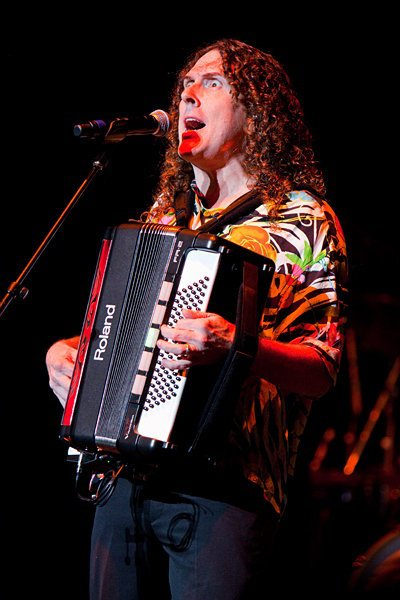
Musician "Weird Al" Yankovic has appeared three times.

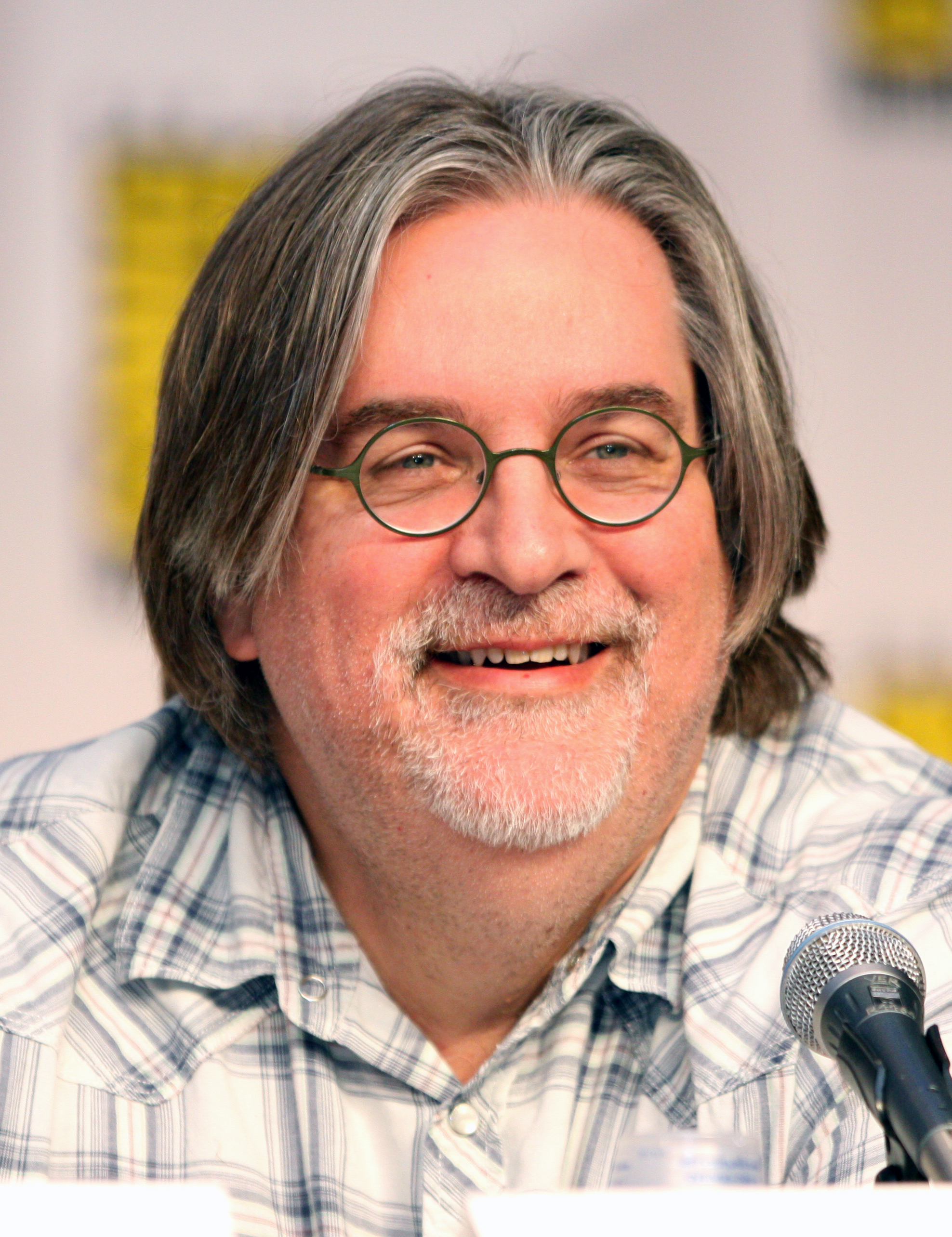
Matt Groening, the show's creator, has voiced himself twice.

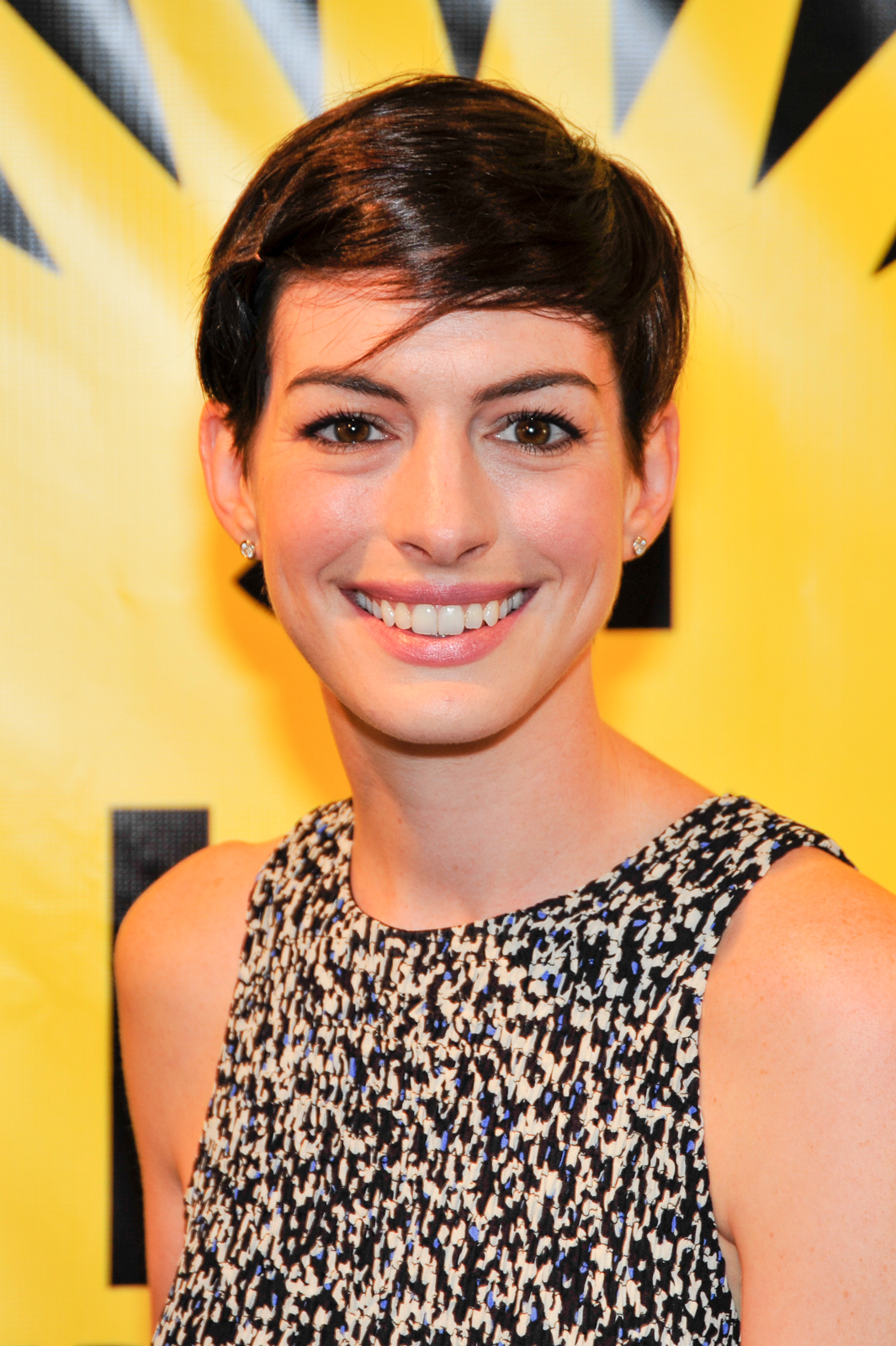
Actress Anne Hathaway won a Primetime Emmy Award for her role in "Once Upon a Time in Springfield".

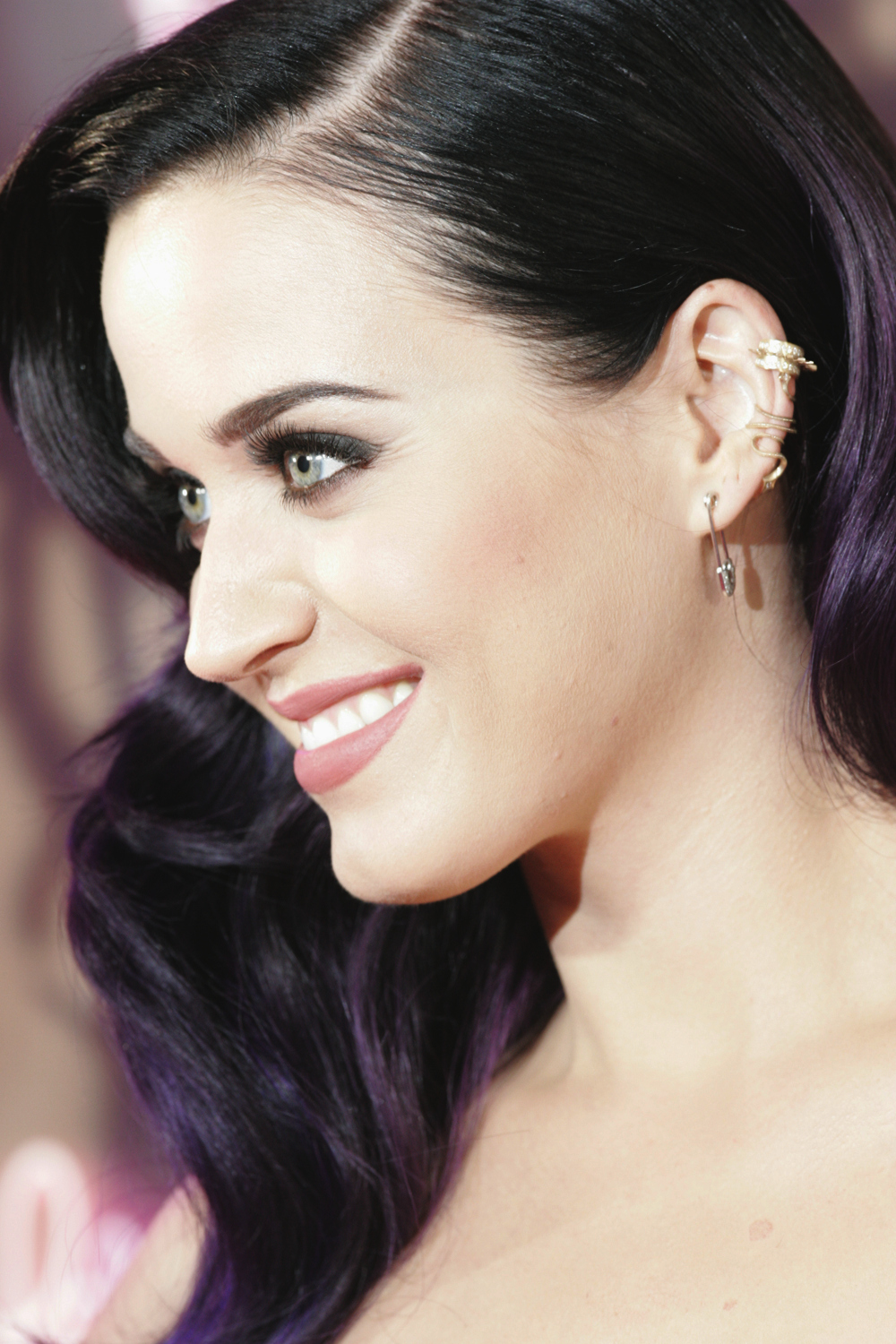
Singer Katy Perry appeared in live-action in "The Fight Before Christmas".

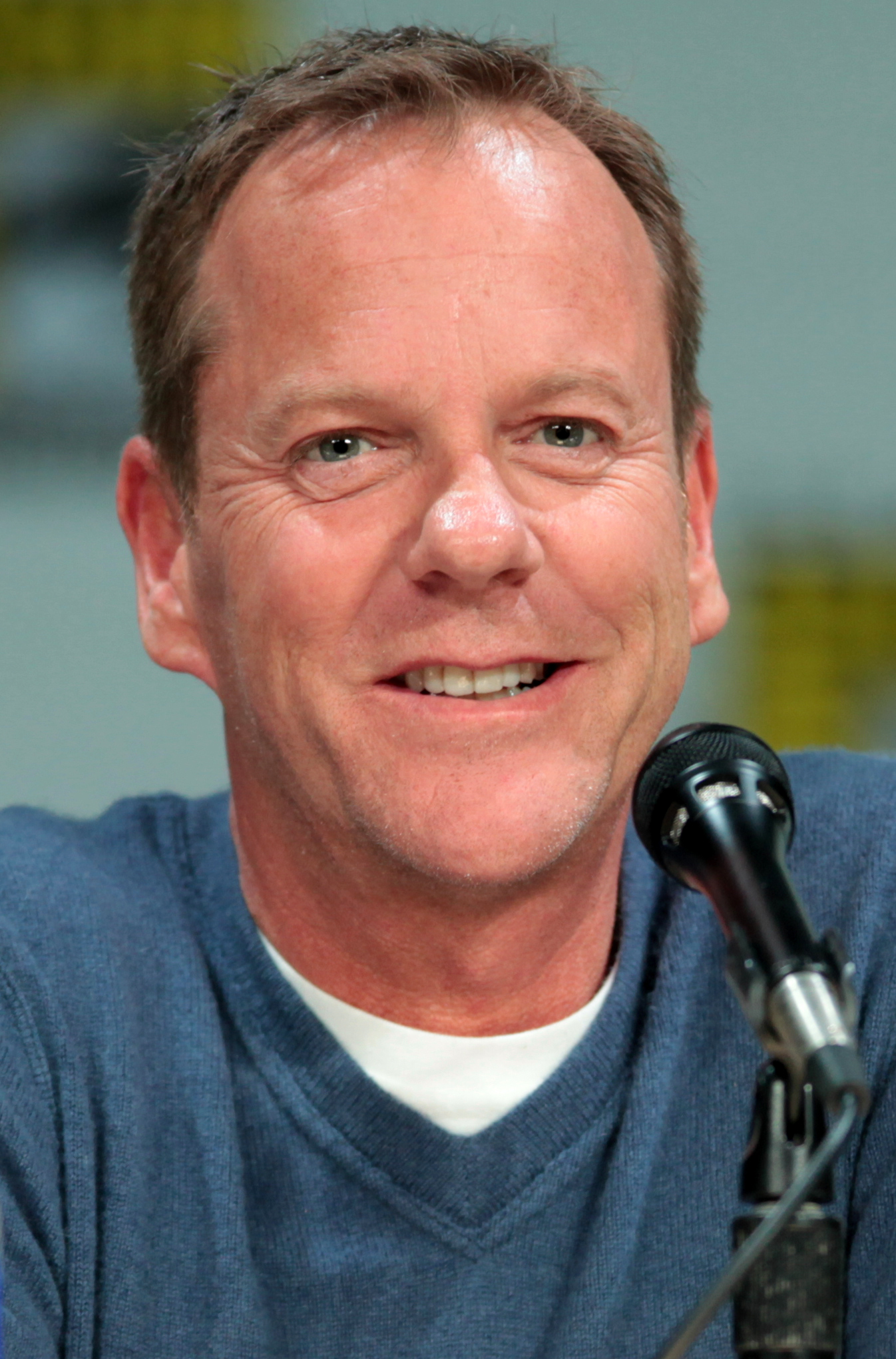
Actor Kiefer Sutherland has voiced three characters on the show, including Jack Bauer from 24.

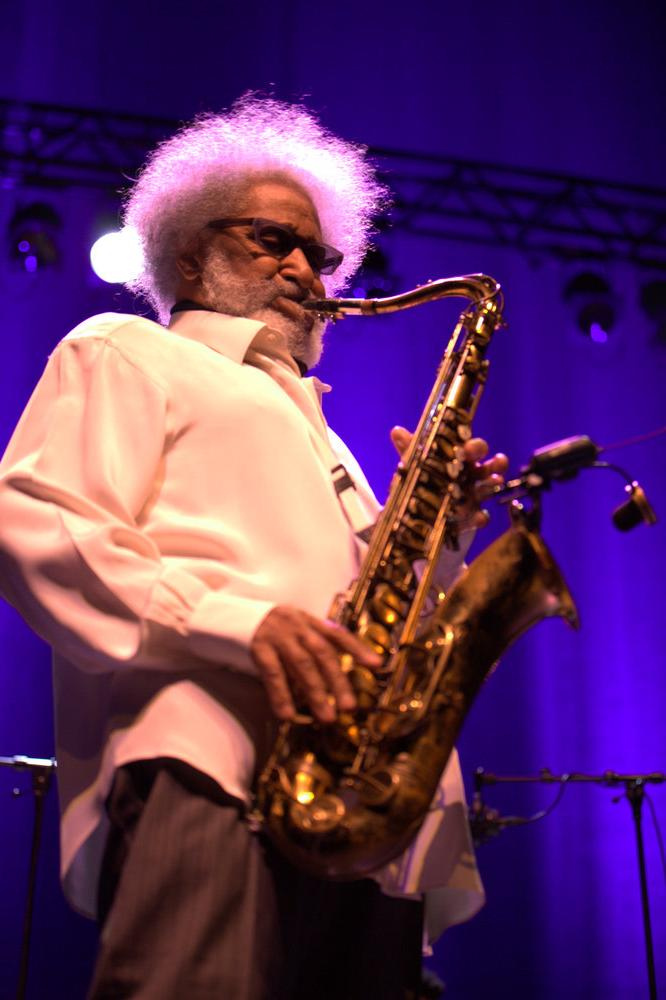
Jazz musician Sonny Rollins voiced himself in "Whiskey Business".

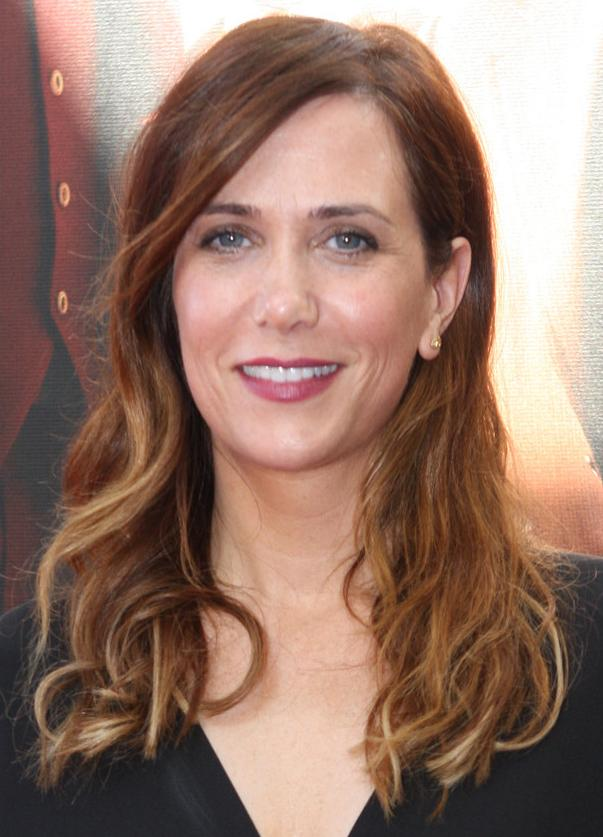
Actress Kristen Wiig has played two different characters on the show.

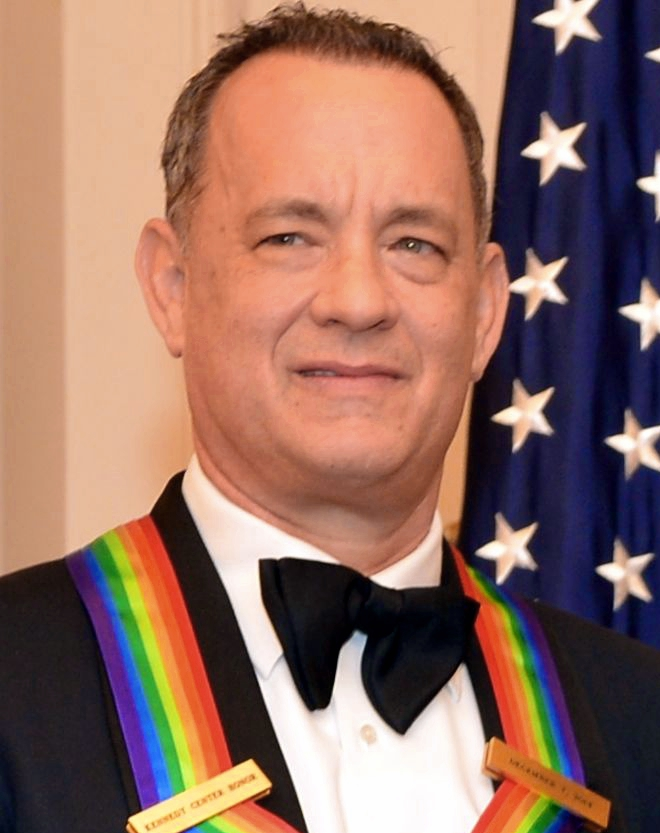
Actor Tom Hanks played himself in both The Simpsons Movie and in the Season 36 premiere episode "Bart's Birthday".

Season	Guest star	Role(s)	No.	Prod. code	Episode title
21	Matt Groening	Himself	442–2101	LABF13	"Homer the Whopper"
21	Kevin Michael Richardson	Security guard	442–2101	LABF13	"Homer the Whopper"
21	Seth Rogen	Lyle McCarthy	442–2101	LABF13	"Homer the Whopper"
21	Marcia Wallace	Edna Krabappel	443–2102	LABF15	"Bart Gets a 'Z'"
21	Chuck Liddell	Himself	444–2103	LABF16	"The Great Wife Hope"
21	Marcia Wallace	Edna Krabappel	444–2103	LABF16	"The Great Wife Hope"
21	Marcia Wallace	Edna Krabappel	445–2104	LABF14	"Treehouse of Horror XX"
21	Marcia Wallace	Edna Krabappel	446–2105	LABF17	"The Devil Wears Nada"
21	Jonah Hill	Andy Hamilton	447–2106	LABF18	"Pranks and Greens"
21	Marcia Wallace	Edna Krabappel	447–2106	LABF18	"Pranks and Greens"
21	Neve Campbell	Cassandra	448–2107	LABF19	"Rednecks and Broomsticks"
21	Kim Cattrall	Fourth Simpson child	449–2108	MABF01	"O Brother, Where Bart Thou?"
21	Huell Howser	Himself	449–2108	MABF01	"O Brother, Where Bart Thou?"
21	Cooper Manning	Himself	449–2108	MABF01	"O Brother, Where Bart Thou?"
21	Eli Manning	Himself	449–2108	MABF01	"O Brother, Where Bart Thou?"
21	Peyton Manning	Himself	449–2108	MABF01	"O Brother, Where Bart Thou?"
21	Jordan Nagai	Charlie	449–2108	MABF01	"O Brother, Where Bart Thou?"
21	Smothers Brothers (Note: Consisting of Dick Smothers and Tom Smothers)	Themselves	449–2108	MABF01	"O Brother, Where Bart Thou?"
21	Mitch Albom	Himself	450–2109	MABF02	"Thursdays with Abie"
21	Marcia Wallace	Edna Krabappel	450–2109	MABF02	"Thursdays with Abie"
21	Anne Hathaway	Princess Penelope	451–2110	LABF20	"Once Upon a Time in Springfield"
21	Eartha Kitt	Herself	451–2110	LABF20	"Once Upon a Time in Springfield"
21	Maurice LaMarche	Nuclear Power Plant Guard	451–2110	LABF20	"Once Upon a Time in Springfield"
21	Gary Larson	Himself	451–2110	LABF20	"Once Upon a Time in Springfield"
21	Jackie Mason	Rabbi Hyman Krustofsky	451–2110	LABF20	"Once Upon a Time in Springfield"
21	Chris Martin (Note: While the entirety of the band Coldplay were animated playing music in the episode, only Martin had any individual lines and was credited.)	Himself	452–2111	MABF03	"Million Dollar Maybe"
21	Marcia Wallace	Edna Krabappel	452–2111	MABF03	"Million Dollar Maybe"
21	Bob Costas	Himself	453–2112	MABF05	"Boy Meets Curl"
21	Wren T. Brown	Virgil Simpson	454–2113	MABF06	"The Color Yellow"
21	Marcia Wallace	Edna Krabappel	455–2114	MABF04	"Postcards from the Wedge"
21	Angela Bassett	Michelle Obama	456–2115	MABF07	"Stealing First Base"
21	Sarah Silverman	Nikki McKenna	456–2115	MABF07	"Stealing First Base"
21	Sacha Baron Cohen	Jakob	457–2116	MABF10	"The Greatest Story Ever D'ohed"
21	Yael Naim	Dorit	457–2116	MABF10	"The Greatest Story Ever D'ohed"
21	Joe Mantegna	Fat Tony	458–2117	MABF08	"American History X-cellent"
21	Kevin Michael Richardson	Prisoner	458–2117	MABF08	"American History X-cellent"
21	Jane Kaczmarek	Judge Constance Harm	459–2118	MABF09	"Chief of Hearts"
21	Maurice LaMarche	Kenneth "Hutch" Hutchinson	459–2118	MABF09	"Chief of Hearts"
21	Joe Mantegna	Fat Tony	459–2118	MABF09	"Chief of Hearts"
21	Eddie Izzard	Queen Elizabeth II; Prince Charles; Nigel Bakerbutcher	461–2120	MABF12	"To Surveil with Love"
21	Marcia Wallace	Edna Krabappel	461–2120	MABF12	"To Surveil with Love"
21	Don Pardo	Himself	462–2121	MABF13	"Moe Letter Blues"
21	Kelsey Grammer	Sideshow Bob	463–2122	MABF11	"The Bob Next Door"
21	Simon Cowell	Himself	464–2123	MABF15	"Judge Me Tender"
21	Ellen DeGeneres	Herself	464–2123	MABF15	"Judge Me Tender"
21	Kara DioGuardi	Herself	464–2123	MABF15	"Judge Me Tender"
21	Randy Jackson	Himself	464–2123	MABF15	"Judge Me Tender"
21	Rupert Murdoch	Himself	464–2123	MABF15	"Judge Me Tender"
21	Ryan Seacrest	Himself	464–2123	MABF15	"Judge Me Tender"
22	Jemaine Clement	Ethan Ballantyne	465–2201	MABF21	"Elementary School Musical"
22	Ira Glass	Himself	465–2201	MABF21	"Elementary School Musical"
22	Stephen Hawking	Himself	465–2201	MABF21	"Elementary School Musical"
22	Bret McKenzie	Kurt Hardwick	465–2201	MABF21	"Elementary School Musical"
22	Lea Michele	Sarah	465–2201	MABF21	"Elementary School Musical"
22	Cory Monteith	Flynn	465–2201	MABF21	"Elementary School Musical"
22	Amber Riley	Aiesha	465–2201	MABF21	"Elementary School Musical"
22	Terry W. Greene	Janitor	466–2202	MABF17	"Loan-a Lisa"
22	Chris Hansen	Himself	466–2202	MABF17	"Loan-a Lisa"
22	Muhammad Yunus	Himself	466–2202	MABF17	"Loan-a Lisa"
22	Mark Zuckerberg	Himself	466–2202	MABF17	"Loan-a Lisa"
22	Bill James	Himself	467–2203	MABF18	"MoneyBART"
22	Mike Scioscia	Himself	467–2203	MABF18	"MoneyBART"
22	Hugh Laurie	Roger	468–2204	MABF16	"Treehouse of Horror XXI"
22	Daniel Radcliffe	Edmund	468–2204	MABF16	"Treehouse of Horror XXI"
22	Terry W. Greene	Sgt. Activity	470–2206	NABF01	"The Fool Monty"
22	Gregg Berger	Various animals	471–2207	NABF02	"How Munched is That Birdie in the Window?"
22	Danica Patrick	Herself	471–2207	NABF02	"How Munched is That Birdie in the Window?"
22	Marcia Wallace	Edna Krabappel	471–2207	NABF02	"How Munched is That Birdie in the Window?"
22	Rachel Weisz	Dr. Thurston	471–2207	NABF02	"How Munched is That Birdie in the Window?"
22	Katy Perry	Herself (live action)	472–2208	MABF22	"The Fight Before Christmas"
22	Martha Stewart	Herself	472–2208	MABF22	"The Fight Before Christmas"
22	Jon Hamm	FBI agent	473–2209	MABF19	"Donnie Fatso"
22	Joe Mantegna	Fat Tony; Fit Tony	473–2209	MABF19	"Donnie Fatso"
22	Marcia Wallace	Edna Krabappel	474–2210	NABF03	"Moms I'd Like to Forget"
22	Alyson Hannigan	Melody Juniper	475–2211	NABF04	"Flaming Moe"
22	Scott Thompson	Grady	475–2211	NABF04	"Flaming Moe"
22	Kristen Wiig	Calliope Juniper	475–2211	NABF04	"Flaming Moe"
22	Michael Paul Chan	Chinese agent	476–2212	NABF05	"Homer the Father"
22	James Lipton	Himself	476–2212	NABF05	"Homer the Father"
22	David Mamet	Himself	476–2212	NABF05	"Homer the Father"
22	Garry Marshall	Sheldon Leavitt	476–2212	NABF05	"Homer the Father"
22	Marcia Wallace	Edna Krabappel	477–2213	NABF06	"The Blue and the Gray"
22	Halle Berry	Herself	478–2214	NABF07	"Angry Dad: The Movie"
22	Russell Brand	Himself	478–2214	NABF07	"Angry Dad: The Movie"
22	Ricky Gervais	Himself	478–2214	NABF07	"Angry Dad: The Movie"
22	Terry W. Greene	Ridley Scott Seat Filler	478–2214	NABF07	"Angry Dad: The Movie"
22	Maurice LaMarche	Anthony Hopkins	478–2214	NABF07	"Angry Dad: The Movie"
22	Nick Park	Himself	478–2214	NABF07	"Angry Dad: The Movie"
22	J. B. Smoove	DJ Kwanzaa	478–2214	NABF07	"Angry Dad: The Movie"
22	Werner Herzog	Walter Hotenhoffer	479–2215	NABF08	"The Scorpion's Tale"
22	Kevin Michael Richardson	Retirement Castle orderly	479–2215	NABF08	"The Scorpion's Tale"
22	Tommy Chong	Himself	480–2216	NABF09	"A Midsummer's Nice Dream"
22	Cheech Marin	Himself	480–2216	NABF09	"A Midsummer's Nice Dream"
22	Kareem Abdul-Jabbar	Himself	481–2217	NABF10	"Love Is a Many Strangled Thing"
22	Kevin Michael Richardson	Masseur	481–2217	NABF10	"Love Is a Many Strangled Thing"
22	Paul Rudd	Dr. Zander	481–2217	NABF10	"Love Is a Many Strangled Thing"
22	Marcia Wallace	Edna Krabappel	481–2217	NABF10	"Love Is a Many Strangled Thing"
22	David Copperfield	Himself	482–2218	NABF11	"The Great Simpsina"
22	Ricky Jay	Himself	482–2218	NABF11	"The Great Simpsina"
22	Penn Jillette	Himself	482–2218	NABF11	"The Great Simpsina"
22	Martin Landau	The Great Raymondo	482–2218	NABF11	"The Great Simpsina"
22	Jack McBrayer	Ewell Freestone	482–2218	NABF11	"The Great Simpsina"
22	Teller	Himself	482–2218	NABF11	"The Great Simpsina"
22	Joe Mantegna	Fat Tony	483–2219	NABF12	"The Real Housewives of Fat Tony"
22	Kristen Schaal (Note: Kristen Schaal was incorrectly credited as "Kristen Schall".)	Taffy	484–2220	NABF13	"Homer Scissorhands"
22	Marcia Wallace	Edna Krabappel	484–2220	NABF13	"Homer Scissorhands"
22	Albert Brooks	Hank Scorpio	485–2221	NABF14	"500 Keys"
22	Ken Burns	Himself	486–2222	NABF15	"The Ned-Liest Catch"
22	Joey Kramer (Note: Kramer had previously guest starred in "Flaming Moe's" as part of his band Aerosmith.)	Himself	486–2222	NABF15	"The Ned-Liest Catch"
22	Marcia Wallace	Edna Krabappel	486–2222	NABF15	"The Ned-Liest Catch"
23	Tom Colicchio	Himself	487–2301	NABF16	"The Falcon and the D'ohman"
23	Ping Marshall	Taiwanese Narrator	487–2301	NABF16	"The Falcon and the D'ohman"
23	Kevin Michael Richardson	SendEx Courier	487–2301	NABF16	"The Falcon and the D'ohman"
23	Kiefer Sutherland	Wayne Slater	487–2301	NABF16	"The Falcon and the D'ohman"
23	Marcia Wallace	Edna Krabappel	487–2301	NABF16	"The Falcon and the D'ohman"
23	Theodore Roosevelt (archival)	Himself	488–2302	NABF17	"Bart Stops to Smell the Roosevelts"
23	Marcia Wallace	Edna Krabappel	488–2302	NABF17	"Bart Stops to Smell the Roosevelts"
23	Jackie Mason	Rabbi Hyman Krustofsky	489–2303	NABF19	"Treehouse of Horror XXII"
23	Aron Ralston	911 operator	489–2303	NABF19	"Treehouse of Horror XXII"
23	Jane Lynch	Roz Davis	490–2304	NABF21	"Replaceable You"
23	Mario Batali	Himself	491–2305	NABF20	"The Food Wife"
23	Anthony Bourdain	Himself	491–2305	NABF20	"The Food Wife"
23	Tim Heidecker	Amus Bruse	491–2305	NABF20	"The Food Wife"
23	Gordon Ramsay	Himself	491–2305	NABF20	"The Food Wife"
23	Eric Wareheim	Fois Garth	491–2305	NABF20	"The Food Wife"
23	Neil Gaiman	Himself	492–2306	NABF22	"The Book Job"
23	Andy García	TweenLit Inc. Publisher	492–2306	NABF22	"The Book Job"
23	Kevin Michael Richardson	Party guest	493–2307	PABF01	"The Man in the Blue Flannel Pants"
23	John Slattery	Robert Marlowe	493–2307	PABF01	"The Man in the Blue Flannel Pants"
23	Matthew Weiner	Nuclear regulator	493–2307	PABF01	"The Man in the Blue Flannel Pants"
23	Kevin Dillon	Himself	494–2308	PABF02	"The Ten-Per-Cent Solution"
23	Janeane Garofalo	Herself	494–2308	PABF02	"The Ten-Per-Cent Solution"
23	Jackie Mason	Rabbi Hyman Krustofsky	494–2308	PABF02	"The Ten-Per-Cent Solution"
23	Joan Rivers	Annie Dubinsky	494–2308	PABF02	"The Ten-Per-Cent Solution"
23	Matt Groening	Announcer	494–2309	PABF02	"Holidays of Future Passed"
23	Dana Gould	Air marshall	496–2310	PABF03	"Politically Inept, with Homer Simpson"
23	Ted Nugent	Himself	496–2310	PABF03	"Politically Inept, with Homer Simpson"
23	Armie Hammer	Cameron Winklevoss; Tyler Winklevoss	497–2311	PABF04	"The D'oh-cial Network"
23	David Letterman	Himself	497–2311	PABF04	"The D'oh-cial Network"
23	Tiger Lillies	Play the end credits	497–2311	PABF04	"The D'oh-cial Network"
23	Jeremy Irons	Bar rag	498–2312	PABF05	"Moe Goes from Rags to Riches"
23	Michael Cera	Nick	499–2313	PABF06	"The Daughter Also Rises"
23	Jamie Hyneman	Himself	499–2313	PABF06	"The Daughter Also Rises"
23	Adam Savage	Himself	499–2313	PABF06	"The Daughter Also Rises"
23	Julian Assange	Himself	500–2314	PABF07	"At Long Last Leave"
23	Kelsey Grammer	Sideshow Bob	500–2314	PABF07	"At Long Last Leave"
23	Alison Krauss and Union Station	Perform the theme	500–2314	PABF07	"At Long Last Leave"
23	Susie Stevens	Sings "We'll Meet Again"	500–2314	PABF07	"At Long Last Leave"
23	Jackie Mason	Rabbi Hyman Krustofsky	500–2314	PABF07	"At Long Last Leave"
23	Robbie Conal	Himself	501–2315	PABF09	"Exit Through the Kwik-E-Mart"
23	Ron English	Himself	501–2315	PABF09	"Exit Through the Kwik-E-Mart"
23	Shepard Fairey	Himself	501–2315	PABF09	"Exit Through the Kwik-E-Mart"
23	Nicholas McKaig	Sings the end credits	501–2315	PABF09	"Exit Through the Kwik-E-Mart
23	Kenny Scharf	Himself	501–2315	PABF09	"Exit Through the Kwik-E-Mart"
23	David Byrne	Sings "Dream Operator"	502–2316	PABF08	"How I Wet Your Mother"
23	Glenn Close	Mona Simpson	502–2316	PABF08	"How I Wet Your Mother"
23	Brent Spiner	Robots	503–2317	PABF10	"Them, Robot"
23	Bill Plympton	Moviegoer	504–2318	PABF11	"Beware My Cheating Bart"
23	Kevin Michael Richardson	Security guard	504–2318	PABF11	"Beware My Cheating Bart"
23	Steve Coogan	Rowan Priddis	505–2319	PABF12	"A Totally Fun Thing That Bart Will Never Do Again"
23	Renee Ridgeley	Cruise Ship Receptionist	505–2319	PABF12	"A Totally Fun Thing That Bart Will Never Do Again"
23	Treat Williams	Himself	505–2319	PABF12	"A Totally Fun Thing That Bart Will Never Do Again"
23	Bryan Cranston	Stradivarius Cain	506–2320	PABF13	"The Spy Who Learned Me"
23	Eric Idle	Declan Desmond	506–2320	PABF13	"The Spy Who Learned Me"
23	Marcia Wallace	Edna Krabappel	506–2320	PABF13	"The Spy Who Learned Me"
23	Marcia Wallace	Edna Krabappel	507–2321	PABF15	"Ned 'n Edna's Blend Agenda"
23	Lady Gaga	Herself	508–2322	PABF14	"Lisa Goes Gaga"
23	Kevin Michael Richardson	Conductor	508–2322	PABF14	"Lisa Goes Gaga"
24	Ken Burns	Narrator	509–2401	PABF21	"Moonshine River"
24	Zooey Deschanel	Mary Spuckler	509–2401	PABF21	"Moonshine River"
24	Sarah Michelle Gellar	Gina Vendetti	509–2401	PABF21	"Moonshine River"
24	Anne Hathaway	Jenny	509–2401	PABF21	"Moonshine River"
24	Maurice LaMarche	Charlie Sheen	509–2401	PABF21	"Moonshine River"
24	Don Pardo	Himself	509–2401	PABF21	"Moonshine River"
24	Natalie Portman	Darcy	509–2401	PABF21	"Moonshine River"
24	Kevin Michael Richardson	Drummer	509–2401	PABF21	"Moonshine River"
24	Al Roker	Himself	509–2401	PABF21	"Moonshine River"
24	Sarah Silverman	Nikki McKenna	509–2401	PABF21	"Moonshine River"
24	Marcia Wallace	Edna Krabappel	509–2401	PABF21	"Moonshine River"
24	Jon Lovitz	Artie Ziff	510–2402	PABF17	"Treehouse of Horror XXIII"
24	Marcia Wallace	Edna Krabappel	510–2402	PABF17	"Treehouse of Horror XXIII"
24	Jeff Gordon	Himself	511–2403	PABF18	"Adventures in Baby-Getting"
24	Marvin Hamlisch	Himself	512–2404	PABF15	"Gone Abie Gone"
24	Anika Noni Rose	Rita LaFleur	512–2404	PABF15	"Gone Abie Gone"
24	Jennifer Tilly	Herself	512–2404	PABF15	"Gone Abie Gone"
24	Steve Carell	Dan Gillick	513–2405	PABF19	"Penny-Wiseguys"
24	Terry W. Greene	Giant Ant	513–2405	PABF19	"Penny-Wiseguys"
24	Joe Mantegna	Fat Tony	513–2405	PABF19	"Penny-Wiseguys"
24	Alex Trebek	Himself	513–2405	PABF19	"Penny-Wiseguys"
24	Kelsey Grammer	Sideshow Bob	514–2406	PABF22	"A Tree Grows in Springfield"
24	Marcia Wallace	Edna Krabappel	514–2406	PABF22	"A Tree Grows in Springfield"
24	Fred Armisen	Terrence	515–2407	PABF20	"The Day the Earth Stood Cool"
24	Carrie Brownstein	Emily	515–2407	PABF20	"The Day the Earth Stood Cool"
24	Colin Meloy (Note: While the entirety of the band The Decemberists were animated playing music in the episode, only Meloy had any individual lines and was credited.)	Himself	515–2407	PABF20	"The Day the Earth Stood Cool"
24	Patton Oswalt	T-Rex	515–2407	PABF20	"The Day the Earth Stood Cool"
24	Marcia Wallace	Edna Krabappel	515–2407	PABF20	"The Day the Earth Stood Cool"
24	Maurice LaMarche	Prepper	517–2409	RABF02	"Homer Goes to Prep School"
24	Tom Waits	Lloyd	517–2409	RABF02	"Homer Goes to Prep School"
24	Valerie Harper	Proctor Jennifer Clarkeson	518–2410	RABF03	"A Test Before Trying"
24	Marcia Wallace	Edna Krabappel	518–2410	RABF03	"A Test Before Trying"
24	Danny DeVito	Herbert Powell	519–2411	RABF04	"The Changing of the Guardian"
24	Terry W. Greene	Man Baby	519–2411	RABF04	"The Changing of the Guardian"
24	Rashida Jones	Portia	519–2411	RABF04	"The Changing of the Guardian"
24	Robert A. Caro	Himself	520–2412	RABF07	"Love is a Many-Splintered Thing"
24	Benedict Cumberbatch	Prime Minister; Alan Rickman	520–2412	RABF07	"Love is a Many-Splintered Thing"
24	Zooey Deschanel	Mary Spuckler	520–2412	RABF07	"Love is a Many-Splintered Thing"
24	Max Weinberg	Himself	520–2412	RABF07	"Love is a Many-Splintered Thing"
24	Kevin Michael Richardson	Book Store Security Guard	521–2413	RABF05	"Hardly Kirk-ing"
24	Richard Dawkins	Himself	523–2415	RABF09	"Black Eyed, Please"
24	Tina Fey	Ms. Cantwell	523–2415	RABF09	"Black Eyed, Please"
24	Marcia Wallace	Edna Krabappel	523–2415	RABF09	"Black Eyed, Please"
24	Michael Dees	Sings "Easter Parade"	524–2416	RABF10	"Dark Knight Court"
24	Janet Reno	Herself	524–2416	RABF10	"Dark Knight Court"
24	Maggy Reno Hurchalla (Note: Because her sister Janet was suffering from Parkinson's disease and had trouble delivering some of the longer lines, Maggy substituted for her when needed.)	Janet Reno	524–2416	RABF10	"Dark Knight Court"
24	Bryan Cranston	Walter White (live action)	525–2417	RABF08	"What Animated Women Want"
24	Maurice LaMarche	Chef Naziwa; Karl Malden	525–2417	RABF08	"What Animated Women Want"
24	Aaron Paul	Jesse Pinkman (live action)	525–2417	RABF08	"What Animated Women Want"
24	Wanda Sykes	School therapist	525–2417	RABF08	"What Animated Women Want"
24	George Takei	Akira	525–2417	RABF08	"What Animated Women Want"
24	Marcia Wallace	Edna Krabappel	525–2417	RABF08	"What Animated Women Want"
24	Edward Norton	Rev. Elijah Hooper	526–2418	RABF11	"Pulpit Friction"
24	Susie Stevens	Sings "Day By Day"	526–2418	RABF11	"Pulpit Friction"
24	Tony Bennett	Sings "Capital City"	527–2419	RABF13	"Whiskey Business"
24	Kevin Michael Richardson	Police officer	527–2419	RABF13	"Whiskey Business"
24	Sonny Rollins	Himself	527–2419	RABF13	"Whiskey Business"
24	Ron Taylor	Bleeding Gums Murphy	527–2419	RABF13	"Whiskey Business"
24	Justin Bieber	Himself	528–2420	RABF12	"The Fabulous Faker Boy"
24	Bill Hader	Slava	528–2420	RABF12	"The Fabulous Faker Boy"
24	Jane Krakowski	Zhenya	528–2420	RABF12	"The Fabulous Faker Boy"
24	Patrick Stewart	Power plant employee	528–2420	RABF12	"The Fabulous Faker Boy"
24	Sigur Rós	Themselves	529–2421	RABF14	"The Saga of Carl"
24	Lisa Lampanelli	Ramona	530–2422	RABF17	"Dangers on a Train"
24	Seth MacFarlane	Ben	530–2422	RABF17	"Dangers on a Train"
25	Kevin Michael Richardson	FBI agent	531–2501	RABF20	"Homerland"
25	Kristen Wiig	Annie Crawford	531–2501	RABF20	"Homerland"
25	Marcia Wallace	Edna Krabappel	532–2502	RABF16	"Treehouse of Horror XXIV"
25	Rachel Maddow	Herself	533–2503	RABF18	"Four Regrettings and a Funeral"
25	Joe Namath	Himself	533–2503	RABF18	"Four Regrettings and a Funeral"
25	Marcia Wallace	Edna Krabappel	533–2503	RABF18	"Four Regrettings and a Funeral"
25	Denise Donatelli	Sings "You Only Live Once" (parody of the song You Only Live Twice)	534–2504	RABF22	"YOLO"
25	Jon Lovitz	Llewellyn Sinclair	534–2504	RABF22	"YOLO"
25	Marcia Wallace	Edna Krabappel	534–2504	RABF22	"YOLO"
25	Elisabeth Moss	Gretchen	534–2504	RABF19	"Labor Pains"
25	Anderson Cooper	Himself	536–2506	SABF02	"The Kid Is All Right"
25	Maurice LaMarche	John Kerry	536–2506	SABF02	"The Kid Is All Right"
25	Eva Longoria	Isabel Gutierrez	536–2506	SABF02	"The Kid Is All Right"
25	Kevin Michael Richardson	Jamaican Krusty	537–2507	SABF04	"Yellow Subterfuge"
25	Judd Apatow	Himself	539–2509	SABF05	"Steal This Episode"
25	Will Arnett	Deputy Director Gratman	539–2509	SABF05	"Steal This Episode"
25	Rob Halford	Himself	539–2509	SABF05	"Steal This Episode"
25	Leslie Mann	Herself	539–2509	SABF05	"Steal This Episode"
25	Kevin Michael Richardson	Inmate; Hollywood Bigshot	539–2509	SABF05	"Steal This Episode"
25	Seth Rogen	Himself	539–2509	SABF05	"Steal This Episode"
25	Paul Rudd	Himself	539–2509	SABF05	"Steal This Episode"
25	Channing Tatum	Himself playing Homer Simpson	539–2509	SABF05	"Steal This Episode"
25	Harlan Ellison	Himself	540–2510	SABF03	"Married to the Blob"
25	Maurice LaMarche	Milo	540–2510	SABF03	"Married to the Blob"
25	Stan Lee	Himself	540–2510	SABF03	"Married to the Blob"
25	Maurice LaMarche	Football Commentator	541–2511	SABF06	"Specs and the City"
25	Will Lyman	Himself	541–2511	SABF06	"Specs and the City"
25	Daniel Radcliffe	Diggs	542–2512	SABF08	"Diggs"
25	Kelsey Grammer	Sideshow Bob	543–2513	SABF07	"The Man Who Grew Too Much"
25	Marcia Wallace	Edna Krabappel	543–2513	SABF07	"The Man Who Grew Too Much"
25	Kevin Michael Richardson	Hibbert's Father; S.A.T. Preppers Member	544–2514	SABF09	"The Winter of His Content"
25	Renee Ridgeley	Waitress	545–2515	SABF10	"The War of Art"
25	Max von Sydow	Klaus Ziegler	545–2515	SABF10	"The War of Art"
25	Andrés Cantor	Himself	546–2516	SABF11	"You Don't Have to Live Like a Referee"
25	Joey Vieira	Soccer Player	546–2516	SABF11	"You Don't Have to Live Like a Referee"
25	Zach Galifianakis	Lucas Bortner	547–2517	SABF12	"Luca$"
25	Amy Poehler	Jenda	548–2518	SABF13	"Days of Future Future"
25	Tavi Gevinson	Jenny	549–2519	SABF14	"What to Expect When Bart's Expecting"
25	Joe Mantegna	Fat Tony	549–2519	SABF14	"What to Expect When Bart's Expecting"
25	Carl Kasell	Himself	551–2521	SABF15	"Pay Pal"
25	John Oliver	Booth Wilkes-John	551–2521	SABF15	"Pay Pal"
25	Peter Sagal	Himself	551–2521	SABF15	"Pay Pal"
25	Glenn Close	Mona Simpson	552–2522	SABF18	"The Yellow Badge of Cowardge"
25	Edwin Moses	Himself	552–2522	SABF18	"The Yellow Badge of Cowardge"
26	Kelsey Grammer	Sideshow Bob	553–2601	SABF20	"Clown in the Dumps"
26	Don Hertzfeldt	Couch gag Simpsons	553–2601	SABF20	"Clown in the Dumps"
26	Maurice LaMarche	Clive Meriwether; Neil Simon; Rodney Dangerfield	553–2601	SABF20	"Clown in the Dumps"
26	Jackie Mason	Rabbi Hyman Krustofsky	553–2601	SABF20	"Clown in the Dumps"
26	David Hyde Pierce	Himself	553–2601	SABF20	"Clown in the Dumps"
26	Jeff Ross	Himself	553–2601	SABF20	"Clown in the Dumps"
26	Sarah Silverman	Herself	553–2601	SABF20	"Clown in the Dumps"
26	Nick Offerman	Captain Joseph "Joe" Bowditch	554–2602	SABF17	"The Wreck of the Relationship"
26	Marc Wilmore	Narrator	554–2602	SABF17	"The Wreck of the Relationship"
26	John Ratzenberger	CGI Homer Simpson	556–2604	SABF21	"Treehouse of Horror XXV"
26	Jane Fonda	Maxine Lombard	557–2605	SABF22	"Opposites A-Frack"
26	Robert Siegel	Himself	557–2605	SABF22	"Opposites A-Frack"
26	John DiMaggio	Bender	558–2606	SABF16	"Simpsorama"
26	David Herman	Scruffy	558–2606	SABF16	"Simpsorama"
26	Maurice LaMarche	Morbo; Hedonismbot; Lrrr	558–2606	SABF16	"Simpsorama"
26	Phil LaMarr	Hermes Conrad	558–2606	SABF16	"Simpsorama"
26	Katey Sagal	Turanga Leela	558–2606	SABF16	"Simpsorama"
26	Sally Stevens	Sings "I Will Wait For You" and "A Natural Woman"	558–2606	SABF16	"Simpsorama"
26	Lauren Tom	Amy Wong	558–2606	SABF16	"Simpsorama"
26	Frank Welker	Nibbler	558–2606	SABF16	"Simpsorama"
26	Billy West	Philip J. Fry; Professor Farnsworth; Dr. Zoidberg	558–2606	SABF16	"Simpsorama"
26	Willem Dafoe	Jack Lassen	559–2607	TABF01	"Blazed and Confused"
26	Kelsey Grammer	Sideshow Bob	559–2607	TABF01	"Blazed and Confused"
26	David Silverman	Himself	559–2607	TABF01	"Blazed and Confused"
26	Will Forte	King Toot	560–2608	TABF02	"Covercraft"
26	Sammy Hagar	Himself	560–2608	TABF02	"Covercraft"
26	Heavy Young Heathens (Note: Consisting of Aron Michael Manderosian and Robert J. Manderosian.)	Performing "Hopin' for a Dream"	560–2608	TABF02	"Covercraft"
26	Matthew Sweet	Nick Delacourt	560–2608	TABF02	"Covercraft"
26	Gene Lockhart (archival)	Henry X. Harper	561–2609	TABF03	"I Won't Be Home for Christmas"
26	Stacy Keach	Don Bookner	563–2611	TABF05	"Bart's New Friend"
26	Elon Musk	Himself	564–2612	TABF04	"The Musk Who Fell To Earth"
26	Kevin Michael Richardson	Albert	565–2613	TABF06	"Walking Big & Tall"
26	Pharrell Williams	Himself	565–2613	TABF06	"Walking Big & Tall"
26	Christopher Lloyd	Jim Ignatowski	566–2614	TABF07	"My Fare Lady"
26	Rich Sommer	Young Man	566–2614	TABF07	"My Fare Lady"
26	Richard Branson	Himself	567–2615	TABF08	"The Princess Guide"
26	Yaya DaCosta	Princess Kemi	567–2615	TABF08	"The Princess Guide"
26	Jon Lovitz	Enrico Irritazio	567–2615	TABF08	"The Princess Guide"
26	Kevin Michael Richardson	The Nigerian King	567–2615	TABF08	"The Princess Guide"
26	Nathan Fielder	Doug Blattner	568–2616	TABF09	"Sky Police"
26	Cat Deeley	Herself	569–2617	TABF10	"Waiting for Duffman"
26	R. Lee Ermey	Colonel Leslie Hapablap	569–2617	TABF10	"Waiting for Duffman"
26	Stacy Keach	Howard K. Duff VIII	569–2617	TABF10	"Waiting for Duffman"
26	Glenn Close	Mona Simpson	572–2620	TABF13	"Let's Go Fly a Coot"
26	Carice van Houten	Annika Van Houten	572–2620	TABF13	"Let's Go Fly a Coot"
26	Albert Brooks	Dr. Raufbold	573–2621	TABF15	"Bull-E"
26	Joe Mantegna	Fat Tony	573–2621	TABF15	"Bull-E"
26	Johnny Mathis	Himself	573–2621	TABF15	"Bull-E"
26	Justin Roiland	Rick Sanchez; Morty Smith; Cloning Alien	574–2622	TABF16	"Mathlete's Feat"
27	Adam Driver	Adam Sackler	575–2701	TABF14	"Every Man's Dream"
27	Lena Dunham	Candace; Hannah Helene Horvath	575–2701	TABF14	"Every Man's Dream"
27	Laura Ingraham	Dr. Zilowitz	575–2701	TABF14	"Every Man's Dream"
27	Jemima Kirke	Candace's Friend #3	575–2701	TABF14	"Every Man's Dream"
27	Zosia Mamet	Candace's Friend #2	575–2701	TABF14	"Every Man's Dream"
27	Allison Williams	Candace's Friend #1	575–2701	TABF14	"Every Man's Dream"
27	Alton Brown	Himself	576–2702	TABF17	"'Cue Detective"
27	Rex Harrison (archival)	Doctor John Dolittle	576–2702	TABF17	"'Cue Detective"
27	Bobby Moynihan	Tyler Boom	576–2702	TABF17	"'Cue Detective"
27	Anthony Newley (archival)	Matthew Mugg	576–2702	TABF17	"'Cue Detective"
27	Edward James Olmos	Pit Master	576–2702	TABF17	"'Cue Detective"
27	Ben Schwartz	Clerk	576–2702	TABF17	"'Cue Detective"
27	Jon Lovitz	Cigarette	577–2703	TABF19	"Puffless"
27	Yo-Yo Ma	Himself	577–2703	TABF19	"Puffless"
27	Blake Anderson	Dickie	578–2704	TABF22	"Halloween of Horror"
27	Nick Kroll	Lem	578–2704	TABF22	"Halloween of Horror"
27	Renee Ridgeley	Krustyland Security Guard	578–2704	TABF22	"Halloween of Horror"
27	Kelsey Grammer	Sideshow Bob	579–2705	TABF18	"Treehouse of Horror XXVI"
27	Chris Wedge	Scrat	579–2705	TABF18	"Treehouse of Horror XXVI"
27	Kristen Bell	Harper Jambowski	580–2706	TABF21	"Friend With Benefit"
27	David Copperfield	Himself	580–2706	TABF21	"Friend With Benefit"
27	Stephen Merchant	CONRAD	584–2710	VABF03	"The Girl Code"
27	Kaitlin Olson	Quinn Hopper	584–2710	VABF03	"The Girl Code"
27	Sofía Vergara	Ms. Carol Berrera	585–2711	VABF04	"Teenage Mutant Milk-Caused Hurdles"
27	Utkarsh Ambudkar	Jamshed "Jay" Nahasapeemapetilon	586–2712	VABF05	"Much Apu About Something"
27	Glenn Close	Mona Simpson	587–2713	VABF07	"Love Is in the N2-O2-Ar-CO2-Ne-He-CH4"
27	Bob Boilen	Himself	588–2714	VABF06	"Gal of Constant Sorrow"
27	Kelsey Grammer	Sideshow Bob	588–2714	VABF06	"Gal of Constant Sorrow"
27	Kate McKinnon	Hettie Mae Boggs	588–2714	VABF06	"Gal of Constant Sorrow"
27	Natalie Maines (Note: Maines had previously guest starred in "Papa Don't Leech" as part of her band The Dixie Chicks.)	Hettie Mae Boggs' singing voice	588–2714	VABF06	"Gal of Constant Sorrow"
27	Michael York	Dr. Lionel Budgie	589–2715	VABF08	"Lisa the Veterinarian"
27	Brian J. Kaufman	Exploration Incorporated Candidate	590–2716	VABF09	"The Marge-ian Chronicles"
27	Tom Scharpling	Paul	590–2716	VABF09	"The Marge-ian Chronicles"
27	Jon Wurster	Barry	590–2716	VABF09	"The Marge-ian Chronicles"
27	George Takei	Himself	591–2717	VABF10	"The Burns Cage"
27	Andrew Rannells	Himself	592–2718	VABF11	"How Lisa Got Her Marge Back"
27	Jay Leno	Himself	594–2720	VABF14	"To Courier with Love"
27	Kevin Michael Richardson (Note: Richardson's last appearance as a guest star before joining the supporting cast the following season.)	Prison Guard	596–2722	VABF15	"Orange Is the New Yellow"
28	Amy Schumer	Daphne Burns	597–2801	VABF20	"Monty Burns' Fleeing Circus"
28	Pendleton Ward	Sings "Simpsons Time" (parody of Adventure Time theme song)	597–2801	VABF20	"Monty Burns' Fleeing Circus"
28	Allison Janney	Julia	598–2802	VABF18	"Friends and Family"
28	Bill Burr	Boston Football Fan #3; Man in Tunnel; Cart-Warning Man	599–2803	VABF17	"The Town"
28	Michael Chiklis	Handsome Quarterback	599–2803	VABF17	"The Town"
28	Rachel Dratch	Bostonian Doctor	599–2803	VABF17	"The Town"
28	Doris Kearns Goodwin	Herself	599–2803	VABF17	"The Town"
28	Dana Gould	Murphy	599–2803	VABF17	"The Town"
28	Mike Mitchell	Jay	599–2803	VABF17	"The Town"
28	Jason Nash	Southie Criminals; Southie Philanthropists	599–2803	VABF17	"The Town"
28	Drew Carey	Himself	600–2804	VABF16	"Treehouse of Horror XXVII"
28	Donald Fagen	Himself	600–2804	VABF16	"Treehouse of Horror XXVII"
28	Kelsey Grammer	Sideshow Bob	600–2804	VABF16	"Treehouse of Horror XXVII"
28	Maurice LaMarche	Hedonismbot	600–2804	VABF16	"Treehouse of Horror XXVII"
28	Judith Owen	Sings "600" (parody of the song Goldfinger)	600–2804	VABF16	"Treehouse of Horror XXVII"
28	Sarah Silverman	Rachel Cohen	600–2804	VABF16	"Treehouse of Horror XXVII"
28	Dan Rather	Himself	601–2805	VABF21	"Trust But Clarify"
28	Stacy Keach	Howard K. Duff VIII	603–2807	VABF19	"Havana Wild Weekend"
28	Deb Lacusta	Isabella	603–2807	VABF19	"Havana Wild Weekend"
28	Matt Leinart	Himself	604–2808	WABF01	"Dad Behavior"
28	Wayne Gretzky	Himself	606–2810	WABF02	"The Nightmare After Krustmas"
28	Theo Jansen	Himself	606–2810	WABF02	"The Nightmare After Krustmas"
28	Natasha Lyonne	Sophie Krustofsky	606–2810	WABF02	"The Nightmare After Krustmas"
28	Jackie Mason	Rabbi Hyman Krustofsky	606–2810	WABF02	"The Nightmare After Krustmas"
28	Joyce Carol Oates	Herself	607–2811	WABF06	"Pork and Burns"
28	Michael York	Dr. Lionel Budgie	607–2811	WABF06	"Pork and Burns"
28	Charles Barkley	Himself	608–2812	WABF04	"The Great Phatsby: Part One"
28	Phil LaMarr	Auctioneer; Informed Party Guest	608–2812	WABF04	"The Great Phatsby: Part One"
28	Jim Beanz	Performing End-Titles music	608–2812; 609–2813	WABF04; WABF05	"The Great Phatsby: Part One" "The Great Phatsby: Part Two"
28	V. Bozeman	Additional vocals	608–2812; 609–2813	WABF04; WABF05	"The Great Phatsby: Part One" "The Great Phatsby: Part Two"
28	Charlean Carmon	Additional vocals	608–2812; 609–2813	WABF04; WABF05	"The Great Phatsby: Part One" "The Great Phatsby: Part Two"
28	Keegan-Michael Key	Jazzy James	608–2812; 609–2813	WABF04; WABF05	"The Great Phatsby: Part One" "The Great Phatsby: Part Two"
28	Sally Stevens	Additional vocals	608–2812; 609–2813	WABF04; WABF05	"The Great Phatsby: Part One" "The Great Phatsby: Part Two"
28	Destiny Torres	"CEO of Obsidian" Female Vocalist; Additional vocals	608–2812; 609–2813	WABF04; WABF05	"The Great Phatsby: Part One" "The Great Phatsby: Part Two"
28	Common	Himself	609–2813	WABF05	"The Great Phatsby: Part Two"
28	Snoop Dogg	Himself	609–2813	WABF05	"The Great Phatsby: Part Two"
28	Taraji P. Henson	Praline	609–2813	WABF05	"The Great Phatsby: Part Two"
28	RZA	Himself	609–2813	WABF05	"The Great Phatsby: Part Two"
28	Glenn Close	Mona Simpson	610–2814	WABF07	"Fatzcarraldo"
28	Magnus Carlsen	Himself	611–2815	WABF08	"The Cad and the Hat"
28	Seth Green	Robot Chicken Nerd	611–2815	WABF08	"The Cad and the Hat"
28	Patton Oswalt	Bart's Guilt	611–2815	WABF08	"The Cad and the Hat"
28	Lizzy Caplan	Virginia Johnson	612–2816	WABF09	"Kamp Krustier"
28	Michael Sheen	William Masters	612–2816	WABF09	"Kamp Krustier"
28	Stephen Curry	Himself	613–2817	WABF10	"22 for 30"
28	Earl Mann	Narrator (Eddie Muntz)	613–2817	WABF10	"22 for 30"
28	Joe Mantegna	Fat Tony	613–2817	WABF10	"22 for 30"
28	Vanessa Bayer	Dr. Clarity Hoffman-Roth	614–2818	WABF11	"A Father's Watch"
28	Brian Posehn	Dumlee	614–2818	WABF11	"A Father's Watch"
28	Rob Riggle	Dr. Fenton Pooltoy	614–2818	WABF11	"A Father's Watch"
28	Adam Silver	Himself	614–2818	WABF11	"A Father's Watch"
28	Jason Alexander	Bourbon Verlander	615–2819	WABF12	"The Caper Chase"
28	Ken Jennings	Himself	615–2819	WABF12	"The Caper Chase"
28	Stan Lee	Himself	615–2819	WABF12	"The Caper Chase"
28	Robert McKee	Himself	615–2819	WABF12	"The Caper Chase"
28	Suze Orman	Herself	615–2819	WABF12	"The Caper Chase"
28	Neil deGrasse Tyson	Himself	615–2819	WABF12	"The Caper Chase"
28	Valerie Harper	Ma-Ma	616–2820	WABF13	"Looking for Mr. Goodbart"
28	Kipp Lennon	Sings "Small Bang Hypothesis" (parody of The Big Bang Theory theme song)	616–2820	WABF13	"Looking for Mr. Goodbart"
28	Jennifer Saunders	Phoebe Pratt	616–2820	WABF13	"Looking for Mr. Goodbart"
28	Valerie Harper	Mrs. Butterworth	617–2821	WABF14	"Moho House"
28	Michael York	Nigel	617–2821	WABF14	"Moho House"
28	Michael York	Dr. Lionel Budgie	618–2822	WABF15	"Dogtown"
29	Billy Boyd	Sings "The Perfect Tale" (parody of the song The Last Goodbye)	619–2901	WABF17	"The Serfsons"
29	Nikolaj Coster-Waldau	Markery	619–2901	WABF17	"The Serfsons"
29	Alison Bechdel	Herself	620–2902	WABF22	"Springfield Splendor"
29	Rachel Bloom	Annette	620–2902	WABF22	"Springfield Splendor"
29	Roz Chast	Herself	620–2902	WABF22	"Springfield Splendor"
29	Dan Harmon	Himself	620–2902	WABF22	"Springfield Splendor"
29	Kipp Lennon	Sings "Collaboration" (parody of the song Infatuation)	620–2902	WABF22	"Springfield Splendor"
29	Marjane Satrapi	Herself	620–2902	WABF22	"Springfield Splendor"
29	Martin Short	Guthrie Frenel	620–2902	WABF22	"Springfield Splendor"
29	Nick Fascitelli	Whistler	621–2903	WABF16	"Whistler's Father"
29	Valerie Harper	Backstage Mother #2	621–2903	WABF16	"Whistler's Father"
29	Joe Mantegna	Fat Tony	621–2903	WABF16	"Whistler's Father"
29	Mario Batali	Himself	622–2904	WABF18	"Treehouse of Horror XXVIII"
29	Ben Daniels	Irish Priest	622–2904	WABF18	"Treehouse of Horror XXVIII"
29	William Friedkin	Dr. Kenneth Humphries	622–2904	WABF18	"Treehouse of Horror XXVIII"
29	Neil Gaiman	Snowball II	622–2904	WABF18	"Treehouse of Horror XXVIII"
29	Carolyn Omine	Focus Group Woman	624–2906	WABF20	"The Old Blue Mayor She Ain't What She Used to Be"
29	Kat Dennings	Valerie	626–2908	XABF01	"Mr. Lisa's Opus"
29	Valerie Harper	Ms. Myles	626–2908	XABF01	"Mr. Lisa's Opus"
29	Norman Lear	Himself	626–2908	XABF01	"Mr. Lisa's Opus"
29	Kipp Lennon	Leon Kompowsky	626–2908	XABF01	"Mr. Lisa's Opus"
29	Jon Lovitz	Artie Ziff	626–2908	XABF01	"Mr. Lisa's Opus"
29	Kelsey Grammer	Sideshow Bob	627–2909	XABF02	"Gone Boy"
29	Valerie Harper	Nurse	627–2909	XABF02	"Gone Boy"
29	John F. Kennedy (archival)	Himself	627–2909	XABF02	"Gone Boy"
29	Shaquille O'Neal	Himself	627–2909	XABF02	"Gone Boy"
29	Ed Sheeran	Brendan Beiderbecke	628–2910	XABF03	"Haw-Haw Land"
29	Valerie Harper	Proctor Jennifer Clarkeson	629–2911	XABF04	"Frink Gets Testy"
29	Maurice LaMarche	Orson Welles	629–2911	XABF04	"Frink Gets Testy"
29	Bill Hader	Manacek	630–2912	XABF05	"Homer Is Where the Art Isn't"
29	Cecily Strong	Megan Matheson	630–2912	XABF05	"Homer Is Where the Art Isn't"
29	John Baldessari	Himself	631–2913	XABF06	"3 Scenes Plus a Tag from a Marriage"
29	Kevin Pollak	Ross; Bagel Man; Professor Thernstrom	631–2913	XABF06	"3 Scenes Plus a Tag from a Marriage"
29	J. K. Simmons	J.J. Gruff	631–2913	XABF06	"3 Scenes Plus a Tag from a Marriage"
29	Andy Daly	Judge Dowd	632–2914	XABF08	"Fears of a Clown"
29	Damian Kulash (Note: While the entirety of the band OK Go were animated playing music in the episode, only Kulash and Nordwind had any individual lines and were credited.)	Himself	632–2914	XABF08	"Fears of a Clown"
29	Jon Lovitz	Llewellyn Sinclair	632–2914	XABF08	"Fears of a Clown"
29	Jackie Mason	Rabbi Hyman Krustofsky	632–2914	XABF08	"Fears of a Clown"
29	Tim Nordwind (Note: While the entirety of the band OK Go were animated playing music in the episode, only Kulash and Nordwind had any individual lines and were credited.)	Himself	632–2914	XABF08	"Fears of a Clown"
29	Daniel Radcliffe	Himself	633–2915	XABF07	"No Good Read Goes Unpunished"
29	Jimmy O. Yang	Sun Tzu	633–2915	XABF07	"No Good Read Goes Unpunished"
29	Ray Liotta	Morty Szyslak	634–2916	XABF10	"King Leer"
29	Debi Mazar	Minnie Szyslak	634–2916	XABF10	"King Leer"
29	Jonathan Schmock	Johnny Bermuda Salesman	634–2916	XABF10	"King Leer"
29	Trombone Shorty	Himself	635–2917	XABF11	"Lisa Gets the Blues"
29	Glenn Close	Mona Simpson	636–2918	XABF09	"Forgive and Regret"
29	Caitlin Parrott	Sings "Four-Legged Angel"	636–2918	XABF09	"Forgive and Regret"
29	Michael Dees	Sings "My Funny Valentine"	637–2919	XABF12	"Left Behind"
29	Marcia Wallace (Note: Wallace's appearance consisted of one line of archival audio from the episode "Bart Gets a "Z"", Marcia Wallace having passed away in 2013.)	Edna Krabappel	637–2919	XABF12	"Left Behind"
29	Sidse Babett Knudsen	Danish Bar Woman	638–2920	XABF13	"Throw Grampa from the Dane"
29	Jackie Mason	Rabbi Hyman Krustofsky	639–2921	XABF14	"Flanders' Ladder"
30	Dave Attell	Luke	640–3001	XABF19	"Bart's Not Dead"
30	Emily Deschanel	Herself / Herself playing Marge Simpson	640–3001	XABF19	"Bart's Not Dead"
30	Gal Gadot	Herself / Herself playing Lisa Simpson	640–3001	XABF19	"Bart's Not Dead"
30	Jonathan Groff	Actor playing Bart Simpson	640–3001	XABF19	"Bart's Not Dead"
30	Pete Holmes	Matthew	640–3001	XABF19	"Bart's Not Dead"
30	Joe Clabby	Curtis	641–3002	XABF15	"Heartbreak Hotel"
30	Rhys Darby	Tag Tuckerbag	641–3002	XABF15	"Heartbreak Hotel"
30	Renee Ridgeley	Honey	641–3002	XABF15	"Heartbreak Hotel"
30	George Segal	Nick	641–3002	XABF15	"Heartbreak Hotel
30	H. Jon Benjamin	Bob Belcher	642–3003	XABF17	"My Way or the Highway to Heaven"
30	Jon Lovitz	Himself	642–3003	XABF17	"My Way or the Highway to Heaven"
30	Dan Mintz	Tina Belcher	642–3003	XABF17	"My Way or the Highway to Heaven"
30	Eugene Mirman	Gene Belcher	642–3003	XABF17	"My Way or the Highway to Heaven"
30	Ted Moock	Sings "Cheek to Cheek"	642–3003	XABF17	"My Way or the Highway to Heaven"
30	Tracy Morgan	Himself	642–3003	XABF17	"My Way or the Highway to Heaven"
30	John Roberts	Linda Belcher	642–3003	XABF17	"My Way or the Highway to Heaven"
30	Kristen Schaal	Louise Belcher	642–3003	XABF17	"My Way or the Highway to Heaven"
30	Tracy Morgan	Tow Truck Driver	644–3005	XABF18	"Baby You Can't Drive My Car"
30	Jon Lovitz	Hacky; Snitchy the Weasel	645–3006	XABF20	"From Russia Without Love"
30	Ksenia Solo	Anastasia Alekova	645–3006	XABF20	"From Russia Without Love"
30	Raja / Sutan Amrull	Himself	646–3007	XABF21	"Werking Mom"
30	RuPaul	Queen Chante	646–3007	XABF21	"Werking Mom"
30	Scott Thompson	Grady	646–3007	XABF21	"Werking Mom"
30	Billy Eichner	Billy	647–3008	XABF22	"Krusty the Clown"
30	Peter Serafinowicz	Google-Disney CEO	647–3008	XABF22	"Krusty the Clown"
30	Phillip Alford (archival)	Jeremy Atticus "Jem" Finch	648–3009	YABF01	"Daddicus Finch"
30	Mary Badham (archival)	Jean Louise "Scout" Finch	648–3009	YABF01	"Daddicus Finch"
30	Jon Lovitz	Llewellyn Sinclair; Rabbi	648–3009	YABF01	"Daddicus Finch"
30	John Megna (archival)	Charles "Dill" Baker Harris	648–3009	YABF01	"Daddicus Finch"
30	Gregory Peck (archival)	Atticus Finch	648–3009	YABF01	"Daddicus Finch"
30	J. K. Simmons	Dr. Jessup	648–3009	YABF01	"Daddicus Finch"
30	Jane Lynch	Jeanie	649–3010	YABF02	"'Tis the 30th Season"
30	Bryan Batt	Philip Hefflin	650–3011	YABF03	"Mad About the Toy"
30	Bill de Blasio	Himself	650–3011	YABF03	"Mad About the Toy"
30	Lawrence O'Donnell	Himself	650–3011	YABF03	"Mad About the Toy"
30	Terry Gross	Herself	651–3012	YABF04	"The Girl on the Bus"
30	Patti LuPone	Cheryl Monroe	651–3012	YABF04	"The Girl on the Bus"
30	Ted Sarandos	Himself	652–3013	YABF06	"I'm Dancing as Fat as I Can"
30	Marc Maron	Himself	653–3014	YABF05	"The Clown Stays in the Picture"
30	Guillermo del Toro	Himself	654–3015	YABF07	"101 Mitigations"
30	Wallace Shawn	Wallace the Hernia	655–3016	YABF08	"I Want You (She's So Heavy)"
30	Ken Jeong	Korean Monk #1; Korean Monk #2	656–3017	YABF09	"E My Sports"
30	Natasha Lyonne	Sophie Krustofsky	656–3017	YABF09	"E My Sports"
30	David Turley	"Conflict of Enemies" Commentator	656–3017	YABF09	"E My Sports"
30	Awkwafina	Carmen	657–3018	YABF10	"Bart vs. Itchy & Scratchy"
30	Nicole Byer	Erica	657–3018	YABF10	"Bart vs. Itchy & Scratchy"
30	Chelsea Peretti	Piper	657–3018	YABF10	"Bart vs. Itchy & Scratchy"
30	Dave Matthews	Lloyd the Bartender	658–3019	YABF11	"Girl's in the Band"
30	J. K. Simmons	Victor Kleskow	658–3019	YABF11	"Girl's in the Band"
30	Josh Groban	Professor John Frink's singing voice	659–3020	YABF12	"I'm Just a Girl Who Can't Say D'oh"
30	John Lithgow	Himself	659–3020	YABF12	"I'm Just a Girl Who Can't Say D'oh"
30	Jon Lovitz	Llewellyn Sinclair	659–3020	YABF12	"I'm Just a Girl Who Can't Say D'oh"
30	Okilly Dokilly (Note: Consisting of Head Ned, Red Ned, Stead Ned, Thread Ned and Bled Ned. While airing in April 2019, the music video used was from 2016 and thus featured former band members rather than the current lineup at the time.)	Themselves performing "White Wine Spritzer"	659–3020	YABF12	"I'm Just a Girl Who Can't Say D'oh"
30	Awkwafina	Dr. Chang	660–3021	YABF14	"D'oh Canada"
30	Judy Blume	Herself	660–3021	YABF14	"D'oh Canada"
30	Lucas Meyer	Justin Trudeau	660–3021	YABF14	"D'oh Canada"
30	Ken Burns	Himself	661–3022	YABF15	"Woo-Hoo Dunnit?"
30	Will Forte	King Toot	661–3022	YABF15	"Woo-Hoo Dunnit?"
30	Jackie Mason	Rabbi Hyman Krustofsky	661–3022	YABF15	"Woo-Hoo Dunnit?"
30	Liev Schreiber	"Dateline: Springfield" Narrator	661–3022	YABF15	"Woo-Hoo Dunnit?"
30	Illeana Douglas	New Age Clerk	662–3023	YABF16	"Crystal Blue-Haired Persuasion"
30	Werner Herzog	Walter Hotenhoffer	662–3023	YABF16	"Crystal Blue-Haired Persuasion"
30	Jenny Slate	Piper Paisley	662–3023	YABF16	"Crystal Blue-Haired Persuasion"
31	John Mulaney	Warburton Parker	663–3101	YABF19	"The Winter of Our Monetized Content"
31	Joe Mantegna	Fat Tony	664–3102	YABF21	"Go Big or Go Homer"
31	Michael Rapaport	Mike Wegman	664–3102	YABF21	"Go Big or Go Homer"
31	Joe Mantegna	Fat Tony	665–3103	YABF22	"The Fat Blue Line"
31	Jason Momoa	Himself	665–3103	YABF22	"The Fat Blue Line"
31	Bob Odenkirk	Mob Lawyer	665–3103	YABF22	"The Fat Blue Line"
31	Jane Goodall	Herself	667–3105	YABF20	"Gorillas on the Mast"
31	Asia Kate Dillon	Paula	668–3106	ZABF02	"Marge the Lumberjill"
31	Natasha Lyonne	Sophie Krustofsky	668–3106	ZABF02	"Marge the Lumberjill"
31	Jill Sobule	Performing "Lumberjill"	668–3106	ZABF02	"Marge the Lumberjill"
31	Fortune Feimster	Evelyn	669–3107	ZABF03	"Livin La Pura Vida"
31	Charlie Brooker	Social Media App voice	670–3108	YABF17	"Thanksgiving of Horror"
31	Glenn Close	Mona Simpson	671–3109	ZABF04	"Todd, Todd, Why Hast Thou Forsaken Me?"
31	Marcia Wallace (Note: Wallace's appearance consisted of archival audio of Edna Krabappel's laugh used in a new scene.)	Edna Krabappel	671–3109	ZABF04	"Todd, Todd, Why Hast Thou Forsaken Me?"
31	Scott Bakula	Himself	672–3110	ZABF01	"Bobby, It's Cold Outside"
31	Steve Ballmer	Himself	672–3110	ZABF01	"Bobby, It's Cold Outside"
31	Kelsey Grammer	Sideshow Bob	672–3110	ZABF01	"Bobby, It's Cold Outside"
31	Donna Reed (archival)	Mary Hatch	672–3110	ZABF01	"Bobby, It's Cold Outside"
31	James Stewart (archival)	George Bailey	672–3110	ZABF01	"Bobby, It's Cold Outside"
31	Jon Lovitz	Artie Ziff; Rabbi	673–3111	ZABF05	"Hail to the Teeth"
31	John Legend	Himself	674–3112	ZABF06	"The Miseducation of Lisa Simpson"
31	Chrissy Teigen	Herself	674–3112	ZABF06	"The Miseducation of Lisa Simpson"
31	Zach Woods	Zane Furlong	674–3112	ZABF06	"The Miseducation of Lisa Simpson"
31	Beanie Feldstein	Celebrity Executive Assistant Therapist	675–3113	ZABF07	"Frinkcoin"
31	Ed "Too Tall" Jones	Himself	675–3113	ZABF07	"Frinkcoin"
31	Jim Parsons	Himself	675–3113	ZABF07	"Frinkcoin"
31	Kevin Feige	Chinnos	676–3114	ZABF08	"Bart the Bad Guy"
31	Tal Fishman	Reaction Guy	676–3114	ZABF08	"Bart the Bad Guy"
31	Taran Killam	Glen Tangier / Airshot	676–3114	ZABF08	"Bart the Bad Guy"
31	Joe Mantegna	Fat Tony	676–3114	ZABF08	"Bart the Bad Guy"
31	Anthony Russo	Movie Executive #2	676–3114	ZABF08	"Bart the Bad Guy"
31	Joe Russo	Movie Executive #1	676–3114	ZABF08	"Bart the Bad Guy"
31	Cobie Smulders	Hydrangea	676–3114	ZABF08	"Bart the Bad Guy"
31	Dana Gould	Himself	677–3115	ZABF09	"Screenless"
31	Werner Herzog	Dr. Lund	677–3115	ZABF09	"Screenless"
31	Dr. Drew Pinsky	Himself	677–3115	ZABF09	"Screenless"
31	Chelsea Peretti	Lauren	679–3117	ZABF10	"Highway to Well"
31	Billy Porter	Desmond	679–3117	ZABF10	"Highway to Well"
31	Kevin Smith	Himself	679–3117	ZABF10	"Highway to Well"
31	Pete Holmes	Bode Wright	681–3119	ZABF12	"Warrin' Priests"
31	Pete Holmes	Bode Wright	682–3120	ZABF13	"Warrin' Priests: Part Two"
31	Joe Mantegna	Fat Tony	682–3120	ZABF13	"Warrin' Priests: Part Two"
31	David Silverman	Himself	682–3120	ZABF13	"Warrin' Priests: Part Two"
31	Joey King	Addy / Addison	683–3121	ZABF14	"The Hateful Eight-Year-Olds"
31	Camila Mendes	Tessa Rose	683–3121	ZABF14	"The Hateful Eight-Year-Olds"
31	Madelaine Petsch	Sloan	683–3121	ZABF14	"The Hateful Eight-Year-Olds"
31	Lili Reinhart	Bella-Ella	683–3121	ZABF14	"The Hateful Eight-Year-Olds"
31	Lilly Singh	Kensey	683–3121	ZABF14	"The Hateful Eight-Year-Olds"
31	Weezer (Note: Consisting of Brian Bell, Rivers Cuomo, Scott Shriner and Patrick Wilson.)	Sailor's Delight; Themselves	683–3121	ZABF14	"The Hateful Eight-Year-Olds"
31	Cate Blanchett	Elaine Wolff	684–3122	ZABF16	"The Way of the Dog"
31	Suzanne Waters	Sings "The Way We Were"	684–3122	ZABF16	"The Way of the Dog"
31	Michael York	Clayton	684–3122	ZABF16	"The Way of the Dog"
32	David Harbour	Fred Kranepool (Mr. Burns)	685–3201	ZABF19	"Undercover Burns"
32	Phil Rosenthal	Himself	685–3201	ZABF19	"Undercover Burns"
32	Joe Mantegna	Gordus Antonius	686–3202	ZABF18	"I, Carumbus"
32	Michael Palin	Museum Curator	686–3202	ZABF18	"I, Carumbus"
32	Ben Mankiewicz	Himself	688–3204	ZABF17	"Treehouse of Horror XXXI"
32	Olivia Colman	Lily	689–3205	ZABF15	"The 7 Beer Itch"
32	Robin Atkin Downes	Various Englishmen	689–3205	ZABF15	"The 7 Beer Itch"
32	Brian George	Various Englishmen	689–3205	ZABF15	"The 7 Beer Itch"
32	Morgan Fairchild	Vivienne St. Charmaine	690–3206	ZABF22	"Podcast News"
32	Christine Nangle	Tabitha Shingle	690–3206	ZABF22	"Podcast News"
32	Stellan Skarsgård	Himself	690–3206	ZABF22	"Podcast News"
32	Ben Platt	Blake	691–3207	QABF02	"Three Dreams Denied"
32	Paul Rudd	Himself	691–3207	QABF02	"Three Dreams Denied"
32	Jason Bateman	Himself	692–3208	ZABF20	"The Road to Cincinnati"
32	Hannibal Buress	Principal Finch	692–3208	ZABF20	"The Road to Cincinnati"
32	Christine Nangle	Ms. Timberwood	693–3209	QABF01	"Sorry Not Sorry"
32	Ariana Piknjac	Performing End-Titles music	693–3209	QABF01	"Sorry Not Sorry"
32	Ella Piknjac	Performing End-Titles music	693–3209	QABF01	"Sorry Not Sorry"
32	Ellie Kemper	Mary Tannenbaum	694–3210	QABF03	"A Springfield Summer Christmas for Christmas"
32	Richard Kind	Director	694–3210	QABF03	"A Springfield Summer Christmas for Christmas"
32	Chris Parnell	Surgeon Fiancé	694–3210	QABF03	"A Springfield Summer Christmas for Christmas"
32	Dan Aykroyd	Postage Stamp Fellow	695–3211	QABF04	"The Dad-Feelings Limited"
32	Bob Balaban	Narrator	695–3211	QABF04	"The Dad-Feelings Limited"
32	Joe Mantegna	Fat Tony	696–3212	QABF05	"Diary Queen"
32	Mario Jose	Julio's singing voice	696–3212	QABF05	"Diary Queen"
32	Christine Nangle	Ms. Timberwood	696–3212	QABF05	"Diary Queen"
32	Marcia Wallace (Note: Wallace's appearance consisted of archival audio of Edna Krabappel used in new scenes.)	Edna Krabappel	696–3212	QABF05	"Diary Queen"
32	Stephen Root	Bildorf	697–3213	QABF06	"Wad Goals"
32	James Sie	Lama	697–3213	QABF06	"Wad Goals"
32	Albert Brooks	Slick Manager	698–3214	QABF07	"Yokel Hero"
32	J. J. Abrams	Himself	699–3215	QABF08	"Do Pizza Bots Dream of Electric Guitars"
32	Greg Grunberg	Bad Robot Head of Security	699–3215	QABF08	"Do Pizza Bots Dream of Electric Guitars"
32	Joe Mantegna	Fat Tony	701–3217	QABF10	"Uncut Femmes"
32	Megan Mullally	Sarah Wiggum	701–3217	QABF10	"Uncut Femmes"
32	Nick Offerman	Captain Joseph "Joe" Bowditch	701–3217	QABF10	"Uncut Femmes"
32	Natasha Rothwell	Bette	701–3217	QABF10	"Uncut Femmes"
32	Bob Seger	Himself	701–3217	QABF10	"Uncut Femmes"
32	Tiya Sircar	Erin	701–3217	QABF10	"Uncut Femmes"
32	Benedict Cumberbatch	Quilloughby	703–3219	QABF12	"Panic on the Streets of Springfield"
32	Werner Herzog	The Amazing Herzog	704–3220	QABF14	"Mother and Child Reunion"
32	Nate Silver	Himself	704–3220	QABF14	"Mother and Child Reunion"
32	George Stephanopoulos	Himself	704–3220	QABF14	"Mother and Child Reunion"
32	Robin Atkin Downes	MI5 Agents	705–3221	QABF13	"The Man from G.R.A.M.P.A."
32	Stephen Fry	Terrance; Head of MI5; Terrance's Father; Hazel	705–3221	QABF13	"The Man from G.R.A.M.P.A."
32	Brian George	MI5 Agents	705–3221	QABF13	"The Man from G.R.A.M.P.A."
32	Trevor Howard (archival)	Major Calloway	705–3221	QABF13	"The Man from G.R.A.M.P.A."
32	Maurice LaMarche	Orson Welles	705–3221	QABF13	"The Man from G.R.A.M.P.A."
32	Dima Malanitchev	Russian See 'n Say	705–3221	QABF13	"The Man from G.R.A.M.P.A."
32	Cesar Mazariegos	Grampa Baby	706–3222	QABF15	"The Last Barfighter"
32	Ian McShane	Artemis	706–3222	QABF15	"The Last Barfighter"
33	Elisabeth Kiernan Averick	Artsy Teenage Girl	707–3301	QABF17	"The Star of the Backstage"
33	Kristen Bell	Marge's internal singing voice	707–3301	QABF17	"The Star of the Backstage"
33	Sara Chase	Sasha Reed	707–3301	QABF17	"The Star of the Backstage"
33	Joel H. Cohen	Old Joel	708–3302	QABF18	"Bart's In Jail!"
33	Alan Cumming	Loki	708–3302	QABF18	"Bart's In Jail!"
33	Scott Hanson	"Punt Zone" Announcer	708–3302	QABF18	"Bart's In Jail!"
33	Alex Hirsch	Bill Cipher	708–3302	QABF18	"Bart's In Jail!"
33	Susan Egan	Sings "You'll Never Sleep Again"	709–3303	QABF16	"Treehouse of Horror XXXII"
33	Maurice LaMarche	Vincent Price	709–3303	QABF16	"Treehouse of Horror XXXII"
33	Tree Rollins	Himself	709–3303	QABF16	"Treehouse of Horror XXXII"
33	Trey Anastasio (Note: Anastasio had previously guest starred in "Weekend at Burnsie's" as part of his band Phish.)	Himself	710–3304	QABF19	"The Wayz We Were"
33	Pamela Reed	Ruth Powers	710–3304	QABF19	"The Wayz We Were"
33	Renee Ridgeley	Dr. Wendy Sage	711–3305	QABF20	"Lisa's Belly"
33	Brian Cox	Kostas Becker	712–3306	QABF21	"A Serious Flanders"
33	Joe Mantegna	Fat Tony	712–3306	QABF21	"A Serious Flanders"
33	Cristin Milioti	Barbara "Barb" Belfry	712–3306	QABF21	"A Serious Flanders"
33	Chris O'Dowd	Seamus	712–3306	QABF21	"A Serious Flanders"
33	Timothy Olyphant	Sheriff Ned "Paw Paw" Flanders	712–3306	QABF21	"A Serious Flanders"
33	Jessica Paré	Collette	712–3306	QABF21	"A Serious Flanders"
33	Brian Cox	Kostas Becker	713–3307	QABF22	"A Serious Flanders (Part 2)"
33	Cristin Milioti	Barbara "Barb" Belfry	713–3307	QABF22	"A Serious Flanders (Part 2)"
33	Chris O'Dowd	Seamus	713–3307	QABF22	"A Serious Flanders (Part 2)"
33	Timothy Olyphant	Sheriff Ned "Paw Paw" Flanders	713–3307	QABF22	"A Serious Flanders (Part 2)"
33	Jessica Paré	Collette	713–3307	QABF22	"A Serious Flanders (Part 2)"
33	Christine Baranski	Herself	714–3308	UABF01	"Portrait of a Lackey on Fire"
33	Victor Garber	Michael de Graaf	714–3308	UABF01	"Portrait of a Lackey on Fire"
33	Christian Siriano	Himself	714–3308	UABF01	"Portrait of a Lackey on Fire"
33	Rachel Bloom	Annette	715–3309	UABF02	"Mothers and Other Strangers"
33	Glenn Close	Mona Simpson	715–3309	UABF02	"Mothers and Other Strangers"
33	Joe Mantegna	Fat Tony	716–3310	UABF03	"A Made Maggie"
33	Beck Bennett	Grayson Mathers	717–3311	UABF05	"The Longest Marge"
33	John Mulaney	Warburton Parker	717–3311	UABF05	"The Longest Marge"
33	Adam Schefter	Himself	717–3311	UABF05	"The Longest Marge"
33	Kumail Nanjiani	Theo	720–3314	UABF07	"You Won't Believe What This Episode Is About – Act Three Will Shock You!"
33	Jay Pharoah	Drederick Tatum	720–3314	UABF07	"You Won't Believe What This Episode Is About – Act Three Will Shock You!"
33	Michael Rapaport	Mike Wegman	721–3315	UABF08	"Bart the Cool Kid"
33	The Weeknd	Orion Hughes; Darius Hughes	721–3315	UABF08	"Bart the Cool Kid"
33	Kelly Macleod	Sings "Duplicate Cop 2" theme song	721–3315	UABF08	"Bart the Cool Kid"
33	Kaylee Arellano	Deaf Child singing "Happy Talk" #1	723–3317	UABF10	"The Sound of Bleeding Gums"
33	John Autry II	Monk Murphy	723–3317	UABF10	"The Sound of Bleeding Gums"
33	Kathy Buckley	Deaf Thespian Girl / Richard III	723–3317	UABF10	"The Sound of Bleeding Gums"
33	Hazel Lopez	Deaf Child singing "Happy Talk" #2	723–3317	UABF10	"The Sound of Bleeding Gums"
33	Ian Mayorga	Deaf Child singing "Happy Talk" #3	723–3317	UABF10	"The Sound of Bleeding Gums"
33	Eli Steele	"The Sky's the Limit" Director	723–3317	UABF10	"The Sound of Bleeding Gums"
33	Kerry Washington	Rayshelle Peyton	724–3318	UABF11	"My Octopus and a Teacher"
33	Chris Redd	Trevor McBride	725–3319	UABF12	"Girls Just Shauna Have Fun"
33	Nicholas Braun	"Cousin" Greg Hirsch	727–3321	UABF13	"Meat Is Murder"
33	Charli D'Amelio	Herself	727–3321	UABF13	"Meat Is Murder"
33	Susan Egan	Singing Tree	727–3321	UABF13	"Meat Is Murder"
33	Seth Green	Mav Redfield	727–3321	UABF13	"Meat Is Murder"
33	John Lithgow	Augustus "Gus" Redfield	727–3321	UABF13	"Meat Is Murder"
33	Edi Patterson	Jessica	727–3321	UABF13	"Meat Is Murder"
33	Krysten Ritter	Sheila Redfield	727–3321	UABF13	"Meat Is Murder"
33	Paul F. Tompkins	Colby Redfield	727–3321	UABF13	"Meat Is Murder"
33	Hugh Jackman	Janitor	728–3322	UABF14	"Poorhouse Rock"
33	Megan Mullally	Sarah Wiggum	728–3322	UABF14	"Poorhouse Rock"
33	Robert Reich	Himself	728–3322	UABF14	"Poorhouse Rock"
34	Joe Mantegna	Fat Tony	729–3401	UABF16	"Habeas Tortoise"
34	Jay Pharoah	Drederick Tatum	729–3401	UABF16	"Habeas Tortoise"
34	Jane Kaczmarek	Judge Constance Harm	730–3402	UABF19	"One Angry Lisa"
34	Joe Mantegna	Fat Tony	730–3402	UABF19	"One Angry Lisa"
34	Anna Faris	Ashley the Female Hacker	731–3403	UABF21	"Lisa the Boy Scout"
34	Matthew Friend	Baby Jeff Goldblum	731–3403	UABF21	"Lisa the Boy Scout"
34	Megan Mullally	Sarah Wiggum	731–3403	UABF21	"Lisa the Boy Scout"
34	Drew Barrymore	Herself	732–3404	UABF20	"The King of Nice"
34	Renee Ridgeley	Dr. Wendy Sage	732–3404	UABF20	"The King of Nice"
34	James Sie	Segment Producer #2	732–3404	UABF20	"The King of Nice"
34	John Roberts	Linda Belcher	734–3406	UABF18	"Treehouse of Horror XXXIII"
34	Hank Williams Jr.	Sings "Canyonero!"	734–3406	UABF18	"Treehouse of Horror XXXIII"
34	Paul Brittain	Brandon	735–3407	OABF01	"From Beer to Paternity"
34	Aubrey Plaza	Amber Duffman	735–3407	OABF01	"From Beer to Paternity"
34	Carol Kane	Blythe	736–3408	UABF22	"Step Brother from the Same Planet"
34	Melissa McCarthy	Calvin	736–3408	UABF22	"Step Brother from the Same Planet"
34	Simu Liu	Adult Hubert Wong	737–3409	OABF02	"When Nelson Met Lisa"
34	Natasha Lyonne	Sophie Krustofsky	737–3409	OABF02	"When Nelson Met Lisa"
34	Jackie Mason (Note: Mason's appearance consisted of one line of archival audio from the episode "Clown in the Dumps" used in a new scene, Jackie Mason having passed away in 2021.)	Rabbi Hyman Krustofsky Hologram	737–3409	OABF02	"When Nelson Met Lisa"
34	Montse Hernandez	Astrid	738–3410	OABF03	"Game Done Changed"
34	Will Forte	King Toot	739–3411	OABF04	"Top Goon"
34	Stu Grimson	Himself	739–3411	OABF04	"Top Goon"
34	Joe Mantegna	Fat Tony	739–3411	OABF04	"Top Goon"
34	Dave Schultz	Himself	739–3411	OABF04	"Top Goon"
34	Dave "Tiger" Williams	Himself	739–3411	OABF04	"Top Goon"
34	Bob the Drag Queen	Herself	740–3412	OABF05	"My Life as a Vlog"
34	Monét X Change	Herself	740–3412	OABF05	"My Life as a Vlog"
34	Michael Rapaport	Mike Wegman	740–3412	OABF05	"My Life as a Vlog"
34	Paul Fusco	ALF on TV Guide	741–3413	OABF06	"The Many Saints of Springfield"
34	Kipp Lennon	Italian American singer	741–3413	OABF06	"The Many Saints of Springfield"
34	Joe Mantegna	Fat Tony	741–3413	OABF06	"The Many Saints of Springfield"
34	John Autry II	Monk Murphy	742–3414	OABF07	"Carl Carlson Rides Again"
34	Henry Louis Gates Jr.	Himself	742–3414	OABF07	"Carl Carlson Rides Again"
34	Kerry Washington	Rayshelle Peyton	743–3415	OABF08	"Bartless"
34	Kerry Washington	Rayshelle Peyton	744–3416	OABF09	"Hostile Kirk Place"
34	"Weird Al" Yankovic	Himself	744–3416	OABF09	"Hostile Kirk Place"
34	Fred Armisen	Terrence	745–3417	OABF10	"Pin Gal"
34	Albert Brooks	Jacques	745–3417	OABF10	"Pin Gal"
34	Billy Eichner	Billy	746–3418	OABF11	"Fan-ily Feud"
34	Jade Novah	Ashlee Starling; Echo	746–3418	OABF11	"Fan-ily Feud"
34	Rob Lowe	Cousin Peter	748–3420	OABF14	"The Very Hungry Caterpillars"
34	Joe Mantegna	Fat Tony	749–3421	OABF15	"Clown V. Board of Education"
34	Lizzo	Goobie-Woo; Herself	750–3422	OABF13	"Homer's Adventures Through the Windshield Glass"
34	Tim Robinson	Mercer	750–3422	OABF13	"Homer's Adventures Through the Windshield Glass"
34	James Sie	Pol Pot	750–3422	OABF13	"Homer's Adventures Through the Windshield Glass"
34	Bowen Yang	Richard	750–3422	OABF13	"Homer's Adventures Through the Windshield Glass"
35	Kerry Washington	Rayshelle Peyton; Grocery Store Announcer	752–3502	OABF16	"A Mid-Childhood Night's Dream"
35	Rosalie Chiang	Hubert Wong	753–3503	OABF20	"McMansion & Wife"
35	Dick Van Dyke	Himself	753–3503	OABF20	"McMansion & Wife"
35	Christiane Amanpour	Herself	754–3504	OABF21	"Thirst Trap: A Corporate Love Story"
35	Elizabeth Banks	Persephone Odair	754–3504	OABF21	"Thirst Trap: A Corporate Love Story"
35	Ken Burns	Himself	754–3504	OABF21	"Thirst Trap: A Corporate Love Story"
35	Peter Coyote	Himself	754–3504	OABF21	"Thirst Trap: A Corporate Love Story"
35	Peter Jackson	Himself	754–3504	OABF21	"Thirst Trap: A Corporate Love Story"
35	Andrew Ross Sorkin	Himself	754–3504	OABF21	"Thirst Trap: A Corporate Love Story"
35	Kara Swisher	Herself	754–3504	OABF21	"Thirst Trap: A Corporate Love Story"
35	Matthew Friend	Jimmy Fallon	755–3505	OABF17	"Treehouse of Horror XXXIV"
35	Kelsey Grammer	Sideshow Bob	755–3505	OABF17	"Treehouse of Horror XXXIV"
35	Kylie Jenner	Herself	755–3505	OABF17	"Treehouse of Horror XXXIV"
35	Megan Mullally	Sarah Wiggum	756–3506	OABF22	"Iron Marge"
35	Belle & Sebastian	Themselves; Performing "Willie and the Dream of Peat Bogs"	758–3508	35ABF02	"Ae Bonny Romance"
35	Karen Gillan	Maisie MacWeldon	758–3508	35ABF02	"Ae Bonny Romance"
35	Paul Higgins	Hamish MacWeldon "Ticket Booth" Actor	758–3508	35ABF02	"Ae Bonny Romance"
35	David Tennant	Pa MacWeldon	758–3508	35ABF02	"Ae Bonny Romance"
35	Maurice LaMarche	Hedonismbot Cosplayer	759–3509	35ABF04	"Murder, She Boat"
35	Taika Waititi	Himself	759–3509	35ABF04	"Murder, She Boat"
35	John Coggins	Sings "Get Our Cheat On"	760–3510	35ABF01	"Do the Wrong Thing"
35	Ken Marino	Dean Belichick	760–3510	35ABF01	"Do the Wrong Thing"
35	Dan Patrick	Rock-Skipping Announcer	760–3510	35ABF01	"Do the Wrong Thing"
35	Amanda Seyfried	Dr. Lori Spivak	761–3511	35ABF03	"Frinkenstein's Monster"
35	Matt Berry	Chester Arborday	762–3512	35ABF05	"Lisa Gets an F1"
35	Rachel Bloom	Annette	762–3512	35ABF05	"Lisa Gets an F1"
35	Cesar Mazariegos	Violencia Gigante Singer	763–3513	35ABF06	"Clan of the Cave Mom"
35	Kerry Washington	Rayshelle Peyton	763–3513	35ABF06	"Clan of the Cave Mom"
35	Jason Mantzoukas	Finn Bon Idée	764–3514	35ABF07	"Night of the Living Wage"
35	Joe Mantegna	Fat Tony	765–3515	35ABF09	"Cremains of the Day"
35	Kipp Lennon	Sings "Leevi's" (parody of the song Levon)	766–3516	35ABF10	"The Tell-Tale Pants"
35	Kyle Gordon	DJ Crazy Times	767–3517	35ABF11	"The Tipping Point"
35	Chrissi Poland	Ms. Biljana Electonica	767–3517	35ABF11	"The Tipping Point"
35	Audrey Trullinger	Inga	767–3517	35ABF11	"The Tipping Point"
35	Megan Mullally	Sarah Wiggum	768–3518	35ABF12	"Bart's Brain"
35	Kerry Washington	Rayshelle Peyton	768–3518	35ABF12	"Bart's Brain"
36	John Cena	Himself	769-3601	35ABF15	"Bart's Birthday"
36	Danny DeVito	Herbert Powell	769-3601	35ABF15	"Bart's Birthday"
36	Tom Hanks	Himself	769-3601	35ABF15	"Bart's Birthday"
36	Joel McHale	Himself	769-3601	35ABF15	"Bart's Birthday"
36	Conan O'Brien	Himself	769-3601	35ABF15	"Bart's Birthday"
36	Mark Proksch	HackGPT	769-3601	35ABF15	"Bart's Birthday"
36	Seth Rogen	Himself	769-3601	35ABF15	"Bart's Birthday"
36	Amy Sedaris	Maggie Simpson	769-3601	35ABF15	"Bart's Birthday"
36	Chloe Fineman	Tasha	770-3602	35ABF08	"The Yellow Lotus"
36	Kelsey Grammer	Sideshow Bob	770-3602	35ABF08	"The Yellow Lotus"
36	Jay Pharoah	Drederick Tatum	770-3602	35ABF08	"The Yellow Lotus"
36	Kara Talve	Sings "Yellow Lotus Theme" (parody of The White Lotus theme)	770-3602	35ABF08	"The Yellow Lotus"
36	Griffin Dunne	Cockroach Actor	771-3603	35ABF18	"Desperately Seeking Lisa"
36	Richard E. Grant	Julian; British voice	771-3603	35ABF18	"Desperately Seeking Lisa"
36	Tracy Letts	Himself	771-3603	35ABF18	"Desperately Seeking Lisa"
36	Molly Shannon	Katya	771-3603	35ABF18	"Desperately Seeking Lisa"
36	Topher Grace	William "Billy" O'Donnell	772-3604	35ABF16	"Shoddy Heat"
36	Juan Carlos Enriquez	Sings "Jarabe Tapatío"	773-3605	35ABF13	"Treehouse of Horror XXXV"
36	Jorge R. Gutierrez	Sings "Jarabe Tapatío"	773-3605	35ABF13	"Treehouse of Horror XXXV"
36	Rob LaZebnik	Spit-Takers Anonymous Guy	773-3605	35ABF13	"Treehouse of Horror XXXV"
36	Tim Yoon	Sings "Jarabe Tapatío"	773-3605	35ABF13	"Treehouse of Horror XXXV"
36	Christine Nangle	Mom Goods Manager	774-3606	35ABF17	"Women in Shorts"
36	Ruth Reichl	Herself	774-3606	35ABF17	"Women in Shorts"
36	Renee Ridgeley	Dr. Wendy Sage	774-3606	35ABF17	"Women in Shorts"
36	Kerry Washington	Rayshelle Peyton	774-3606	35ABF17	"Women in Shorts"
36	Andy Serkis	Illustrated Man; Siegfried Blaze	775-3607	35ABF14	"Treehouse of Horror Presents: Simpsons Wicked This Way Comes"
36	Kate Berlant	Stressed Woman	776-3608	36ABF01	"Convenience Airways"
36	John Early	Joel	776-3608	36ABF01	"Convenience Airways"
36	Jay Pharoah	Drederick Tatum	776-3608	36ABF01	"Convenience Airways"
36	John Pirruccello	Warren Wingspan	776-3608	36ABF01	"Convenience Airways"
36	Ike Barinholtz	Wayne the Grip	777-3609	36ABF03	"Homer and Her Sisters"
36	Susie Essman	Aunt Sadie Krustofsky	777-3609	36ABF03	"Homer and Her Sisters"
36	Jay Pharoah	Drederick Tatum	777-3609	36ABF03	"Homer and Her Sisters"
36|D+	Derren Brown	Himself	778-3610; 779-3611	35ABF21; 35ABF22	"O C'mon All Ye Faithful"
36|D+	Patti LaBelle	Herself	778-3610; 779-3611	35ABF21; 35ABF22	"O C'mon All Ye Faithful"
36|D+	Pentatonix (Note: Consisting of Mitch Grassi, Kirstin Maldonado, Scott Hoying, Kevin Olusola and Matt Sallee.)	Themselves; Christmas Carol singers	778-3610; 779-3611	35ABF21; 35ABF22	"O C'mon All Ye Faithful"
36|D+	Kara Talve	Bart Simpson's singing voice	778-3610; 779-3611	35ABF21; 35ABF22	"O C'mon All Ye Faithful"
36	Glenn Close	Mona Simpson	780-3612	36ABF02	"The Man Who Flew Too Much"
36	Robert Parker	Himself	781-3613	36ABF04	"Bottle Episode"
36|D+	Joseph Gordon-Levitt	Monty B	782-3614	35ABF19	"The Past and the Furious"
36	Rachel Bloom	Annette	783-3615	36ABF05	"The Flandshees of Innersimpson"
36	Jane Kaczmarek	Judge Constance Harm	783-3615	36ABF05	"The Flandshees of Innersimpson"
36	Fiona Shaw	Mrs. McCormick	783-3615	36ABF05	"The Flandshees of Innersimpson"
36	Sidse Babett Knudsen	Othinquic Pen	784-3616	36ABF06	"The Last Man Expanding"
36	Joe Mantegna	Fat Tony	784-3616	36ABF06	"The Last Man Expanding"
36	Beverly D'Angelo	Lurleen Lumpkin	785-3617	36ABF07	"P.S. I Hate You"
36	Jon Lovitz	Artie Ziff	785-3617	36ABF07	"P.S. I Hate You"
36	Tim Meadows	Himself	785-3617	36ABF07	"P.S. I Hate You"
36|D+	Hugh Bonneville	Narrator	786-3618	35ABF20	"Yellow Planet"
36	Kevin Burkhardt	Himself	787-3619	36ABF08	"Abe League of Their Moe"
36	Jamie Demetriou	Aeropos Walkov	787-3619	36ABF08	"Abe League of Their Moe"
36	Steve Gelbs	Himself	787-3619	36ABF08	"Abe League of Their Moe"
36	Kevin Millar	Himself	787-3619	36ABF08	"Abe League of Their Moe"
36	Kelena Neskoska	Sings Macedonian cover of "Take Me Out to the Ball Game"	787-3619	36ABF08	"Abe League of Their Moe"
36	Navena Neskoska	Sings Macedonian cover of "Take Me Out to the Ball Game"	787-3619	36ABF08	"Abe League of Their Moe"
36	Naum Neskoski	Sings Macedonian cover of "Take Me Out to the Ball Game"	787-3619	36ABF08	"Abe League of Their Moe"
36	Jimmy "Jomboy" O'Brien	Himself	787-3619	36ABF08	"Abe League of Their Moe"
36	Chris Rock	Himself	787-3619	36ABF08	"Abe League of Their Moe"
36	Kara Talve	Sings Macedonian cover of "Take Me Out to the Ball Game"	787-3619	36ABF08	"Abe League of Their Moe"
36	Danny Trejo	Himself	787-3619	36ABF08	"Abe League of Their Moe"
36	John DiMaggio	Thad Parkour	788-3620	36ABF09	"Stew Lies"
36	Maurice LaMarche	Wilhelm von Wonthelm	788-3620	36ABF09	"Stew Lies"
36	Joe Mantegna	Fat Tony; Fat Tony's Father	788-3620	36ABF09	"Stew Lies"
36	Angelo Moore	Additional Ska vocals	788-3620	36ABF09	"Stew Lies"
36	Blake Griffin	Himself	789-3621	36ABF10	"Full Heart, Empty Pool"
36	Andrew Luck	Himself	789-3621	36ABF10	"Full Heart, Empty Pool"
36	Megan Rapinoe	Herself	789-3621	36ABF10	"Full Heart, Empty Pool"
36	Robert Smigel	Gabriel Razelton	789-3621	36ABF10	"Full Heart, Empty Pool"
36	Rick Steves	Himself	789-3621	36ABF10	"Full Heart, Empty Pool"
36	Zooey Deschanel	Quirk Girl	790-3622	36ABF11	"Estranger Things"
36	Gary LeRoi Gray	Sings Itchy & Scratchy Show Reboot theme	790-3622	36ABF11	"Estranger Things"
36	Max Greenfield	Schultz	790-3622	36ABF11	"Estranger Things"
36	Sarah McLachlan	Herself	790-3622	36ABF11	"Estranger Things"
37	Paul Brittain	Shawn Garrett Evanson / Keagan	791-3701	36ABF13	"Thrifty Ways to Thieve Your Mother"
37	Cole Escola	Devin	791-3701	36ABF13	"Thrifty Ways to Thieve Your Mother"
37	David Herman	John "Clincher" Clinch	791-3701	36ABF13	"Thrifty Ways to Thieve Your Mother"
37	Stephanie Hsu	Vidalia	791-3701	36ABF13	"Thrifty Ways to Thieve Your Mother"
37	Rosalie Chiang	Hubert Wong	792-3702	36ABF14	"Keep Chalm and Gary On"
37	Cole Escola	Devin	792-3702	36ABF14	"Keep Chalm and Gary On"
37	Adam Pally	Ben	792-3702	36ABF14	"Keep Chalm and Gary On"
37	Kerry Washington	Rayshelle Peyton	792-3702	36ABF14	"Keep Chalm and Gary On"
37	Ike Barinholtz	Wayne the Grip	793-3703	36ABF15	"Treehouse of Horror XXXVI"
37	Viola Davis	Plastic World Narrator (Plastic Maggie Simpson)	793-3703	36ABF15	"Treehouse of Horror XXXVI"
37	Idris Elba	The Devil	793-3703	36ABF15	"Treehouse of Horror XXXVI"
37	Matt Groening	Himself	793-3703	36ABF15	"Treehouse of Horror XXXVI"
37	Michael Keaton	Hal Julian	793-3703	36ABF15	"Treehouse of Horror XXXVI"
37	Albert Brooks	Greg	794-3704	36ABF12	"Men Behaving Manly"
37	Maurice LaMarche	Fred Flintstone-like Man	794-3704	36ABF12	"Men Behaving Manly"
37	Troy Baker	Jonesy	795-3705	36ABF17	"Bad Boys... for Life?"
37	Maurice LaMarche	Jerry Seinfeld	795-3705	36ABF17	"Bad Boys... for Life?"
37	Matthew Modine	Dr. Leonard Stern	795-3705	36ABF17	"Bad Boys... for Life?"
37	Suzie Yeung	Hope	795-3705	36ABF17	"Bad Boys... for Life?"
37	Rosalie Chiang	Hubert Wong	796-3706	36ABF16	"Bart 'N' Frink"
37	Glenn Howerton	Pete Linz	796-3706	36ABF16	"Bart 'N' Frink"
37	Danny Pudi	Johnson Bryans	796-3706	36ABF16	"Bart 'N' Frink"
37	Carrie Coon	Beatrice Bouvier	797-3707	36ABF18	"Sashes to Sashes"
37	Cole Escola	Devin	797-3707	36ABF18	"Sashes to Sashes"
37	Brendan Gleeson	Elderly Joe Quimby Sr.	797-3707	36ABF18	"Sashes to Sashes"
37	Domhnall Gleeson	Young Joe Quimby Sr.	797-3707	36ABF18	"Sashes to Sashes"
37	Christine Nangle	Additional voices	797-3707	36ABF18	"Sashes to Sashes"
37	Paget Brewster	FBI Profiler	798-3708	37ABF01	"The Day of the Jack-up"
37	Symone Holliday	Kneesock Dolls (live action)	798-3708	37ABF01	"The Day of the Jack-up"
37	Courtney Rosemont	Kneesock Dolls (live action)	798-3708	37ABF01	"The Day of the Jack-up"
37	Mike Cullen	Rusty the Piercer	799-3709	37ABF02	"Aunt Misbehavin'"
37	Gary Janetti	Stylish Patron	799-3709	37ABF02	"Aunt Misbehavin'"
37	Stephen Tobolowsky	Merle	799-3709	37ABF02	"Aunt Misbehavin'"
37	Kieran Culkin	Alexander "Hub" Hubley	800-3710	37ABF04	"Guess Who's Coming to Skinner"
37	Karen Gillan	Maisie MacWeldon-MacDougal	800-3710	37ABF04	"Guess Who's Coming to Skinner"
37	Kurtwood Smith	Mr. Hubley	800-3710	37ABF04	"Guess Who's Coming to Skinner"
37	Barry Sonnenfeld	Mr. Ho-Hum / Phillip	800-3710	37ABF04	"Guess Who's Coming to Skinner"
37	Kerry Washington	Rayshelle Peyton	800-3710	37ABF04	"Guess Who's Coming to Skinner"
37	Lindsay Lohan	Future Maggie Simpson	801-3711	37ABF03	"Parahormonal Activity"
37	Jon Lovitz	Artie Ziff	801-3711	37ABF03	"Parahormonal Activity"
37	Patricia Acevedo (Note: While she is guest starring in the original English version of this episode, Acevedo is part of the main cast for the Latin American dub of the show, voicing Lisa Simpson.)	Channel Ocho Script Supervisor; Mexican Little Girl	802-3712	37ABF06	"¡The Fall Guy-Yi-Yi!"
37	Alejandro González Iñárritu	Himself	802-3712	37ABF06	"¡The Fall Guy-Yi-Yi!"
37	Johnny Knoxville	Himself	802-3712	37ABF06	"¡The Fall Guy-Yi-Yi!"
37	Los Tigres Del Norte (Note: consisting of Jorge Hernández, Hernán Hernández, Eduardo Hernández, Luis Hernández and Óscar Lara.)	Performing "El Corrido de Pedro y Homero"	802-3712	37ABF06	"¡The Fall Guy-Yi-Yi!"
37	Claudia Motta (Note: While she is guest starring in the original English version of this episode, Motta is part of the main cast for the Latin American dub of the show, voicing both Marge and Bart Simpson.)	Mexican Grandmother	802-3712	37ABF06	"¡The Fall Guy-Yi-Yi!"
37	Humberto Velez (Note: While he is guest starring in the original English version of this episode, Velez is part of the main cast for the Latin American dub of the show, voicing Homer Simpson.)	Bumblebee Man; Himself	802-3712	37ABF06	"¡The Fall Guy-Yi-Yi!"
37	Zach Cherry	Farley Lewis	803-3713	37ABF07	"Seperance"
37	Julianne Moore	Consonance	803-3713	37ABF07	"Seperance"
37	Kevin Bacon	Hotel Philadelphia Concierge	804-3714	37ABF08	"Irrational Treasure"
37	Boyz II Men	Perform Opening & Closing Credits	804-3714	37ABF08	"Irrational Treasure"
37	Quinta Brunson	Adrienne Gesstar	804-3714	37ABF08	"Irrational Treasure"
37	Taylor Dearden	Veterinary Intern	804-3714	37ABF08	"Irrational Treasure"
37	Charles Hofer	Philadelphia Eagles Fan	804-3714	37ABF08	"Irrational Treasure"
37	Katherine LaNasa	Veterinary Nurse	804-3714	37ABF08	"Irrational Treasure"
37	Christine Nangle	Museum Security Guard	804-3714	37ABF08	"Irrational Treasure"
37	Questlove (Note: While the entirety of the band The Roots were animated playing music in the episode, only Questlove had any individual lines and was credited.)	Tour Guide; Himself	804-3714	37ABF08	"Irrational Treasure"
37	Noah Wyle	Veterinary Doctor	804-3714	37ABF08	"Irrational Treasure"
37	Michael Stipe (Note: Stipe had previously guest starred in "Homer the Moe" as part of his band R.E.M.)	Himself	805-3715	37ABF05	"Homer? A Cracker Bro?"
37|D+	Betty Gilpin	Amy	806-3716; 807-3717	36ABF20; 36ABF21	"Extreme Makeover: Homer Edition"
37|D+	Jon Hamm	Himself (aka, Cameo)	806-3716; 807-3717	36ABF20; 36ABF21	"Extreme Makeover: Homer Edition"
37|D+	Laufey	Herself	806-3716; 807-3717	36ABF20; 36ABF21	"Extreme Makeover: Homer Edition"
37|D+	Tegan and Sara (Note: Consisting of Tegan Rain Quin and Sara Keirsten Quin)	Sing "Jet Ace!" songs Sing "A Time for Hopeful Hope"	806-3716; 807-3717	36ABF20; 36ABF21	"Extreme Makeover: Homer Edition
37|D+	Patti Harrison	Hailey	809-3719	36ABF22	"Yellow Mirror"
37|D+	Demi Moore	Lydia	809-3719	36ABF22	"Yellow Mirror"
37|D+	Kai Omine	Sideshow Mel Cosplayer	809-3719	36ABF22	"Yellow Mirror"
37|D+	David Silverman	Himself	809-3719	36ABF22	"Yellow Mirror"
38	Colin Jost	Himself	810-3801	37ABF10	"The Children's Book Job"
38	Emma Thompson	Constance Clavinger	810-3801	37ABF10	"The Children's Book Job"
38	Ike Barinholtz	Wayne the Grip	811-3802	37ABF09	"Diary of a Chimpy Kid"
38	Gustavo Dudamel	Himself	812-3803	37ABF13	"Treehouse of Horror Presents: The Revengening"
38	Janina Gavankar	Manjula Nahasapeemapetilon	812-3803	37ABF13	"Treehouse of Horror Presents: The Revengening"
38	Sunil Malhotra	Apu Nahasapeemapetilon	812-3803	37ABF13	"Treehouse of Horror Presents: The Revengening"
38	Tiffany Haddish	Tiffany	813-3804	37ABF14	"Treehouse of Horror XXXVII"
38	Stephanie Ittleson	Additional voices	813-3804	37ABF14	"Treehouse of Horror XXXVII"
38	Jeff Probst	Himself	813-3804	37ABF14	"Treehouse of Horror XXXVII"
38	Rachel Bloom	Annette	814-3805	37ABF12	"Testing 1-2-3"
38	Rosalie Chiang	Hubert Wong	814-3805	37ABF12	"Testing 1-2-3"
38	Jenny Nicholson	KIT-10	815-3806	37ABF11	"The Kosmic Kruiser"
38	Jimmi Simpson	Don Jeffries	815-3806	37ABF11	"The Kosmic Kruiser"
38	Kara Talve	Qu'ee-tar (sings “Space Sensation”)	815-3806	37ABF11	"The Kosmic Kruiser"
38	Eric Bauza	Mr. Fong; Harry Metsali	816-3807	37ABF15	"Dream Scenari-Moe"
38	James Austin Johnson	Dr. Trey De La Mañana	816-3807	37ABF15	"Dream Scenari-Moe"
38	Sunil Malhotra	Apu Nahasapeemapetilon	816-3807	37ABF15	"Dream Scenari-Moe"
38	Meg Ryan	Sam Wheaton	816-3807	37ABF15	"Dream Scenari-Moe"

== Upcoming scheduled guest stars ==
The following have been announced as guest stars for upcoming episodes that have not yet aired. This however is subject to change as sometimes in the past announced guest stars have had their appearances cut for time, been removed or replaced, or for some other reason have not appeared in the final episode.

Season	Guest star	Role(s)	No.	Prod. code	Episode title
38	Andy Cohen	Himself	817-3808	37ABF16	"Curb Your Expectations"
38	Kelsey Grammer	Sideshow Bob	817-3808	37ABF16	"Curb Your Expectations"
38	Kerry Washington	Rayshelle Peyton	817-3808	37ABF16	"Curb Your Expectations"
38	Luka Dončić	Himself	818-3809	37ABF17	"Jersey Score"
38	Ken Jeong	Sensei Arthur	818-3809	37ABF17	"Jersey Score"
38	Henry Winkler	Syd	818-3809	37ABF17	"Jersey Score"
38	Phil Hendrie	?	?	?	?
38	Maurice LaMarche	?	?	?	?
38	Joe Mantegna	Fat Tony	?	?	?
38	Todd Stashwick	Various roles	?	?	?
38	Olivia Wilde	?	?	?	?
38	Owen Wilson	Film Director	?	?	?

Additionally, executive producer Matt Selman stated that he has a part in mind for Larry David for an upcoming episode but has doubts whether he'll accept the offer. Martin Scorsese has also been asked to guest star according to the panel at San Diego Comic Con 2026, but had yet to respond at the time. At the same panel it was commented that Herbert Powell would be returning, but it had not been specified as to whether Danny DeVito was reprising the role.

== Guest stars with multiple appearances ==
The following people have guest starred on the show twice or more.

^{1} Indicates the figure includes an appearance in The Simpsons Movie ^{2} Indicates the figure includes an appearance in the Butterfingers commercials ^{3} Indicates the figure includes an appearance in "Do the Bartman" music video ^{4} Indicates the figure includes an appearance in a The Simpsons Game ^{5} Indicates the figure includes an appearance in "The Simpsons Ride" ^{6} Indicates the figure includes an uncredited appearance ^{7} Indicates the figure dictates appearances as a recurring guest star up until joining the regular supporting cast

Rank	Guest star	Appearances
1st	Marcia Wallace^{12346}	179
2nd	Phil Hartman^{4}	52
3rd	Joe Mantegna^{1}	46
4th	Maurice LaMarche^{4}	32
5th	Kelsey Grammer^{45}	25
6th	Jon Lovitz	22
7th	Frank Welker^{6}	21
8th	Kevin Michael Richardson^{7}	18
9th	Albert Brooks^{1}	12
9th	Glenn Close	12
9th	Jackie Mason	12
12th	Jane Kaczmarek	10
12th	Kipp Lennon	10
14th	Kerry Washington	9
15th	Michael Dees	8
15th	Terry W. Greene	8
15th	Sally Stevens	8
18th	Valerie Harper	7
18th	Renee Ridgeley	7
20th	Dana Gould	6
20th	Jan Hooks	6
20th	Stacy Keach	6
20th	Christine Nangle	6
20th	Michael York	6
25th	Rachel Bloom	5
25th	Ken Burns	5
25th	Matt Groening^{46}	5
25th	Megan Mullally	5
25th	Jay Pharoah	5
25th	J. K. Simmons	5
25th	George Takei	5
32nd	Rosalie Chiang	4
32nd	Michael Carrington	4
32nd	Zooey Deschanel	4
32nd	Danny DeVito	4
32nd	John DiMaggio^{4}	4
32nd	Stephen Hawking	4
32nd	Werner Herzog	4
32nd	Eric Idle	4
32nd	Natasha Lyonne	4
32nd	Charles Napier	4
32nd	Pamela Reed	4
32nd	Sarah Silverman	4
32nd	Kara Talve	4
32nd	Scott Thompson	4
46th	Ike Barinholtz	3
46th	Tony Bennett	3
46th	Gary Coleman	3
46th	Beverly D'Angelo	3
46th	Cole Escola	3
46th	Will Forte	3
46th	Anne Hathaway	3
46th	Pete Holmes	3
46th	James Earl Jones	3
46th	John Kassir	3
46th	Joan Kenley	3
46th	Stan Lee	3
46th	Julia Louis-Dreyfus	3
46th	Gene Merlino	3
46th	David Hyde Pierce	3
46th	Daniel Radcliffe	3
46th	Michael Rapaport	3
46th	Alex Rocco	3
46th	Seth Rogen	3
46th	Paul Rudd	3
46th	Sab Shimono	3
46th	James Sie	3
46th	David Silverman	3
46th	Kiefer Sutherland	3
46th	Ron Taylor	3
46th	Hank Williams Jr.	3
46th	"Weird Al" Yankovic	3

Rank	Guest star	Appearances
73rd	Steve Allen	2
73rd	Trey Anastasio	2
73rd	Fred Armisen	2
73rd	John Autry II	2
73rd	Awkwafina	2
73rd	Baha Men	2
73rd	Alec Baldwin	2
73rd	Drew Barrymore	2
73rd	Mario Batali	2
73rd	Jason Bateman	2
73rd	Kristen Bell	2
73rd	Jim Beanz	2
73rd	Ed Begley Jr.	2
73rd	V. Bozeman	2
73rd	Paul Brittain	2
73rd	Steve Buscemi	2
73rd	David Byrne	2
73rd	Charlean Carmon	2
73rd	Kim Cattrall	2
73rd	Shawn Colvin	2
73rd	David Copperfield	2
73rd	Simon Cowell	2
73rd	Brian Cox	2
73rd	Bryan Cranston	2
73rd	David Crosby	2
73rd	Benedict Cumberbatch	2
73rd	Willem Dafoe	2
73rd	William Daniels	2
73rd	Robin Atkin Downes	2
73rd	Susan Egan	2
73rd	Billy Eichner	2
73rd	R. Lee Ermey	2
73rd	Joe Frazier	2
73rd	Matthew Friend	2
73rd	Neil Gaiman	2
73rd	Janeane Garofalo	2
73rd	Sarah Michelle Gellar	2
73rd	Brian George	2
73rd	Ricky Gervais	2
73rd	Karen Gillan	2
73rd	Jim Gilstrap	2
73rd	Topher Grace	2
73rd	Brian Grazer	2
73rd	Seth Green	2
73rd	Terry Gross	2
73rd	Bill Hader	2
73rd	Jon Hamm	2
73rd	Tom Hanks^{1}	2
73rd	David Herman	2
73rd	Ron Howard	2
73rd	Penn Jillette	2
73rd	Carol Kane^{6}	2
73rd	Michael Keaton	2
73rd	Keegan-Michael Key	2
73rd	Larry King	2
73rd	Sidse Babett Knudsen	2
73rd	Joey Kramer	2
73rd	Denice Kumagai	2
73rd	Phil LaMarr	2
73rd	Jay Leno	2
73rd	James Lipton	2
73rd	John Lithgow	2
73rd	Christopher Lloyd^{5}	2
73rd	Jane Lynch	2

Rank	Guest star	Appearances
73rd	Natalie Maines	2
73rd	Sunil Malhotra	2
73rd	Garry Marshall	2
73rd	Karen Maruyama	2
73rd	Cesar Mazariegos	2
73rd	Michael McKean	2
73rd	Sam McMurray	2
73rd	Cristin Milioti	2
73rd	Tracy Morgan	2
73rd	John Mulaney	2
73rd	Rupert Murdoch	2
73rd	Joe Namath	2
73rd	Leonard Nimoy	2
73rd	Edward Norton	2
73rd	Ted Nugent	2
73rd	NRBQ	2
73rd	Conan O'Brien	2
73rd	Chris O'Dowd	2
73rd	Nick Offerman	2
73rd	Timothy Olyphant	2
73rd	Patton Oswalt	2
73rd	Judith Owen	2
73rd	Chelsea Peretti	2
73rd	Don Pardo	2
73rd	Jessica Paré	2
73rd	Amy Poehler	2
73rd	Natalie Portman	2
73rd	Tito Puente	2
73rd	Thomas Pynchon	2
73rd	Dan Rather	2
73rd	John Ratzenberger	2
73rd	John Roberts	2
73rd	Phil Rosenthal^{1}	2
73rd	Meg Ryan	2
73rd	Susan Sarandon	2
73rd	Kristen Schaal	2
73rd	Mike Scioscia	2
73rd	Andy Serkis	2
73rd	Susie Stevens	2
73rd	Patrick Stewart	2
73rd	Elizabeth Taylor	2
73rd	Teller	2
73rd	Dave Thomas	2
73rd	Destiny Torres	2
73rd	Alex Trebek	2
73rd	Dick Tufeld	2
73rd	Gedde Watanabe	2
73rd	Adam West	2
73rd	Billy West^{4}	2
73rd	Barry White	2
73rd	Betty White	2
73rd	Kristen Wiig	2
73rd	Lona Williams	2
73rd	Marc Wilmore	2
73rd	Paul Winfield	2

== Other media ==
Beyond the television series and the movie, there have been other media products of The Simpsons where guest stars have provided vocal talents in addition to the regular cast. From music videos, to video games, commercials and theme park rides, the following guest stars have appeared in various Simpsons-related media.

Date	Guest star	Role(s)	Media Type	Title
Dec 2, 1990	Marcia Wallace	Edna Krabappel	Music Video	"Do the Bartman" (7F75)
Nov 4, 1992	Oprah Winfrey	Herself	Segment	The Oprah Winfrey Show "Oprah Meets the Simpsons"
1993	Marcia Wallace	Edna Krabappel	Commercial	"Bart's Locker" (Butterfinger)
Sept 5, 1995	Terry Bradshaw	Himself	Special	"Homer and Bart visiting NFL on FOX"
Sept 5, 1995	James Brown	Himself	Special	"Homer and Bart visiting NFL on FOX"
Sept 5, 1995	Jimmy Johnson	Himself	Special	"Homer and Bart visiting NFL on FOX"
Sept 5, 1995	Howie Long	Himself	Special	"Homer and Bart visiting NFL on FOX"
Sept 1, 1997	Phil Hartman	Lionel Hutz; Troy McClure	Video Game	"The Simpsons: Virtual Springfield"
Sept 1, 1997	Marcia Wallace	Edna Krabappel	Video Game	"The Simpsons: Virtual Springfield"
Nov 24, 2001	Marcia Wallace	Edna Krabappel	Video Game	"The Simpsons: Road Rage"
Oct 30, 2007	Vyolet Diaz	Violet	Video Game	"The Simpsons Game"
Oct 30, 2007	John DiMaggio	Bender	Video Game	"The Simpsons Game"
Oct 30, 2007	Kelsey Grammer	Sideshow Bob	Video Game	"The Simpsons Game"
Oct 30, 2007	Matt Groening	Himself	Video Game	"The Simpsons Game"
Oct 30, 2007	Maurice LaMarche	William Shakespeare	Video Game	"The Simpsons Game"
Oct 30, 2007	Marcia Wallace	Edna Krabappel	Video Game	"The Simpsons Game"
Oct 30, 2007	Billy West	Dr. Zoidberg	Video Game	"The Simpsons Game"
Oct 30, 2007	Will Wright	Himself	Video Game	"The Simpsons Game"
May 15, 2008	Kelsey Grammer	Sideshow Bob	Theme Park Ride	"The Simpsons Ride"
May 15, 2008	Christopher Lloyd	Emmett "Doc" Brown	Theme Park Ride	"The Simpsons Ride"
Feb 7, 2010	Maurice LaMarche	News Anchor	Commercial	"Hard Times" Coca-Cola Super Bowl XLIV Commercial
Apr 22, 2012	Zooey Deschanel	Herself	Special	"FOX's 25th Anniversary Special"
Jan 26, 2014	Terry Bradshaw	Himself	Promo	"Simpsons Super Bowl XLVIII Promo"
Jan 26, 2014	Zooey Deschanel	Herself	Promo	"Simpsons Super Bowl XLVIII Promo"
Jan 26, 2014	Jimmy Johnson	Himself	Promo	"Simpsons Super Bowl XLVIII Promo"
Jan 26, 2014	Howie Long	Himself	Promo	"Simpsons Super Bowl XLVIII Promo"
Jan 26, 2014	Curt Menefee	Himself	Promo	"Simpsons Super Bowl XLVIII Promo"
Jan 26, 2014	Michael Strahan	Himself	Promo	"Simpsons Super Bowl XLVIII Promo"
Oct 13, 2016	Jimmy Kimmel	Himself	Segment	Jimmy Kimmel Live! "The Simpsons 600th Episode"
Oct 14, 2018	Kevin Burkhardt	Himself	Promo	"Milhouse visits MLB on Fox"
Oct 14, 2018	David Ortiz	Himself	Promo	"Milhouse visits MLB on Fox"
Oct 14, 2018	Alex Rodriguez	Himself	Promo	"Milhouse visits MLB on Fox"
Oct 14, 2018	Frank Thomas	Himself	Promo	"Milhouse visits MLB on Fox"
Jun 24, 2021	Sona Movsesian	Herself	Special	"Homer Simpson conducts Conan's TBS Exit Interview"
Jun 24, 2021	Conan O'Brien	Himself	Special	"Homer Simpson conducts Conan's TBS Exit Interview"
Jul 7, 2021	Tom Hiddleston	Loki	Short	"The Good, the Bart, and the Loki"
Jul 7, 2021	Maurice LaMarche	Odin	Short	"The Good, the Bart, and the Loki"
Dec 24, 2021	Bad Bunny	Himself	Short / Music Video	"Te Deseo Lo Mejor"
Apr 22, 2022	Sunkrish Bala	Orchestra Member	Short	"When Billie Met Lisa"
Apr 22, 2022	Billie Eilish	Herself	Short	"When Billie Met Lisa"
Apr 22, 2022	Finneas O'Connell	Himself	Short	"When Billie Met Lisa"
Sep 8, 2022	Tom Hiddleston	Loki	Short	"Welcome to the Club"
Dec 15, 2022	Andrea Bocelli	Himself	Short	"The Simpsons Meet the Bocellis in 'Feliz Navidad'"
Dec 15, 2022	Matteo Bocelli	Himself	Short	"The Simpsons Meet the Bocellis in 'Feliz Navidad'"
Dec 15, 2022	Virginia Bocelli	Herself	Short	"The Simpsons Meet the Bocellis in 'Feliz Navidad'"
May 10, 2024	Maurice LaMarche	Darth Vader; Rotta The Huttlett	Short	"May the 12th Be with You"
May 10, 2024	Seth MacFarlane	Stewie Griffin	Short	"May the 12th Be with You"
May 10, 2024	Carolyn Omine	Nani Pelekai	Short	"May the 12th Be with You"
Oct 11, 2024	Kelsey Grammer	Sideshow Bob	Short	"The Most Wonderful Time of the Year"
Oct 11, 2024	Maurice LaMarche	Darth Vader; Amos Slade; Thanos	Short	"The Most Wonderful Time of the Year"
Dec 9, 2024	Drew Carter	Himself	Special	"The Simpsons Funday Football"
Dec 9, 2024	Mina Kimes	Herself	Special	"The Simpsons Funday Football"
Dec 9, 2024	Eli Manning	Himself	Special	"The Simpsons Funday Football"
Dec 9, 2024	Peyton Manning	Himself	Special	"The Simpsons Funday Football"
Dec 9, 2024	Dan Orlovsky	Himself	Special	"The Simpsons Funday Football"
Dec 9, 2024	Steven A. Smith	Himself	Special	"The Simpsons Funday Football"
Dec 9, 2024	Scott Van Pelt	Himself	Special	"The Simpsons Funday Football"
Nov 1, 2025	Troy Baker	Jonesy	Short	"Fortnite ǀ The Simpsons Short 1: Apocalypse D'oh"
Nov 1, 2025	Suzie Yeung	Hope	Short	"Fortnite ǀ The Simpsons Short 1: Apocalypse D'oh"
Nov 18, 2025	Suzie Yeung	Hope	Short	"Fortnite ǀ The Simpsons Short 3: Multiplidiocy"
Nov 24, 2025	Troy Baker	Jonesy	Short	"Fortnite ǀ The Simpsons Short 4: The Incredible Bulk"
Nov 24, 2025	Suzie Yeung	Hope	Short	"Fortnite ǀ The Simpsons Short 4: The Incredible Bulk"
Jun 3, 2026	Will Ferrell	Mr. Monopoly	Short	"Mr. Burns and Mr. Monopoly's Excellent Rivalry"

== Guest animators ==
The show has also had several guest animators who will do their own version of the show's opening credits, from just a couch gag to the whole introduction. Starting from the 22nd season, these following guest animators have contributed to the show:

Season	Guest animator	Production	No.	Prod. code	Episode title
22	Banksy	Banksy couch gag	467–2203	MABF18	"MoneyBART"
23	John Kricfalusi	John K. couch gag	488–2302	NABF17	"Bart Stops to Smell the Roosevelts"
23	Bill Plympton	Plymptoons couch gag	504–2318	PABF11	"Beware My Cheating Bart"
24	Bill Plympton	Noir couch gag	523–2415	RABF09	"Black Eyed, Please"
24	Stoopid Buddy Stoodios	Robot Chicken couch gag	528–2420	RABF12	"The Fabulous Faker Boy"
25	Guillermo del Toro (concept)	Guillermo del Toro opening sequence	532–2502	RABF16	"Treehouse of Horror XXIV"
25	Bill Plympton	Channel Changer couch gag	540–2510	SABF03	"Married to the Blob"
25	Sylvain Chomet	Sylvain Chromet couch gag	542–2512	SABF08	"Diggs"
25	Michał Socha	Homer's Brain couch gag	549–2519	SABF14	"What to Expect When Bart's Expecting"
26	Don Hertzfeldt	The Simpsons Travel to the Future (aka, The Sampsans) couch gag	553–2601	SABF20	"Clown in the Dumps"
26	Paul Robertson and Ivan Dixon	Simpsons Pixel couch gag	566–2614	TABF07	"My Fare Lady"
26	Justin Roiland and Dan Harmon	Rick and Morty couch gag	574–2622	TABF16	"Mathlete's Feat"
27	John Kricfalusi	The Couch Gag couch gag	579–2705	TABF18	"Treehouse of Horror XXVI"
27	Steve Cutts	LA-Z Rider couch gag	585–2711	VABF04	"Teenage Mutant Milk-Caused Hurdles"
27	Bill Plympton	Roomance couch gag	589–2715	VABF08	"Lisa the Veterinarian"
27	Eric Goldberg	Disney couch gag	593–2719	VABF12	"Fland Canyon"
27	Michał Socha	Build Your Own Couch Gag	596–2722	VABF15	"Orange Is the New Yellow"
28	Stoopid Buddy Stoodios	Robot Chicken couch gag (#2)	611–2815	WABF08	"The Cad and the Hat"
28	Bill Plympton	The Artiste couch gag	613–2817	WABF10	"22 for 30"
29	Bill Plympton	Homer's Face couch gag	631–2913	XABF06	"3 Scenes Plus a Tag from a Marriage"
30	Bernard Derriman and Bento Box Entertainment	Bob's Burgers couch gag	642–3003	XABF17	"My Way or the Highway to Heaven"
31	Michał Socha and Ron Diamond	The Extremesons couch gag	680–3118	YABF13	"The Incredible Lightness of Being a Baby"
32	Bill Plympton	Homer's Family couch gag	700–3216	QABF09	"Manger Things"
32 33	Janine Widget and Katrin von Niederhäusern	Swiss Pocket Knife couch gag	702–3218; 714–3308	QABF11; UABF01	"Burger Kings" "Portrait of a Lackey on Fire"
33	Stoopid Buddy Stoodios	"All Hail Princess Maggie" couch gag	710–3304	QABF19	"The Wayz We Were"
33	SpikerMonster (aka, Mr. Spike R. Monster)	SpikerMonster couch gag	728–3322	UABF14	"Poorhouse Rock"
34	Janine Widget and Katrin von Niederhäusern	No Connection couch gag	729–3401	UABF16	"Habeas Tortoise"
34	Bill Plympton	The Rug couch gag	730–3402	UABF19	"One Angry Lisa"
34	Jacob's Food Diaries	Simpsons Culinary couch gag	735–3407	OABF01	"From Beer to Paternity"
34	Stoopid Buddy Stoodios	Part of the Couch couch gag	741–3413	OABF06	"The Many Saints of Springfield"
35	Janine Widget and Katrin von Niederhäusern	Thanksgiving Turkey Hand couch gag	757–3507	OABF19	"It's a Blunderful Life"
36	Jorge R. Gutierrez	Cottage of Terror	773-3605	35ABF13	"Treehouse of Horror XXXV"
37	Ward Sutton	America the Beautiful opening	793-3703	36ABF15	"Treehouse of Horror XXXVI"
37	Meow Wolf	Otto Wolf couch gag	806-3716	36ABF20	"Extreme Makeover: Homer Edition"
38	Stoopid Buddy Studios	The Nightmare Before Christmas homage opening	813-3804	37ABF14	"Treehouse of Horror XXXVII"

== Potential guest stars ==
Season	Guest star	Role(s)	No.	Prod. code	Episode title
1	James Earl Jones	Sideshow Bob	012–112	7G12	"Krusty Gets Busted"
Notes: Jones was the original choice for the role of Sideshow Bob, until producers decided on Kelsey Grammer instead. Jones would go on to guest voice several times on the show still, starting in the very next season.
2	Ron Taylor	Bleeding Gums Murphy	018–205	7F05	"Dancin' Homer"
Notes: Taylor was originally going to reprise the role of Bleeding Gums Murphy from "Moaning Lisa", but could not record the part because he was in New York at the time, so Daryl Coley took over for him.
2	William Shatner Bruce Springsteen	Themselves	024–211	7F11	"One Fish, Two Fish, Blowfish, Blue Fish"
Notes: Larry King's role was originally intended for Shatner and Springsteen, but both rejected the offer. Shatner turned the offer down because he thought the producers were going to make fun of his speech patterns.
3	George Takei	Akira	038–303	7F23	"When Flanders Failed"
Notes: Scheduling conflicts stopped Takei from reprising his role as Akira from "One Fish, Two Fish, Blowfish, Blue Fish" so cast member Hank Azaria did an impression of Takei. While Takei would appear in other roles following this, Azaria would then continue to voice Akira for most of the series from then on, until Takei would reprise the role over 20 years later in "What Animated Women Want".
3	Sheldon Leonard	Fat Tony	039–304	8F03	"Bart the Murderer"
Notes: Originally the producers wanted Leonard, but he turned down the role of Fat Tony that would go to Joe Mantegna.
3	Catherine O'Hara	Collette the Waitress	045–310	8F08	"Flaming Moe's"
Notes: O'Hara recorded all her lines for Collette, but the producers felt that her voice did not suit the character so used supporting cast member Jo Ann Harris' temp track instead, whereby Harris had done an impression of Shelley Long's character of Diane Chambers from Cheers. O'Hara was still credited at the end of the episode despite all of her dialogue being replaced.
3	Bruce Springsteen	Himself	048–313	8F11	"Radio Bart"
Notes: Springsteen rejected the show for the second time with his part going to Sting instead.
3	Carlton Fisk Rickey Henderson Nolan Ryan Ryne Sandberg	Themselves	052–317	8F13	"Homer at the Bat"
Notes: These were some of the known baseball stars approached to guest star, only to turn the offer down.
3	Marcia Wallace	Edna Krabappel	052–317	8F13	"Homer at the Bat"
Notes: Originally guest star José Canseco was slated to wake up in bed with Edna and miss the game in a parody of Bull Durham, but Canseco's then-wife, Esther Haddad, objected. Edna's part was cut but Wallace had still recorded dialogue and was still credited at the end of the episode.
4	Don Rickles	Himself	067–408	9F06	"New Kid on the Block"
Notes: The episode's original subplot was intended to include Rickles presenting a comedy show and Homer laughing excessively at his jokes, until Rickles ridicules him. The pair were intended to start fighting and end up having to go to court. Despite production staff being sure that Rickles would appear in the episode, he was reportedly upset by the concept of the storyline, as he did not wish to be portrayed as a "mean guy". When attending a Fox Broadcasting Company publicity event in New York City with Rupert Murdoch, creator Matt Groening was introduced by Murdoch to Rickles. Rickles began shouting at Groening, accusing him of spying on his Las Vegas act and using material from that for the episode. The cast actually had been receiving recordings from Rickles from the 1950s to use as ideas on how to get the style for his animatic portrayal.
4	William Shatner George Takei	Themselves	071–412	9F10	"Marge vs. the Monorail"
Notes: Both Star Trek actors turned down the role that went to Leonard Nimoy. Shatner turned down the show for the second time, while Takei only rejected the part because he did not want to make fun of public transportation as he was a member of the board of directors of the Southern California Rapid Transit District (now the Los Angeles County Metropolitan Transportation Authority). Producers had originally skipped asking Nimoy assuming he would turn the part down, only to be pleasantly surprised when he accepted.
4	Tom Cruise	Tom	073–414	9F12	"Brother from the Same Planet"
Notes: The producers wrote the part of Tom for Cruise having been informed the actor was interested in guest starring, only for him to reject the part when offered. The role was offered to recurring guest Phil Hartman instead.
4	Clint Eastwood Anthony Hopkins Anthony Perkins	Dr. Wolfe	076–417	9F15	"Last Exit to Springfield"
Notes: Both Eastwood and Hopkins turned down the role of Dr. Wolfe when offered. Perkins agreed to voice him but died before he could record any lines. The part went to cast member Hank Azaria instead.
4	O. J. Simpson	Himself	076–417	9F15	"Last Exit to Springfield"
Notes: Simpson was originally wanted for the guest panelist on Smartline, but he turned down the part that would go to Dr. Joyce Brothers instead. Producers later stated they were happy it turned out this way given the controversy that would later surround Simpson.
4	Jon Lovitz	Artie Ziff	078–419	9F16	"The Front"
Notes: Scheduling conflicts prevented Lovitz from being able to reprise his role of Artie Ziff from "The Way We Was" and Dan Castellaneta filled in the role. Lovitz would go on to voice Ziff in the future.
4	Alex Rocco	Roger Meyers Jr.	078–419	9F16	"The Front"
Notes: Scheduling conflicts prevented Rocco from being able to reprise his role of Roger Meyers. Jr. from "Itchy & Scratchy & Marge" and Hank Azaria filled in the role. Azaria would continue to voice the character for the next few seasons, though Rocco did return to the role twice more.
4	Jimmy Carter Gerald Ford Wynonna Judd Richard Nixon Ronald Reagan The Rolling Stones	Themselves	081–422	9F19	"Krusty Gets Kancelled"
Notes: All of these celebrities were approached to guest star as themselves, but all turned down the offer. Mick Jagger and Keith Richards of The Rolling Stones would later accept guest spots years later in "How I Spent My Strummer Vacation" and their role went to the Red Hot Chili Peppers. Of the then-living ex-President of the United States offered parts only Reagan actually responded.
4	Prince	Leon Kompowsky	?	?	Unproduced sequel to "Stark Raving Dad"
Notes: A planned follow-up to "Stark Raving Dad", the plot focused on Michael Jackson impersonator Leon Kompowsky returning to Springfield claiming to be the pop star Prince. The script was written by freelancers and polished by Conan O'Brien. According to executive producer Mike Reiss it saw Kompowsky encourage the Springfield residents to "loosen up, become more flamboyant and become more sexually open". Prince originally agreed to voice Kompowsky, but the writers discovered that Prince was referring to a different script entirely written by a friend of his. Prince disliked their script and demanded the other one be used, but the writers refused and the episode was never produced.
4	Frank Zappa	Himself	?	?	?
Notes: Matt Groening and Zappa were friends and mutual fans of each other's work. Zappa had agreed to a guest spot on the show sometime around season 4, but became ill and died before he could record a part.
5	Phil Hartman	Lionel Hutz	091–510	1F08	"$pringfield (Or, How I Learned to Stop Worrying and Love Legalized Gambling)"
Notes: A scene involving Hartman as Lionel Hutz was cut for time. The scene was released as a deleted scene on the DVD set The Simpsons: The Complete Fifth Season.
5	Marvelous Marvin Hagler Wayne Newton Sylvester Stallone Arnold Schwarzenegger Bruce Willis	Themselves	091–510	1F08	"$pringfield (Or, How I Learned to Stop Worrying and Love Legalized Gambling)"
Notes: Hagler was the original choice for Gerry Cooney's role while Newton was the original pick for Robert Goulet's, but both rejected the offer. There was a brief period when the episode had a different subplot that revolved around the restaurant chain Planet Hollywood. Matt Groening had been told by a spokesperson that if he put Planet Hollywood in The Simpsons, Stallone, Schwarzenegger, and Willis, would agree to make guest appearances on the show. The writers of were excited about this so they wrote a new subplot for the episode that featured Planet Hollywood and the three actors. However, for unknown reasons, they were unable to appear in the episode.
5	Michael Caine	Himself	094–513	1F10	"Homer and Apu"
Notes: Caine was the original choice wanted for James Woods' part, but he turned down the offer. It's possible that producers also wanted Caine to voice himself in "Burns' Heir" that was produced around the same time and only aired five episodes later where Dan Castellaneta did an impression of Caine, but this has not been confirmed.
5	Richard Simmons	Robotic Richard Simmons	099–518	1F16	"Burns' Heir"
Notes: Simmons was interested in a guest spot but rejected the part when he learned he was going to be a robot. The scene was cut from the episode, but a version where the robot was voiced by Dan Castellaneta was shown as a deleted scene in "The Simpsons 138th Episode Spectacular".
6	Al Gore	Himself	109–606	2F03	"Treehouse of Horror V"
Notes: According to Bill Oakley, the then-Vice President Gore was asked to host the Halloween special in season 6 or 7.
6	Wayne Gretzky Bobby Orr	Themselves	111–608	2F05	"Lisa on Ice"
Notes: According to writer Mike Scully the original draft of the episode featured cameos from the two ice hockey legends, but they were ultimately cut because they had such a good family story. Gretzky would eventually guest star in the episode "The Nightmare After Krustmas" more than 20 years later.
7	Faye Dunaway	Herself	135–707	3F05	"King-Size Homer"
Notes: Dunaway originally agreed to voice herself in the movie Honk If You're Horny that Homer went to see in the episode, but canceled.
7	David Brinkley	Himself	146–718	3F16	"The Day the Violence Died"
Notes: The producers were unable to get Brinkley to play his part, so he was instead voiced by Harry Shearer.
7	William Hickey	Chester J. Lampwick	146–718	3F16	"The Day the Violence Died"
Notes: Hickey was the first choice to voice Chester instead of Kirk Douglas, but he rejected the offer.
7	Bob Dylan Bruce Springsteen Neil Young Hole Pearl Jam	Themselves	152–724	3F21	"Homerpalooza"
Notes: These musicians were asked to take part in the episode, but declined. While Sonic Youth did appear in the episode, according to producers they would have refused to have Courtney Love (of Hole) accepted.
8	Shirley Bassey	Sings "Scorpio"	155–802	3F23	"You Only Move Twice"
Notes: The producers wanted James Bond theme vocalist Bassey to sing the theme for Scoprio, but could not get her so Sally Stevens provided the vocals instead.
8	Don King	Himself	156–803	4F03	"The Homer They Fall"
Notes: King was approached to play himself but declined, so parody character Lucius Sweet replaced him voiced by Paul Winfield.
8	Sheryl Crow	To sing "Can I Borrow a Feeling?"	159–806	4F04	"A Milhouse Divided"
Notes: Crow was asked to sing Kirk Van Houten's song over the closing credits, but rejected the offer.
8	Bob Dylan Wallace Shawn	Coyote	162–809	3F24	"El Viaje Misterioso de Nuestro Jomer (The Mysterious Voyage of Homer)"
Notes: Dylan was a potential choice for the voice of the Coyote instead of Johnny Cash, despite having recently rejected the show before. Shawn was another potential candidate according to Bill Oakley, though he would later guest star more than 20 years later as Wallace the Hernia in "I Want You (She's So Heavy)"
8	Julie Andrews	Shary Bobbins	166–813	3G03	"Simpsoncalifragilisticexpiala(Annoyed Grunt)cious"
Notes: The Mary Poppins actress was originally touted to play her parody, but Maggie Roswell did such a good job for the temp read that the producers decided to keep it.
8	Quentin Tarantino	Himself	166–813	3G03	"Simpsoncalifragilisticexpiala(Annoyed Grunt)cious"
Notes: Tarantino originally agreed to play himself, but did not agree with the lines he was given and backed out. Dan Castellaneta impersonated him.
8	John Turturro	Mr. Mitchell	173–820	4F16	"The Canine Mutiny"
Notes: Turturro recorded Mr. Mitchell's dialogue, but when he refused to come in again for some re-takes his audio was cut and Dan Castellaneta re-voiced the character.
8	Nicolas Cage William H. Macy Steve Martin	Frank Grimes	176–823	4F19	"Homer's Enemy"
Notes: Martin was the original choice for the part of Frank Grimes, but he turned down the offer. He did accept the role of Ray Patterson the very next season in "Trash of the Titans" however. The role went to Hank Azaria, who based his performance of the character on Macy specifically and thought that Macy should have done it. After his performance at the table reads however the producers decided to keep Azaria as the voice. Macy would eventually guest star in the episode "Homer's Paternity Coot". Cage was also another consideration until Azara's performance sealed the deal.
9	Marv Albert	Himself	184–906	5F03	"Bart Star"
Notes: Albert was originally going to play Roy Firestone's part as a sports radio host, but was dropped following sexual assault charges that were made against him around the time the episode was in pre-production. Albert would later appear in the episode "The Burns and the Bees".
9	David Letterman Jerry Seinfeld Garry Shandling	Themselves	193–915	5F10	"The Last Temptation of Krust"
Notes: These comedians were other options for Jay Leno's role in the episode, with character designs even done for Shandling. Leno was the first one to commit to the episode. Letterman would later guest star in a couch gag for "The D'oh-cial Network"
10	Phil Hartman	Troy McClure	207–1004	AABF01	"Treehouse of Horror IX"
Notes: Troy McClure was supposed to host The World's Deadliest Executions instead of Ed McMahon, but after Hartman's tragic murder the producers decided to replace the part out of respect.
10	Bruce Springsteen Tom Cruise and Nicole Kidman Kurt Russell and Goldie Hawn Bruce Willis and Demi Moore	Themselves	208–1005	5F19	"When You Dish Upon a Star"
Notes: These celebrities were all offered the parts that would go to Alec Baldwin and Kim Basinger but turned down the producers. Despite turning down the show multiple times in the past, Springsteen was originally pitched as a solo celebrity visitor and when he rejected the offer it was changed to a celebrity couple.. Moore would go on to voice the Marge doppelganger Lydia over two decades later in the episode "Yellow Mirror"
10	Rod Stewart	Himself	217–1014	AABF11	"I'm with Cupid"
Notes: In early versions of the script Stewart is the musician that comes to Springfield instead of Elton John.
10	Howard Stern	Himself	224–1021	AABF17	"Monty Can't Buy Me Love"
Notes: Stern declined to voice himself, so parody character Jerry Rude was created instead and voiced by Michael McKean for his second guest stint on the show.
11	Debbie Reynolds Shirley Temple	Vicki Valentine	246–1120	BABF15	"Last Tap Dance in Springfield"
Notes: Producers had originally wanted Temple to play parody character Vicki Valentine, but she was unable to record the role. Reynolds was then offered the role too but never responded, leaving Tress MacNeille to voice Vicki instead.
11	Drew Barrymore	Becky	247–1121	BABF18	"It's a Mad, Mad, Mad, Mad Marge"
Notes: When the staff learned that Barrymore wanted a part in an episode they wrote several scripts that might suit her. When she was offered the role of Becky or Krusty's daughter Sophie in "Insane Clown Poppy" she chose the latter and guest star Parker Posey voiced Becky instead.
11	Bret Michaels	Cyanide Lead Singer	247–1121	BABF18	"It's a Mad, Mad, Mad, Mad Marge"
Notes: Michaels turned down the chance to be the lead singer of Poison tribute band Cyanide.
11	Kenny Rogers	Himself	248–1122	BABF19	"Behind the Laughter"
Notes: Rogers was the original choice for Willie Nelson's part. Rogers even made the writers rewrite the script to remove references to Kenny Rogers Roasters as a condition and when they did still declined.
12	Christopher Walken	Himself	251–1203	BABF17	"Insane Clown Poppy"
Notes: Reports of the nature of Walken not voicing himself after originally agreeing vary, from scheduling conflicts to asking for more money than the producers were willing to pay. Comedian Jay Mohr guest starred instead, doing an impersonation of Walken.
12	Robby Krieger	Himself	255–1207	CABF03	"The Great Money Caper"
Notes: Krieger of The Doors had been promised a guest role on the show after the staff were allowed to use the Doors song "The End" for the episode "Hello Gutter, Hello Fadder". However, during production, executive producer Mike Scully thought that the scene stood out too much and that Krieger's cameo felt "too obviously shoe-horned in," so the scene ended up being cut from the episode. The scene was later included in The Simpsons: The Complete Twelfth Season DVD set.
12	Ron Howard	Himself	268–1220	CABF16	"Children of a Lesser Clod"
Notes: Originally the third act was about the kids taking part in a film directed by Howard for what would have been his third appearance in the show, but it was changed. This is also reflected by the episode originally being titled "The Kids Stay in the Picture" instead. The producers also wanted a famous NBA player to appear in the episode, but none accepted the offer.
12	Jim Carrey	Hobo	269–1221	CABF17	"Simpsons Tall Tales"
Notes: Carrey had agreed to play the singing Hobo, but had to drop out due to time constraints. Hank Azaria did the voice instead.
13	Sean Connery Lyle Lovett Gary Oldman	Ultrahouse's celebrity voice	270–1301	CABF19	"Treehouse of Horror XII"
Notes: All of these actors were under consideration for the role that went to Pierce Brosnan, with Connery the original choice.
13	George Lucas	Himself	287–1318	DABF13	"I Am Furious (Yellow)"
Notes: Producers originally wanted Lucas to hang around in the Android's Dungeon instead of Stan Lee, but after initially being interested Lucas rejected the role after reading the script when he thought the writers were making too much fun of him and the Star Wars Prequel Trilogy.
13	Michael Clarke Duncan	John Coffey-like Prisoner	290–1321	DABF16	"The Frying Game"
Notes: While recording lines for the episode, the staff were told that Duncan was visiting the Fox studios. Having not recorded the lines for the character yet, the staff asked Duncan if he wanted to voice the parody of his role from The Green Mile, but he declined. The role went to Hank Azaria and became a recurring character voiced by both Azaria and Kevin Michael Richardson.
14	Tom Brokaw	Himself	294–1403	DABF20	"Bart vs. Lisa vs. the Third Grade"
Notes: Brokaw declined the offer to voice himself only because he loved Harry Shearer's impression of him so much he preferred to hear it instead.
14	Harvey Fierstein	Karl	308–1417	EABF12	"Three Gays of the Condo"
Notes: Fierstein was originally asked to reprise his role as Karl from the episode "Simpson and Delilah" in a cameo appearance. In the script, Homer was thrown out of the house by Marge, and encountered Karl. The purpose of the appearance was to introduce a gay couple that Homer would live with. Fierstein however felt that "the script was a lot of very clever gay jokes, and there just wasn't that Simpsons twist" and turned the role down.
14	Jon Bon Jovi	Himself	311–1420	EABF15	"Brake My Wife, Please"
Notes: Bon Jovi was the original choice for Jackson Browne's part. The musician had apparently been keen to guest star, but he did not like the script, specifically a dig at his latest album and a scene where he was going to be covered in spaghetti.
15	David Beckham and Victoria Beckham David Bowie Morrissey Rowan Williams	Themselves	317–1504	EABF22	"The Regina Monologues"
Notes: All were potential English celebrities considered for the episode. The Beckhams were scripted to be seen bickering on the street, but were dropped when Tony Blair agreed to appear and it was deemed that they were not famous enough in the United States and so were not approached. Archbishop of Canterbury Williams was a fan of the show and included in a draft of the script acting as a tour guide and showing some of his relatives around London, but Williams had to reject the part due to other engagements. The producers wanted an English musician for a part and approached Bowie and Morrissey but could not sync up a time to record them so the part was dropped.
15	Robert Stack	Himself	325–1512	FABF07	"Milhouse Doesn't Live Here Anymore"
Notes: Stack was the original host of the episode instead of Isabel Sanford and even recorded his part, but he died before the episode aired and out of respect the producers recast the part.
16	Christina Aguilera	Clarissa Wellington	353–1618	GABF13	"A Star Is Torn"
Notes: Aguilera turned down the role that went to Fantasia Barrino, but not before advertising in the media that she was appearing.
16	Joe Mantegna	Fat Tony	356–1621	GABF09	"The Father, the Son, and the Holy Guest Star"
Notes: Mantegna was touted as playing Fat Tony in listings for the episode, but did not appear in the final broadcast.
18	James Gandolfini	Dante Calabresis	379–1801	HABF15	"The Mook, the Chef, the Wife and Her Homer"
Notes: Producers wanted Gandolfini to play Dante, and while The Sopranos actor was a fan of the show he turned down the role because he did not want to play "a hood" again. Joe Pantoliano guest starred in the role instead.
18	Kurt Vonnegut	Himself	384–1806	HABF19	"Moe'N'a Lisa"
Notes: Gore Vidal's part was originally written for Vonnegut, who turned the offer.
18	George Clooney	First Mate Billy	388–1810	JABF03	"The Wife Aquatic"
Notes: Clooney turned down a chance to play a parody of his character from The Perfect Storm and it ended up going to recurring guest star Maurice LaMarche instead.
18	Harry Hamlin Peter Wolf	Themselves	394–1816	JABF06	"Homerazzi"
Notes: Both were touted as guest starring in listings for the episode, but did not appear in the final broadcast.
18	Ronaldinho	Himself	395–1817	JABF10	"Marge Gamer"
Notes: Ronaldo almost fell through, so he was their backup choice had that happened.
Movie	Erin Brockovich Johnny Knoxville	Themselves	M1	—	The Simpsons Movie
Notes: Brockovich's part was cut for time and pacing. According to Mike Scully in an interview, Knoxville was a potential replacement for Tom Hanks. This however may have been a joke on Scully's part given the context.
Movie	Minnie Driver	Grievance Counselor	M1	—	The Simpsons Movie
Notes: The whole subplot of Driver's character helping Bart get through the humiliation after the fallout of his dare with Homer was cut as the producers felt it harmed the pacing of the movie.
Movie	Isla Fisher	Doomsday Consultant	M1	—	The Simpsons Movie
Notes: Fisher's character and scene were cut for undisclosed reasons. Animator Derek Thompson later uploaded some of Fisher's part on Vimeo, which was initially part of an animation demo reel.
Movie	Kelsey Grammer	Sideshow Bob	M1	—	The Simpsons Movie
Notes: Sideshow Bob had a small cameo holding a "KILL BART" sign amongst the mob who otherwise wanted Homer dead, but it was cut from the movie.
Movie	Edward Norton	Panicky Man	M1	—	The Simpsons Movie
Notes: Norton's part was redubbed by Dan Castellaneta because the producers felt the Woody Allen impersonation that Norton did for the character was too distracting.
Movie	Dave Stewart	Singing Alaska song	M1	—	The Simpsons Movie
Notes: The Eurythmics singer recorded a song about Alaska for the movie, but the whole song ended up being cut for pacing.
19	Brian Williams	Himself	410–1910	KABF03	"E Pluribus Wiggum"
Notes: Williams was the first choice for Dan Rather's part, but he turned down the offer.
20	Matt Damon	Himself	422–2002	KABF15	"Lost Verizon"
Notes: According to early reports instead of Denis Leary it was Damon's phone that fell into Bart's hands instead. Whether Damon refused or backed out due to scheduling conflicts or another reason is unknown.
20	Kenneth Branagh	Tom O'Flanagan	434–2014	LABF11	"In the Name of the Grandfather"
Notes: Originally Branagh was touted as the voice of Tom instead of Colm Meaney. Why he was replaced was unknown, but according to Al Jean he recorded his parts.
20	Kathy Ireland	Herself	434–2014	LABF11	"In the Name of the Grandfather"
Notes: Ireland was touted as playing herself in listings for the episode. However, although she appeared in animated form in the episode, a caption stated that the producers asked her to guest voice and that she had declined. Tress MacNeille provided her vocals instead.
21	Michelle Obama	Herself	456–2115	MABF07	"Stealing First Base"
Notes: Obama declined an offer to voice herself, so guest star Angela Bassett did an impression of her instead.
22	Jackie Mason	Rabbi Hyman Krustofsky	479–2215	NABF08	"The Scorpion's Tale"
Notes: Mason was touted as reprising his role as Krusty's father in listings for the episode, but did not appear in the final broadcast.
24	Jackie Mason	Rabbi Hyman Krustofsky	530–2422	RABF17	"Dangers on a Train"
Notes: Mason was going to reprise his role as Krusty's father singing a single line in a song, but his part was cut for time.
25	Christiane Amanpour Gordon Ramsay Aaron Sorkin	Themselves	533–2503	RABF18	"Four Regrettings and a Funeral"
Notes: These television personalities were all touted as appearing in the episode, but did not appear in the final broadcast. Amanpour would later go on to voice herself a decade later in the Season 35 episode "Thirst Trap: A Corporate Love Story"
25	Jack Black	Milo	540–2510	SABF03	"Married to the Blob"
Notes: When Black originally voiced Milo in the episode "Husbands and Knives" the producers had to call the actor back in to learn and sing "What's New Pussycat?" in Korean after the song "Goldfinger" (that he had originally also learned and recorded in Korean for them) was not allowed to be used on copyright grounds. According to Matt Selman after the trouble they had put him through they felt bad and could not bring themselves to get him back again, so the character of Milo was instead performed by Maurice LaMarche.
26	Joe Mantegna	Fat Tony	567–2615	TABF08	"The Princess Guide"
Notes: Mantegna was touted as reprising his role as Fat Tony in listings for the episode, but did not appear in the final broadcast.
28	Joe Mantegna	Fat Tony	602–2806	VABF22	"There Will Be Buds"
Notes: Mantegna was touted as reprising his role as Fat Tony in listings for the episode, but did not appear in the final broadcast.
28	Drew Barrymore	Sophie Krustofsky	606–2810	WABF02	"The Nightmare After Krustmas"
Notes: Barrymore was apparently not interested in returning to the role of Krusty's daughter she originated in "Insane Clown Poppy" so was replaced by Natasha Lyonne for this episode and subsequent appearances as well. Barrymore would however return to voice herself in the Season 34 episode "The King of Nice".
29	George Takei	Himself	628–2910	XABF03	"Haw-Haw Land"
Notes: Takei was touted as guest starring in listings for the episode, but did not appear in the final broadcast.
30	Daniel Day-Lewis	Himself playing Sideshow Daniel Day-Lewis	657–3018	YABF10	"Bart vs. Itchy & Scratchy"
Notes: A scene that never made it into the final broadcast would have featured Day-Lewis playing a Sideshow version of himself. He passed and the scene was cut, but there was an animatic of the scene released online by Matt Selman.
31	Werner Herzog	Walter Hotenhoffer	670–3108	YABF17	"Thanksgiving of Horror"
Notes: Herzog was touted as guest starring in what would be his third appearance as Walter Hotenhoffer in listings for the episode, but did not appear in the final broadcast. Herzog would appear later in the season as Dr. Lund in the episode "Screenless".
32	Bill Simmons	Himself	690–3206	ZABF22	"Podcast News"
Notes: Simmons was touted as guest starring in listings for the episode, but did not appear in the final broadcast.
32	Larry David	Golf-loving Rabbi	697–3213	QABF06	"Wad Goals"
Notes: The producers wanted David for the role but when the COVID-19 pandemic hit they decided not to bother him.
33	Renee Ridgeley	Dr. Wendy Sage	724–3318	UABF11	"My Octopus and a Teacher"
Notes: Ridgeley was noted as returning to the role of Dr. Sage in this episode but never appeared in the final broadcast.
34	Stephen King	Magical Gravedigger	733–3405	UABF17	"Not It"
Notes: The famous author was asked to make what would have been a second guest stint in this episode parodying of his own novel It as a magical gravedigger, but he declined.
35	Peter Capaldi	Unknown Role	758–3508	35ABF02	"Ae Bonny Romance"
Notes: According to writer Michael Price a part was offered to the Scottish actor known for playing the Twelfth Doctor, but he was unavailable and had to decline.
36	Barack Obama	Himself	769–3601	35ABF15	"Bart's Birthday"
Notes: According to co-showrunner Michael Price a part was written for the former President of the United States where different celebrities did tributes to the show and Obama would compare the show to being the president, stating that you begin with eight great years then a lot of bad stuff follows. Obama's representatives passed because he was busy with work related to the 2024 United States presidential election.
36	Mads Mikkelsen	Wilhelm von Wonthelm	788-3620	36ABF09	"Stew Lies"
Notes: Mikkelsen was touted as voicing Wilhelm von Wonthelm leading up to this episode, but for unknown reasons recurring guest star Maurice LaMarche performed the role in the final episode instead.
37	Megan Mullally	Sarah Wiggum	801-3711	37ABF03	"Parahormonal Activity"
Notes: Sarah Wiggum was originally supposed to have a single line in this episode, but Mullally was unavailable to record the part so the line was given to Bernice Hibbert instead. However in the original broadcast the animation of Sarah Wiggum was still used with Bernice's voice by accident and Mullally was still credited in the end credits. In subsequent airings the correct replacement animation of Bernice Hibbert was inserted instead.
Unknown episodes:
Rejected parts: Kathy Bates, George H. W. Bush, George W. Bush, Bill Clinton, Chris Hemsworth, Liam Hemsworth, Luke Hemsworth, Barack Obama, Gregory Peck, Smokey Robinson, Bernie Sanders and Tiger Woods. Rejected but accepted later: Martin Short rejected a role early in the show's history, but did agree to play Guthrie Frenel later in the episode "Springfield Splendor". Hugh Jackman rejected an unknown role initially, but later agreed to play the Janitor in the episode "Poorhouse Rock"; Rejected by producers: Donald Trump; Other: In Nancy Cartwright's podcast Simpsons Declassified she said “Did you know, Robin Williams, he was a fan and he was a friend of The Simpsons. And I was told that he almost voiced a character on our show before he was cast as the Genie… We never had him and I think they wanted to cast him, but then he got the Genie and we missed out on him.”; Robert De Niro was wanted for a part during Bill Oakley and Josh Weinstein's tenure as showrunners (season 7 and 8) but they never found a role to suit him.; While discussing successfully getting Michael Palin for a guest appearance for Season 32 at the Comic-Con@Home 2020 panel, Al Jean mentioned another member of Monty Python had turned them down. While not named it is implied this was likely John Cleese.; In 2021 the staff stated that they had written a part in mind for Dwayne "The Rock" Johnson, but nothing seemed to have come from it. Yeardley Smith had stated several times that he had been a dream guest star of hers.
