= Cremains of the Day (disambiguation) =

Cremains of the Day may refer to:

- "Cremains of the Day", a 2019 episode of American animated sitcom Bless the Harts
- "Cremains of the Day" (The Simpsons), a 2024 episode of American animated sitcom The Simpsons
