= It's a Blunderful Life =

- The Simpsons episode
- Episode no.: Season 35; Episode 7
- Directed by: Matthew Nastuk
- Written by: Elisabeth Kiernan Averick
- Production code: OABF19
- Original air date: November 19, 2023

Episode features
- Couch gag: A turkey is created by cutting a tracing of a hand. The turkey eats seeds, which causes a member of the Simpson family to appear on each finger. It walks to the couch and eats another seed. This causes the turkey to defecate Homer.

Episode chronology
← Previous "Iron Marge"	Next → "Ae Bonny Romance"
- The Simpsons season 35

"It's a Blunderful Life" is the seventh episode of the thirty-fifth season of the American animated television series The Simpsons, and the 757th episode overall. It aired in the United States on Fox on November 19, 2023. The episode was directed by Matthew Nastuk and written by Elisabeth Kiernan Averick.

In this episode, Homer is blamed for causing a town blackout, and Marge doubts him when he claims his innocence. The episode received mixed reviews.

== Plot ==
In the future, the Simpson family gathers for Thanksgiving after Homer died. Before eating, they light candles in memory of a blackout that almost ruined the town. Lisa then tells the story of why they light candles. In the present, Marge asks Homer to install the storm windows, which he promises to do after work. At the power plant, the workers are having a party while Mr. Burns is welcoming new workers who will replace the partying workers. Homer is forced throw out the garbage from the party. At the same time, Mr. Burns overloads a power outlet, starting a fire. This causes a power plant meltdown, and the town loses power. The workers blame Homer.

When Homer arrives home, he installs the storm windows. His behavior makes Marge think that Homer caused the blackout. He denies it, but Marge does not believe him. People begin to throw objects through the windows. The next day, the food in the refrigerator is missing. Marge thinks Homer ate it, and she stops him when he tries to explain. Homer tries to go to Moe's Tavern, but no one wants him there, so he returns home. Overnight, the townspeople move the Simpson house away to the top of a rocky mountain.

Homer shows Marge a photograph of him burying food in the snow to preserve it. Marge sees that Homer was telling the truth and reasons that Homer may not have caused the blackout. The family then suspect Mr. Burns as Mayor Quimby called him the town villain. Mr. Burns is arrested by Chief Wiggum and forced to pay a fine to Mayor Quimby which was not a heavy one. Marge offers to cook a meal for the townspeople in exchange for returning the house to its original location.

In the future, Bart has died from boredom while listening to the story.

== Production ==
The episode depicts a scene of Homer strangling Bart. This followed a controversy after the airing of "McMansion & Wife" earlier in the season, in which Homer states that he no longer strangles Bart. This caused viewers to debate whether the character of Homer should change, and the producers stating that Homer would not change.

The couch gag was created by Katrin von Niederhäusern and Janine Wiget. Von Niederhäusern and Wiget first came to the producers' attention after they created a live-action shot-by-shot remake of the eating montage from the twenty-ninth season episode "Lisa Gets the Blues."

== Reception ==
=== Viewing figures ===
The episode earned a 0.31 rating with 1.11 million viewers, which was the most-watched show on Fox that night.

=== Critical response ===
John Schwarz of Bubbleblabber gave the episode a 6 out of 10. He thought the episode was a repeat of the premise of The Simpsons Movie. He highlighted the couch gag but related to Bart dying of boredom with the story.

Cathal Gunning of Screen Rant thought the episode was the best holiday episode in years. He felt the repeated premise worked because it is a reliable story, and he highlighted the use of Mr. Burns as the villain.
