= Homer's Crossing =

- The Simpsons episode
- Episode no.: Season 35; Episode 1
- Directed by: Steven Dean Moore
- Written by: Cesar Mazariegos
- Production code: OABF18
- Original air date: October 1, 2023

Episode chronology
← Previous "Homer's Adventures Through the Windshield Glass"	Next → "A Mid-Childhood Night's Dream"
- The Simpsons season 35

"Homer's Crossing" is the season premiere of the thirty-fifth season of the American animated television series The Simpsons, and the 751st episode overall. It aired in the United States on Fox on October 1, 2023. The episode was directed by Steven Dean Moore and written by Cesar Mazariegos.

In this episode, Homer becomes a crossing guard but begins to abuse his powers. The episode received positive reviews.

== Plot ==
When Otto disappears with the school bus after taking drugs, a meeting is held to decide whether to force parents to drive their children to school or let them walk. They choose to let the children walk to school, and Homer accidentally volunteers to become a crossing guard. At the power plant, Homer realizes that his workstation is fake because his co-workers do not trust his skills. On his first day as a crossing guard, the children laugh at him, but he saves Ralph from being run over in the street.

Homer becomes a hero for saving Ralph, and Mayor Quimby gives Homer funding for himself and to hire more people. Homer's team begins to control the crosswalk, preventing anyone, including Chief Wiggum, from crossing without their permission. One day, when several major events at Springfield Elementary School happen at once, the crossing guards cannot handle the chaos. At a town meeting, Homer claims that he can prevent the issue from happening again by receiving more funding. Although Chief Wiggum protests, Quimby agrees with Homer.

Homer begins to buy weapons and demands free meals from restaurants. When Quimby tries to reduce the crossing guard budget, Homer threatens Quimby. Wiggum and the police decide to fight Homer and the crossing guards in the street. However, Otto returns and hits Homer with the school bus. The police decline to arrest Otto. In the hospital, Lisa hopes that Homer learns from the experience.

== Production ==
The episode was previewed in a lengthy trailer for Season 35 on September 11, 2023.

== Release ==
The episode aired simultaneously in the United States in all time zones at 8 PM ET/5 PM PT.

== Reception ==
=== Viewing figures ===
Leading out of an NFL doubleheader, the episode earned a 1.1 rating with 3.58 million viewers, which was the most-watched show on Fox that night.

=== Critical response ===
John Schwarz of Bubbleblabber gave the episode a 7 out of 10, he liked the gags and a fight scene similar to one from Anchorman: The Legend of Ron Burgundy (2004) but criticized the perceived decline of Julie Kavner's Marge Simpson and Harry Shearer's Otto voices.

Michael Boyle of /Film thought the episode was an entertaining way to comment on the topic of police funding. He highlighted the scene where Mayor Quimby gives more money to Homer in order to fix the crossing guard issues.

John Anderson of The Wall Street Journal liked the episode's dialog and visual jokes. He pointed out the meeting of the two qualities with the joke about the "Brunchhausen by Loxy" restaurant.
