= Iron Marge =

- The Simpsons episode
- Episode no.: Season 35; Episode 6
- Directed by: Matthew Faughnan
- Written by: Mike Scully
- Production code: OABF22
- Original air date: November 12, 2023

Guest appearance
- Megan Mullally as Sarah Wiggum

Episode chronology
← Previous "Treehouse of Horror XXXIV"	Next → "It's a Blunderful Life"
- The Simpsons season 35

"Iron Marge" is the sixth episode of the thirty-fifth season of the American animated television series The Simpsons, and the 756th episode overall. It aired in the United States on Fox on November 12, 2023. The episode was directed by Matthew Faughnan and written by Mike Scully.

In this episode, Bart and Lisa buy a birthday gift for Marge, who is disappointed with it, so they try to learn more about her. Megan Mullally guest starred as Sarah Wiggum. The episode received positive reviews.

== Plot ==
Late at night, a car crash occurs outside the Simpson house. As the Simpsons and their neighbors investigate, the women compare their robes. They notice that Marge's robe has worn out. Meanwhile, Homer prevents Kirk Van Houten from stepping on a live wire. He posts a warning on social media, but his ranking is at the bottom. Later, Lisa wants to buy Marge a new robe with Bart for her birthday. At the store, they see a spy kit toy and buy it instead of the robe. They receive a free ironing board cover to give to Marge by applying for a store credit card.

At Marge's birthday party, the children give her the ironing board cover. Marge pretends to be happy. Using their spy kit later, they hear Marge talking to Ned Flanders about how she was saddened by her gift. Bart and Lisa feel guilty and decide to learn more about Marge. They discover that Marge had a parrot as a child, but her mother sent it away. They resolve to go find it and bring it back to her. Meanwhile, Homer posts more hazard warnings on social media but is exaggerating their dangers to increase his ranking. He competes with Agnes Skinner, and they both fall into a sinkhole.

Bart and Lisa find the parrot's owner, who says it escaped from its cage. Going home, they see the parrot in a nearby tree. They use a recording of Marge's voice, obtained with the spy kit, to capture the bird. At home, Marge is presented with the parrot, who starts attacking her and damaging the house. She explains that this is how the parrot expresses affection, which is why it was sent away. However, Marge is moved by Bart and Lisa's effort to retrieve the parrot. They decide to send the parrot back to its owner. Meanwhile, Homer and Agnes argue in the sinkhole. When Agnes chokes while eating candy, Homer rescues her. He concludes that he wants to save people instead of competing for a ranking, so he helps Agnes climb out of the sinkhole. However, Agnes abandons him.

Later, another late-night car crash occurs outside the house, and the neighbors go outside to investigate. The women notice that Marge has a new robe and are impressed, but no car is seen. Marge, Bart, and Lisa had used the spy kit to generate the car crash sound.

== Production ==
Writer Mike Scully based this episode on a childhood experience where he and his brother bought an inconsiderate gift for their mother at a department store. He was also caught shoplifting at the same store another time, which became the premise for the seventh season episode "Marge Be Not Proud."

== Release ==
The episode aired simultaneously in the United States in all time zones at 8:30 PM ET/5:30 PM PT following a special episode of the television series Krapopolis.

== Reception ==
=== Viewing figures ===
The episode earned a 0.55 rating with 1.92 million viewers, which was the second-most-watched show on Fox that night.

=== Critical reception ===
John Schwarz of Bubbleblabber gave the episode an 8 out of 10. He enjoyed the sight of the parrot terrorizing the family. He also liked the commentary coming from the subplot of Homer being a social media poster.

Chaeyeon Park of Comic Book Resources (CBR) praised the commentary about the feelings of mothers and the treatment of mothers by their children. Park also liked that Bart and Lisa were portrayed as children without Bart being mischievous or Lisa being well-informed. According to Chris Grudge of CBR, "Iron Marge" is the sixth best episode of the show's 35th season. He noted that it was a heartwarming episode and highlighted Homer's side quest.

Keegan Kelly of Cracked noted that it was "a bland entry for the Simpsons’ 756th episode". According to him, the Simpsons writers "covered heavily-tread territory as they told the story of Lisa and Bart".
