= Thirst Trap: A Corporate Love Story =

- The Simpsons episode
- Episode no.: Season 35; Episode 4
- Directed by: Timothy Bailey
- Written by: Rob LaZebnik
- Production code: OABF21
- Original air date: October 29, 2023

Guest appearances
- Christiane Amanpour as herself; Elizabeth Banks as Persephone Odair; Ken Burns as himself; Peter Coyote as himself; Peter Jackson as himself; Andrew Ross Sorkin as himself; Kara Swisher as herself

Episode chronology
← Previous "McMansion & Wife"	Next → "Treehouse of Horror XXXIV"
- The Simpsons season 35

"Thirst Trap: A Corporate Love Story" is the fourth episode of the thirty-fifth season of the American animated television series The Simpsons, and the 754th episode overall. It aired in the United States on Fox on October 29, 2023. The episode was directed by Timothy Bailey and written by Rob LaZebnik.

In this episode, Mr. Burns funds a questionable company that turns salt water into drinking water. Elizabeth Banks guest starred as Persephone. "The Simpsons" title does not appear in the episode. The episode received mixed reviews.

== Plot ==
Mr. Burns is being interviewed for a documentary. One year ago, Persephone Odair is describing her company’s product, which turns salt water into drinking water. It was inspired by her grandfather, who died on a lifeboat in the ocean. Looking for funding, Lisa suggests asking Mr. Burns. He agrees and gives her part of the power plant and its workers, including Homer and Carl, to be company offices and staff. Everyone signs non-disclosure agreements. Surprisingly, Burns and Persephone suddenly get married.

Burns and Persephone demonstrate the product to the board of directors, but they are not allowed to drink the water. At the company, workers, including Carl, begin to disappear after they question the viability of the product. Posts on social media also question the company, but Burns buys the companies and deletes the posts. Lisa continues to believe in Persephone. The documentary interviews a whistleblower who discloses that the product does not work. However, the documentary stops suddenly when Burns buys the documentary company.

More documentaries are produced about Persephone’s company, and the whistleblower is revealed to be Homer. He and Lisa went to the company after hours where Carl demonstrated that the product masks the salt water taste with soda instead of removing salt. At the first public demonstration at Springfield Elementary School, Homer tells Burns that Persephone is a fraud, and the water will kill the children. Persephone refuses Burns’ pleas, but Homer disables the products. Burns and Persephone divorce, and she goes to prison. In an interview, Persephone maintains her innocence and repeats the story of her original inspiration, but the interviewer proves that the story is also a lie.

== Production ==
Elizabeth Banks guest starred as Persephone, a love interest for Mr. Burns and a parody of Elizabeth Holmes. Journalists Christiane Amanpour, Andrew Ross Sorkin, Kara Swisher, actor Peter Coyote, and director Peter Jackson appeared as themselves. Filmmaker Ken Burns reprised his role as himself. Jimmy Buffett is referenced in the episode but no new audio was recorded. Mr. Buffett died seven weeks before the episode first aired.

== Purported foreshadowing ==
In the episode, Mr. Burns buys social media company Twitter for Persephone. He comments that the owner needed to sell it after crashing a rocket into the International Space Station. Viewers commented on social media that it was a future prediction by the show.

== Reception ==
=== Viewing figures ===
The episode earned a 0.31 rating with 1.12 million viewers, which was the most-watched show on Fox that night.

=== Critical reception ===
John Schwarz of Bubbleblabber gave the episode a 6.5 out of 10. He thought the jokes were not original because they could have been found online a year ago. He liked the performances by Elizabeth Banks and Kevin Michael Richardson.

Mike Celestino of Laughing Place praised the guest stars and the jokes. He also liked the documentary concept but thought the subject matter was slightly "out-of-date."

=== Awards and nominations ===
Writer Rob LaZebnik was nominated for the Writers Guild of America Award for Television: Animation at the 76th Writers Guild of America Awards for this episode.
