= Night of the Living Wage =

- The Simpsons episode
- Promotional poster
- Episode no.: Season 35; Episode 14
- Directed by: Chris Clements
- Written by: Cesar Mazariegos
- Production code: 35ABF07
- Original air date: April 7, 2024

Guest appearance
- Jason Mantzoukas as Finn Bon Idée

Episode chronology
← Previous "Clan of the Cave Mom"	Next → "Cremains of the Day"
- The Simpsons season 35

"Night of the Living Wage" is the fourteenth episode of the thirty-fifth season of the American animated television series The Simpsons, and the 764th episode overall. It aired in the United States on Fox on April 7, 2024. The episode was directed by Chris Clements and written by Cesar Mazariegos.

In this episode, Marge works in a ghost kitchen when the family needs money. Jason Mantzoukas guest starred as Finn Bon Idée. The episode received positive reviews.

The title is a spoof of Night of the Living Dead.

== Plot ==
Lisa is taking Snowball II for a walk in a stroller when she attacks and injures an emotional support chicken. The Simpson family is forced to pay the veterinarian bill, so Marge finds a job working nights at a ghost kitchen for a food delivery app company. Without Marge, the family agrees to cook dinners at home together. At the kitchen, Marge and the workers are paid minimum wage with the potential for overtime pay, but they are quickly overwhelmed by the number of food orders.

After a few months, Marge sleeps during the day but is happy that the family is cooking dinner together. Unknown to her, the family has been ordering dinner from the delivery app. At work, Marge learns that the workers are denied overtime pay and is asked to understand because the company does not have much money as a startup. However, Marge learns that the company CEO Finn Bon Idée is a billionaire, so Lisa tells Marge to form a union. As punishment, Marge is forced to deliver food orders within a limited time or be fired. She fails to deliver the final order at the Simpson house on time and is fired.

Marge is angry to learn that her family lied to her and that her earnings have been used to pay for food deliveries. The union goes on strike for firing Marge. The app company hires Homer as a spokesman, which pits him against Marge, and is paid with app gift cards. As the strikers protest, a mob led by Homer arrives. As they charge at each other, Finn arrives to settle the issue by firing the strikers because they have been replaced by robots and delivery drones. Feeling guilty, Homer causes an electromagnetic pulse at the power plant to disable the drones causing food to rain down as Finn ends up injured. He and Marge forgive each other.

A closing narration states that the union is rehired as the kitchen workers with the pay that Finn reluctantly gives them and that the gift cards are used to pay the veterinarian bill.

== Production ==
Writer Cesar Mazariegos wrote the story based on his wife's role as a union activist as well as the push for Proposition 22 in California, which allowed app companies to classify drivers and deliverers as independent contractors instead of employees. The series already had an episode about unions with the fourth season episode "Last Exit to Springfield," and Mazariegos wanted to show how the union-management relationship had changed since that time. The original story was written before the 2023 Hollywood labor disputes started. Production was stopped for the strike before the animation process started. After production resumed, the setting was changed from an e-commerce fulfillment warehouse to a ghost kitchen in order to make the story more relevant. Because of time constraints, Mazariegos thought it was more important to show that Homer and Marge reconciled, so the fate of the union was addressed with a voiceover narration.

Jason Mantzoukas guest starred as Finn Bon Idée, the CEO of the ghost kitchen company.

== Cultural references ==
The one-shot kitchen scene is a parody of a similar scene from the episode "Review" from the television series The Bear. In addition, Marge spills a bucket of "Mayo Edebiri," a reference to The Bear star Ayo Edebiri.

== Reception ==
=== Viewing figures ===
The episode earned a 0.20 rating with 0.83 million viewers, which was the most-watched show on Fox that night.

=== Critical response ===
John Schwarz of Bubbleblabber gave the episode a 9 out of 10. He thought the episode had plenty of jokes and highlighted the performance by Mantzoukas. He also felt the episode was a modern update of "Last Exit to Springfield" while referencing the recently concluded Hollywood strikes.

Mike Celestino of Laughing Place thought the conclusion of the episode was rushed but praised the animation.

Cathal Gunning of Screen Rant enjoyed the story's reversal of Homer's role from "Last Exit to Springfield" because he is now the one against the union. He also liked that the story was made more interesting by making Marge and him clash.

=== Awards and nominations ===
The episode was nominated for the Primetime Emmy Award for Outstanding Animated Program in the 76th Primetime Creative Arts Emmy Awards. Writer Cesar Mazariegos was nominated for the Writers Guild of America Award for Television: Animation at the 77th Writers Guild of America Awards for his script for this episode. He was also nominated for a Humanitas Prize in Comedy Teleplay for this episode.
