= Treehouse of Horror XXXIV =

- The Simpsons episode
- Promotional image for the episode
- Episode no.: Season 35; Episode 5
- Directed by: Rob Oliver
- Written by: "Wild Barts Can't Be Token": Jeff Westbrook; "Ei8ht": Jessica Conrad; "Lout Break": Dan Vebber
- Production code: OABF17
- Original air date: November 5, 2023

Guest appearances
- Kelsey Grammer as Sideshow Bob; Kylie Jenner as herself; Matthew Friend as Jimmy Fallon

Episode chronology
← Previous "Thirst Trap: A Corporate Love Story"	Next → "Iron Marge"
- The Simpsons season 35

"Treehouse of Horror XXXIV" is the fifth episode of the thirty-fifth season of the American animated television series The Simpsons, and the 755th episode overall. It aired in the United States on Fox on November 5, 2023. This is the 34th Treehouse of Horror episode, and, like the other Treehouse of Horror episodes, consists of three self-contained segments: in "Wild Barts Can't Be Token", Bart turns into a non-fungible token and Marge enters the blockchain to rescue him; in "Ei8ht", Lisa seeks the help of Sideshow Bob to track down a serial killer; and in "Lout Break", Homer eats a contaminated doughnut and starts an outbreak, turning others into versions of him.

The episode was directed by Rob Oliver, and written by Jeff Westbrook, Jessica Conrad and Dan Vebber, one writer per segment, featuring guest voices from Kelsey Grammer, Kylie Jenner and Matthew Friend. This episode's stories were primarily spoofs of the films Snowpiercer, The Silence of the Lambs, Seven and Outbreak. Its premiere was watched by around 4.4 million people. The episode received mixed reviews, with segments "Wild Barts Can't Be Token" and "Lout Break" receiving negative reviews from critics, while "Ei8ht" received positive reviews.

== Plot ==
=== "Wild Barts Can't Be Token" ===
Mayor Quimby announces his decision to close an art museum and convert its art into non-fungible tokens (NFTs). After sneaking inside it, Homer inadvertently digitizes Bart into an NFT, trapped in Homer's phone. After telling Marge, she enters the blockchain to rescue Bart with the guidance of "enlightened intellects" Kylie Jenner, Rob Gronkowski and Jimmy Fallon. She appears inside a train with low-value sentient NFTs. Marge's value increases as she unintentionally destroys an NFT, consequently teleporting to the following carriage with pricier NFTs. She kills more of them, continuing through the train before reuniting with Bart.

In the real world, Mr. Burns attempts to buy Bart as an NFT from Homer. After Marge and Bart return to the museum with Jenner's key, it is revealed that Homer turned himself into an NFT during Burns' offer. The blockchain train, driven by FOMO, runs out of fuel, rendering the NFTs, including Homer, nearly worthless.

=== "Ei8ht" ===
In an alternative ending to the fifth season episode "Cape Feare" (1993), Lisa watched Sideshow Bob brutally murder Bart on a houseboat drifting from Terror Lake to Springfield. Thirty years later, in a parody of the David Fincher series Mindhunter, a traumatized Lisa has become a renowned criminal profiler. She is called upon by Springfield Police Department Officer Nelson Muntz to help investigate a series of murders with messages of the victims' names followed by "was the first" scrawled in blood.

Seeking help in a Hannibal Lecter-style riddle or anagram from an imprisoned Bob, he instead mocks the idea as a plot cliché and provokes her wrath by bragging in a crude limerick about the murder of Bart. At the sixth victim's funeral, Lisa realizes the murder victims were all firstborns and searches a slaughterhouse owned by Ana Gram.

Nelson is killed in the slaughterhouse, while Lisa discovers a nearby room resembling her own childhood bedroom. To her horror, Lisa watches security footage that shows her as Nelson's killer. The police arrest her and, in the same cell, Lisa reveals to Bob her Fight Club-style split personality. "Professor Lisa" was an unaware accomplice and the prison guard who put them in the same cell is her sister Maggie in disguise. Revealing she planned the entire killing spree so she could avenge the murder of Bart, Lisa first plays a vinyl of the aria Bob sang before killing Bart, "He is an Englishman" from the Gilbert and Sullivan operetta H.M.S Pinafore, and then brutally murders Sideshow Bob.

=== "Lout Break" ===
At the power plant, Homer is caught eating doughnuts by Waylon Smithers. While he is complaining about society's unfair rules, a doughnut falls off and rolls, collecting nuclear waste and the DNA of assorted lab animals, but Homer runs after and eats it anyway. In a parody of Outbreak, the donut infects Homer's DNA, creating a virus that transforms the infected into his personality and likeness and which is spread through belching. The virus spreads through Springfield and turns everyone else into Homer (including Kang and Kodos). Professor Frink takes custody of Homer's children, who are immune. They seek and find the real Homer.

Frink wishes to extract Homer's DNA to develop a cure, but he refuses, as he likes that everyone is just like he is and enjoys the lack of strict rules. Thinking he will change his mind, Frink displays an infected Marge, but Homer instead finds Marge even more beautiful than ever before. Horrified, Frink pleads with Homer about how much the world needs rules and intelligent people to enforce them.

Accepting defeat, Frink decides to call in a nuclear strike to destroy Springfield and contain the virus, but at the last second Homer accidentally tears Frink's suit and turns him into yet another Homer. The virus spreads worldwide via belching, filling the entire planet with a chorus of Homers singing "Just Like Paradise" by David Lee Roth.

== Production ==
The episode was directed by Rob Oliver and its showrunners were Matt Selman and Brian Kelley. Jeff Westbrook, Jessica Conrad, and Dan Vebber wrote "Wild Barts Can't Be Token", "Ei8ht", and "Lout Break", respectively. Kylie Jenner as herself and Matthew Friend as Jimmy Fallon make up the guest voice cast. Kelsey Grammer appears as Sideshow Bob for the first time in four years since the season 31 episode "Bobby, It's Cold Outside".

According to a Paste interview with Kelley, the ideas for "Ei8ht" and "Lout Break" were determined by the writers. Selman and Kelley stated that The Simpsons producer James L. Brooks proposed a segment about NFTs. Kelley and his team approached the first segment with the perspective that NFTs are not well understood, despite the hype surrounding them. Selman pointed out the contrast between the blockchain's popularity among celebrities and their lack of familiarity with it. Selman described Jenner's willingness to make fun of herself as contributing to the "comedic integrity". In creating "Ei8ht", Kelley directed Grammer with significant ease, saying that Grammer "just knows" Sideshow Bob. Its story was based on an episode idea involving a future Sideshow Bob. Kelley said that Vebber had had a plan for a pandemic episode that changed during the COVID-19 pandemic; it was the basis for the last segment, in which they made a "fun" concept that could let the actors "stretch a little".

Due to the 2023 Writers Guild of America strike, the team had to rewrite the script months before what was planned, but only part of the animation was finished before the strike. As Brooks and head of the production team Richard K. Chung landed the episode during the strike, Kelley approved them as "the reason the episode works". The related 2023 SAG-AFTRA strike did not influence the production of season 35 as the SAG-AFTRA contract did not affect The Simpsons.

== Cultural references ==
The plot of "Wild Barts Can't Be Token" references the 2013 film Snowpiercer. The segment contains allusions to the Bored Ape NFT collection. The title is a pun on the 1991 film Wild Hearts Can't Be Broken.

"Ei8ht" references the 1991 film The Silence of the Lambs and the likeness of films directed by David Fincher, including Seven (1995), stylized as Se7en.

"Lout Break" mainly references the 1995 Wolfgang Petersen film Outbreak.

== Reception ==
=== Ratings ===
"Treehouse of Horror XXXIV" premiered on November 5, 2023, on Fox and was viewed live by 4.38 million people.

=== Critical reception ===
Writing for Bubbleblabber, critic Daniel Kurland gave the episode a 5.5 out of 10. He felt that the episode was too fast-paced and took as examples the lack of an opening sequence and of a clear explanation for Homer digitizing Bart in "Wild Barts Can't Be Token". He also felt that it seemed "like The Simpsons is checking off an arbitrary checklist than telling a quality story." Kurland praised the following sequence's plot structure as "the only horror-centric" part of the episode, but felt it was unfitting for a return of Sideshow Bob to the show. Kurland said that Treehouse of Horror series already has a recurring "'multiple Homer' concept", therefore making "Lout Break" overdone.

Hindustan Times's Tuhin Das Mahapatra opined that the episode's approach to contemporary topics like NFTs felt outdated. He mentioned the decline in cryptocurrency markets to criticise the timing of the jokes. Das Mahapatra considered "Ei8ht"'s plot as being more sinister and exciting and a "welcome change of tone" from the first segment, while also enjoying the humorous nature of "Lout Break". In his conclusion, he mentioned criticism that the episode's references felt "out of place" and that it was an example of The Simpsons' social commentary becoming less clever.

For The Salt Lake Tribune critic Scott Pierce, the episode was a "major disappointment". Pierce stated that the first segment was boring and the train would only make sense to viewers of Snowpiercer or its television adaptation. Sideshow Bob's return did not contribute to his enjoyment of the episode. In his opinion, "Lout Break" was "neither scary nor funny" and the Outbreak reference felt outdated.

Michael Boyle of /Film enjoyed the alternative ending of the previous "uniquely goofy" episode "Cape Feare" (in which Bart does not die) at the start of the segment "Ei8ht", voicing the contrast between the humor of the change and the horror of Bart's death. Boyle expressed satisfaction with watching Lisa getting "to be unapologetically evil for once" as opposed to her portrayal as "a victim or observer" in other Treehouse of Horror episodes. He considered "Ei8ht" as likely the most disturbing Treehouse segment.
