= Frinkenstein's Monster =

- The Simpsons episode
- Episode no.: Season 35; Episode 11
- Directed by: Steven Dean Moore
- Written by: Joel H. Cohen
- Production code: 35ABF03
- Original air date: February 18, 2024

Guest appearance
- Amanda Seyfried as Dr. Spivak

Episode features
- Couch gag: The Simpson family members are hanging from a tree as if they are leaves. They fall to the ground and are blown away by Groundskeeper Willie.

Episode chronology
| ← Previous "Do the Wrong Thing" | Next → "Lisa Gets an F1" |
- The Simpsons season 35

"Frinkenstein's Monster" is the eleventh episode of the thirty-fifth season of the American animated television series The Simpsons, and the 761st episode overall. It aired in the United States on Fox on February 18, 2024. The episode was directed by Steven Dean Moore and written by Joel H. Cohen.

In this episode, Homer gets a new job by cheating during the interview, but the woman whom he beat for the job becomes suspicious of him. Amanda Seyfried guest starred as Dr. Spivak. The episode received mixed reviews.

== Plot ==
In the past, an ambitious Homer is trying to be promoted to management at the power plant. However, in the present, Homer has become lazy and leaves work early to go to Moe's Tavern. At the bar, Homer sees Professor Frink, who says he has not succeeded in life. Homer receives a call from Onni Korhonen, the owner of another nuclear power plant and offers Homer a job interview. Fearing he will fail, Homer asks Frink for help. Homer accidentally interrupts a video interview with another candidate, Dr. Spivak. Assuming Homer will fail, Onni asks Spivak to leave so he can quickly interview Homer, but he is impressed with Homer, who is secretly being helped by Frink. After winning the job, Homer asks Frink to keep helping him at his new job. Meanwhile, Spivak is angered when she learns she was turned down for the job.

Frink give Homer glasses and a listening device, so he can help Homer at his new job. Onni says that he has hired Spivak as Homer's assistant. Spivak remains angry and grows suspicious when Homer acts foolishly when doing anything not related to work. At home, Marge is enjoying the benefits of Homer's new job while Lisa questions Homer's competency. Spivak learns from Lenny and Carl about Homer's performance at his old job and finds Homer's listening device. She tells Frink that he helped Homer steal her job, which make Frink feel guilty.

Frink tells Homer that he will no longer help him. Onni invites Homer and Marge on a ski trip. Onni asks Homer a work question, but he cannot answer. As Homer and Marge board a ski lift, Spivak joins them and tells Marge about Homer's cheating. Marge tells Homer to confess to Onni. At the mountaintop, Homer admits he cheated and quits his job. He returns to his old job at the Springfield Nuclear Power Plant.

== Production ==
Amanda Seyfried guest starred as Dr. Spivak.

== Reception ==
=== Viewing figures ===
The episode earned a 0.18 rating with 0.76 million viewers, which was the most-watched show on Fox that night.

=== Critical response ===
John Schwarz of Bubbleblabber gave the episode a 7.5 out of 10. He thought the episode repeats the premise of Homer getting a job for which is unqualified, but he enjoyed the events that lead to the same conclusion. He also highlighted the performance by Amanda Seyfried.

Mike Celestino of Laughing Place thought the episode had some funny gags but felt it was a repeat of older episodes. He was also disappointed that Professor Frink did not receive any character development.
