= A Mid-Childhood Night's Dream =

- The Simpsons episode
- Episode no.: Season 35; Episode 2
- Directed by: Matthew Faughnan
- Written by: Carolyn Omine
- Production code: OABF16
- Original air date: October 8, 2023

Guest appearances
- Kerry Washington as Rayshelle Peyton and Grocery Store Announcer

Episode chronology
← Previous "Homer's Crossing"	Next → "McMansion & Wife"
- The Simpsons season 35

"A Mid-Childhood's Night Dream" is the second episode of the thirty-fifth season of the American animated television series The Simpsons, and the 752nd episode overall. It aired in the United States on Fox on October 8, 2023. The episode was directed by Matthew Faughnan and written by Carolyn Omine.

In this episode, Marge experiences dread for the impending end of Bart's childhood as Bart and Lisa participate in a school event. Kerry Washington guest starred as Rayshelle Peyton. The episode received positive reviews.

== Plot ==
Homer and Marge play bubbles with 5-year-old Bart and 3-year-old Lisa in the backyard. Bart suddenly gets stuck in a giant bubble and pops, making Marge scream in horror. Marge then wakes up from her dream in the middle of the night. Homer realizes that Marge is sick and tells her she should not go to the Bounce-A-Thon at Springfield Elementary School, but Marge insists on going. Marge goes back to sleep and has another dream about taking Bart to his first day at kindergarten. Marge tries to give Bart the sweater he forgot, only to find that he suddenly aged to a teenager. Marge then finds herself in the desert talking to Homer, who resembles an otter. She then realizes she is dreaming and wonders why she is having nightmares about Bart. Her "Inner Lisa" explains "Lucy dreams" and how she is worried about Bart growing up. Dream Homer takes her to the memory of her removing a splinter from Bart's hand while being surprised at how his hand got bigger. She then finds herself at a therapist's office talking about how Bart is growing up, only to realize she is still dreaming since the "therapist" is an 18-month-old Lisa.

Marge wakes up in the morning and announces that she is coming to Bounce-A-Thon, only to find Homer already prepared the snacks for the day. Homer takes Marge back to her bedroom to rest, at which point Bart reveals he hates Bounce-A-Thon and is only going to make fun of it. Marge understands how mature Bart is and falls asleep. Back in her dreams, Marge is still fretting about how Bart is growing up and does not need her anymore and that it is a matter of time before Lisa and Maggie grow up too. Dream Homer (as a dog) comforts Marge and assures she does not need to be sad about it now because it has not happened yet. To prove his point, he takes her back to the morning and shows her how Lisa still loves Bounce-A-Thon and was excited when Marge said she was coming.

Marge wakes up and decides to go to the Bounce-A-Thon to support Lisa despite her illness. She vomits in the car and has to ride a scooter to get to the Bounce-A-Thon, stopping to vomit on the way. She makes it to Springfield Elementary in time and uses her illness to make the other parents clear her path. She tries to take Lisa's picture but passes out from the smell of hotdogs that made her sick. She wakes up in the infirmary and realizes she needs to accept that Bart is growing up. Fully recovered, she goes back to the race and takes a picture of Bart holding two bouncy balls to look like he is mooning and is proud of him.

== Production ==
Writer Carolyn Omine wrote this episode while she was sending her son away to college. Kerry Washington reprised her role as Rayshelle Peyton. Washington also voiced the public address announcer at the grocery store in Marge's dream.

The episode was previewed in a lengthy trailer for Season 35 on September 11, 2023.

== Cultural references ==
The story is an homage to the "Funhouse" episode of the television series The Sopranos where Tony Soprano gets food poisoning and learns who betrayed him during his dreams. The house exploding is also a reference to the 2010 film Inception, in which explosions occurs as the dream worlds collapse. The nuclear explosion scene is a parody of a similar scene from the 1991 film Terminator 2: Judgment Day.

== Reception ==
=== Viewing figures ===
The episode earned a 0.39 rating with 1.17 million viewers, which was the most-watched show on Fox that night.

=== Critical reception ===
John Schwarz of Bubbleblabber gave the episode a 9 out of 10, calling the episode relatable to parents with Empty nest syndrome.

Michael Boyle of /Film thought the episode was "a breath of fresh air." He liked how the characters were acting sincerely, especially with the portrayal of Marge's fears. He also praised the dynamic between Marge and Bart.

Cathal Gunning of Screen Rant thought the episode was "superb, poignant, and funny." He also commended Rayshelle Peyton's role in the story.

=== Awards and nominations ===
Writer Carolyn Omine was nominated for the Writers Guild of America Award for Television: Animation at the 76th Writers Guild of America Awards for this episode.
