= Lisa Gets an F1 =

- The Simpsons episode
- Episode no.: Season 35; Episode 12
- Directed by: Timothy Bailey
- Written by: Ryan Koh
- Production code: 35ABF05
- Original air date: February 25, 2024

Guest appearances
- Matt Berry as Chester Arborday; Rachel Bloom as Annette

Episode features
- Commentary: Matt Groening: Yeardley Smith; Matt Selman

Episode chronology
← Previous "Frinkenstein's Monster"	Next → "Clan of the Cave Mom"
- The Simpsons season 35

"Lisa Gets an F1" is the twelfth episode of the thirty-fifth season of the American animated television series The Simpsons, and the 762nd episode overall. It aired in the United States on Fox on February 25, 2024. The episode was directed by Timothy Bailey and written by Ryan Koh.

In this episode, Lisa begins go-kart racing to deal with her anxiety while Bart befriends her racing rival. Matt Berry and Rachel Bloom guest starred. The episode received positive reviews.

== Plot ==
Lisa experiences anxiety as Homer recklessly drives her to her therapy appointment. Her therapist tells Homer and Marge that her anxiety is caused by Homer's behavior while driving. To face her fears, her therapist takes Lisa to a go-kart track and has Lisa drive around the track. She hit a wall of tires, which angers her, but she learns to drive and enjoys it.

Lisa begins to race professionally. Springfield is hosting the next leg of the international children's go-kart circuit, with racer Paolo being the favorite to win. The children attend Springfield Elementary School while they are in town. Bart decides to befriend Paolo for money. In the first race at the go-kart track, Lisa beats Paolo. Watching the race, Homer becomes worried about the dangers of Lisa driving. He later has a nightmare where he bombs Lisa off a track, and he blames himself for bad parenting. Lisa is angered when he unsuccessfully tries to stop her from racing.

The final race takes place on the streets of Springfield. Paolo learns that Bart is Lisa's brother, which ends their friendship. Bart learns that Paolo tampered with Lisa's kart. During the race, Lisa is in the lead, but her kart begins to fall apart. Homer drives his car onto the track and forces the kart to a stop as it crosses the finish line in first place. Homer and Lisa forgive each other.

== Production ==
Matt Berry guest starred as Chester Arborday. Berry starred on creator Matt Groening's animated television series Disenchantment. Rachel Bloom reprised her role as Annette. Bloom first appeared in this role in the twenty-ninth season episode "Springfield Splendor." Dan Castellaneta also voiced the role of Paolo, Lisa's racing rival.

== Cultural references ==
Homer's nightmare depicts the characters as parodies of the drivers in the video game series Mario Kart as they race on the Rainbow Road track. Lisa, Homer, Milhouse, Nelson, Ralph, and Sherri or Terri are depicted as Mario, Wario, Yoshi, Bowser, Toad, and Princess Peach, respectively. The sequence also depicts Yoshi Milhouse being attacked by a Blue shell. Homer later denies knowing what Mario Kart is.

The episode's title is a reference to Formula One, commonly abbreviated "F1", and three previous episodes of the series: season ten's "Lisa Gets an "A"", season two's "Bart Gets an "F"" and "Bart's Dog Gets an "F"".

== Reception ==
=== Viewing figures ===
The episode earned a 0.21 rating with 0.87 million viewers, which was the most-watched show on Fox that night.

=== Critical response ===
John Schwarz of Bubbleblabber gave the episode an 8.5 out of 10. He liked that an episode with a racing theme was the lead-out of a NASCAR event and highlighted Lisa's use of racing to deal with her anxiety. However, he thought Bart's role was added just to find a reason to include him in the episode.

Mike Celestino of Laughing Place thought the episode was funny and liked the animation of the action sequences. He also highlighted the performance by Matt Berry.
