= Sideshow Bob =

Fictional character from The Simpsons franchise

- The Simpsons character
- First appearance: "The Telltale Head" (1990)
- Designed by: Brad Bird
- Voiced by: Kelsey Grammer

In-universe information
- Full name: Robert Underdunk Terwilliger Jr.
- Occupation: Former television personality; Former mayor; Criminal
- Family: Dr. Robert Terwilliger Sr. (father); Dame Judith Underdunk (mother); Cecil Terwilliger (brother)
- Spouses: Selma Bouvier (ex-wife); Francesca (ex-wife); Tasha (wife)
- Children: Gino

Dr. Robert Underdunk "Bob" Terwilliger Jr., PhD, better known as Sideshow Bob, is a recurring antagonist in the animated television series The Simpsons. He is voiced by Kelsey Grammer and first appeared in the episode "The Telltale Head". A self-proclaimed genius and graduate of Yale University, Bob champions high culture and speaks with a transatlantic accent similar to the one Grammer uses as Dr. Frasier Crane in the sitcoms Cheers and Frasier. He began his career as a sidekick on Krusty the Clown's television show, but after enduring constant abuse, Bob framed his employer for armed robbery in "Krusty Gets Busted", only to be foiled by Bart Simpson and sent to prison. After Bart exposes him, Bob begins seeking revenge, and the two become archenemies.

Bob's second major appearance came in season three's "Black Widower"; by bringing him back into Bart's life with another murderous scheme, the writers established a pattern they likened to Wile E. Coyote's pursuit of the Road Runner. Thereafter, Bob serves as the series' recurring evil genius, repeatedly emerging from prison with elaborate revenge schemes that Bart and Lisa usually foil. Bart remains his principal target, although his schemes also threaten Krusty and, in "The Italian Bob" (season 17), the entire Simpson family. The Halloween story "Wanted: Dead, Then Alive", the first segment of "Treehouse of Horror XXVI" (season 27), imagines Bob finally killing Bart. Before the murder, he remarks that he has spent 24 years trying to kill a ten-year-old child; with Bart dead, he soon becomes bored and brings him back to life so that he can kill him repeatedly.

Sideshow Bob shares traits with Grammer's Crane and has been described as "Frasier pickled in arsenic." The resemblance extends to the casting: David Hyde Pierce and John Mahoney played Cecil and Robert Terwilliger Sr., Bob's brother and father, respectively, echoing their roles in Frasier. Grammer, who based Bob's voice on that of actor Ellis Rabb, has been praised for his portrayal of Bob. In 2006, Grammer won a Primetime Emmy Award for voicing Sideshow Bob.

By season 36, Sideshow Bob had appeared in dozens of episodes, including both speaking roles and silent cameos. "Treehouse of Horror XXXIV" centered a story on Bob during the 35th season, and he had another speaking appearance in "The Yellow Lotus" in the 36th season. Other episodes refer to Bob without featuring him, and his role goes beyond television into other Simpsons media. He appears in the Simpsons Comics and the 2007 video game The Simpsons Game; he also stars as the main antagonist in The Simpsons Ride at Universal Studios' theme parks. A lover of Gilbert and Sullivan operettas, Sideshow Bob is also known for his singing voice; several of Grammer's performances have been included in The Simpsons musical compilations.

== Appearances ==
=== Seasons 1–8 ===
Sideshow Bob first appears in "The Telltale Head" (season 1, 1990) as a non-speaking sidekick who communicates only through a slide whistle on Krusty the Clown's television show. After the head is stolen from Jebediah Springfield's statue, Krusty encourages his viewers to identify the thief. Bob appears among the town-square mob that confronts Bart Simpson after he returns the head. After Krusty subjects Bob to repeated abuse, including shooting him from a cannon, the Yale-educated Bob grows angry with his employer and resentful of the clown's success. In "Krusty Gets Busted" (season 1, 1990), Bob turns on Krusty, disguising himself as the clown and framing him for armed robbery of the Kwik-E-Mart. After Krusty is arrested, Bob takes control of the show, introducing children to elements of high culture. However, Bob's reign is short-lived; Bart exposes him as the robber, Krusty is released, and Bob is removed from the show and sent to jail.

In "Black Widower" (season 3, 1992), Bob, prisoner number 24601, (Note: Bob's number comes from Victor Hugo's Les Misérables, in which Jean Valjean is prisoner 24601. The episode's DVD commentary makes the same connection.) is released from prison. He marries Bart's aunt Selma Bouvier as part of a scheme to take her stock-market money. Bob plans to kill Selma with a gas explosion triggered by her cigarette, but Bart again foils the plan, and Sideshow Bob returns to prison.

Bob after performing H.M.S. Pinafore in "Cape Feare" (1993). Before singing, he tells Bart: "I shall send you to heaven before I send you to hell."

In "Cape Feare" (season 5, 1993), Bob targets Bart directly. After being paroled, he threatens Bart repeatedly and forces the Simpsons into hiding as part of the Witness Relocation Program. Bob follows them to their hideout, a houseboat on Terror Lake, and prepares to kill Bart. Bob grants Bart one final request, and Bart asks to hear him sing the entire score of H.M.S. Pinafore. Bob finishes singing and nearly kills Bart, but the delay allows the houseboat to drift back to Springfield. Police arrest him.

In "Sideshow Bob Roberts" (season 6, 1994), Bob is released again and runs for mayor of Springfield as the populist Republican Party candidate. He defeats Democratic Party incumbent Joe Quimby, winning in a landslide. (Note: In "Black Widower", Bob calls himself a "lifelong, conservative Republican". When his victory is announced in "Sideshow Bob Roberts", he receives 100 percent of the vote, with a one-percent margin of error.) Bart and Lisa learn from Waylon Smithers that Bob rigged the election by using the names of deceased people. At trial, Bob claims innocence, but Bart and Lisa trick him into revealing his guilt, sending him back to prison. In "Sideshow Bob's Last Gleaming" (season 7, 1995), Bob escapes from prison and threatens to blow up Springfield with a nuclear bomb unless the city stops broadcasting all television shows. When the bomb proves to be a dud, Bob kidnaps Bart and takes to the air in the Wright brothers' plane, intending to kill himself, Bart, and Krusty. Krusty, Bob's intended target, is hiding inside a shack, improvising a performance on the Emergency Broadcast System. That attempt also fails, and Bob is captured.

Bob appears to have reformed and helps Bart and Lisa in "Brother from Another Series" (season 8, 1997). Reverend Lovejoy calls him a "model prisoner" and recommends him for the prison's work release program. Bob is reunited with his brother Cecil, now Springfield's chief hydrological and hydrodynamical engineer. Cecil resents Bob because Krusty chose Bob over him as sidekick. Seeking to frame his brother, Cecil sabotages the Springfield Dam in an attempt to flood the town. Bob, Bart, and Lisa stop Cecil and save the town, but both brothers are sent to prison despite Bob's innocence.

=== Seasons 12–19 ===
Bob returns in "Day of the Jackanapes" (season 12, 2001), once again setting his sights on Krusty. While in prison, he learns that Krusty has erased all the early shows featuring Sideshow Bob. Annoyed by the network executives, Krusty announces his retirement. Once at large, Bob develops a plot to kill Krusty using Bart as a suicide bomber during Krusty's retirement special. Just as Bob is about to kill Bart and Krusty, he hears Krusty publicly accept responsibility for turning him into a criminal and express regret for mistreating him as a sidekick. Krusty's conciliatory song disarms Bob, who abandons the murder plot and reconciles with his former employer, though his part in the scheme still sends him back to prison. Bob again helps the Simpsons in "The Great Louse Detective" (season 14, 2002), when Springfield police enlist the jailed Bob to investigate an attempt on Homer Simpson's life. During the adventure, Bob resolves to kill Bart without delay. After the culprit is revealed to be Frank Grimes's son, Bob again turns his attention to murdering Bart. However, Bob finds he is "accustomed to his [Bart's] face" and cannot do it.

By "The Italian Bob" (season 17, 2005), Bob has fashioned a new life in Italy. He is now mayor of the Tuscan village of Salsiccia, husband to Francesca, and father to Gino. The Simpson family, in Italy to retrieve a car for Mr. Burns, encounters him by chance. Bob welcomes them on the condition that they not reveal his criminal past; a drunken Lisa nevertheless calls Bob a wanted killer and exposes his prison uniform, turning the villagers against him. Bob then resolves to kill the entire Simpson family rather than Bart alone. When Francesca and Gino catch up with Bob, they join his vendetta. Bob's father, Robert Terwilliger Sr., and mother, Dame Judith Underdunk, join the vendetta in "Funeral for a Fiend" (season 19, 2007). Cecil also joins the plot. Bob initially attempts to kill the Simpson family again, but his plan fails. Having staged his own death during his trial, Bob locks Bart in the coffin and attempts to cremate him at the otherwise empty funeral home, to the maniacal laughter of the assembled Terwilligers. Lisa and the rest of the Simpson family foil the plot, and the Terwilligers are arrested.

=== Seasons 20–26 ===
In "Sex, Pies and Idiot Scrapes" (season 20, 2008), Bob is listed among the criminals sought by Homer and Ned Flanders as bounty hunters, although he is still in prison; he escapes at the end of the episode. In "Wedding for Disaster" (season 20, 2009), a keychain bearing the initials "S" and "B" leads Bart and Lisa to suspect that Bob has kidnapped Homer to stop him from marrying Marge again. Krusty, however, confirms that Bob was with him all day. The children eventually discover the true culprits, Patty and Selma. Bob also appears in a visual joke in "Coming to Homerica", the 21st episode of the season: the Simpson family enters the Cheers bar dressed as the show's cast, followed by Sideshow Bob dressed as Frasier Crane. In "O Brother, Where Bart Thou?" (season 21, 2009), Bob and Cecil make a silent cameo, flying kites in Bart's dream sequence as he longs for a younger brother.

Later that season, Bob resumes his attempts to kill Bart in "The Bob Next Door". He switches faces with his prison cellmate Walt Warren. Bob returns to Springfield and moves into the house next to the Simpson family, assuming Walt's identity. He plans to use multiple state lines to evade prosecution for killing Bart, but he is foiled again and taken away by state police. Bob next appears in "At Long Last Leave" (season 23, 2012), the 500th episode of The Simpsons. He attends a town meeting to decide if the Simpson family should be banished from Springfield and joins many residents in supporting the proposal. He makes a silent appearance in "Moonshine River" (season 24, 2012), where he runs across the train tracks trying to kill Bart and is struck by a train.

Bob's genetically modified jaw in "The Man Who Grew Too Much" (2014). The A.V. Club described the transformation as "unimaginatively lazy".

In "The Man Who Grew Too Much" (season 25, 2014), Bob has become chief scientist at Monsarno, a chemical engineering company, after serving as a test subject and publishing the results of experiments performed on him. He and Lisa bond over their interest in Walt Whitman, but Bob reveals that he has modified his own genes to acquire several superhuman abilities. He plans to use DNA from historical figures' relics in the Springfield Museum to transform himself into a superhuman dictator. After a family repeatedly asks him to take another photograph, Bob chases down Bart and Lisa in a murderous rage. Before he can kill them, teenagers from Marge's abstinence class attack him. Lisa quotes Whitman during the fight; confronted with what he has become, Bob jumps off the Springfield Dam. The final shot reveals Bob alive underwater, breathing through the gills he engineered. The A.V. Club found the experimentation too cartoonish even for The Simpsons, while TV Fanatic called the transformation "silly even for him".

Bob is back in prison in "Clown in the Dumps" (season 26, 2014). He offers his condolences to Krusty following the death of Krusty's father, Rabbi Krustofsky. Several episodes later, in "Blazed and Confused" (season 26, 2014), Bob meets Bart's former teacher Mr. Lassen. Now a prison guard after losing his teaching job through Bart's actions at a "Blazing Guy" festival, Lassen offers to free Bob if they team up and take turns gutting Bart. Bob declines.

=== Seasons 27–36 ===
The Halloween story "Wanted: Dead, Then Alive", the first segment of "Treehouse of Horror XXVI" (season 27, 2015), imagines Bob using Milhouse's phone to trap Bart in the band classroom and finally killing him. His revenge accomplished, Bob turns to other ambitions, only to find his life meaningless without Bart. He creates a machine that repeatedly brings Bart back to life so that he can kill him again. The other Simpsons eventually find Bob and rescue Bart, who uses the machine to turn Bob into a twisted amalgamation of creatures.

Several brief appearances follow in seasons 27 and 28. In "Gal of Constant Sorrow" (season 27, 2016), Bob joins Snake Jailbird and other inmates in wiping Bart's graffiti from Hettie Mae Boggs' promotional poster. Bob returns in "Treehouse of Horror XXVII" (season 28, 2016), the 600th episode of The Simpsons. In the opening sequence, he forms a four-member group of Homer's enemies that includes the ghost of Frank Grimes. Seeking revenge, the group attempts to kill the Simpsons, but Maggie kills every member except Grimes's ghost. In the ending sequence, Bob is one of the characters featured in the "600" song. In "Havana Wild Weekend" (season 28, 2016), Sideshow Bob appears silently in the Cuban customs line. Bob also makes a silent cameo in "The Nightmare After Krustmas" (season 28, 2016); as Krusty nearly drowns in a frozen lake, Bob stands among the crowd holding a sign that reads "Die Clown".

In "Gone Boy" (season 29, 2017), Bob tries to locate Bart after he goes missing and is presumed dead. When Bob finds Bart, he prepares to kill him and Milhouse, but saves them at the last minute after recalling the prison therapist's lessons about moving on from his desire to kill Bart. The epilogue shows an older Bob working as a lighthouse keeper. It also shows him writing "Die Bart Die" in the sand. In "The Fat Blue Line" (season 31, 2019), Bob escapes from prison once again, only to be hit by a rake truck. Several episodes later, in "Bobby, It's Cold Outside" (season 31, 2019), he is hired to play Santa Claus at a theme park and later helps the Simpsons discover who is stealing everyone's Christmas gifts.

Examples of Bob's brief appearances across seasons 32 and 33 include "I, Carumbus" (season 32, 2020), in which he is an Ancient Roman gladiator and is sliced in half by Obeseus (Homer). Later that season, in "Manger Things" (season 32, 2021), a Christmas card shows him holding a Bart-shaped present beneath the text "Just what you've always wanted". Bob makes another silent cameo in "Meat Is Murder" (season 33, 2022), where he writes "Die Kirk Die" on Kirk Van Houten's chest during the celebration of Krusty Burger's 50th anniversary—a callback to the "Die Bart, Die" scene from "Cape Feare".

External videos
- Sideshow Bob in season 35
- Lisa recruits Sideshow Bob to investigate a murder in "Ei8ht" (2023), an official Fox preview.

The "Treehouse of Horror XXXIV" segment "Ei8ht" (season 35, 2023) imagines an alternative ending to "Cape Feare" in which Bob realizes that Bart is using Pinafore to delay his death. Bob kills him, traumatizing Lisa. Thirty years later, Professor Lisa Simpson seeks help from the imprisoned Bob after Springfield police ask her to investigate a series of murders by an unknown serial killer. He taunts her with a cryptic clue, and Lisa later realizes that she committed all the murders herself. Bob is transferred to another prison cell and finds Lisa waiting for him. Lisa reveals that a split personality emerged after Bart's death and that she committed the murders in hopes of being imprisoned alongside Bob. To the music of H.M.S. Pinafore, Lisa gleefully slashes Bob to death.

In the season 36 episode "The Yellow Lotus", Bob appears in a supporting role as a married guest at the same resort as the Simpsons. He describes himself as a sociopath "with a slight touch of the narcissist" and is taking medication. When Marge tells Tasha about Bob's past crimes, Tasha throws him off a cliff. He survives and later talks with Sideshow Mel.

== Other media ==
=== Film, comics, and music ===
Outside of the television series, Bob appears with Disney villains in the 2024 Disney+ animated short film The Most Wonderful Time of the Year. In the short, Bob performs a Halloween parody of the title song. Al Jean said the producers centered the short on Bob because Grammer enjoyed singing and they wanted him to perform the Halloween version of the song. Grammer recorded several Sideshow Bob lines for a scene ultimately cut from The Simpsons Movie. In the deleted scene, Bob joins an angry mob intent on killing Bart, then leaves in disappointment after learning that it is apparently targeting only Homer. Bob also appears in Simpsons Comics. Issue 186, released on January 18, 2012, contains a 21-page Sideshow Bob story "Sideshow Slob", scripted by Ian Boothby and penciled by John Delaney. The collection Simpsons Comics Beach Blanket Bongo contains a story in which a surgically altered Bob returns from prison in disguise.

Several of Grammer's singing performances have been included in The Simpsons CD compilations. His performance of H.M.S. Pinafore in "Cape Feare" later appeared on the album Go Simpsonic with The Simpsons as part of the track "Cape Feare (Medley)", and the song "The Very Reason That I Live" from "The Great Louse Detective" appeared on The Simpsons: Testify. A previously unaired song, "Hullaba Lula", performed by Grammer, also appeared on The Simpsons: Testify. In commentary for "Day of the Jackanapes", Jean also recalled that an unnamed "Zip-a-Dee-Doo-Dah" parody had been written for the episode and cut after the producers could not clear the song.

=== Games and attractions ===
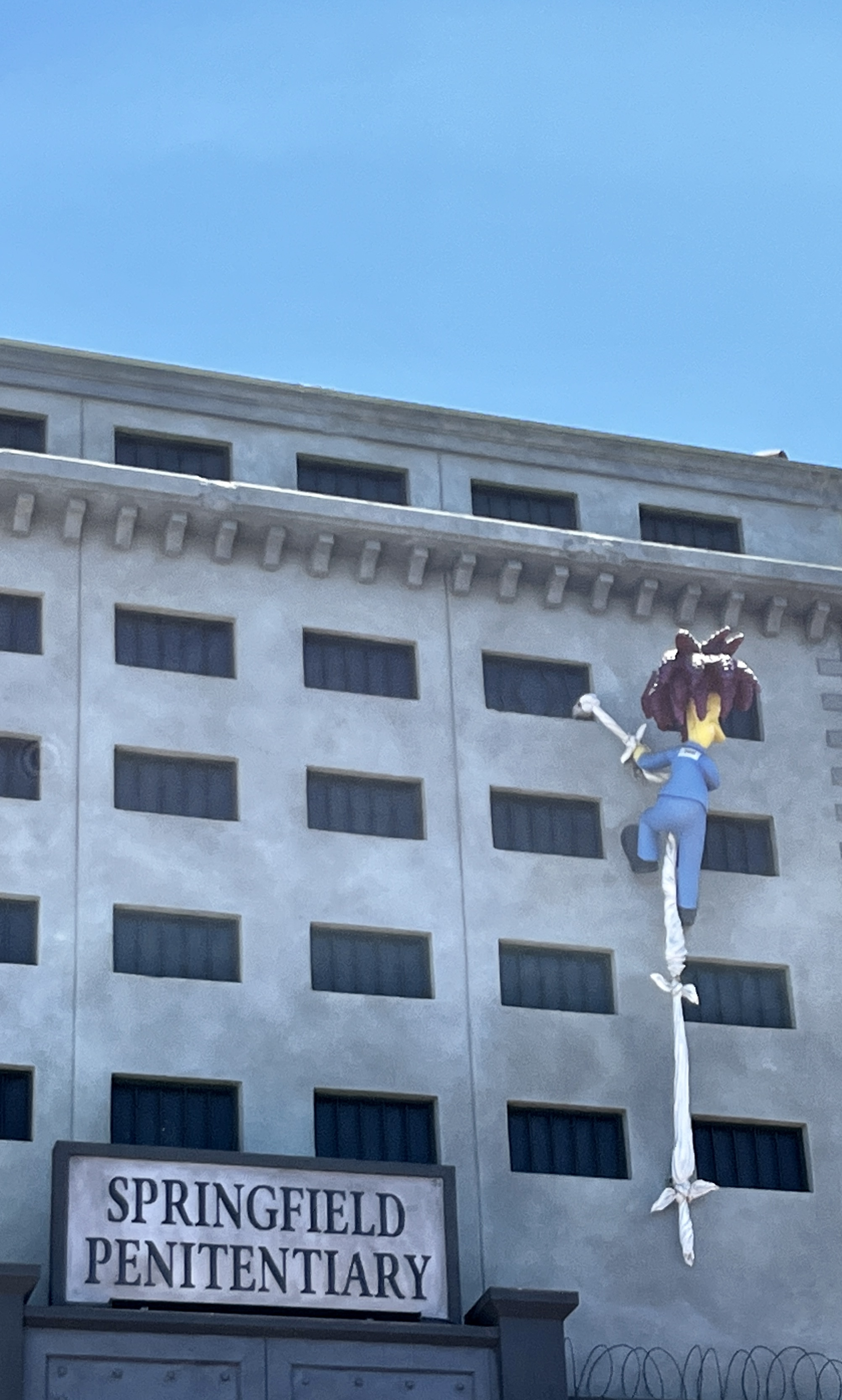
Sideshow Bob depicted escaping from Springfield Jail at Universal Studios Hollywood (2022).

Sideshow Bob appears in the 1991 The Simpsons Arcade Game, where he is one of the Springfield characters who walk past the players. Bob is also named among the antagonists in the 1991 video game Bart vs. the Space Mutants. In The Simpsons Game, released in November 2007, Bob has a cameo appearance. Bob has a larger role in The Simpsons Ride, which opened at Universal Studios Florida and Universal Studios Hollywood in May 2008. LAist called the Hollywood event the ride's "long-awaited official opening". The attraction uses original animation and the show's original voice cast. Voiced by Grammer, Bob is the main villain in the ride. Bob had previously been considered for the role of main villain in a Simpsons film, but the idea was saved for the ride. Having escaped from prison, he takes control of the park to get revenge on the Simpson family.

In The Simpsons: Tapped Out, a city-building game launched for iOS in early 2012, Sideshow Bob appears as a recurring encounter. Bob reappears intermittently; players can tap him to make an arrest and receive cash and experience points. In a later update to the game, Krustyland also includes the "Sideshow You" balloon-pop minigame, where players can win Krusty tickets and have a chance to reveal donuts. The Terwilligers content update for The Simpsons: Tapped Out was released on April 14, 2015, and alluded to Bob's light-opera performances and recurring encounters with rakes. The event was split into three acts and ended May 26, 2015. New characters, skins, and costumes included Sideshow Bob, Cecil Terwilliger, Gino Terwilliger, Francesca Terwilliger, Dr. Robert Terwilliger Sr., Dame Judith Underdunk, Captain Bob, and Opera Krusty. Central event locations included Monsarno Research and the Outdoor Opera Stage.

== Creation and development ==
=== Design and name ===
Sideshow Bob in his first appearance in "The Telltale Head", with the rounded hairstyle used before his redesign for "Krusty Gets Busted"

Sideshow Bob first appeared in "The Telltale Head", the eighth episode of season 1. In that episode, Bob has a rounded hairstyle. A later model sheet describes his head shape as "a longer version of Homer's thumb-shaped head" and notes that his eyes are set apart. Toward the end of the episode, however, he reappears in a panning shot of a crowd with his now-familiar newer hairstyle. His first major appearance came in season 1's twelfth episode, "Krusty Gets Busted", written by Jay Kogen and Wallace Wolodarsky. Brad Bird designed Sideshow Bob. For the episode, Bird gave Bob a sleeker design, which evolved to better fit Kelsey Grammer's vocal performance. Bird directed the episode without an assistant director, before the staff had worked out how to manage overseas production; he recalled that many of their instructions were ignored. Following the redesign, animators tried to update Bob's scenes in "The Telltale Head", but the overseas studio did not have time. Director David Silverman later updated the character model for "Black Widower" to reflect Bird's animation. Bird particularly enjoyed animating Bob and Krusty, whom he found "really absurd and strangely real". Bird asked to make the key drawings for selected scenes in Bob and Krusty episodes.

Sideshow Bob's full name is Robert Underdunk Terwilliger Jr., PhD. (Note: In 2024, Oakley said that he and Josh Weinstein had written the middle name as "Onderdonk", not "Underdunk". He recalled seeing the name in a hymnal when they were in high school and linked it to Henry Onderdonk.) His surname is revealed in "Black Widower", and his middle name in "Sideshow Bob Roberts". Larry Carroll of MTV Movie News reported that Bob's surname came from Dr. Terwilliker, the title character of The 5,000 Fingers of Dr. T., a domineering piano teacher played by Hans Conried. Dr. Seuss co-wrote the film, in which Terwilliker subjects a boy to hours of piano lessons. The Oregonian has also associated the name with Southwest Terwilliger Boulevard in Portland, Oregon. In a documentary, Matt Groening described the alphabetically ordered streets of northwest Portland. (Note: In the documentary segment, Groening listed Terwilliger alongside Kearney, Lovejoy, Quimby, and Flanders.)

=== Voice ===
Bob does not speak until late in "Krusty Gets Busted"; he communicates only through a slide whistle. When he finally speaks, he dismisses it as a "primitive wind instrument". His articulateness and intelligence became part of the character's humor. The original 78-page script for "Krusty Gets Busted" was written with James Earl Jones in mind; the producers discussed casting him, but ultimately selected Kelsey Grammer. Groening later said that Grammer's voice fit with the regular cast and did not make Bob feel like an outsider. Grammer played Frasier Crane on Cheers for nine years and often sang on its set. Simpsons co-developer Sam Simon, who had worked on Cheers, remembered those performances and advocated casting him as Bob partly for his singing voice. According to Grammer, Simon telephoned to ask him to sing Cole Porter's "Ev'ry Time We Say Goodbye", explaining, "we want him [Sideshow Bob] to speak finally". Bob also sings the song later in the episode.

For Bob's voice, Grammer performed an impression of Ellis Rabb, a theater actor and director. The Independent described the result as a deep, overly theatrical voice. Grammer had previously worked for Rabb, painting his apartment and hanging wallpaper while listening to his stories. He mentally recorded Rabb's voice and thought, "I'm gonna use him someday". When he later read the Sideshow Bob script, Bob's taste for Cole Porter reminded him of Rabb.

=== Writing and character development ===
For season 3's "Black Widower", the writers echoed the premise of Wile E. Coyote chasing the Road Runner from Looney Tunes cartoons by having Bob unexpectedly reenter Bart's life through his marriage to Selma, whom he plans to murder. Executive producer Al Jean has likewise compared Bob's repeated pursuit of Bart to Wile E. Coyote's pursuit of the Road Runner. Like Coyote, Bob is intelligent but continually foiled by less intelligent opponents. Bill Oakley and Josh Weinstein chose a mayoral campaign instead of another murder plot for "Sideshow Bob Roberts" (1994).

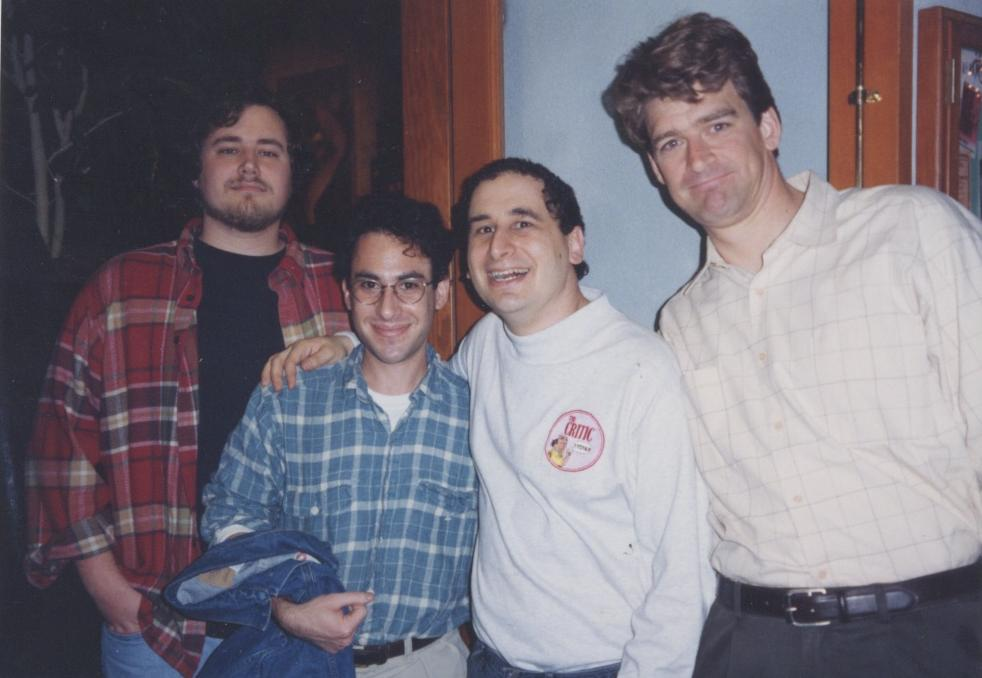
From left: The Simpsons writers Bill Oakley, Josh Weinstein, Mike Reiss, and Jeff Martin in 1994.

As showrunners for seasons 7 and 8, Oakley and Weinstein believed that each season should include a Sideshow Bob episode. By season 7, however, several Bob-centered episodes had already aired, and the writers struggled to find new uses for him. They sought new angles by pairing Bob with characters other than Bart, including Homer. Weinstein described Bob's refined dialogue as difficult to write. Despite the challenge, Ken Keeler called writing a "Sideshow Bob episode" "the real prize", and former director Dominic Polcino called directing one "a treat". Jean has separately described Bob's returns with Grammer as "always great". In 2014, Jean said he was "really, really careful" about approving new Bob episodes because he did not want to overuse the character.

Oakley recalled that the writers expected Bob's apparent reform in "Brother from Another Series" (1997) to be temporary: "we figured that would revert back". Earlier Bob episodes were required to recap his evil deeds for viewers. The writers also initially required Bob to return to prison at the end of each episode, but "The Great Louse Detective" and "The Italian Bob" end with him still free. In 2020, Jean said he liked Bob having a lighthouse and "thinking about the life that he wasted".

For "Treehouse of Horror XXVI" (2015), Jean chose to let Bob kill Bart. (Note: Because Treehouse of Horror stories are noncanonical, Bob could kill Bart without removing him from the regular series; the death is only temporary.) He welcomed the outcome, recalling his childhood wish that the Coyote would catch the Road Runner. The story then explored how Bob would feel after achieving his life's ambition. For "Treehouse of Horror XXXIV" (2023), co-showrunner Brian Kelley said the writers first imagined Bob in an alternate future; writer Jessica Conrad then proposed storytelling and visuals inspired by David Fincher's films. Additional movie tropes were introduced later in the process.

=== Performance and music ===
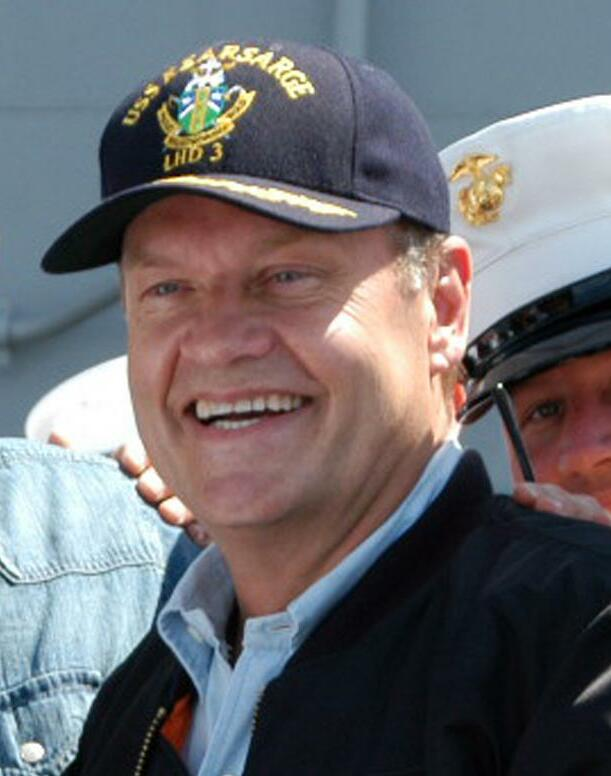
Kelsey Grammer modeled Bob's voice on actor and director Ellis Rabb.

Kelsey Grammer initially expected Sideshow Bob to be a one-time role but has called him "the most popular character I've ever played". His portrayal has also been described as enduring and readily recognized by audiences. Grammer usually joins the show's table readings, and former executive producer David Mirkin called Grammer "one of the greatest joys to direct" and said that he worked hard and was very funny. Jean has likewise said that Grammer's work "picks everything up" whenever he appears. Mirkin also praised Grammer's voice, control, and timing but noted that the actor dislikes performing Sideshow Bob's evil laugh. In a 2007 interview, Simpsons executive producer Al Jean listed Grammer as one of his favorite guest stars (second only to Phil Hartman), saying, "His voice is so rich." A Los Angeles Times profile likewise noted Grammer's smooth, deep voice and voice-over work. Writer George Meyer said that writing for Grammer was "great", adding, "He can give the kind of purple, florid, melodramatic speeches that most of the characters would never give. And he can sing."

The show's writers admire Grammer's singing voice and have had him sing "pretty much every time he's been on". Alf Clausen, the primary composer for The Simpsons, commented that "[Grammer] is so great. He's just amazing. You can tell he has this love of musical theater and he has the vocal instrument to go with it, so I know whatever I write is going to be sung the way I've heard it." For character songs, Clausen wrote music for lyrics supplied in the scripts. Clausen composed a recurring Sideshow Bob theme for "Cape Feare"; it continued to accompany Bob's releases from prison. It is based on Bernard Herrmann's score for the film Cape Fear. (Note: Clausen said that only Bob, Mr. Burns, and Krusty had recurring character themes. For "Cape Feare", he added extra French horns, trombones, tuba, and percussion to match Bernard Herrmann's style.) The musical score for "Cape Feare" earned Clausen an Emmy Award nomination for Outstanding Dramatic Underscore – Series in 1994.

=== Recurring gags ===
In a visual gag, Bob has "LUV" and "HAT" tattooed on his knuckles. The joke parodies the "LOVE" and "HATE" tattoos in The Night of the Hunter, shortening the words to fit his three cartoon fingers. A second trademark begins in "Cape Feare": Bob steps on a rake, and its handle strikes him in the face. To fill time, the writers added more rake impacts. The finished sequence repeats the action exactly as Bob steps on nine rakes. Grammer recorded only one reaction sound and did not expect it to be repeated nine times in the finished episode. (Note: For later uses of the gag, Grammer usually records the groan again, though he said editors may instead reuse the original because exact repetition makes it funnier.) Jean said that the sequence followed a comic rule he had learned from Sam Simon: a repeated joke can become funny again if it continues after first losing its effect.

Later episodes vary the gag. "The Bob Next Door" repeats the "Cape Feare" showdown, complete with the rake gag, while in "The Fat Blue Line" a truck carrying rakes strikes Bob during a prison escape. For the 2024 short "The Most Wonderful Time of the Year", Silverman suggested that Bob call the routine a "tired gag". Jean said it would be his own last use of the routine, but did not rule out its use by other writers.

Known as the "rake joke", the sequence has received praise; (Note: Mike Reiss said that repeating the sequence exactly turned a slapstick joke into a "surreal classic". Anna Pickard described the same process: the repetition stops being funny, then becomes funny again.) Entertainment Weekly described it as "genius in its repetitive stupidity". The Independent called it a "classic, memetic" gag and an "unforgettable piece of surrealist comedy". In 2017, The Ringer called it "one of the most influential jokes of the late 20th century".

=== Family and Frasier connections ===
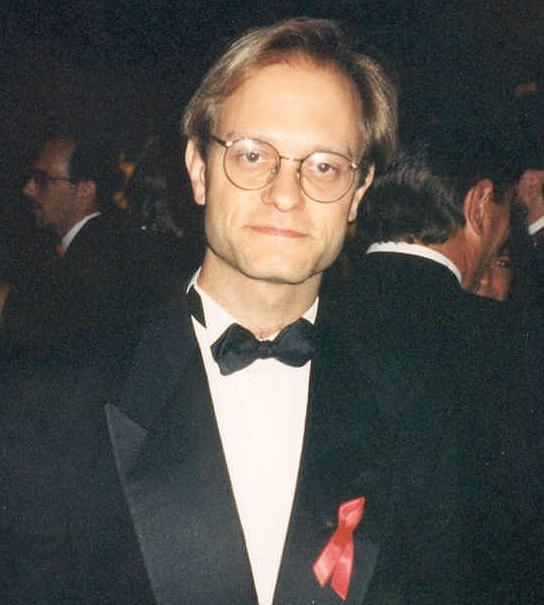
David Hyde Pierce voiced Cecil, Bob's brother, who was modeled on Pierce's role as Niles Crane in Frasier.

"Brother from Another Series" extends Bob's connection to Frasier by introducing his brother Cecil. The episode, written by Keeler, had the working title "Sideshow Bob's Brother". Keeler drew on Frasier and modeled Cecil on the brother of Grammer's character. Cecil is voiced by David Hyde Pierce, who portrayed Frasier Crane's brother Niles. The casting and characterization drew on Frasier, and Pierce and Grammer recorded together to establish the brothers' relationship. Pierce commented, "Normally, I would not do something like this. But how often do you get a chance to work with an actor like Kelsey Grammer and, more importantly, play his brother?"

Before production, Keeler sent the original script to Frasier's writers for review. Their concern was a brief scene showing a character named "Maris". Because Maris Crane is an unseen character in Frasier, they objected to showing her. (Note: Ken Keeler said that the proposed character shared Maris Crane's name but was not meant to be Niles Crane's wife. Frasier producer Christopher Lloyd disagreed: with Grammer and Pierce playing the brothers, "it's clearly Maris".) The artists drew Cecil to resemble David Hyde Pierce while retaining a visual similarity to Sideshow Bob. According to director Pete Michels, it was difficult to draw Bob and Cecil standing together because of their comically oversized feet.

"Funeral for a Fiend" extends the Frasier reunion by bringing Cecil back and introducing the brothers' father, Dr. Robert Terwilliger, played by John Mahoney. Mahoney portrayed Martin Crane, the father of Grammer's and Pierce's characters in Frasier. Rather than retain Frasier's familiar family dynamic, the episode made Mahoney's father character as "uppity and snobbish" as his animated sons; Robert Terwilliger Sr. is therefore as highbrow as Bob. Bob's mother is Dame Judith Underdunk, "the greatest classical actress of her generation". She has the same curly, spiked hair as her two sons. Bob also has a wife named Francesca and a son, Gino. Maria Grazia Cucinotta voices Francesca in both the American and Italian versions. Both characters were introduced in the season 17 episode "The Italian Bob" and returned for "Funeral for a Fiend".

Blake Taylor of /Film wrote that introducing a wife and son gave Bob greater depth while keeping him a villain. Gino shares his father's appearance, speech, and "cruel and criminal character". He and Francesca join Bob in trying to kill the Simpson family. Literary scholar Maria Elisa Montironi reads the father–son resemblance as a parallel with Shakespeare's Coriolanus. She notes that Gino's angry pursuit of a butterfly recalls young Marcius, whose violence is taken as evidence of his father's temperament.

== Reception and legacy ==
=== Character and performance ===
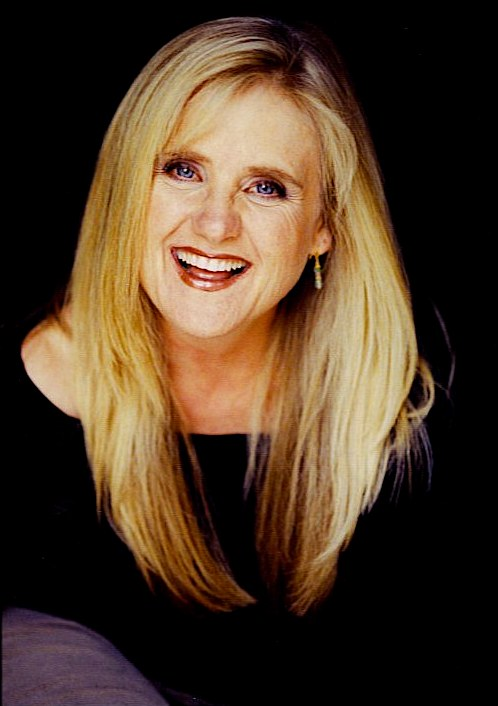
Nancy Cartwright, the voice of Bart Simpson, praised Grammer's "deliciously vile energy" as Bob.

Both the character and Grammer's performance have received critical praise. Grammer himself has called Bob "the greatest animated villain of all-time". In 2006, IGN listed him as the second-best "peripheral character" on The Simpsons, commenting that Bob is "a man of contradictions; his goofy appearance, complete with palm tree like hair, doesn't seem to match up to the well spoken and even musically talented maniac." That same year, Wizard rated Bob as the 66th-greatest villain of all time. Adam Finley of TV Squad praised Bob's baritone voice and Shakespearean delivery, calling him one of the show's best recurring characters.

In a 2020 retrospective, The Independent called Bob "the perfect Simpsons antagonist". It wrote that his vocabulary and love of Gilbert and Sullivan let the show's writers "indulge their artier inclinations", while his villainy was tempered by "vaudevillian buffoonishness". Reviewing "Black Widower", The A.V. Club wrote that Grammer "manages to make a prissy elitist scary" and praised the "musicality" and "poetry" of his performance. A 2014 A.V. Club review likewise found that Grammer could still make Bob "vitally funny and menacing" 24 years after the character's debut.

Much of this praise has focused on Grammer's voice work. The character has been described as "brilliant", "inimitable", "stentorian", and "a feast of mid-Atlantic anglophilia". In 2006, Grammer won the Primetime Emmy Award for Outstanding Voice-Over Performance for "The Italian Bob". (Note: The Academy announced Grammer's honor as a juried award, separately from the nominees for the main Emmy ceremony. The award was presented at the Creative Arts ceremony.) He had previously won four awards in the Outstanding Lead Actor in a Comedy Series category for his portrayal of the title role on Frasier. In a 2007 guest-star feature, Entertainment Weekly called the pretentious, pseudo-intellectual banter between Grammer and Hyde Pierce "a real treat". Ken Tucker of Entertainment Weekly wrote that "Kelsey Grammer's grand voice-performance as Sideshow Bob is Frasier pickled in arsenic." In her book My Life as a 10-Year-Old Boy, Nancy Cartwright (who voices Bart Simpson) wrote that "Kelsey Grammer scores big-time by injecting caustic, bitter, contemptuous and deliciously vile energy into his rendition of Sideshow Bob. Springfield just wouldn't be the same without him."

Erik Adams of The A.V. Club credited Grammer with developing Bob beyond his obsession with killing Bart. Reviewing "Sideshow Bob Roberts", he called Bob a "full-fledged character" whose desire for control extended to humanity as a whole. "Brother from Another Series" reverses Bob's usual relationship with Bart: Bob is innocent and tries to save Springfield, while Bart stalks him. Fellow A.V. Club reviewer Gwen Ihnat called the episode a "turning point" in their relationship and suggested that the two were more alike than they thought. Writing for The A.V. Club, Nathan Rabin described Bob as a snob driven by "over-class rage", but argued that he was right to want better television that respected children's intelligence. The joke, in Rabin's view, is that Bob will frame and murder people to achieve those aims. He praised Grammer for bringing out the "aristocratic rage" beneath Bob's good manners.

=== Episodes and accolades ===
By the seventh or eighth time it's funny. It's a comedic exercise.

— Chris Turner, on the repetition of the rake gag in "Cape Feare"

Several episodes featuring Bob have been well received by critics. "Cape Feare" is generally regarded as one of the best episodes of The Simpsons. It was placed third on Entertainment Weekly's 2003 list of the show's top 25 episodes. IGN named it the best episode of the fifth season. In 2007, Vanity Fair called it the show's fourth-best episode because of its "masterful integration of filmic parody and a recurring character". In Harper's Magazine, Charles Bock wrote that in the rake sequence, "the degree of repetition, the overlong extension of the joke, was the joke". Ben Rayner of the Toronto Star listed "Cape Feare", "Sideshow Bob's Last Gleaming" and "Brother from Another Series" among the best episodes of the series, calling them Grammer's best roles. Blake Taylor ranked "Sideshow Bob Roberts" sixth among Bob episodes in 2023.

John Frink won a 2007 Writers Guild of America Award in the animation category for writing "The Italian Bob". In December 2009, Robert Canning of IGN ranked the ten Bob episodes that had aired by then, placing "The Italian Bob" last. He explained that "All the things we love about a Sideshow Bob episode—the vengeance, the familiar settings and characters, the elaborate scheming—were missing from this half-hour. Without it, Bob wasn't nearly as entertaining, and the episode didn't result in a whole lot of laughs." He called "The Italian Bob" and "Funeral for a Fiend" "the only ones I'd consider clunkers", while describing the remaining episodes as "all quite fun". "Gone Boy" was nominated for the Primetime Emmy Award for Outstanding Animated Program in 2018. Critical reception of later Bob episodes was mixed: The Independent said none of them had matched the impact of "Cape Feare". A 2019 A.V. Club review said their "comic effectiveness" had "waxed and waned", but praised Grammer's "obvious joy in the villainous role".

=== Political themes and legacy ===
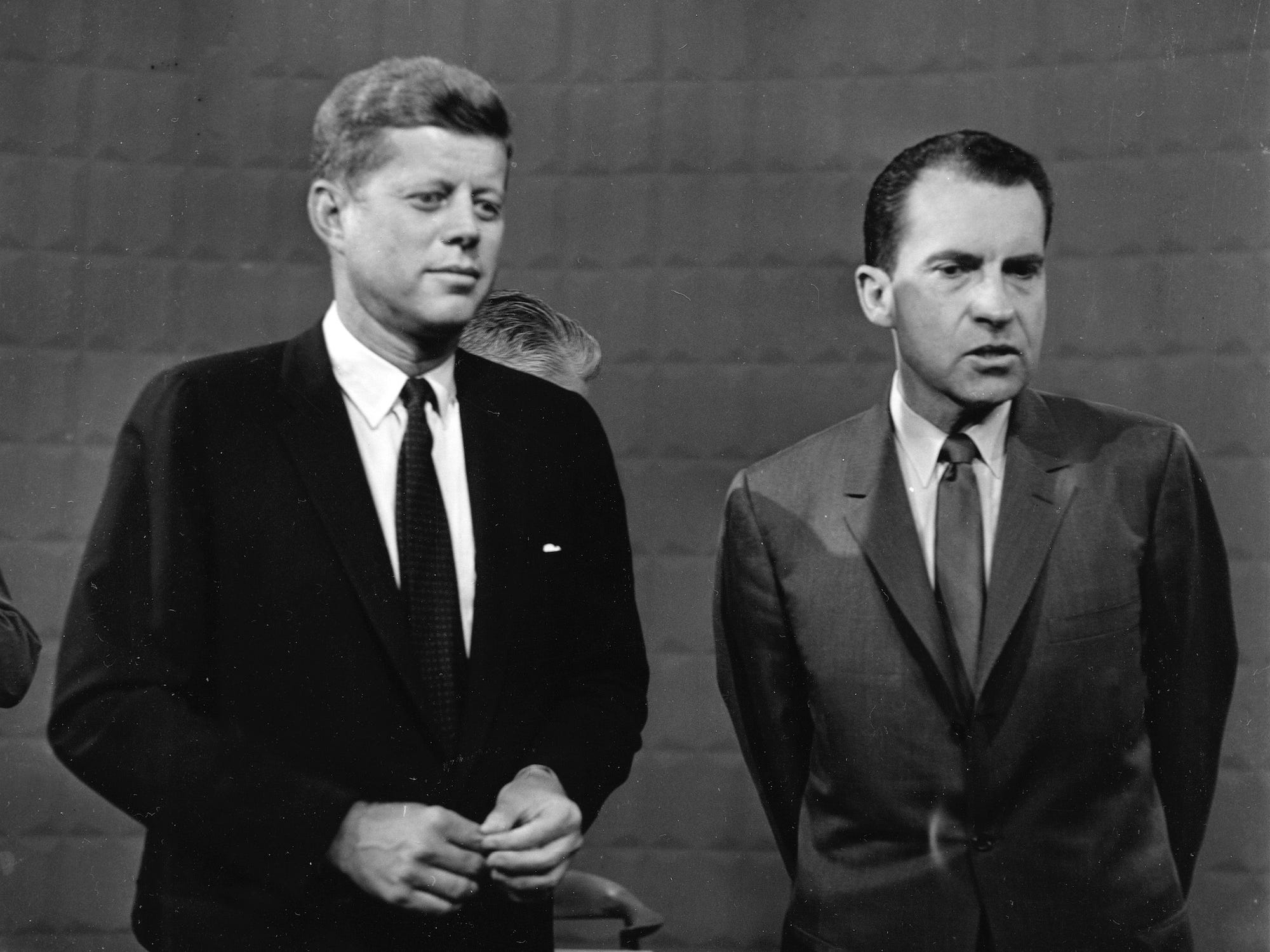
Quimby's sickly appearance in "Sideshow Bob Roberts" echoes Richard Nixon's poor health during a 1960 presidential debate.

In "Sideshow Bob Roberts", Bob rigs the election to become mayor of Springfield. Once in office, Bob directs a new expressway through the Simpsons' home to take revenge on Bart and Lisa. Woodcock argues that Bob's vengefulness, fraud, and contempt for Springfield make him no more honest than Quimby. He regards the comparison as politically neutral because it criticizes both Bob, a Republican, and Quimby, a Democrat.

When accused of election fraud, Bob rants, "Your guilty conscience may force you to vote Democratic, but deep down inside, you secretly long for a cold-hearted Republican to lower taxes, brutalize criminals, and rule you like a king. That's why I did this—to protect you from yourselves." Miller cites the episode as an illustration of Machiavellian principles, while Schweska connects Bob's rise to power specifically with political operatives and election fraud.

Matthew Henry reads "Sideshow Bob Roberts" as an illustration of the show's ideological conflicts and its engagement with the politics of sexuality. He bases this reading on Smithers's decision to help expose Bob's rigged election. Smithers says that Bob's ultraconservative views conflict with his "choice of, um, lifestyle", which Henry identifies as a reference to Smithers's homosexuality. Henry argues that the episode makes Smithers's sexuality "public and overtly political". Erik Adams called the episode "The Simpsons' finest half-hour of political satire", noting its attacks on uninformed voters and pandering politicians. Stuart Heritage described the episode in 2018 as the "definitive cultural statement about political populism". In a 2020 interview, University of New South Wales political expert Will Clapton argued that the story could just as easily concern Donald Trump's presidency, despite drawing on the Watergate scandal. He read it as a satire of the media's ability to distort facts and manipulate a "relatively lazy, uninformed, and apathetic electorate".

Bob's attempted-murder joke later became a form of political shorthand. In the episode, Bob says: "Attempted murder? Now honestly, what is that? Do they give a Nobel Prize for attempted chemistry? Do they?" In 2019, commentators discussing Trump used the label "Sideshow Bob defense". Bill Oakley applied the term to the argument that Trump's quid pro quo with Ukraine was not criminal because it had failed. He compared that reasoning to Bob's objection to being convicted of attempted murder. In 2021, The Washington Post used the label again.

== Themes and analysis ==
=== High culture and class ===
Bob replaces Krusty's slapstick with literary readings in "Krusty Gets Busted" (1990).

Bob is presented as a spokesman for high culture in contrast to Krusty's lowbrow comedy. Kendra Whitmire places the Simpson family on the lowbrow side of the same divide. Media scholar Wanja von der Goltz describes Bart as "shaped by the television he watches" and therefore the main target of Bob's anger. After enduring Krusty's abusive routines, Bob frames him and takes over the show, replacing the clown's slapstick with readings of classic literature and segments about the emotional lives of preteens. Bob presents this programming as educational. Yet Arnold argues that Bob's "conscience and morality" are unaffected by the high culture he represents. His criminal schemes also seek to "manipulate the tastes of the masses".

Fink describes a contradiction in Bob's dependence on popular culture: he is disgusted by clowning and the low culture around him, yet his existence relies on that world. Von der Goltz argues that Bob's television career lets the series criticize the medium from within. He also sees Bob's inability to bring high culture into that career as a comment on The Simpsons' own literary and artistic references. Bob's hostility toward television becomes explicit in "Sideshow Bob's Last Gleaming", when he steals an atomic bomb and demands that Springfield end all broadcasts.

=== Intertextuality and performance ===
"Cape Feare" parodies both the 1962 film Cape Fear and its 1991 remake. The episode later became the basis for Anne Washburn's Mr. Burns, a Post-Electric Play. The play imagines "Cape Feare" as a piece of Western culture that survives an apocalypse. It opens with survivors reconstructing the episode from memory. Seven years later, the group runs an amateur theater company; after another 75 years, Mr. Burns has replaced Bob as the villain. Comparing the episode with the play, Hans Vermy sees Bob's conflict with Bart as a rivalry between theater and television. He describes Bob as a frustrated artist whose formal speech and yearning for theatrical tragedy and comedy contrast with his role as a sideshow clown. Bart represents both television's audience and its "champion". Bob wants Krusty's place in the spotlight, and Bart becomes a substitute target for his resentment. Vermy reads their conflict as a "competition between media: fatal contests for applause and audience".

Elsewhere in "Cape Feare", the parole board asks Bob why he has a tattoo that says "Die, Bart, Die". Bob replies that it is German for "the Bart, the". The joke depends on die also being a German definite article. (Note: According to Pilyarchuk, the pun can confuse even German viewers. The Ukrainian and Russian translations lose the double meaning.) The board accepts his explanation and releases him, declaring, "No one who speaks German can be an evil man." The episode also turns Bob's love of high culture against him: he agrees to perform the operetta H.M.S. Pinafore in its entirety to fulfill Bart's last request. The performance delays Bob long enough for the police to arrest him.

=== Design and continuity ===
Fink argues that Bob's appearance embodies his uneasy relationship with popular culture: his hair and oversized feet mark him as a clown and a cartoon character. A 2022 content-analysis thesis separately classifies Bob as a "crazy" loner portrayed with a physical disability. Fink argues that the character functions as "narrative prosthesis". (Note: Fink adopts the term from disability theorists David T. Mitchell and Sharon L. Snyder. They define "narrative prosthesis" as the use of disability to drive a story or encode a character's traits.) Yet his feet do not make him an outsider in the cartoon world of The Simpsons. They expose his disguise in "Krusty Gets Busted" and help him crush grapes in "The Italian Bob". What might be treated as a disability becomes, in Fink's words, "an ability rather than a normative deviance".

I mean, he casts a long shadow through the universe.

— Kelsey Grammer, on Bob's lasting appeal

Fink further connects Bob's design to his narrative function: his intermittent appearances, limited development, and repeated returns to prison make him a recurring device for setting up stories. By contrast, media scholars Amy M. Davis, Jemma Gilboy, and James Zborowski describe Bob as an exception to the series' floating timeline. Although animated characters in the series generally do not age, they write that Bob can "experience the passage of time and accumulate and retain an eventful history". They describe the Simpson family's experience as "eventfulness without progression". Bob's personal history instead persists between appearances: his son Gino grows from a toddler in "The Italian Bob" into an older child in "Funeral for a Fiend".

== Bibliography ==
- Arnold, David L. G. (December 8, 2003). "'Use a Pen, Sideshow Bob': The Simpsons and the Threat of High Culture". In Alberti, John (ed.). Leaving Springfield: The Simpsons and the Possibility of Oppositional Culture. Contemporary Film and Television Series. Detroit: Wayne State University Press. pp. 1–28. ISBN 978-0-8143-2849-1. OCLC 51323494. pp. 12–13: "Bob's own conscience and morality are clearly unaffected by the high culture he represents. ... manipulate the tastes of the masses."
- Bock, Charles (March 2013). "Rake's Progress". Harper's Magazine. "televised comedies weren't doing humor where the degree of repetition, the overlong extension of the joke, was the joke."
- Bradley, Ian (2016) [1996]. "Introduction" (PDF). In Bradley, Ian (ed.). The Complete Annotated Gilbert and Sullivan (20th anniversary ed.). New York: Oxford University Press. pp. x–xi. ISBN 978-0-19-939242-1. LCCN 2015037066. OCLC 925355179. "Bart, marooned on a houseboat, averts death at the hands of Sideshow Bob. ... By the time Bob's renditions are over, the boat has run aground and the police are on hand to apprehend him."
- Canning, Robert (December 2, 2009). "The Simpsons: Top 10 Sideshow Bob Episodes". IGN. Archived from the original on March 14, 2016. "the only ones I'd consider clunkers. These remaining episodes are all quite fun ... we're left with ten episodes to fill ten slots ... All the things we love ... were missing ... a whole lot of laughs ... Funeral for a Fiend ... The Italian Bob"
- Davis, Amy M.; Gilboy, Jemma; Zborowski, James (November 2015). "How Time Works in The Simpsons". Animation. 10 (3): 175–188. doi:10.1177/1746847715602403. ISSN 1746-8477. pp. 175, 181–184: "Bob is offered ... to experience the passage of time and accumulate and retain an eventful history. ... eventfulness without progression. ... Francesca and Gino stand by him, and they swear a vendetta against the Simpson family. ... his head to come just past their knees ... comes up to his mother's waist ... no longer those of a toddler. ... Whilst on a trip to Italy, the Simpsons end up stranded in the small Tuscan village of Salsiccia, where it turns out that Bob is the mayor. ... Bob is desperate that the family not reveal to his wife (and to the citizens of the town) that, in America, he is a criminal with a long and violent record. ... Bob has a son of toddler age, Gino, by his Italian wife, Francesca. ... Lisa becomes intoxicated during a town banquet and reveals Bob's criminal past. ... Bob loses his position as mayor. ... This is contrasted with the temporal experiences of the Simpsons themselves, for whom there is eventfulness without progression."
- EA Mobile (April 14, 2015). The Simpsons: Tapped Out (iOS and Android) (4.14 (“Terwilligers”) ed.). Electronic Arts. Level/area: Terwilligers event. "Sideshow Bob is back, and he's brought the whole family!"
- Farnell, Ian (2021). Contemporary British Theatre and Science Fiction: Staging the Final Frontier (PDF) (PhD thesis). University of Warwick. p. 65. "Cape Feare ... lampoons both the 1962 psychological crime film Cape Fear and its 1991 remake."
- Fink, Moritz (2013). "'People Who Look Like Things': Representations of Disability in The Simpsons" (PDF). Journal of Literary & Cultural Disability Studies. 7 (3): 255–270. doi:10.3828/jlcds.2013.23. ISSN 1757-6458. pp. 256, 261–262: "According to David Mitchell and Sharon Snyder, the imagery of disability in fictional text is a common trope ... what they call narrative prosthesis ... used by authors to drive a story forward ... a symbolic signifier responsible for the encoding of character traits ... an agent of high culture and intellectual enlightenment ... rendered an ability rather than a normative deviance. ... marked by his freak hair and oversized feet ... functions as narrative prosthesis ... huge feet do not make him an outsider ... practical device for crushing grapes ... Bob appears only occasionally on the show; his character does not develop and provides a theme for setting up a story ... is regularly "punished" for his immorality by being sent to Springfield Penitentiary ... Bob's feet were once the object of evidence after Bob had disguised himself as Krusty ... Though he is disgusted by being a clown and by the low culture that surrounds him ... Bob's existence is both based and dependent on popular culture ... elements that correspond to our cultural understanding of a clown and cartoon character"
- Fink, Moritz (2019). The Simpsons: A Cultural History. The Cultural History of Television (1st ed.). Lanham, Maryland: Rowman & Littlefield. pp. 99–100. ISBN 978-1-5381-1616-6. LCCN 2018053490. OCLC 1073034234. "a rivalry that may be viewed as an allusion to Warner Bros.' Wile E. Coyote unsuccessfully attempting to catch the Road Runner."
- von der Goltz, Wanja Matthias Freiherr (July 5, 2011). Functions of Intertextuality and Intermediality in The Simpsons (PDF). Faculty of Humanities (Dr. phil. thesis). University of Duisburg-Essen. pp. 28, 123–124: "critiquing ... from within that same medium ... inability to transport it into his television career ... comments on the show's own attempt ... include references to literature, sculpture, painting ... Sideshow Bob ... develops a fiendish plan to abolish television: he steals an atomic bomb and blackmails the city to turn off all broadcast. ... shaped by the television he watches ... main target of Sideshow Bob's anger because of what he represents"
- Groening, Matt (1997). Richmond, Ray; Coffman, Antonia (eds.). The Simpsons: A Complete Guide to Our Favorite Family (1st ed.). New York: Harper Perennial. ISBN 978-0-06-095252-5. LCCN 98141857. OCLC 37796735. OL 433519M. pp. 28–29: "Krusty Gets Busted"
- Matt Groening, Brad Bird, Jay Kogen, and Wallace Wolodarsky (commentators) (September 25, 2001). "Commentary for 'Krusty Gets Busted'". The Simpsons: The Complete First Season (DVD audio commentary). 20th Century Fox Home Entertainment. "When the script came out ... they were talking about getting James Earl Jones."
- Matt Groening, Al Jean, Mike Reiss, Julie Kavner, David Silverman, and Jon Vitti (commentators) (August 26, 2003). "Commentary for 'Black Widower'". The Simpsons: The Complete Third Season (DVD audio commentary). 20th Century Fox Home Entertainment. "we're gonna have him keep coming back, sort of like the Coyote continuing to try to get the Road Runner."
- Groening, Matt (October 26, 2010). Richmond, Ray; Gimple, Scott M.; McCann, Jesse L.; Seghers, Christine; Bates, James W. (eds.). Simpsons World: The Ultimate Episode Guide: Seasons 1–20 (1st ed.). New York: Harper. ISBN 978-0-06-171128-2. LCCN 2010526286. OCLC 676695317. pp. 207, 1183, 1193: "Robert Underdunk Terwilliger"
- Jean, Al (December 21, 2004). "Commentary for 'Cape Feare'". The Simpsons: The Complete Fifth Season (DVD audio commentary). 20th Century Fox Home Entertainment. "The reason there are so many was ... because the show was short ... add a couple more rakes hitting him."
- Ken Keeler, Josh Weinstein, Kelsey Grammer, and Pete Michels (commentators) (August 15, 2006). "Commentary for 'Brother from Another Series'". The Simpsons: The Complete Eighth Season (DVD audio commentary). 20th Century Fox Home Entertainment. "I'd been watching a lot of Frasier at the time ... the germ of the idea was ... what if we have Sideshow Bob's brother?"
- Kleinman, Jake (October 11, 2024). "How Sideshow Bob Became a Disney Villain". Inverse (Interview with Al Jean). "he loves to sing, which is one of the reasons he was cast as Bob by Sam Simon ... Sam had worked on Cheers ... we've had him sing pretty much every time he's been on ... Bob say, "Tired gag." ... I can't tell anybody else not to ... one reason the rake sequence got so long is the show was short ... I can add a little time here ... Sam Simon had always said ... if you do a joke and it's funny and then you repeat it and it's not funny, but then you keep coming back to it, it gets really funny ... that was the principle ... why did you decide to make Sideshow Bob the focus of this Halloween short? ... he loves to sing ... we thought him doing a Halloween version of "The Most Wonderful Time of the Year" would be great"
- Middleton, Alison (2021). "'Homer' Tackles Aeschylus: Theatrical Adaptation as Process in Anne Washburn's Mr Burns and Robert Icke's Oresteia" (PDF). Skenè: Journal of Theatre and Drama Studies. 7 (1): 169–194. ISSN 2421-4353. pp. 171, 180: "follows "Cape Feare" ... the tattoos of Simpsons' villain Sideshow Bob are influenced by ... The Night of the Hunter"
- Mirkin, David (August 16, 2005). "Commentary for 'Sideshow Bob Roberts'". The Simpsons: The Complete Sixth Season (DVD audio commentary). 20th Century Fox Home Entertainment. "Kelsey Grammer is one of the greatest joys to direct ... He works so hard. He's so funny."
- Motzkus, Peter (2020). "SIMPSONS, Inc. (?!)—A Very Short Fascicle on Music's Dramaturgy and Use in Adult Animation Series". Kieler Beiträge zur Filmmusikforschung. 15 (15): 65–114. doi:10.59056/kbzf.2020.15.p65-114. p. 80: "The leitmotif is derived from Bernard Herrmann's main theme music for CAPE FEAR."
- Bill Oakley, Josh Weinstein, and Dominic Polcino (commentators) (December 13, 2005). "Commentary for 'Sideshow Bob's Last Gleaming'". The Simpsons: The Complete Seventh Season (DVD audio commentary). 20th Century Fox Home Entertainment. "Sideshow Bob ... is one of the more complicated characters to write for ... he often speaks in such a highfalutin complicated way."
- Taylor, Blake (April 29, 2023). "Every Sideshow Bob Episode of The Simpsons, Ranked Worst to Best". /Film. "These new characters dimensionalize the longtime villain while retaining his essence as a bad guy 17 seasons into the series. ... Sideshow Bob marries Aunt Selma ... Bob tries to kill her ... Bart figures out the scheme ... Bob goes back to jail. ... intends to hypnotize Bart to kill Krusty ... Bob believes Bart to already be dead ... Bob ultimately sparing Bart ... the return not only of Bob's brother, Cecil, but also of his wife, Francesca, and son, Gino. ... first episode ... to feature Sideshow Bob as a main player ... in top form ... killing Bart, then bringing him back to life ... elevate the episode to hilarious heights ... mysterious someone with the initials "S.B." ... Sideshow Bob is the prime suspect ... seasonal Santa Claus at Santa's Village, an amusement park ... 6. Sideshow Bob Roberts ... one of his funniest qualities is failing every time he tries to kill Bart ... his change of heart apparently won't last."
- Tucker, Ken (February 7, 2003). "The Family Dynamic: At 300 episodes and counting, the Simpsons—TV's answer to the great American novel—continues to be a show about everything". Entertainment Weekly. No. 694. pp. 28–43. Archived from the original on October 18, 2014. "Kelsey Grammer's grand voice-performance as Sideshow Bob is Frasier pickled in arsenic. ... 3. CAPE FEARE ... genius in its repetitive stupidity."
- Turner, Chris (2004). Planet Simpson: How a Cartoon Masterpiece Documented an Era and Defined a Generation. Foreword by Douglas Coupland (1st ed.). Toronto: Random House Canada. ISBN 978-0-679-31318-2. OCLC 55682258. pp. 129–131: "a feast of mid-Atlantic anglophilia"
- Vermy, Hans (March 29, 2014). "The Lightest Distinction". InVisible Culture (20). University of Rochester. doi:10.47761/494a02f6.11bc1dc5. ISSN 1097-3710. pp. 13–14: "For Sideshow Bob, Bart Simpson epitomizes not only the viewer, but also the champion of television. ... competition between media: fatal contests for applause and audience. ... first meet Sideshow Bob as a dejected artist ... speaks with classical diction ... He loathes the popular chum of television and yearns for the gravitas of theatrical tragedy and comedy. ... cast into the role of sideshow clown ... inherit the spotlight ... substitute for Krusty"
- Wehner, Michael; Reinkunz, Sebastian; Flory, Isabel (March 16, 2009). "Civic Education with The Simpsons". Journal of Social Science Education. 7 (2): 86–97. doi:10.4119/jsse-444. p. 90: "He wins in a landslide, getting 100 percent of the vote."
- Whitmire, Kendra Ann (2012). The Uses of Shakespeare on American TV 1990–2010 (PDF). Shakespeare Institute, School of English, Drama and American & Canadian Studies (MPhil thesis). University of Birmingham. pp. 49, 96–98. pp. 49, 96–98: "He is an elitist who detests lowbrow culture ... stands for highbrow and the Simpson family ... lowbrow entertainment. ... an episode about the entire Sideshow Bob family that is characterized as snobby and elitist ... filled with intertextual meta-humour based upon Grammer's Frasier ... every part of Sideshow Bob's family playing a role"
