= The Fat Blue Line =

- The Simpsons episode
- Episode no.: Season 31; Episode 3
- Directed by: Mike Frank Polcino
- Written by: Bill Odenkirk
- Production code: YABF22
- Original air date: October 13, 2019

Guest appearances
- Bob Odenkirk as Fat Tony's lawyer; Joe Mantegna as Fat Tony; Jason Momoa as himself

Episode features
- Couch gag: The Simpson family arrives on stage on a recreation of Live Aid: Homer is Freddie Mercury, Lisa is John Deacon, Marge is Brian May, Bart is Roger Taylor and Maggie is the camera woman. Homer shouts "Day-oh!", the public shouts back, and then does a split and his pants rips apart, to which he D'ohes, and the public D'ohes back.

Episode chronology
← Previous "Go Big or Go Homer"	Next → "Treehouse of Horror XXX"
- The Simpsons season 31

"The Fat Blue Line" is the third episode of the thirty-first season of the American animated television series The Simpsons, and the 665th episode overall. It aired in the United States on Fox on October 13, 2019. The episode was directed by Mike Frank Polcino and written by Bill Odenkirk. The title is a pun of the law enforcement phrase The Thin Blue Line.

In this episode, Chief Wiggum helps Fat Tony prove his innocence when he is accused of robbing people. Bob Odenkirk guest starred as Fat Tony's lawyer. Actor Jason Momoa appeared as himself. The episode received positive reviews.

== Plot ==
The Simpson family goes to the San Castellaneta street festival, dedicated to the Italian culture, while Fat Tony meets with his uncle. Mayor Quimby introduces Jason Momoa who tells the story of Ignatius Castellaneta.

At the gathering of money for Jesus, the people at the festival were robbed. At the Police Station, Lenora Carter takes the case in hand, diminishing Chief Wiggum's job. As bait for the robber, Homer is taken, due to this big butt being the biggest in town, setting a wallet with a tracking device in his pocket.

After Homer is pickpocketed in the underground, the police follow the device to storage full of wallets when a door opens and Fat Tony and his uncle get framed being the culprit while Wiggum is depressed due to being put aside on the case.

At the Springfield Penitentiary (Sideshow Bob escapes from it but gets hit by a rake truck), Fat Tony prays to God to help him out of it while Wiggum on the other side prays to God to help him in his own situation, and Homer prays him to bring back plastic straws.

Louie brings in his lawyer, who constantly gets him out of guilty crimes, but he leaves upon hearing that he's innocent. Meanwhile, Wiggum watches an interview with Tony saying he'll never admit to pickpocketing. Wiggum says he will get him out if Tony can prove his innocence.

Tony shows him what he does every day at the time of the crime, singing in his room alone. Tony agrees to put on a wire and goes to Luigi's to find out who framed him. Frankie the Squealer reveals it was Johnny Tightlips who betrayed him and had become the Springfield Mafia boss. Homer enters the room by mistake when police intervene on the scene and is hit by a bullet in the butt. Wiggum sucks it out. At the Springfield General Hospital, Homer wakes up safe. At the station, Wiggum regains his confidence.

In the end, Fat Tony, Homer, and Wiggum share a toast on the successful operation at Giuseppe's.

== Production ==
The couch gag is a recreation of the performance of the band Queen at Live Aid featuring Homer as Freddie Mercury.

In July 2019, it was reported that Bob Odenkirk would guest star as a mob lawyer in an episode written by his brother Bill. The character would wear a pinkie ring as a nod to his Breaking Bad and Better Call Saul character, Saul Goodman. The same month, it was reported that Jason Mamoa would appear in the same episode as himself.

== Cultural references ==
The scene of the confrontation between Johnny Tightlips and Fat Tony is a parody of the final scene of the television series The Sopranos. Similarities include the Simpsons being in a restaurant similar to the one in the final scene, Maggie struggling to parallel park as Meadow Soprano did, the song "Don't Stop Believin'" by the band Journey playing in the background, and the cut to black.

Among the pictures of Chief Wiggum's mistakes is a photo of Pancho Billa, a Buffalo Bills fan whose real name is Ezra Castro, who died in May 2019 of pancreatic cancer.

== Reception ==
=== Viewing figures ===
The episode earned a 0.8 rating with a 4 share and was watched by 2.13 million viewers, which was the most watched show on Fox that night.

=== Critical response ===
Dennis Perkins of The A.V. Club gave the episode a B− stating, "Now, 'The Fat Blue Line' isn't one of those rare gems, sadly, but it's certainly possessed of some unalloyed warmth and affection for the characters and the subject matter thanks to one of the Simpsons vets whose name in the credits can at least guarantee an episode a decent shot, Bill Odenkirk. Odenkirk's scripts, as a rule eschew gimmickry and deadening self-referential exhaustion in favor of a stubborn professionalism. If this particular tale of Fat Tony being framed as Springfield's number one pickpocket (as opposed to being definitely guilty of being Springfield’s number one every other kind of crook) never rises above a sort of cozy familiarity, it at least earns its place as a Simpsons episode that seems to remember that The Simpsons is worth remembering."

Tony Sokol of Den of Geek rated this episode 4 out of 5 stars. He felt the episode was almost perfect and praised the humor. He also highlighted the music in the episode.
