= Clan of the Cave Mom =

- The Simpsons episode
- Episode no.: Season 35; Episode 13
- Directed by: Rob Oliver
- Written by: Brian Kelley
- Production code: 35ABF06
- Original air date: March 24, 2024

Guest appearance
- Kerry Washington as Rayshelle Peyton

Episode chronology
← Previous "Lisa Gets an F1"	Next → "Night of the Living Wage"
- The Simpsons season 35

"Clan of the Cave Mom" is the thirteenth episode of the thirty-fifth season of the American animated television series The Simpsons, and the 763rd episode overall. It aired in the United States on Fox on March 24, 2024. The episode was directed by Rob Oliver and written by Brian Kelley.

In this episode, Marge feuds with Luann after she upsets Bart while a mother protects her family from a wolf in the Ice Age. The scenes set in the Ice Age were animated in a different style than the Simpsons style of the present-day scenes, based on Primal by Genndy Tartakovsky. The episode received positive reviews.

== Plot ==
The Springfield Elementary School children are watching a documentary about the Ice Age with Marge as a chaperone. Later, when the children are eating, Milhouse invites Bart to a concert. He asks Marge for permission to go and says he will be responsible, but he and Milhouse immediately damage a museum display. Marge denies Bart. He asks Milhouse's mother, Luann, to convince Marge, but she also declines by saying that Bart is a bad influence on Milhouse. Marge is angered when she learns what Luann said. She confronts Luann, who says Bart is getting worse. To get even with her, Marge orders Homer to find tickets to the concert in the front row. Meanwhile, in the Ice Age, a human family is depicted. When the son becomes hungry, the mother hunts and kills a snake for food. Later, the boy is cornered by a wolf, and the mother stabs it and rescues him.

Homer searches online until he finds tickets. Bart persuades his classmates to go with him to the concert instead of Milhouse. Meanwhile, Lisa asks Marge not to act on her base instincts. Later, at a PTA meeting, Luann tries to remove Marge from its board. They insult each other and need to be physically restrained. Arriving at the concert, Marge's group is denied entry for using paper tickets instead of electronic ones. Seeing Luann's group enter, Marge charges past the gate with her car. In the Ice Age, the father pursues a deer until it is exhausted, and he kills it. Later, the wolf returns, but the mother attacks it. When the father arrives, the wolf destroys the family's home and leaves. They decide to journey to a cave in the mountains. On the way, the wolf kills the father. The mother charges at the wolf.

Marge's group evades the security guards and enters the arena. Bart says that Marge is frightening them, and she comes to her senses. She apologizes to Bart for her protective behavior, and she makes peace with Luann. In the Ice Age, the mother evades the wolf and runs away with her children. At the cave entrance, the wolf confronts them. A falling rock injures the wolf. Instead of killing it, the mother decides to rescue it and treat its wound. The family adopts it as a pet.

== Production ==
The Ice Age scenes were drawn in the style of the animated television series Primal. The creator of that series, Genndy Tartakovsky, acknowledged the homage on Instagram and responded with a drawing of Homer in the Primal style.

== Reception ==
=== Viewing figures ===
The episode earned a 0.17 rating with 0.69 million viewers, which was the most-watched show on Fox that night.

=== Critical response ===
John Schwarz of Bubbleblabber gave the episode a 10 out of 10. He thought it was the best episode in years and praised the ice age sequences.

Mike Celestino of Laughing Place thought the ice age metaphors were not completely clear and would have preferred to have more jokes. However, he liked that the show was taking chances outside the regular show structure.

Cathal Gunning of Screen Rant liked the serious nature of the ice age scenes that contrast the normal scenes. He thought it made the repetitive story of Marge competing with other mothers more interesting.
