= The Tell-Tale Pants =

- The Simpsons episode
- Episode no.: Season 35; Episode 16
- Directed by: Steven Dean Moore
- Written by: Al Jean
- Production code: 35ABF10
- Original air date: May 5, 2024

Guest appearance
- Kipp Lennon as Elton John

Episode features
- Couch gag: The Simpson family on the couch becomes a comic panel colored with Ben Day dots.

Episode chronology
← Previous "Cremains of the Day"	Next → "The Tipping Point"
- The Simpsons season 35

"The Tell-Tale Pants" is the sixteenth episode of the thirty-fifth season of the American animated television series The Simpsons, and the 766th episode overall. It aired in the United States on Fox on May 5, 2024. The episode was directed by Steven Dean Moore and written by Al Jean.

In this episode, Marge feels guilty after secretly selling Homer's pants but buys an expensive ring for herself after Homer inconsiderately goes to a baseball game without her. Kipp Lennon guest starred as Elton John. The episode received mixed reviews.

== Plot ==
The Simpson family attends an award show for the town's residents. Marge wins the award for Most Underappreciated Person, but she wakes up and realizes that the award show was a dream. Later, Marge brings Bart to the hospital after he breaks his fingers during a baseball game. She texts Homer for help, but he is at Moe's Tavern where Moe has purposely blocked cellular service. At the bar, Homer rips his pants. When he finally receives Marge's messages, he goes home to an angry Marge. He asks her to repair his pants. While she stitches up the rip, she watches a television show where she sees that a similar pair of pants is worth a great deal of money. She decides to sell the pants and tells Homer that she could not repair them.

Homer begins wearing sweatpants to work. Inspired by the film Oppenheimer, Mr. Burns builds a more powerful atomic pile. However, when an explosion is imminent, Homer, with his increased mobility from wearing sweatpants, rescues the power plant by taking out one of the bricks. Burns rewards Homer with two tickets to a baseball game. Meanwhile, Marge sells the pants and imagines what she can do with it. However, she thinks that it will be wasted if she spends it on her children. She also feels guilty about spending the money on herself, so she calls Homer to confess what she did. She learns that he is at a baseball game with a co-worker. Marge is angered that she was not invited because Homer assumed she would not go if asked. Homer feels guilty but cannot make up with her. Marge goes to a jewelry store and buys a ring with the money.

Marge feels guilty for buying the ring. She tries to hide the ring at home but is unable to find a suitable place. She leaves the ring by the front door and goes to bed. At Moe's, Homer continues to feel guilty. Moe tells him that he does not appreciate Marge. When he gets home, Homer finds the ring. Seeing what Marge does for him and their children, Homer puts the ring on her finger while she is asleep. She wakes up, and they forgive each other.

Later, the news reports that the gem on the ring is unethically made, so she decides to wear it only at home.

== Production ==
Musician Kipp Lennon guest starred as Elton John. Lennon previously appeared as the singing voice of Leon Kompowsky in the third season episode "Stark Raving Dad."

== Cultural references ==
Mr. Burns discusses the 2023 film Oppenheimer with Smithers as the inspiration for building an atomic pile and is surprised to learn that another film was released the same day, a reference to the Barbenheimer cultural phenomenon.

- The title is a reference to the 1843 short story The Tell-Tale Heart, its film adaptations and the season 1 episode The Telltale Head.
- The musical number, "She's A Mad Wife, Homer J." is a reference to the song based on the 1957 children's book How the Grinch Stole Christmas!, "You're a Mean One, Mr. Grinch"
- Duffman references the Bud Light controversy

== Reception ==
=== Viewing figures ===
The episode earned a 0.26 rating with 0.85 million viewers, which was the most-watched show on Fox that night.

=== Critical reception ===
John Schwarz of Bubbleblabber gave the episode a 6 out of 10, calling the episode's plot "all over the place" and "unoriginal", referring to it as "a bad mish mash of bad ideas that have been done previously".

Mike Celestino of Laughing Place gave the episode a more positive review, particularly praising the Mr. Burns and Smithers subplot.

Brandon Zachary of Screen Rant also thought the episode wasted time to set up the story. He also felt the episode should have added more to the Barbie side of the Barbenheimer joke.
