= Ae Bonny Romance =

- The Simpsons episode
- Episode no.: Season 35; Episode 8
- Directed by: Matthew Nastuk
- Written by: Michael Price
- Production code: 35ABF02
- Original air date: December 3, 2023

Guest appearances
- Karen Gillan as Maisie MacWeldon; Paul Higgins as Hamish MacWeldon and the Ticket Booth actor; David Tennant as Pa MacWeldon

Episode chronology
← Previous "It's a Blunderful Life"	Next → "Murder, She Boat"
- The Simpsons season 35

"Ae Bonny Romance" is the eighth episode of the thirty-fifth season of the American animated television series The Simpsons, and the 758th episode overall. It aired in the United States on Fox on December 3, 2023. The episode was directed by Matthew Nastuk and written by Michael Price.

In this episode, the Simpson family goes to Scotland to find Groundskeeper Willie and learns he is about to be married. Karen Gillan, Paul Higgins, and David Tennant guest star. The episode received positive reviews. This is the first episode of the season with the traditional closing credits and theme music.

== Plot ==
At Springfield Elementary School, the fourth-grade boys are learning to dance with girls. To prevent them from touching hands, Bart goes to the nurse's office to get bandages to wear on their hands. After applying them, they begin to feel intoxicated, and Bart sees that he had obtained nicotine patches. Although he claims innocence, Principal Skinner sends him to Groundskeeper Willie for punishment. When he learns what happened, Willie tells Bart about Maisie, whom Willie loved but did not join Willie in coming to America. They become friendly over their hatred of girls.

Meanwhile, Homer and Marge receive an invitation to a destination wedding. Homer protests, but Marge accepts and they plan to use their accumulated flyer miles to pay for airplane tickets.

When Willie goes missing, Bart receives a phone call from him in Edinburgh asking for help. He convinces Homer and Marge to take the family to help Willie with their flyer miles. In Edinburgh, the family finds Willie, who is about to marry Maisie.

Willie says that his phone call was misleading because it was interrupted by Maisie asking for a kiss. They explain that Maisie's family told her that Willie had been killed by a sheep, which is why she did not join him. She found Willie after she saw a video of him and Bart that they posted online. After talking, they decided to marry. Bart feels betrayed because he thought Willie hated girls.

As they participate in wedding activities, Homer and Marge argue because Homer dislikes destination weddings.

At the wedding rehearsal, Lisa tells Bart to be happy for Willie while a drunken Marge tells people how Homer is not romantic. Although Bart tries to be happy for Willie, he asks Bart to dance with girls, which causes Bart to throw the wedding cake out of a window.

Bart hears that Maisie's family is allowing Willie to get married to use his smelling ability to make them rich. Meanwhile, Homer is angry at Marge for talking about him.

Later, Homer sends Marge a video that he thinks that she would like. This causes the two to forgive each other.

At the wedding, Bart interrupts and tells Willie about Maisie's family's plans. Maisie says she did not know. To prove her love, she breaks Willie's nose to ruin his smelling ability. They get married and move into Willie's shack.

== Production ==
Karen Gillan guest starred as Maisie, a love interest for Groundskeeper Willie. She described the character as the role she "was born to play." Gillan previously expressed interest in appearing on the series. Paul Higgins guest starred as Hamish. Higgins also played the Ticket Booth actor. David Tennant was cast as Pa MacWeldon.

The Scottish band Belle and Sebastian appeared as themselves, playing their song "If You Find Yourself Caught in Love" during the wedding activity montage. They also performed the original song "Willie And The Dream Of Peat Bogs" over the end credits.

When the episode was rebroadcast in March 2024, the episode was dedicated to comedian Richard Lewis, who voiced the Male Golem in the eighteenth season episode "Treehouse of Horror XVII."

== Release ==
The episode aired simultaneously in all time zones in the United States at 8:30 PM ET/5:30 PM PT following a special episode of Krapopolis.

== Reception ==
=== Viewing figures ===
The episode earned a 0.59 rating with 2.04 million viewers, which was the second most-watched show on Fox that night.

=== Critical response ===
John Schwarz of Bubbleblabber gave the episode a 7.5 out of 10. He liked the Scottish jokes and guest stars. However, he thought the subplot of Homer and Marge's marital problems were repeats of previous stories.

Cathal Gunning of Screen Rant highlighted Bart's story of being blamed for a prank he unintentionally caused followed by his redemption. He also highlighted the mostly accurate depiction of Edinburgh.

Scottish viewers thought that the portrayal of Edinburgh and the Edinburgh Festival Fringe was accurate.
