= Cremains of the Day =

- The Simpsons episode
- Episode no.: Season 35; Episode 15
- Directed by: Gabriel DeFrancesco
- Written by: John Frink
- Production code: 35ABF09
- Original air date: April 21, 2024

Guest appearance
- Joe Mantegna as Fat Tony

Episode chronology
← Previous "Night of the Living Wage"	Next → "The Tell-Tale Pants"
- The Simpsons season 35

"Cremains of the Day" is the fifteenth episode of the thirty-fifth season of the American animated television series The Simpsons, and the 765th episode overall. It aired in the United States on Fox on April 21, 2024. The episode was directed by Gabriel DeFrancesco and written by John Frink.

In this episode, Homer and his friends try to honor a barfly, named Larry Dalrymple, after he dies suddenly at the tavern. Except for still images, Maggie Simpson does not appear in this episode. The episode received positive reviews.

== Plot ==
Homer, Lenny, and Carl are watching football at Moe's Tavern. Another regular, Larry, is also at the bar. They encourage Moe to gamble on a game, but he loses. Angered, he tells them to leave, but they see that Larry has died. They attend Larry's funeral where Larry's mother encourages them to talk about him. They make up a story and realize that they know nothing about him, which makes them feel guilty. Afterwards, Larry's mother shows them his drawing of all of them in front of a waterfall. Lenny suggests they take Larry's ashes to the waterfall.

On the way, the group rests at a motel where they debate what the afterlife is like and what Larry is doing there. The next day, Homer accidentally knocks over the urn containing Larry's ashes. Homer and Moe discover sapphires with his ashes, and Moe thinks that Larry was smuggling them inside his body. Moe tells Homer to keep it a secret. Back on the road, Lenny decides to speed up, which knocks Larry's urn out of their truck. His ashes and the sapphires spill out. Lenny and Carl discover Homer and Moe's secret, and Moe lies and blames Homer for trying to keep it from them. As they argue, a sheriff arrests them for smuggling jewels and takes the urn.

The group continues to argue in the trunk of the sheriff's truck. The sheriff calls his real boss Fat Tony to report that he has the sapphires where his real name is revealed to be Mickey No-Loose-Ends. Tony tells Mickey to let the group go as they don't know what the sapphires are for. While noting that he's got to pay more attention to the nicknames of his gangsters, Fat Tony sends a gangster named Bruno Wife-Banger to pick up Connie D'Amico at the airport as he quotes "Hey, with pleasure". Mickey decides to kill them to leave no witnesses. Hearing this, the group apologizes to each other. Homer finds a flare gun in the trunk. When Mickey opens the trunk, Homer shoots and misses. The recoil sends the truck over a cliff. Lenny, Carl, and Moe jump from the trunk onto a ledge, but Homer and the truck continue down the cliff. A falling branch knocks out Mickey which causes Larry's urn to roll down the cliff. The urn ends up lodged between the truck's tire and wheel well, stopping the truck so Homer can escape. The group arrives at the waterfall, but it looks nothing like the drawing.

They take Larry's urn back to Moe's Tavern where it is placed under a moving picture of a waterfall. They wonder about the fate of the sapphires, and it is revealed that Moe swallowed them.

== Production ==
The character of Larry had appeared since the first episode of The Simpsons and was voiced by Harry Shearer, who voices the other characters Mr. Burns and Waylon Smithers, even though he only had two lines of dialogue over the course of the series. Executive producer Tim Long said that the producers wanted Larry's death to emotionally impact viewers despite being a background character. After the episode aired, Long apologized and remarked that the reaction of the fans proves that people are still invested in the series. On why Sam, Larry's companion at Moe's, was absent in the episode, showrunner Matt Selman tweeted that the writers originally considered to add a throwaway line as a joke about where Sam was during Larry's funeral, but desisted due to having already done so to explain Barney Gumble's absence. He explained that Sam couldn't join the gang in their road trip as his participation would have essentially meant introducing a new yet old character in a way that would have turned the plot into a different story than what they had envisioned. In retrospective, Selman admitted they could have included Sam nonetheless in a nonspeaking cameo appearance in the funeral.

== Reception ==
=== Viewing figures ===
The episode earned a 0.25 rating with 0.97 million viewers, which was the most-watched show on Fox that night.

=== Critical response ===
John Schwarz of Bubbleblabber gave the episode an 8.5 out of 10. He liked jokes and sight gags, and he also enjoyed the scene of the characters theorizing about life after death. However, he thought the voices of Lenny and Carl did not sound normal.

Mike Celestino of Laughing Place thought it was notable that the show killed a minor character. He also liked seeing the group from Moe's in another setting.

=== Awards and nominations ===
Series regular Hank Azaria was nominated for the Primetime Emmy Award for Outstanding Character Voice-Over Performance at the 76th Primetime Creative Arts Emmy Awards for his performance as Moe Szyslak in this episode. Writer John Frink was nominated for the Writers Guild of America Award for Television: Animation at the 77th Writers Guild of America Awards for his script for this episode.
