= McMansion & Wife =

- The Simpsons episode
- Episode no.: Season 35; Episode 3
- Directed by: Debbie Bruce Mahan
- Written by: Dan Vebber
- Production code: OABF20
- Original air date: October 22, 2023

Guest appearance
- Dick Van Dyke as himself

Episode features
- Couch gag: At the power plant, Homer receives a text message from Marge to come home. He gets into a luxury sports car. He uses the car's controls to change his appearance, obtain goat milk, and fly home. He arrives at home and sits on the couch. Marge says they are out of food, and Santa's Little Helper was sprayed by a skunk. Homer then wakes up from his dream at the power plant.

Episode chronology
← Previous "A Mid-Childhood Night's Dream"	Next → "Thirst Trap: A Corporate Love Story"
- The Simpsons season 35

"McMansion & Wife" is the third episode of the thirty-fifth season of the American animated television series The Simpsons, and the 753rd episode overall. It aired in the United States on Fox on October 22, 2023. The episode was directed by Debbie Bruce Mahan and written by Dan Vebber.

In this episode, Homer and Marge befriend their new neighbors while Nelson intensifies his bullying at school. The episode received mixed reviews.

The episode was dedicated in memory of Suzanne Somers.

== Plot ==
The Simpson family visits their new neighbors, Thayer and Anne. Thayer owns a luxury sports car dealership. They invite Homer and Marge to spend time with them. Homer enjoys their company and agrees to let Thayer and Anne to make alterations to their home. However, Homer and Marge become upset when they find out that Thayer and Anne are performing a noisy full remodel of their home. Meanwhile, a presentation at Springfield Elementary School intended to curb bullying convinces Nelson to intensify his bullying instead.

Homer confronts Thayer at his car dealership, and he lets Homer borrow a luxury sports car as an apology. Meanwhile, Bart is afraid that Nelson will bully him, but Lisa has prevented Nelson from bullying the students by uploading humiliating videos of Nelson that cause the students to laugh at him.

Later, Nelson bullies Bart, and Lisa goes to upload a video of Nelson. However, Nelson has forced Hubert Wong to block Lisa from uploading videos. Although Lisa and Hubert attempt to outwit each other with their computer skills, they call a truce when they realize their activities would look bad when applying for colleges. Meanwhile, Thayer and Anne's house has become a mansion that blocks sunlight from reaching the Simpson house. Lisa and Hubert resolve the issue when they discover that their street is a historical site, so the house cannot be remodeled.

In the future, the Simpson house has become a historical museum about the family and the town.

== Production ==
Dick Van Dyke appeared as himself, and Rosalie Chiang was cast as the new voice of Hubert Wong. The character was previously voiced by Tress MacNeille. In 2020, the producers stated that white actors would no longer voice non-white characters.

The episode was dedicated in memory of Suzanne Somers. Somers appeared in the seventh season episode "The Day the Violence Died."

== Controversy ==
In the episode, Homer comments about how strangling Bart gave him a firm handshake, but he no longer does it because of changing cultural norms. The depiction of Homer choking Bart dates back to the shorts featured on The Tracey Ullman Show. Some viewers reacted by praising Homer's evolution while others thought Homer's character should not be changing. Viewers also noticed that the act of Homer choking Bart had not been featured since the thirty-first season episode "The Winter of Our Monetized Content." The show previously acknowledged the violence of the act in the twenty-second season episode "Love Is a Many Strangled Thing." It also called the act "child abuse" in the eleventh season episode "Behind the Laughter."

The producers responded with a drawing of Homer strangling Bart with Homer calling the controversy "clickbaiting." Executive producer James L. Brooks denied that the show would alter Homer's behavior.

== Reception ==
=== Viewing figures ===
The episode earned a 0.30 rating with 1.06 million viewers, which was the most-watched show on Fox that night.

=== Critical reception ===
John Schwarz of Bubbleblabber gave the episode a 5 out of 10. He thought both main stories were repeats of previous episodes. He liked the episode's reference to the 1990 film Goodfellas.

Cathal Gunning of Screen Rant thought the episode effectively connected the couch gag into the main story. He thought it was a demonstration of the more experimental elements of the show in its later seasons.
