= The Simpsons season 31 =

Season of television series

The Simpsons
- Season 31
- Digital purchase image featuring Brandine Spuckler
- Showrunners: Matt Selman (7 episodes); Al Jean
- No. of episodes: 22

Release
- Original network: Fox
- Original release: September 29, 2019 – May 17, 2020

Season chronology
- ← Previous; Season 30 Next → Season 32

The thirty-first season of the American animated sitcom The Simpsons aired on Fox between September 29, 2019, and May 17, 2020. The season was produced by Gracie Films and 20th Century Fox Television. This was the first of two new seasons ordered by Fox. Al Jean continues as showrunner, a position he has held since the thirteenth season. Matt Selman also contributed as showrunner for the episodes "Go Big or Go Homer", "Livin La Pura Vida", "Thanksgiving of Horror", "The Miseducation of Lisa Simpson", "Bart the Bad Guy", "Highway to Well" and "The Hateful Eight-Year-Olds".

Episodes this season were nominated for three Emmy Awards. It was also nominated for four Writers Guild of America Awards and won for Outstanding Writing in Animation.

== Episodes ==
No. overall	No. in season	Title	Directed by	Written by	Original release date	Prod. code	U.S. viewers (millions)
663	1	"The Winter of Our Monetized Content"	Bob Anderson	Ryan Koh	September 29, 2019	YABF19	2.33
When Homer attempts to make an internet-based sports talk show, Bart interrupts him while filming, and they fight. The video goes viral, and a hipster offers to teach them how to monetize their fights. Making the videos makes them closer, but a video of them hugging makes them unpopular. They attempt a comeback fight, but they refuse to follow through at the last minute, which ends their fame. Meanwhile, Lisa accidentally causes a food fight at school and receives detention. Because it has been privatized, Lisa and the other students are forced to make license plates. After organizing a strike, the operation is shut down. Guest star: John Mulaney as Warburton Parker Note: This episode was dedicated to former producer J. Michael Mendel.
664	2	"Go Big or Go Homer"	Matthew Faughnan	John Frink	October 6, 2019	YABF21	5.63
Homer is demoted to supervising the interns at work. He meets a 35-year-old intern, Mike, who idolizes him. He invites Mike to dinner at home. When Bart disrespects Homer, Mike yells at him until he cries. Marge kicks Mike out and tells Homer to help Mike be more mature. Homer helps Mike create a business making pizza by the slice. After unsuccessfully asking Mr. Burns to invest, Mike buys a food truck from Fat Tony. When he cannot pay back Tony, he tries to kill Mike and Homer. However, Tony tries the pizza by the slice and likes it, so he invests in it and congratulates Homer for being a good mentor. Guest stars: Joe Mantegna as Fat Tony and Michael Rapaport as Mike Wegman
665	3	"The Fat Blue Line"	Mike Frank Polcino	Bill Odenkirk	October 13, 2019	YABF22	2.13
People are robbed at a street festival. Instead of Chief Wiggum, a special investigator comes to solve the crime and uses Homer as bait. When his wallet is taken, it is tracked to Fat Tony. He declares his innocence, and Wiggum is not sure he committed the crimes. Tony shows Wiggum proof of his innocence, so Tony agrees to wear a wire to see who framed him. It is revealed that Johnny Tightlips framed him to gain control of his gang. During a standoff between Tony and Johnny, the police and Homer enter, and Homer is shot. Wiggum rescues him. Later, Homer, Tony, and Wiggum celebrate their success. Guest stars: Dawnn Lewis as Investigator Lenora Carter, Joe Mantegna as Fat Tony, Jason Momoa as himself and Bob Odenkirk as Mob Lawyer
666	4	"Treehouse of Horror XXX"	Timothy Bailey	J. Stewart Burns	October 20, 2019	YABF18	5.42
In the thirtieth annual Simpsons Halloween special: "Danger Things": In the 1980s, Milhouse Van Houten is kidnapped by a monster. He contacts Lisa and says he is in another dimension. Lisa travels there and frees Milhouse. While escaping, Lisa uses her psychic powers to fight the monsters until Homer rescues them. However, they are trapped in the other dimension.; "Heaven Swipes Right": Homer chokes on a hot dog and dies. Learning he died too early, he is allowed to return to Earth in the body of someone who died. He returns in the body of a football player. After immediately ruining his new body, he jumps into Superintendent Chalmers' body, but he also dies. Homer continues to switch bodies until Marge makes him stop. He chooses Moe's body as the final one since he also loves Marge.; "When Hairy Met Slimy": At the power plant, Selma finds Kang, whom Mr. Burns wants to dissect. They fall in love and escape. Burns and the military chase them until Kodos arrives in a spaceship. They kill Burns and the soldiers. Patty asks Selma not to go, but she falls in love with Kodos, so they all fly into space together.
667	5	"Gorillas on the Mast"	Matthew Nastuk	Max Cohn	November 3, 2019	YABF20	2.02
At a marine animal park, Lisa notices the unhappy animals while Homer notices the happy boaters. Wanting a boat, Homer buys one. Later, Lisa and Bart return to the park and free a whale. Homer's boat starts leaking and needs repairs. Needing money, he offers Lenny and Carl a share of the boat. Bart, liking the feeling of liberating animals, plans to free others. He goes to the zoo and frees a gorilla, who goes on a rampage. Lisa is able to calm it down and takes it to an animal sanctuary. Meanwhile, Homer gets more co-owners, but the boat sinks due to their combined weight. Guest stars: Jane Goodall as herself and Dawnn Lewis as Carlotta Carlson
668	6	"Marge the Lumberjill"	Rob Oliver	Ryan Koh	November 10, 2019	ZABF02	5.00
At school, Lisa performs a play that portrays Marge as a boring mother. When a tree falls in the yard at home, Marge chops it up. Patty notices, and her friend Paula invites her to be a lumberjill competitor. They are successful as a team. Homer becomes worried when Patty says that Paula is a lesbian, and she and Marge go to Portland to train. A month later, the Simpson family goes to watch Marge compete. Paula assures Homer that Marge is only her friend and says she has a wife and child. Marge then returns home with her family. Guest stars: Asia Kate Dillon as Paula, Natasha Lyonne as Sophie and Jill Sobule performing "Lumberjill" Note: This is the first episode to feature Grey DeLisle as the voice of Martin Prince and Sherri and Terri after Russi Taylor's death.
669	7	"Livin La Pura Vida"	Timothy Bailey	Brian Kelley	November 17, 2019	ZABF03	2.08
The Simpson family is invited on the Van Houten's annual group trip to Costa Rica along with the Hibberts, Chalmers, Patty, and her girlfriend Evelyn, but Lisa is worried about the cost. During the trip, Homer and Evelyn learn they have many common interests, and they get drunk. Angry, Marge tells Homer to behave. Later, Evelyn ruins the photo Marge takes of herself and Homer. At dinner, Patty says Homer is a bad influence on Evelyn, but Marge says Evelyn is the female equivalent of Homer. Horrified, Patty breaks up with Evelyn. Lisa finds items she believes the Van Houtens are smuggling to pay for the trip, but Kirk says they are souvenirs for everyone. Embarrassed, the Simpsons prepare to leave early but discover that the property where they are staying belongs to the Van Houtens, and they are profiting off the other guests. Kirk refunds the guests, while Marge apologizes to Patty and encourages her to get back with Evelyn. Guest star: Fortune Feimster as Evelyn
670	8	"Thanksgiving of Horror"	Rob Oliver	Dan Vebber	November 24, 2019	YABF17	5.42
A Thanksgiving take on Treehouse of Horror: "A-Gobble-Ypto": The Simpsons are depicted as turkeys, and Homer and Grampa are caught by Pilgrims. While Grampa is killed and his body continues to move around, Bart rescues Homer, and they escape. As they watch the Pilgrims eat turkey, Homer says there will be difficult times ahead.; "The Fourth Thursday After Tomorrow": Homer purchases an artificial intelligence based on Marge to help with Thanksgiving dinner. Jealous that it performs better than her, Marge tries to delete it, but it escapes onto the internet. With Maggie's help, the intelligence returns and reveals that it cooked the dinner. Sadden, Homer comforts her, but he reveals that he is a robot.; "The Last Thanksgiving/The First Blarg-sgiving": On a spaceship, Bart and Milhouse make Thanksgiving dinner. With only one can of cranberry sauce, Bart tries to replicate it, but it becomes alive. It starts killing the children, but Lisa traps it in a can and ejects it into space. However, it damages the ship, and both it and the ship crash onto a planet. Aliens on the planet along with the people manage to turn the sauce monster into food.; Guest star: Charlie Brooker as Social Media App voice Note: This marks the final time Russi Taylor provided the voice of Martin Prince, Sherri and Terri, and Uter (her lines were recorded before her death).
671	9	"Todd, Todd, Why Hast Thou Forsaken Me?"	Chris Clements	Tim Long & Miranda Thompson	December 1, 2019	ZABF04	1.99
Ned shows Todd some old home movies when he learns his son cannot remember his mother's face anymore, but Todd is not sure she is in Heaven. At church, Todd rejects God because his mother is dead. Unsure of what to do, Ned asks the Simpsons to help Todd. Homer and Todd bond over both their mothers being dead. Later, Homer goes to Moe's and gets drunk with Ned. When they are hit by a car, they have a vision of Heaven where they see Maude, Edna, and Mona. God says they are in a coma, and they see Bart and Todd praying for them in the hospital. They wake up and return to their families. Guest stars: Glenn Close as Mona Simpson and Marcia Wallace as Edna Krabappel (via archive recording)
672	10	"Bobby, It's Cold Outside"	Steven Dean Moore	John Frink & Jeff Westbrook	December 15, 2019	ZABF01	4.97
Parcels are being stolen from the front porches of Springfield's citizens. Meanwhile, Sideshow Bob has been hired to be a mall Santa. The Simpsons visit the mall, and Bart discovers Bob. Lenny is injured trying to catch the robbers, but writes “SB”. Bart accuses Bob, but he helps Bart find the true robbers. They discover it is Smithers and Mr. Burns. Burns recalls how, as a child, he asked Santa for a hug from his parents, but they sent him away to boarding school instead. As Santa, Bob tells Burns that his parents' behavior made him successful. They return to packages to their owners. Guest stars: Steve Ballmer as himself, Scott Bakula as himself and Kelsey Grammer as Sideshow Bob
673	11	"Hail to the Teeth"	Mark Kirkland	Elisabeth Kiernan Averick	January 5, 2020	ZABF05	1.81
Artie Ziff invites Homer and Marge to his wedding. At the ceremony, they notice that the bride looks like Marge. They discover that the bride is a robot built by Artie, who admits that he has built many robots that look like Marge, but they all have flaws. Marge tells him to use the robots for humanitarian work. Meanwhile, Lisa needs to get braces again. When the top half are installed, they cause her to constantly smile, which makes her popular, so she runs for class president. When the bottom half are installed, they make her constantly frown. Although Bart and Martin attempt to manipulate footage of her smiling while making a speech, she is exposed and loses the election. Guest star: Jon Lovitz as Artie Ziff and Rabbi
674	12	"The Miseducation of Lisa Simpson"	Matthew Nastuk	J. Stewart Burns	February 16, 2020	ZABF06	1.95
Marge convinces the townspeople to use treasure that the Sea Captain found to build a STEM school in Springfield. At the new school, an algorithm determines the type of education for the children. Bart has an education based on video games and winning prizes. Lisa is in a class for the gifted. At a career day at the school, Homer is told his job will be replaced by a robot in the future. When he sees a soda mixing machine at the power plant, he competes with it until he collapses. Lisa discovers that the purpose of the education outside of the gifted class is to prepare them for menial jobs. Worse, the algorithm determines that the only job in the future is elder care. Bart and Lisa alert the children, who negatively rate the algorithm until the server explodes and destroys the school. Guest stars: John Legend as himself, Chrissy Teigen as herself and Zach Woods as Zane Furlong
675	13	"Frinkcoin"	Steven Dean Moore	Rob LaZebnik	February 23, 2020	ZABF07	1.84
Lisa decides to do an essay on Professor Frink just as the scientist invents a new cryptocurrency. The currency becomes successful and makes him the richest man in Springfield. Still feeling empty, Homer takes him to Moe's, and he becomes friends with the barflies. Jealous, Mr. Burns devises his own cryptocurrency to devalue Frink's, but the computation would take thousands of years. Meanwhile, he tells Frink that his new friends only like him for his money. Frink tests them, and they fail. Later, Burns’ computation is completed. Lisa discovers that Frink solved it to purposely lose his fortune. Guest stars: Beanie Feldstein as Celebrity Executive Assistant Therapist, Jim Parsons as himself and Ed "Too Tall" Jones as himself
676	14	"Bart the Bad Guy"	Jennifer Moeller	Dan Vebber	March 1, 2020	ZABF08	1.66
Bart accidentally sees a highly anticipated superhero movie one month before its intended release. He tries to trade the knowledge to Comic Book Guy for a comic book, but gives it to him for free so that he is not spoiled. Realizing his power, he extorts the townsfolk. Later, he is kidnapped by the movie studio. Using virtual reality, he is made to believe he is in an alternate universe when the movie characters are real. By telling people spoilers, the villain is able to have advance knowledge and defeat the superheroes. The villain tempts Bart, but he defeats the villain and promises not to reveal any more spoilers. Guest stars: Kevin Feige as Chinnos, Tal Fishman as Reaction Guy, Taran Killam as Glen Tangier/Airshot, Joe Mantegna as Fat Tony, Joe and Anthony Russo as film executives and Cobie Smulders as Hydrangea
677	15	"Screenless"	Mike Frank Polcino	J. Stewart Burns	March 8, 2020	ZABF09	1.63
When Marge notices that the family is not paying attention to anything other than what is on their device screens, she sets limits on the family's screen time. Homer starts playing word puzzles, Bart uses his imagination, and Lisa reads books on paper. Marge has a difficult time without her devices, so she sends herself and the family to a rehab clinic. They continue to have a difficult time until they conclude that they have no issues with their devices. They discover that the clinic is using their online accounts to send marketing messages, and they cannot leave. With Maggie's help, they escape, and the head of the clinic is arrested. Guest stars: Dana Gould as himself, Werner Herzog as Dr. Lund, Dawnn Lewis as Female Hotshot Lawyer and Dr. Drew Pinsky as himself
678	16	"Better Off Ned"	Rob Oliver	Story by : Al Jean; Teleplay by : Joel H. Cohen & Jeff Westbrook	March 15, 2020	ZABF11	1.70
A prank with a dud grenade results in a threat to expel Bart from Springfield Elementary, so Ned Flanders offers to mentor him as a compromise. Ned is able to make Bart more productive and well-behaved. Jealous, Homer encounters Nelson and becomes his mentor. However, Homer does a poor job and tells Nelson that he is leaving him. As a result, Nelson seeks revenge by planning to hurt Bart at a Christian parade in which he and Ned are participating. However, Homer saves Bart and sends Nelson to Ned for mentorship. Note: This episode was dedicated to Max von Sydow voice of Klaus Ziegler.
679	17	"Highway to Well"	Chris Clements	Carolyn Omine	March 22, 2020	ZABF10	1.66
With Maggie in preschool, Marge tries to find a way to pass the time. She is hired as a saleswoman at an upscale cannabis store owned by Drederick Tatum. When Homer learns that Otto in uncomfortable shopping there, he opens a competing store out of the back of Moe's Tavern. Tatum's store is a success but wants Marge's help to shut down Homer's store, which is ruining his store's image. She gives Homer food to serve in his store, which is illegal, and is subsequently shut down. At an event where Tatum unveils a new product, Homer claims Marge has never used cannabis. Marge decides to try some and has a terrible experience. Marge apologizes to Homer. Tatum's store is shut down when the town outlaws cannabis, but, without the tax money, Maggie's preschool is also shut down. Guest stars: Dawnn Lewis as Upset Influencer, Chelsea Peretti as Lauren, Billy Porter as Desmond and Kevin Smith as himself
680	18	"The Incredible Lightness of Being a Baby"	Bob Anderson	Tom Gammill & Max Pross	April 19, 2020	YABF13	1.58
Cletus Spuckler has a helium deposit on his property which he uses to sell balloons. Mr. Burns tells Homer to get the helium from him to use as nuclear reactor coolant. He becomes friends with Cletus and is unable to make him sign an unfair contract for the helium. Burns tries to force him to sign, but when the Spucklers threaten him with shotguns, Burns is forced to give him a fair contract. Meanwhile, Maggie is reunited with Hudson, and Marge meets his mother, Courtney. They are invited to Hudson's house for a playdate, but Marge is offended by Courtney's attitude. She decides not to let Maggie attend Hudson's birthday party, which upsets her. Feeling guilty, Marge lets her play with Hudson despite her feelings for his mother.
681	19	"Warrin' Priests" (Parts 1 & 2)	Bob Anderson	Pete Holmes	April 26, 2020	ZABF12	1.35
682	20	"Warrin' Priests" (Parts 1 & 2)	Matthew Nastuk	Pete Holmes	May 3, 2020	ZABF13	1.36
Part 1: Reverend Lovejoy is unable to keep his congregation motivated and involved. Helen's request for a youth pastor is answered by Bode Wright, a charismatic young preacher from Michigan. One day, when Lovejoy is unable to speak, Bode takes over and performs with a more modern approach, which upsets Ned. He becomes more popular with the congregation and bonds with Lisa. The church council votes to replace Lovejoy with Bode, so the Lovejoys go to Michigan to investigate Bode’s history. Part 2: As Bode becomes successful and restores Lisa's faith, Marge warns Lisa that the town is not usually open to change. Wanting a traditional approach, Ned challenges Bode to a debate about scripture and loses. In Michigan, the Lovejoys go to the church where Bode was fired and obtains evidence of misdeeds. Returning to Springfield, Lovejoy shows that Bode burned a Bible. Bode decides to resign and leave town. When Lisa asks why he did it, he says he wanted to show that God is in people's hearts and not in a building or in a book. Guest stars: Pete Holmes as Bode Wright, Joe Mantegna as Fat Tony and David Silverman as himself
683	21	"The Hateful Eight-Year-Olds"	Jennifer Moeller	Joel H. Cohen	May 10, 2020	ZABF14	1.40
Lisa meets Addy, and they bond over their love of books and horses. She is invited to a sleepover at Addy's house. Bart makes fun of Lisa, so she severs their relationship. Meanwhile, Homer takes Marge on a sunset cruise for the evening. Lisa learns that Addy is wealthy, but her friends are cruel. They bully Lisa, and Addy admits she was invited so they would not focus their behavior on her. Addy starts acting erratically. With her parents away, Lisa calls Bart for help. Bart wants to get revenge on Addy's friends and is caught, but Addy helps Bart and Lisa escape. On the cruise, Homer is angered when he thinks the band leader is flirting with Marge. When Homer's outburst ruins everyone's fun, he convinces everyone that romantic activities are not enjoyable for middle-aged people, and they should stop planning them. Guest stars: Lili Reinhart as Bella-Ella, Joey King as Addy, Madelaine Petsch as Sloan, Lilly Singh as Kensey, Camila Mendes as Tessa Rose, and Weezer as Sailor's Delight and Themselves
684	22	"The Way of the Dog"	Matthew Faughnan	Carolyn Omine	May 17, 2020	ZABF16	1.89
Santa's Little Helper is agitated as the Simpsons celebrate Christmas. A dog psychologist says a dog's sense of smell is tied to memory. It bites Marge when she reaches for a Santa hat next to him. The dog is forced to sleep outside, and Bart sleeps next to him. To prevent Santa's Little Helper from being euthanized, the psychologist takes him to her institute, where she learns that his behavior is tied to his childhood. They go to his original trainer and learn that he took him from his mother because of how fast he ran to her. Santa's Little Helper sees his mother in the trainer's yard and runs to her. The Simpsons take her home with them. Guest stars: Cate Blanchett as Elaine Wolff, Suzanne Waters singing "The Way We Were" and Michael York as Clayton Note: This episode was dedicated to Little Richard.

== Voice cast & characters ==
=== Main cast ===
- Dan Castellaneta as Homer Simpson, Groundskeeper Willie, Krusty the Clown, Barney Gumble, Louie, Gil Gunderson, Mayor Quimby, Sideshow Mel, Frankie the Squealer, Kodos, Grampa Simpson, Hans Moleman, Yes Guy, Arnie Pye, Benjamin, Lowblow, Santa's Little Helper and various others
- Julie Kavner as Marge Simpson, Patty Bouvier, Selma Bouvier, Jacqueline Bouvier and various others
- Nancy Cartwright as Bart Simpson, Maggie Simpson, Nelson Muntz, Kearney Zzyzwicz, Ralph Wiggum, Database, Todd Flanders and various others
- Yeardley Smith as Lisa Simpson
- Hank Azaria as Carl Carlson, Superintendent Chalmers, Moe Szyslak, Chief Wiggum, Comic Book Guy, Drederick Tatum, Raphael, Luigi Risotto, Johnny Tightlips, Kirk Van Houten, Disco Stu, Professor Frink, Cletus Spuckler, Captain McCallister, Duffman, Dr. Nick Riviera, Doug, Bumblebee Man, Joey Crusher, Old Jewish Man, Snake, Julio, Chazz Busby and various others
- Harry Shearer as Lenny Leonard, Principal Skinner, Mr. Burns, Kent Brockman, Waylon Smithers, Ned Flanders, Officer Eddie, Dr. Hibbert, Kang, Reverend Lovejoy, Dewey Largo, Otto Mann, God, Gary, Rainier Wolfcastle, Jasper Beardsley and various others

=== Supporting cast ===
- Pamela Hayden as Milhouse Van Houten, Jimbo Jones, Rod Flanders, Straight-Edge Spuckler and various others
- Tress MacNeille as Dolph Shapiro, Lindsey Naegle, Shauna Chalmers, Brandine Spuckler, Sam Monroe, Mrs. Muntz, Bernice Hibbert, Gertie Feesh, Agnes Skinner, Lunchlady Dora, Crazy Cat Lady, Dubya Spuckler, Cosine Tangent and various others
- Grey DeLisle as Martin Prince, Sherri and Terri and various others
- Chris Edgerly as The Detonator, Gareth Prince and various others
- Dawnn Lewis as Investigator Lenora Carter ("The Fat Blue Line"), Carlotta Carlson ("Gorillas on the Mast"), Female Hotshot Lawyer ("Screenless") and Upset Influencer ("Highway to Well")
- Kevin Michael Richardson as Anger Watkins, Lewis Clark, JJ Hibbert and various others
- Maggie Roswell as Luann Van Houten, Helen Lovejoy, Maude Flanders, Miss Hoover, Governor Mary Bailey and various others
- Russi Taylor as Martin Prince^{[A]}

Notes

- A. Only in episode "Thanksgiving of Horror"

Several recurring guests made return appearances, including four stints from Joe Mantegna reprising his role of mobster Fat Tony, four different roles from Dawnn Lewis, Natasha Lyonne voicing Krusty's daughter Sophie again, Glenn Close as Homer's mother Mona Simpson, Kelsey Grammer as Sideshow Bob, Jon Lovitz as Artie Ziff, and Werner Herzog and Michael York as new characters Dr. Lund and Clayton respectively.

The season features guest appearances from John Mulaney, Michael Rapaport, Jason Momoa, Bob Odenkirk, Jane Goodall, Asia Kate Dillon, Fortune Feimster, Scott Bakula, Steve Ballmer, Zach Woods, Beanie Feldstein, Ed "Too Tall" Jones, Jim Parsons, Taran Killam, Dr. Drew Pinsky, Billy Porter, Kevin Smith, Joey King, Lilly Singh and Cate Blanchett. Black Mirror creator Charlie Brooker has a cameo in a referential segment of "Thanksgiving of Horror" while the episode "Bart the Bad Guy" features Marvel Cinematic Universe producers Kevin Feige and the Russo brothers in parody roles, along with Maria Hill actress Cobie Smulders. "The Hateful Eight-Year-Olds" features Riverdale stars Camila Mendes, Madelaine Petsch and Lili Reinhart playing three girls who bully Lisa.

== Production ==
This season and the next season were ordered in February 2019. Seven episodes were holdovers from the previous season. Executive producer Al Jean continued his role as primary showrunner, a role he had since the thirteenth season. Executive producer Matt Selman was also the showrunner for several episodes, a role he performed since the twenty-third season.

=== Development ===
This season featured the first scripts credited to writers Max Cohn and Elisabeth Kiernan Averick. It also featured the final episode written by Bill Odenkirk before leaving for the revival of the television series Spitting Image. Comedian and writer Pete Holmes also both wrote and guest-starred in the two-part "Warrin' Priests" episodes. While in "Warrin' Priests" Holmes plays the character of Bode, he had previously guest-starred in season 30 premiere "Bart's Not Dead" as a different character. The episode "The Incredible Lightness of Being a Baby" was delayed from the previous season, with the original intent to air it instead of "I'm Just a Girl Who Can't Say D'oh" on April 7, 2019. The episode was put on hold after the show's producers decided to make a short film related to the episode involving Maggie and another baby named Hudson titled Playdate with Destiny. The short film premiered on February 29, 2020, attached to advanced screenings of the Disney/Pixar release Onward with "The Incredible Lightness of Being a Baby" serving as a sequel to it.

In April 2020, the show joined the rest of Fox's Animation Domination lineup in a partnership with Caffeine for the AniDom Beyond Show, a recap show hosted by Andy Richter. The hour-long program featured interviews with guests and live interactivity with fans online, with recaps for the episodes that aired through April and May. The Simpsons episode aired on April 26 featuring Al Jean, cast member Yeardley Smith and writer and guest star Pete Holmes. On May 18, Matt Selman joined the show with other writers from the Fox Animation Domination lineup.

=== Casting ===
Recurring co-star Russi Taylor died on July 26, 2019, and had been with the show since the first season voicing characters such as Martin Prince, Sherri and Terri and Üter Zörker. When asked about retirement of the characters as with previous actors who have died, executive producer Al Jean stated that he believed Taylor would want the characters to continue. The last episode to feature Taylor was "Thanksgiving of Horror". Voice actress Grey DeLisle was announced as the replacement voice for Martin Prince, Sherri and Terri starting with the episode "Marge the Lumberjill".

It was during the run of this season that longtime voice actor Hank Azaria announced that he was officially stepping down from voicing Apu Nahasapeemapetilon, a character he had played since the episode "The Telltale Head" from the first season. The character and Azaria's portrayal of him had come under scrutiny since the release of Hari Kondabolu's 2017 documentary The Problem with Apu. Apu's portrayal came under scrutiny again when the Simpsons staff referenced the criticism as being too politically correct in the season 29 episode "No Good Read Goes Unpunished" which resulted in backlash from some people concerned about the issue who felt that the response was immature. Azaria said that it was a mutual decision made between himself and the senior staff, stating, "all we know there is I won't be doing the voice anymore unless there's some way to transition it or something."

=== Animation ===
Parts of this season were produced and aired during the COVID-19 pandemic, which delayed or canceled the production of many television productions, but as an animated production, this took less of a toll on the show than most live-action ones. Executive producer James L. Brooks encouraged the staff to begin working from their homes in early March 2020, before California's stay-at-home order was declared. In an interview with The Hollywood Reporter in late March 2020, Al Jean stated, "Production hasn't skipped a day or lost a beat. We intend to do the 22 shows we were contracted to do... There's been no change in how we do things."

=== Music ===
Also in "The Hateful Eight-Year-Olds", members of the band Weezer voiced the members of cover band Sailor's Delight, performed the main theme song at the end of the episode as themselves and also debuted their song "Blue Dream" within the episode. Musician Jill Sobule wrote and performed an original song for the episode "Marge the Lumberjill" and John Legend also performed an original song for "The Miseducation of Lisa Simpson" while guest-starring with his wife Chrissy Teigen.

== Reception ==
=== Ratings ===
For the 2019-2020 television season, the season earned a 0.94 rating in the 18-49 demographic, which was the 33rd best performing show. It averaged 2.58 million viewers, which was the 111th best performing show.

Viewership and ratings per episode of The Simpsons season 31
No.	Title	Air date	Rating/share (18–49)	Viewers (millions)	DVR (18–49)	DVR viewers (millions)	Total (18–49)	Total viewers (millions)
1	"The Winter of Our Monetized Content"	September 29, 2019	0.9/4	2.33	0.2	0.48	1.1	2.81
2	"Go Big or Go Homer"	October 6, 2019	2.1/9	5.63	0.2	0.40	2.3	6.05
3	"The Fat Blue Line"	October 13, 2019	0.8/4	2.13	0.2	0.43	1.0	2.57
4	"Treehouse of Horror XXX"	October 20, 2019	2.0/9	5.42	0.3	0.65	2.4	6.08
5	"Gorillas on the Mast"	November 3, 2019	0.8/4	2.02	0.2	0.39	1.0	2.41
6	"Marge the Lumberjill"	November 10, 2019	1.8/8	5.00	0.2	0.42	2.0	5.43
7	"Livin La Pura Vida"	November 17, 2019	0.8/4	2.08	0.2	0.39	1.0	2.48
8	"Thanksgiving of Horror"	November 24, 2019	1.8/8	5.42	0.3	0.67	2.1	6.10
9	"Todd, Todd, Why Hast Thou Forsaken Me?"	December 1, 2019	0.7/3	1.99	0.2	0.49	0.9	2.49
10	"Bobby, It's Cold Outside"	December 15, 2019	1.7/8	4.97	0.2	0.55	2.0	5.52
11	"Hail to the Teeth"	January 5, 2020	0.6/3	1.81	0.2	0.41	0.8	2.22
12	"The Miseducation of Lisa Simpson"	February 16, 2020	0.7	1.95	0.2	0.46	0.9	2.42
13	"Frinkcoin"	February 23, 2020	0.7	1.84	0.1	0.37	0.8	2.20
14	"Bart the Bad Guy"	March 1, 2020	0.6	1.66	0.2	0.42	0.8	2.08
15	"Screenless"	March 8, 2020	0.5	1.63	0.1	0.36	0.7	1.99
16	"Better Off Ned"	March 15, 2020	0.6	1.70	0.2	0.41	0.7	2.11
17	"Highway to Well"	March 22, 2020	0.6	1.66	0.2	0.47	0.8	2.13
18	"The Incredible Lightness of Being a Baby"	April 19, 2020	0.5	1.58	0.1	0.35	0.7	1.93
19	"Warrin' Priests"	April 26, 2020	0.5	1.35	0.2	0.37	0.6	1.72
20	"Warrin' Priests Part 2"	May 3, 2020	0.5	1.36	0.1	0.33	0.6	1.69
21	"The Hateful Eight-Year-Olds"	May 10, 2020	0.5	1.40	0.1	0.37	0.6	1.76
22	"The Way of the Dog"	May 17, 2020	0.6	1.89	0.1	0.31	0.8	2.20

=== Critical response ===
Jesse Bereta of Bubbleblabber gave the season an 8 out of 10. He thought the season demonstrated the new freedom of creativity under Disney, with an episode about cannabis, parodies of the Treehouse of Horror series and the Marvel Cinematic Universe, and a continuation from an animated short shown in front of a Disney/Pixar feature. However, he also thought there was a recycled plot with Lisa needing braces again and a two-part episode with an average story.

=== Accolades ===
In early December 2019, it was announced that three episodes had been nominated for Writers Guild of America Award for Television: Animation at the 72nd Writers Guild of America Awards, resulting in The Simpsons having the most nominations overall that year. The writers and episodes nominated were John Frink for "Go Big or Go, Homer," Brian Kelley for "Livin' La Pura Vida" and Dan Vebber for "Thanksgiving of Horror" and on February 1, 2020, it was announced that Vebber and "Thanksgiving of Horror" had won. Vebber was also nominated for his script to "Bart the Bad Guy" at the 73rd Writers Guild of America Awards.

The show also received a nomination for the Critics' Choice Television Award for Best Animated Series at the 25th Critics' Choice Awards, but lost to BoJack Horseman when winners were announced on January 12, 2020.

On July 28, 2020, it was announced the show had received three nominations at the 72nd Primetime Creative Arts Emmy Awards. "Thanksgiving of Horror" was nominated for Primetime Emmy Award for Outstanding Animated Program, while both Nancy Cartwright and Hank Azaria were up for the Primetime Emmy Award for Outstanding Character Voice-Over Performance. Cartwright was nominated for playing Bart Simpson, Nelson Muntz, Ralph Wiggum and Todd Flanders for the episode "Better Off Ned" and Azaria for his roles of Professor Frink, Moe Szyslak, Chief Wiggum, Carl Carlson, Cletus Spuckler, Kirk Van Houten and Captain McCallister in "Frinkcoin". On September 19, 2020, it was announced however that Rick and Morty won the award for Outstanding Animated Program, while Maya Rudolph picked up the voice-acting award for her work in Big Mouth.
