= Marge the Lumberjill =

- The Simpsons episode
- Episode no.: Season 31; Episode 6
- Directed by: Rob Oliver
- Written by: Ryan Koh
- Production code: ZABF02
- Original air date: November 10, 2019

Guest appearances
- Asia Kate Dillon as Paula; Natasha Lyonne as Sophie; Jill Sobule performing "Lumberjill"

Episode features
- Chalkboard gag: "Daylight savings isn't something I can spend"
- Couch gag: The Simpson family's couch turns to a spoof of the Pirates of the Caribbean ride.

Episode chronology
← Previous "Gorillas on the Mast"	Next → "Livin La Pura Vida"
- The Simpsons season 31

"Marge the Lumberjill" is the sixth episode of the thirty-first season of the American animated television series The Simpsons, and the 668th episode overall. It aired in the United States on Fox on November 10, 2019. The episode was directed by Rob Oliver and written by Ryan Koh.

In this episode, Marge becomes a lumberjill competitor with Patty's lesbian friend, which worries Homer. Asia Kate Dillon and Natasha Lyonne guest starred. Musician Jill Sobule also wrote and performed an original song for the episode. The episode received negative reviews.

This episode introduced Grey Griffin as Sherri and Terri and Martin Prince following the death of Russi Taylor on July 26, 2019.

== Plot ==
At Springfield Elementary, the children perform dramatic scenes they have written based on TV shows and YouTube videos. Lisa performs a scene based on her own family, starring herself. Database plays Bart, Ralph plays Homer, Sam plays Marge, and Kearney plays Maggie. The Simpsons feel uncomfortable as to how others see them. Marge in particular feels self-conscious for being perceived as boring. To change these perceptions, Marge tries to do a funny sermon at the First Church of Springfield, but fails.

Going back home, lightning strikes and fells a tree onto the family car. The next day, Homer starts chopping down the trunk but soon goes to sleep on his hammock, so Marge starts chopping it herself. An impressed Patty invites her "lumberjill" friend Paula to watch her doing the job; Paula proceeds to coach Marge and invites her to become a lumberjill in the woods.

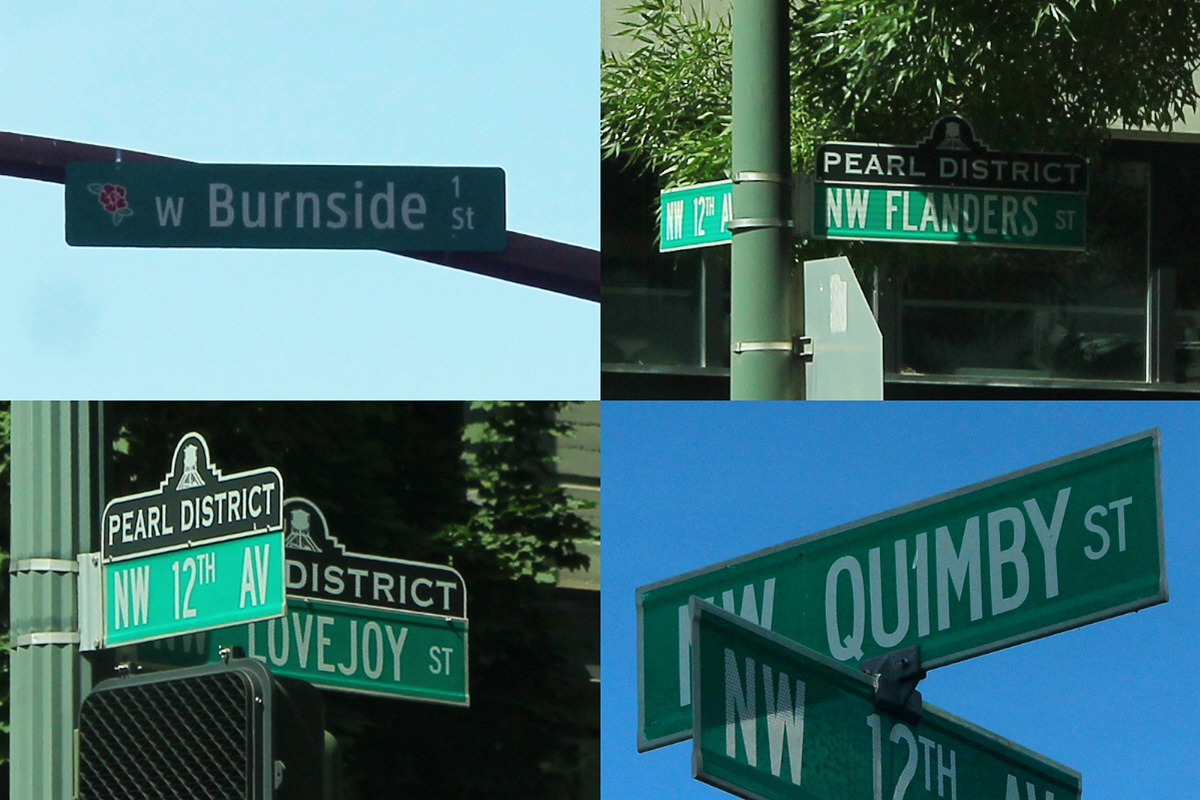
A montage shows some of the signs for Portland streets that inspired the names of the series characters.

Marge eventually takes up timbersports, and joins a team with Paula in the Springfield Timbersports Pro-am, which they win against other men. At this moment, Patty tells Homer that Paula is a lesbian; making Homer fear that Paula will try to steal Marge away from him. Paula eventually asks Marge to become her partner, and train for a month with her in Portland, Oregon and she accepts, amplifying Homer's concerns.

One month later, Homer and the kids go to Portland to watch Marge and Paula in the Grizzly Timbersports Northwest Championship, and to bring Marge back home. When they arrive, they find her getting acquainted in the house with Paula and feeling unsure of going back to Springfield. The next day, Marge and Paula win the championship. Paula tells Homer that she is not romantically interested in Marge; she has a wife who is a ribbon dancer in the Olympics, and they have a child of their own. She also assures Homer that she and Marge are just good friends and that Marge is welcome to come back to train with her anytime. Grateful, Homer offers his sperm to her if she decides to have another kid, to which she says he's in the top three.

In the final scene back in Springfield, Homer buys Maggie a toy chainsaw so she could develop an interest in lumberjacking in the future. However, she gets scared by it as soon as she tries it.

== Production ==
This episode marked the first time Sherri and Terri and Martin Prince was voiced by Grey Griffin following the death of Russi Taylor on July 26, 2019. Taylor would be featured one more time as the voice of Martin in "Thanksgiving of Horror".

== Reception ==
=== Viewing figures ===
Leading out of an NFL doubleheader, the episode earned a 1.8 rating with a 8 share and was watched by 5.00 million viewers. which was the most watched show on Fox that night.

=== Critical response ===
Tony Sokol of Den of Geek gave the episode 2 and a half out of 5 stars. He felt the episode was mediocre, and it was not taking any chances because Homer and Marge's marriage was never in any real danger.

Dennis Perkins of The A.V. Club gave the episode a B−, stating "It all leaves the amiable 'Marge The Lumberjill' feeling awfully inessential, especially since it isn't packed with compensatory great jokes...And there's a lovely little present for quick-eared fans of quirky bisexual singer-songwriter Jill Sobule (of the superior 'I Kissed A Girl' song), who sings the original Marge training montage anthem 'The Lumberjill Song' after she is name-checked as the newly Portland-ized Marge's fashion icon. It's sweet, even if its playful depiction of Marge's inner awakening feels more invested than the episode as a whole ends up being."
