= Kyle Gordon =

American comedy musician (born 1992)

- Gordon in 2024
- Born: October 9, 1992 (age 34); Katonah, New York, U.S.
- Education: Denison University
- Occupations: YouTuber; singer; comedian; artist
- Spouse: Canning Robb (m. 2026)

YouTube information
- Channel: kylegordonisgreat
- Years active: 2018–present
- Genres: Parodies; satire; songs
- Subscribers: 1.39 million
- Views: 1.26 billion
- Musical career
- Genres: Musical comedy; parody music
- Instruments: Vocals; guitar
- Years active: 2023–present
- Label: BMG
- Last updated: June 21, 2026

Kyle Harris Gordon (born October 9, 1992) is an American comedian, actor, musician, singer-songwriter and YouTuber. Gordon gained popularity through his music in which he portrays satirical characters and parodies popular music from various eras.

== Early life and education ==
Gordon grew up in Katonah, New York, in a Conservative Ashkenazi Jewish family. He attended John Jay High School and graduated from Denison University in 2014 where he sang in the a cappella group the Denison Hilltoppers. He enrolled at the Magnet Theater and joined Brooklyn Comedy Collective’s improv house teams in 2015.

== Career ==
His YouTube channel has over one million subscribers and over 750 million views. He also has 3.7 million followers and 178 million likes on TikTok, both as of March 2025.

In summer of 2023, Kyle Gordon premiered his first song, "Planet of the Bass", which was released on August 15, 2023 and is a parody of 1990s European dance music. Brooks Allison, a sketch writer for The Tonight Show Starring Jimmy Fallon, and Jamie Siegel served as producers.

On August 16, 2023, he performed the song along with Audrey Trullinger, who portrayed the female vocalist Ms. Biljana Electronica in the music video, at the Jonas Brothers concert in TD Garden in Boston. Trullinger would later reappear playing the character of guest rapper Trixie B in the music video for Kyle Gordon's "Selekta", a satire of early-2000s British 2 Step music; she would also go on to provide the singing voice for the character of Mae Haven Thompsons, a fictional tween pop star, on Kyle Gordon's track "Freak Out"; She would also play the character in the music video for the song.

In March 2024, Gordon released his debut album, Kyle Gordon is Great, which contained the single "Planet of the Bass", but also featured parodies of 2000s country music, pop punk emo, and bossa nova.

In May 2024, Gordon guest starred as the voice of DJ Crazy Times in The Simpsons season 35 episode "The Tipping Point", where he performed a parody of "Planet of the Bass".

In April 2025, Gordon released his second album, Kyle Gordon is Wonderful, which featured the single "We Will Never Die", parodying folk-pop songs of the early 2010s. The album also features parodies of British rap, nu metal, and Italo disco.

Gordon's third album, Kyle Gordon is Everywhere, was released on October 2, 2026, and features narration by Daniel Radcliffe. Its lead single, "Mr. Jambo", was released on July 17, 2026. It is a satire of Graceland, an album by American singer Paul Simon, and other songs by white musicians who tried incorporating elements of African music in their work throughout the 1980s. Two further singles were released from the album: The electroclash parody "I'm a Whore" (as well as its meta-parody "I'm a Horse" released as a non-album single), and the 1990s pop rock parody "If You Break Up with Me". The album also introduces the song "Blasphemy", a Ballad-style Gothic Rock homage with lyrics centered around the moral guilt of a necrophiliac who is killed by the corpse he defiles; "Hero of Fallujah", which satirizes patriotic post-9/11 radio-rock music a la 3 Doors Down's "Citizen Soldier"'; and "We are the Zorg", a Cyberpunk-themed EBM music track in the vein of acts such as Front Line Assembly and Gothminister. In November 2026, he was considered one of Variety's ten comics to look out for in 2026.

== Personal life ==
Gordon has resided in New York City since 2014 and has been in a relationship with actress-comedian Canning Robb since 2020. They became engaged in 2025 and married in 2026.

Gordon is a long time fan of the New York Mets and the New York Jets.

== Discography ==
=== Studio albums ===
Title	Details	Peak chart positions
Title	Details	US Com.
Kyle Gordon is Great	Released: March 1, 2024; Label: BMG; Formats: Digital download, streaming	8
Kyle Gordon is Wonderful	Released: April 4, 2025; Label: BMG; Formats: Digital download, streaming	10
Kyle Gordon is Everywhere	Released: October 2, 2026; Label: BMG; Formats: Digital download, streaming	8

=== Singles ===
==== As lead artist ====
Title	Year	Peak chart positions	Album
Title	Year	US Dance	Album
"Planet of the Bass" (featuring DJ Crazy Times and Ms. Biljana Electronica)	2023	46	Kyle Gordon Is Great
"Ugliest Girl on the Beach" (featuring Antonio Frankfurt)	2023	—	Kyle Gordon Is Great
"Girls are the Best" (featuring Tanya McCabe)	2023	—	Kyle Gordon Is Great
"My Life (Is the Worst Life Ever)" (featuring Our Wounded Courtship)	2024	—	Kyle Gordon Is Great
"The Irish Drinking Song" (featuring The Gammy Fluthers)	2024	—	Kyle Gordon Is Great
"My Husband's Ghost (This Christmas)" (featuring Arabella DeFury)	2024	—	Kyle Gordon Is Wonderful
"We Will Never Die" (featuring Kody Redwing and The Broken Hearts)	2025	—	Kyle Gordon Is Wonderful
"Selekta" (featuring Albie Wobble, Trixie B, and Sidequest)	2025	—	Kyle Gordon Is Wonderful
"Crawl to Me" (featuring Stool Sample)	2025	—	Kyle Gordon Is Wonderful
"Mr. Jambo" (featuring Barry Bergen)	2026	—	Kyle Gordon Is Everywhere
"I'm a Whore" (featuring .exegesis)	2026	—	Kyle Gordon Is Everywhere
"I'm a Horse" (featuring .exegesis)	2026	—	Non-album single
"If You Break Up with Me" (featuring 10 Year Plan)	2026	—	Kyle Gordon is Everywhere
"Freak Out" (featuring Mae Haven Thompsons)	2026	—	Kyle Gordon is Everywhere

==== As featured artist ====
Title	Year	Album
"Myrtle Beach" (OCT featuring Kyle Gordon)	2025	On Company Time

=== Music videos ===
Title	Year	Director(s)
"Planet of the Bass"	2023	Ori Segev, Noah Dixon
"Ugliest Girl on the Beach"	2023	Oliver Hamilton
"Girls are the Best"	2023	Preston Leatherman
"My Life (Is the Worst Life Ever)"	2024	Ori Segev, Noah Dixon
"My Husband's Ghost (This Christmas)"	2024	Ori Segev, Noah Dixon
"We Will Never Die"	2025	David Foley
"Selekta"	2025	David Foley
"Selekta (Sidequest Remix)"	2025	David Foley
"Crawl to Me"	2025	Eliot Charof
"Girl of the Heart"	2025	Oliver Hamilton
"Mr. Jambo"	2026	Ori Segev
"I'm a Whore" / "I'm a Horse"	2026	Bucky Illingworth
"If You Break Up with Me"	2026	Kyle Bower
"Freak Out"	2026	Emma Raimi
