= Highway to Well =

- The Simpsons episode
- Episode no.: Season 31; Episode 17
- Directed by: Chris Clements
- Written by: Carolyn Omine
- Production code: ZABF10
- Original air date: March 22, 2020

Guest appearances
- Chelsea Peretti as Lauren; Billy Porter as Desmond; Kevin Smith as himself

Episode chronology
← Previous "Better Off Ned"	Next → "The Incredible Lightness of Being a Baby"
- The Simpsons season 31

"Highway to Well" is the 17th episode of the thirty-first season of the American animated television series The Simpsons, and the 679th episode overall. It aired in the United States on Fox on March 22, 2020. The episode was written by Carolyn Omine and was directed by Chris Clements.

In this episode, Marge is hired as a saleswoman at a cannabis store while Homer runs a competing store behind Moe's Tavern. Chelsea Peretti and Billy Porter guest starred. Filmmaker Kevin Smith appeared as himself. The episode received mixed reviews.

== Plot ==
Marge takes Maggie to her first day of preschool. When she learns she cannot stay with her, she checks her favorite mommy blog, "Yaaass, Mom!", for tips on how to pass the time. She first tries going to the gym to take a Soul Cycle class, where she is uncomfortable with the aggressive coach who wins the other ladies over with his angry coaching. She then attends a ceramics class at the community center only to find it taught by a similar teacher whom the ladies cheer over. Later, she goes to the Nuclear Plant to "sex-prise" Homer, but finds they are unable to have any privacy since the surveillance team loudly insists on spying on them having sex.

Running out of activities to do, Marge finds herself at Well + Good, where they are hiring new people. She makes a good impression at the center and is immediately hired. The day of the opening, she is nervous but makes a $100 sale, before finding out they are a legal cannabis shop, making her a drug dealer. The owner, Drederick Tatum, tries to convince her to stay, but she is reluctant until Homer, Bart and Lisa convince her to keep the job, where she helps various members of the community.

When Otto tries to buy some cannabis, he is confused by the variety of products and goes to Moe's. There he expresses his feelings toward the situation, and wanting to bring back the illegal drug trade, Homer, Moe and Lenny recreate it in the tavern's back room. Meanwhile, Tatum unveils "The Drederick", a cannabis resort and spa, and wants Marge to host the opening. However, he claims he cannot offer her the job because Homer is giving weed a bad image with his shop. Marge tries to convince Homer to stop, but he refuses and the two argue fiercely all night. Tatum offers Marge an alternative option: if Marge could provide evidence that Homer is serving food, the county health department will shut him down. Marge goes through with the plan, giving Homer a jar of cheese balls and encouraging him to serve some to Lenny and Krusty the Clown. When they eat some of the cheese balls, the department closes the activity, betraying Homer.

At The Drederick's opening ceremony, Homer sneaks in claiming to be Kevin Smith's father, and, supposedly drunk, upsets the influencers by revealing Marge has never tried pot herself. To save face, she tries some and feels the effects of getting high. She finds out she was deceived and that the people at Well + Good were only promoting their cannabis products as healthy as a front to get high. She attempts to counter the high by eating food, only to find out they are all laced with pot and that the napkins are potent in pot. Increasingly disoriented, she makes her way into the bathroom and is comforted by Homer, who had faked being drunk to teach her a lesson.

After Marge's bad experience with cannabis, she apologizes to Homer for ratting him out; he also apologizes for ruining the one place that made her feel special. As Marge is still feeling weird from her high, Homer tries to make it up to her by lighting a joint, which turns out to be an electronic cigarette that explodes and causes a chain reaction that destroys the resort completely.

In the end, Well + Good closes down and the city declares cannabis outlawed in an emergency law. However, Lisa points out that with the loss of the tax money, Maggie's preschool will soon be shut down.

== Production ==
In January 2020, Kevin Smith announced that he would be guest starring as himself in an episode of The Simpsons. Billy Porter played Desmond, the Well + Good store manager, and Chelsea Peretti played Lauren, a saleswoman at the store. Peretti guest starred as a different character last season.

== Reception ==
=== Viewing figures ===
The episode earned a 0.6 rating and was watched by 1.66 million viewers, which was the most watched show on Fox that night.

=== Critical response ===
Dennis Perkins of The A.V. Club gave this episode a B, stating that "Now that the legal pot business is here to stay...that the Simpsons (family and series) would incorporate it into the sweep of shenanigans, adventures, and whatnot feels, well, organic. And the script for ‘Highway To Well,’ credited to the always-welcome Carolyn Omine, does an admirable job of making the marijuana element (underrated dispensary name) feel right at home as just another excuse for Homer and Marge's differences to bubble to the surface, rather than reeking with ‘very special episode’ staleness or sensationalism. As things turn out, legalized pot is just another new development in American society that reveals the characters, in a more or less satisfying manner."

Tony Sokol of Den of Geek gave this episode 3.5 out of 5 stars. He felt the jokes would not work in the future when marijuana would not be taboo for the next generation.
