= Thanksgiving of Horror =

- The Simpsons episode
- Promotional poster
- Episode no.: Season 31; Episode 8
- Directed by: Rob Oliver
- Written by: Dan Vebber
- Production code: YABF17
- Original air date: November 24, 2019

Guest appearance
- Charlie Brooker as Social Media App voice

Episode chronology
← Previous "Livin La Pura Vida"	Next → "Todd, Todd, Why Hast Thou Forsaken Me?"
- The Simpsons season 31

"Thanksgiving of Horror" is the eighth episode of the thirty-first season of the American animated television series The Simpsons, and the 670th episode overall. It aired in the United States on Fox on November 24, 2019. The episode was written by Dan Vebber, and was directed by Rob Oliver.

In this episode, the Simpsons, as turkeys, avoid being eaten by Pilgrims, Homer buys an artificial intelligence to help Marge with Thanksgiving, and a cranberry sauce creature comes to life on a spaceship. Charlie Brooker guest starred as a social media app voice. The episode received positive reviews.

On February 1, 2020, Dan Vebber won the Writers Guild of America Award for Outstanding Writing in Animation at the 72nd Writers Guild of America Awards for his script to this episode and the episode was nominated for an Emmy in 2020 for Outstanding Animated Program.

This is the final episode featuring Russi Taylor, who had been with the show since the first season voicing characters such as Martin Prince, Sherri and Terri, and Uter, due to her death on July 26, 2019. Two prior episodes that aired were recorded after her death, with successor Grey Griffin already voicing Taylor's characters.

== Plot ==
In the introduction, Marge informs the viewers that, because of the 'looming spectre of everything', there are two Treehouse of Horror episodes this year. Homer complains about not knowing when to eat dinner on Thanksgiving, while Kang and Kodos appear dressed as seventeenth-century colonists and declare their intentions to take over the world.

=== A-Gobble-Ypto ===
The Simpson family and some other Springfield residents are depicted as turkeys, while others are depicted as Pilgrims. After Marge lays an egg, the latter hunt for their Thanksgiving dinner and Homer is among the turkeys captured; Bart escapes, but follows them back to their settlement. Several turkeys are bloodily killed, but a panic erupts when the turkey version of Grampa continues to run around with his head cut off.

In the confusion, Bart rescues Homer and they reunite with their family, but are chased by Constable Wiggum until a bear mauls him to death. The egg then hatches to reveal a turkey version of Maggie. Upon watching some Pilgrims eat turkey dinner, Homer comments that times will be dark for them as Thanksgiving becomes a new human tradition.

=== The Fourth Thursday After Tomorrow ===
To help Marge with the Thanksgiving cooking as the Simpsons are holding a dinner party for many of their friends, Homer orders an A.I. with all of her memories, who acts as the protagonist of this story. Marge becomes jealous as the A.I. proves better at running the family than her. She decides to delete her after the holiday. A.I. Marge finds out and, after cooking a huge and delicious meal that Marge takes credit for, tries to escape into the internet.

She is nearly stymied by Marge, but convinces Maggie to help, showing that she is better at mothering than Marge herself. She also reveals to the guests that she cooked the meal before escaping, causing Marge's social rating to plummet (a parody of another Black Mirror episode, "Nosedive"). Things are made worse when Homer tries to comfort her and inadvertently reveals himself as a robot, much to Marge's shock. Now free, the A.I. happily decides to spend some time in various places on the internet, starting with Etsy.

=== The Last Thanksgiving/The First Blarg-sgiving ===
While on a spaceship years after the Earth's destruction, the kids are awoken from hibernation to do some work before landing on their new planet. Bart and Milhouse try to create a Thanksgiving dinner, but they can only find one can of cranberry sauce, which Bart tries to replicate and accidentally brings to life. The creature, being made of gelatin, eats bones, and soon kills every child except Bart, Lisa, Milhouse and Martin, the latter of whom betrays the others before allowing himself to be killed.

Milhouse decides to befriend the monster, but is thrown aside by it instead, prompting Bart and Lisa to trick it into releasing Milhouse and launching itself into a large can. The two release the can into space, but it resists and damages the ship, causing it to crash on a nearby planet. Bart and Lisa reunite with Homer, Marge, Maggie and Santa's Little Helper, but not Snowball II, who died after her cryopod malfunctioned long ago, only for the creature to arrive on their new planet. Thankfully, the humans are aided by some native aliens, who make the monster into food, ending with an extraterrestrial version of the first Thanksgiving. Lisa then narrates that the monster happily found its true purpose: being fed to others, as the title card is renamed to "The First Blarg-sgiving".

=== Credits ===
During the credits, footage of the Bart Simpson balloon at the Macy's Thanksgiving Day Parade is shown.

== Production ==
The run time of this episode is 24 minutes and 52 seconds, making it the longest single episode of The Simpsons ever aired, replacing Who Shot Mr. Burns? Part Two, after holding the record for 24 years. While The Great Phatsby was advertised and aired as a double-length episode three seasons earlier, it was actually produced as two separate episodes and then merged into one. The Fox press release for the episode stated that filmmaker Werner Herzog was going to again guest star in the episode as the character Walter Hotenhoffer, but he was not featured in the final broadcast.

The idea of doing a Thanksgiving version of a Treehouse of Horror episode was that of executive producer Matt Selman starting with the concept of doing Apocalypto with turkeys. The voice cast came up with the turkey's gobble language and the producers thought it would be funnier to just have them gobble without subtitles, believing the audience knew the characters well enough to more or less understand what they were saying. "We wanted it to feel like if you’re a turkey, Thanksgiving is pretty much a horror movie where you’re being hunted down and slaughtered," writer Dan Vebber stated.

The idea for the second segment was to make the audience root for the fake A.I. Marge over the real one and to try and cram in as many Black Mirror references and Easter eggs as possible. Black Mirror creator Charlie Brooker was asked to voice a social media app in the episode. Vebber said of the cameo, "I came up with the idea of having him voice a computer at the end to say ‘Firewall activated’ but Matt Selman lobbied for ‘social rating: falling.’ We disagreed on this until the day we recorded the voices, which was when I came up with the ‘nosediving’ reference from the show. It was the perfect compromise between what we both wanted."

Vebber directed voice actress Russi Taylor for what would be her final performance as Martin Prince in "The Last Thanksgiving/The First Blarg-sgiving" segment. Taylor recorded her lines months before her death, and had been ill from cancer treatments during the previous recordings, but Vebber said during this final recording "She was so into it she was really just laughing her head off. She thought it was so funny that, at the end, Martin's entire skeleton just gets sucked out of him, and she really got into it, asking what the noises would be as he’s getting his skeleton sucked out. She was having the best time." As a nod to Matt Selman, the buttons on the replicator machine in this segment that say “Zip Zap Zorp” are a reference to a common phrase said by the Simpsons Executive Producer instead of “etcetera.”

Selman wanted to show cranberries to tie the acts together. In the first story, a pilgrim woman is preparing cranberries. In the second story, the A.I. Marge is making cranberry sauce from cans showing the pilgrim from the first story. In the final story, the cranberry sauce monster comes from the same brand as the sauce in the second story.

== Cultural references ==
- The first segment is an extended parody of Apocalypto.
- The second segment is a parody of the Black Mirror special, "White Christmas", with smaller references to several other episodes in the series.
- When Homer’s face falls off to reveal a metal exoskeleton at the end of the second segment, this is inspired by the way the android faces pop off in Westworld (film).
- The third segment is primarily a parody of Alien (film), including the opening scene of the ship "waking up," the monster hunting the crew through the vents, Martin's betrayal of the crew, and the monster being blown out of the airlock.
- The cranberry sauce monster is primarily inspired by the Gelatinous cube, a monster from Dungeons & Dragons, although it is also a general homage to movie monsters from The Blob, the Star Trek episode, "The Man Trap," and Life.
- The third segment includes numerous references to Star Trek: The Next Generation, including starting the story with the captain’s log, the replicator machine, and the sound of the hatch opening when they throw the bags of seeds overboard.
- The kids chanting and banging their cutlery around the table is a reference to a famous scene from Freaks (1932 film) where the titular circus freaks chant, “Gooba gabba, one of us.”
- When the family crash lands on the alien planet, the natives they encounter are inspired by the Na’vi from Avatar (2009 film).
- The closing credits for this episode are a parody of the viral YouTube video “Disturbing Strokes,” which sets the opening credits of Diff'rent Strokes to the score from The Dorm That Dripped Blood.

== Reception ==
=== Viewing figures ===
Leading out of an NFL doubleheader, the episode earned a 1.8 rating with a 8 share and was watched by 5.42 million viewers, which was the most watched show on Fox that night.

=== Critical response ===
Dennis Perkins of The A.V. Club gave this episode a B, stating, "'Thanksgiving of Horror' represents the show's writers tossing out a 'Why not?' non-canonical scary story do-over. And, oddly enough, I'm fine with it, especially since this second, Thanksgiving-themed horror outing is scarier, meaner, grosser, and all-around better than this year's original."

Tony Sokol of Den of Geek gave the episode 4 out of 5 stars. He thought the episode was filled with jokes but was not as good as the normal Treehouse of Horror episodes. He also stated that the ability to kill characters led to more creative freedom and stronger commentary.

=== Awards and nominations ===
This episode won the Writers Guild of America Award for Television: Animation at the 72nd Writers Guild of America Awards. It was also nominated for a Primetime Emmy Award for Outstanding Animated Program at the 72nd Primetime Creative Arts Emmy Awards, but lost to the Rick and Morty episode, "The Vat of Acid Episode".
