= Warrin' Priests =

- The Simpsons episodes
- Poster for the episodes
- Episode nos.: Season 31; Episodes 19 and 20
- Directed by: Bob Anderson (Part One); Matthew Nastuk (Part Two)
- Written by: Pete Holmes
- Production codes: ZABF12 (Part One); ZABF13 (Part Two)
- Original air date: April 26, 2020 – May 3, 2020

Guest appearances
- Pete Holmes as Bode Wright; Joe Mantegna as Fat Tony; David Silverman as himself

Episode features
- Chalkboard gag: Part One: "How did the boy get me to do this?" (written by Homer); Part Two: "I will stop reminding the principal I have a later bedtime than he does" (written by Bart)
- Couch gag: Part One: The family's clothes sit on the couch, while the actual family is in the backstage shivering in their underwear.; Part Two: A parody of the HBO series Succession, with Homer telling his family they will not inherit anything because he does not have anything.

Episode chronology
← Previous "The Incredible Lightness of Being a Baby"	Next → "The Hateful Eight-Year-Olds"
- The Simpsons season 31

"Warrin' Priests" is a two-part episode of the American animated television series The Simpsons. The two episodes comprise the 19th and 20th episodes of the thirty-first season and the 681st and 682nd episodes overall. They originally premiered on the Fox network in the United States over two weekends: Part One premiered on April 26, 2020, with Part Two premiering the following week on May 3, 2020. Both parts were written by Pete Holmes; part one was directed by Bob Anderson and part two by Matthew Nastuk. Holmes guest stars as preacher Bode Wright in both parts.

In this episode, a new youth pastor becomes popular and replaces Reverend Lovejoy. As Ned fights the pastor's modern methods, the Lovejoys go to Michigan to learn why he left and came to Springfield. This marks the series' third two-parter following Season 6 and 7's "Who Shot Mr. Burns?" and Season 28's "The Great Phatsby." It is also the final episode in which Carl Carlson is voiced by Hank Azaria as he stepped down following the Season 32 premiere. The title "Warrin' Priests" is a reference to War and Peace by Leo Tolstoy. The episode received positive reviews.

== Plot ==
=== Part One ===
The First Church of Springfield is mostly empty as the service starts, with even the choir being late. Reverend Lovejoy unsuccessfully tries to get the congregation involved. Meanwhile, a young man named Bode Wright turns up in Springfield to apply for the job of youth minister after he saw an advert placed by Helen Lovejoy. Bode gets the job after a short interview, with Helen offering to let him stay with them, to Lovejoy's annoyance.

The next church service, Lovejoy loses his voice completely. Bode then takes over as the pastor for the service and proves a hit with everyone, singing "Amazing Grace" and getting the congregation involved, though Ned Flanders dislikes his modern methods. As the services go on, more and more people turn up to the church, bringing the town into a full-blown religious revival. Lisa and Bode bond together over vegetarianism, science, Buddhism and jazz, and Bode even heals Homer and Marge's marriage problems.

The church council votes to replace Lovejoy with Bode. Lovejoy and Helen travel to Traverse City, Michigan to dig up some dirt on Bode, and while there manage to find a newspaper article that could be Bode's downfall.

=== Part Two ===
As Bode continues to bring record crowds to the church with his fresh ideas and good looks, Ned is disappointed and misses the old ways. Lisa finds that the new minister's teachings help reconcile her with the church, though Marge warns her that Springfield has been traditionally hostile to new ideas. Ned challenges Bode to a scriptural debate and loses. Meanwhile, in Michigan, Lovejoy and Helen visit the Blessed Buy Megachurch, where Bode was fired. Lovejoy asks about Bode and the preacher presents them a USB drive with proof about Bode.

During the ceremony at the church, Lovejoy returns announcing what he found in Michigan: the reason Bode was fired was that as a 19-year-old minister, he burned a Bible during a church service. The next Tuesday, Lisa presents the debate between the two ministers, but the Springfielders do not forgive Bode and he resigns.

At church, before Bode leaves Springfield, Lisa asks him why he burned the Bible. He says that God is in the heart, not in a cathedral or a book, a subtext Lisa points out that the townspeople do not understand.

== Production ==
This is the first episode of the series written by comedian Pete Holmes. Holmes also guest starred as Bode, a young pastor who comes to Springfield. He previously played a different character in the thirtieth season episode "Bart's Not Dead."

== Reception ==
=== Viewing figures ===
The first part earned a 0.5 rating and was watched by 1.35 million viewers, which was the second-most watched show on Fox that night. The second part earned a 0.5 rating and watched by 1.36 million viewers, which was the second-most watched show on Fox that night.

=== Critical response ===
Dennis Perkins from The A.V. Club gave Part One of the episode a B+, stating "Holmes himself plays Bode, the guitar-strumming young pastor who's come to Springfield at the behest of not Reverend Lovejoy (of the interminably sleepy sermons and defensive moralizing), but wife Helen. (She put an ad for help on "Christ's List.")."

Tony Sokol of Den of Geek stated that Part One was more character focused and liked the steadier escalation. He also highlighted the change in format with the two-part episode. Sokol gave Part Two a 4 out of 5, stating "'Warrin' Priests' is a parable. Springfield is America. The majority of people are as desperate for change as they are desperately afraid of it. The episode is a testament to longer-form Simpsons. The series gets more adventurous, allows more attention to details, develops supporting personalities and lets the tensions grow. It almost felt like this episode could've used another full segment."
