= Hail to the Teeth =

- The Simpsons episode
- Episode no.: Season 31; Episode 11
- Directed by: Mark Kirkland
- Written by: Elisabeth Kiernan Averick
- Production code: ZABF05
- Original air date: January 5, 2020

Guest appearances
- Jon Lovitz as Artie Ziff and Rabbi

Episode features
- Chalkboard gag: "Teacher spent new year's eve at home by choice"
- Couch gag: The family sits on a couch, the image of it is seen on a bronze coin that Nelson Muntz places on a railroad, and gets flattened. Nelson shows it shining and he exclaims "Ha Ha!", just before getting hit by another train.

Episode chronology
← Previous "Bobby, It's Cold Outside"	Next → "The Miseducation of Lisa Simpson"
- The Simpsons season 31

"Hail to the Teeth" is the 11th episode of the thirty-first season of the American animated television series The Simpsons, and the 673rd episode overall. Being the first episode to air in the 2020s, it aired in the United States on Fox on January 5, 2020. The episode was written by Elisabeth Kiernan Averick and was directed by Mark Kirkland.

In this episode, Artie Ziff marries a robot that looks like Marge while Lisa uses her new braces to run for class president. Jon Lovitz guest starred as Artie Ziff. The episode received positive reviews.

== Plot ==
Artie Ziff invites Homer and Marge to his wedding. Although both are conflicted about going, due to the number of times Artie has tried to break them up, they reluctantly accept the invitation. Homer goes alone to the bachelor party, where he finds Artie has regained his wealth after his parole, selling burning cash-resembling fireplaces. Attending the ceremony with Marge, Homer gives the bride away, only to find out that the bride looks just like Marge. Unsettled, Marge leaves the ceremony, and later decides to tell the bride that Artie only married her because she and Marge look alike. She and Homer get to the honeymoon suite and find out that the marriage was a ruse and Artie's bride is a robot. Artie admits he had been trying to make a robot clone of Marge for years, but they all have flaws. Following Marge's suggestion, he uses his army of Marge droids to do humanitarian work, though they all reject his sexual advances, with half inexplicably sprouting wings to fly off.

Meanwhile, Lisa is heckled by a man who claims that she will be prettier and more popular if she smiled more often. Marge takes her to a new dentist to get a new set of braces, as her old dentist was a rogue periodontist masquerading as an orthodontist. The top half of her braces cause her to constantly smile and finally win popularity among her classmates. Initially disgusted by the shallowness of the concept, Lisa decides to bank on her newfound popularity and run for class president. However, the bottom half of her braces are installed, resulting in her now constantly frowning for the next six months. Bart enlists Martin Prince to manipulate a live feed of Lisa doing her election speech to make her smile, but the app malfunctions and Lisa exposes herself, causing her to lose the election to Dubya Spuckler. Outside in the school playground, Marge attempts to comfort Lisa, only to witness the same man heckle her for not smiling. Marge then inexplicably sprouts robotic wings and carries the man into the air while Lisa smiles and cheers her on.

== Production ==
This is the first episode of the series written by Elisabeth Kiernan Averick. Jon Lovitz reprised his role as Artie Ziff.

== Reception ==
=== Viewing figures ===
The episode earned a 0.6 rating with a 3 share and was watched by 1.81 million viewers, which was the second-most watched show on Fox that night.

=== Critical response ===
Dennis Perkins of The A.V. Club gave this episode a B+, stating, "The first credited script by former Crazy Ex-Girlfriend writer (and new Simpsons producer) Elisabeth Kiernan Averick, the episode is precisely the sort of latter-day Simpsons I’m excited my niece will slot into her growing databank of Simpsons fandom. Readers who—niece-like—have endured this critic’s grumpy dissertations concerning The Simpsons and how, with the right writers, ‘the good years’ could be now, dammit, should recognize that this is the sort of new blood I’ve been talking about. Averick clearly loves The Simpsons, and understands them. There are fine jokes that have nothing to do with the episode's ‘message’ alongside ones that grow out of Lisa and Marge's specific arcs."

Tony Sokol of Den of Geek gave this episode 3.5 out of 5 stars, stating, "Arty has always been in love with Marge. He’s been plotting to get rid of Homer one way or another since the High School prom, once almost getting Homer sentenced to jail to get him out of the way. The wedding, of course, is a ploy to make Marge jealous, which works about as well as the replicant Marges Arty has developed in search of the perfect wife. Robotics is a consistent gag for The Simpsons, especially discarded prototypes, like the ones Mr. Burns made of himself a few episodes ago. His love solution has a touch of The Bride of Frankenstein in it. There is a very familiar spindly legged spider-Marge on the trash heap, but the best model is a Marge who has a toaster built in her head which doesn’t have slots large enough to toast bagels."
