= The Way of the Dog =

- The Simpsons episode
- Episode no.: Season 31; Episode 22
- Directed by: Matthew Faughnan
- Written by: Carolyn Omine
- Production code: ZABF16
- Original air date: May 17, 2020
- Running time: 21 minutes

Guest appearances
- Cate Blanchett as Elaine Wolff; Michael York as Clayton

Episode chronology
← Previous "The Hateful Eight-Year-Olds"	Next → "Undercover Burns"
- The Simpsons season 31

"The Way of the Dog" is the 22nd and final episode of the thirty-first season of the American animated sitcom The Simpsons, and the 684th episode overall. It debuted on Fox on May 17, 2020. The episode was directed by Matthew Faughnan and written by Carolyn Omine. In this episode, Santa's Little Helper bites matriarch Marge, causing the family to reflect on the difficult life that the dog led prior to being adopted by the family and they end up reuniting him with his mother to avoid having to euthanize him.

The episode is dedicated in memory of Little Richard, who previously appeared in the episode "Special Edna" and had died on May 9, 2020. It also includes footage from the series premiere "Simpsons Roasting on an Open Fire".

The episode has received positive reception from critics.

== Plot ==
Santa's Little Helper is agitated by the sights, sounds, and smells of the Simpsons' Christmas celebration: he refuses to be affectionate, tears apart the couch, and stares idly at a smudge on the cabinet. Lisa suggests attending a seminar from dog psychologist Elaine Wolff. Wolff mostly berates dog owners and her talk is not helpful, but when Lisa tries to ask her to help the Simpsons to empathize with Santa's Little Helper, she explains that they are underestimating how his sense of smell is strongly tied to memory, and it brings back memories of when he was an abused racing dog. When Marge reaches for a Santa Claus hat that the dog has been keeping next to him, he nips at her on the hand.

Bart insists on sleeping outside with the dog overnight. The next day, they take him to an incompetent vet who wants to euthanize him. He calls the police and Chief Wiggum comes to their house with a dog exterminator close behind. Moments before animal control is set to arrive, Wolff appears at the door saying that she has had a revelation and wants to save him.

She runs off with Santa's Little Helper, and they go to her therapy institute, where she has an opportunity to communicate with him. She determines that the event causing his post-traumatic stress disorder goes back to his childhood, and she sets out to find his origin. At the No Kill Kennel, dog trainer Les Moore explains how he took Santa's Little Helper from his mother She-Biscuit because he ran to her so quickly. The family is outraged, but their hearts are quickly warmed when the mother and son are reunited in Moore's yard. The Simpsons adopt She-Biscuit and give her a happy home.

== Production ==
In December 2019, it was reported that Cate Blanchett would guest star in the season finale as a canine psychologist.

Michael York, the voice actor for the character Clayton, recorded his dialogue with producer/engineer Zach Zurn at Carpet Booth Studios in Rochester, Minnesota. York has since relocated to Rochester in 2022.

== Reception ==
=== Viewing figures ===
The episode earned a 0.6 rating and was watched by 1.89 million viewers, which was the most watched show on Fox that night.

=== Critical response ===
Writing for The A.V. Club, Dennis Perkins gave the episode a B, praising it for the attempt to do a serious study of the character of Santa's Little Helper but noting that the finale was too sentimental.

Den of Geek's Tony Sokol gave the episode four out of five stars for its emotional depth and its ability to make the show's past more rich.

== See also ==
- "Simpsons Roasting on an Open Fire", the premiere episode of the series featuring the family adopting Santa's Little Helper.
