= Mr. Jambo =

1. REDIRECT Kyle Gordon
