= Livin La Pura Vida =

- The Simpsons episode
- Episode no.: Season 31; Episode 7
- Directed by: Timothy Bailey
- Written by: Brian Kelley
- Production code: ZABF03
- Original air date: November 17, 2019

Guest appearance
- Fortune Feimster as Evelyn

Episode chronology
← Previous "Marge the Lumberjill"	Next → "Thanksgiving of Horror"
- The Simpsons season 31

"Livin La Pura Vida" is the seventh episode of the thirty-first season of the American animated television series The Simpsons, and the 669th episode overall. It aired in the United States on Fox on November 17, 2019. The writer was Brian Kelley, and the director was Timothy Bailey.

In this episode, the Simpson family is invited on the Van Houten's group trip to Costa Rica. Fortune Feimster guest starred as Evelyn. The episode received positive reviews.

== Plot ==
When Marge picks up Bart at the Van Houten house, Luann invites the Simpson family to their annual trip to Costa Rica, and the family accepts. Lisa overhears Homer and Marge discuss how expensive the trip will get and becomes worried about the cost.

At the airport, the Simpsons meet with the Van Houtens, the Hibberts, Superintendent Chalmers and Shauna, and Patty and her new girlfriend Evelyn. Though Homer tries to be nice to Evelyn, she disparages him after what she heard about him. In Costa Rica, Lisa gets more worried as Kirk tracks the expenses and will split the checks at the end.

At dinner at the Van Houten vacation home, Homer and Evelyn discover they have much in common. The next morning, Homer and Evelyn stay at the beach while the other guests go shopping. However, they return to find the two drunk and sunburned. Marge makes Homer promise to behave so she can get the perfect photo of them.

Homer and Marge snap the photo at a waterfall, but a splash from Evelyn knocks the phone into the water. At dinner, Patty blames Marge for making Homer reduce her girlfriend to his level. Marge says Evelyn ruined everything for her and is a bad influence on Homer because she acts just like him. Patty is horrified and breaks up with Evelyn.

Lisa reveals her financial concerns to Bart, so he suggests showing their parents the expenses in Kirk's book. They sneak into the master bedroom and find what Lisa believes to be priceless artifacts, which Lisa thinks the Van Houtens are smuggling to pay for their vacation. When she exposes this, Kirk says they are salt and pepper shakers that were meant to be gifts for the families.

The Simpsons decide to leave. Because Kirk charged them extra for ruining the trip, the family tries to take the shakers but discovers a painting of Kirkedemious Van Houten, who built the house the Van Houtens own. They confront the Van Houtens for making people pay while they use the house for free. Meanwhile, Marge apologizes to Patty. She says that while Homer hates her, Evelyn loves her. Patty agrees to reconcile with Evelyn.

Kirk refunds the families. Homer wants to retake the photo, but Marge says their vacation is not about being perfect but is about living in the moment. Meanwhile, Patty and Evelyn kiss on the zipline.

== Production ==
Fortune Feimster guest starred as Evelyn, Patty's new girlfriend.

== Reception ==
=== Viewing figures ===
The episode earned a 0.8 rating with a 4 share and was watched by 2.08 million viewers, which was the most watched show on Fox that night.

=== Critical response ===
Tony Sokol of Den of Geek gave this episode three stars out of five, stating ""Livin' la Pura Vida" a beach drink without an umbrella. While there is plenty of fodder for a variety of jokes, it is light on the comedy. The country goes unmolested and the only family to get ribbed is the Simpsons, who once again live up to their reputation of not living up to the community standard even when the standards are lowered. The family didn't get into the country club in season 7's "Scenes from the Class Struggle in Springfield," and now they aspire to the Van Houtens. There needs to be more struggle and less class".

Dennis Perkins of The A.V. Club gave this episode a B+, stating "'Livin La Pura Vida' is one of the better recent excursions, though, credited writer Brian Kelley steering the family’s group vacation to the Van Houten’s favorite getaway spot in Costa Rica around the sub-genre’s worst pitfalls, while managing to tell a coherent story from beginning to end. There’s even something of a nifty little mystery in how the seemingly no-more well-off Van Houtens are able to afford their annual multi-family trip, and some above-average character work to address the usually ignored financial stress the Simpsons’ single-episode world traveling would cause".

Carol Vaughn of The Costa Rica Star thought the episode was "very imaginative" in portraying Costa Rica such as inventing new cocktails that the characters drink and said the depiction of the country was "exceedingly favorable."

=== Awards and nominations ===
Brian Kelley received a nomination for the Writers Guild of America Award for Outstanding Writing in Animation at the 72nd Writers Guild of America Awards for his script to this episode.
