= The Tipping Point (The Simpsons) =

- The Simpsons episode
- Episode no.: Season 35; Episode 17
- Directed by: Matthew Nastuk
- Written by: J. Stewart Burns
- Production code: 35ABF11
- Original air date: May 12, 2024

Guest appearances
- Kyle Gordon as DJ Crazy Times; Chrissi Poland as Ms. Biljana Electronica; Audrey Trullinger as Euro Cashier

Episode chronology
← Previous "The Tell-Tale Pants"	Next → "Bart's Brain"
- The Simpsons season 35

"The Tipping Point" is the seventeenth and penultimate episode of the thirty-fifth season of the American animated television series The Simpsons, and the 767th episode overall. It aired in the United States on Fox on May 12, 2024. The episode was directed by Matthew Nastuk and written by J. Stewart Burns.

In this episode, Homer's attitude towards tipping gets him into trouble when he accidentally gives a large gratuity that he cannot afford but is praised for it. Kyle Gordon, Chrissi Poland, and Audrey Trullinger guest starred. The episode received mixed reviews.

== Plot ==
After spending the day at doctor's appointments, the Simpson family members reward themselves with treats at various restaurants. Homer is annoyed by each cashier's insistence that he give a tip. When the family sits down at the final restaurant for a meal, Homer is relieved that the gratuity is included with the bill. However, the waitress says that there is an option for an additional tip. Angered, he writes a message on the bill in which he tips one dollar. As they leave, the waitress chases after them. She thanks Homer because she misinterpreted the tip and message as $10,000. Fearing the wait-staff would assault him if he cancels it, he lets her keep it despite Marge's protests.

Later, Marge yells at Homer because they cannot afford the tip even though it has made him famous. She forces him to go cancel it. On the way, he buys a newspaper commemorating his act at a newsstand. People surround him to see how much he will tip the seller. Homer gives him all the cash in his wallet, causing the crowd to praise him. He continues to give large tips wherever he goes, but Marge says they are out of money. Unable to stop tipping, Homer is ashamed to return home to his family. He goes to the waitress' boathouse to find comfort, but she defends herself, and he falls into the water.

Homer is retrieved by a crabbing ship near Little Europe, where tipping is illegal. With Homer missing, Bart and Lisa search for him. When they find him, they ask him to come home. He wants to stay because of the lack of tipping culture, but Lisa says he can bring that mentality back to Springfield. When he returns, Homer announces his idea at the Servers of America Guild awards, but he is assaulted by the servers in attendance. Marge comforts Homer and forgives him. Later, she has him work as a waiter to recover their money.

== Production ==
Comedian Kyle Gordon guest starred as DJ Crazy Times, Chrissi Poland guest starred as Ms. Biljana Electronica, and Audrey Trullinger guest starred as Euro Cashier.

== Cultural references ==
Homer performs a parody of the song "Planet of the Bass," in which Gordon and Poland reprise their roles from the music video and in which Trullinger also appears.

== Reception ==
=== Viewing figures ===
The episode earned a 0.16 rating with 0.72 million viewers, which was the most-watched show on Fox that night.

=== Critical response ===
John Schwarz of Bubbleblabber gave the episode an 8 out of 10. He thought the subject matter was relevant for the current time and praised the touches from executive producer Michael Price.

Alex Reif of Laughing Place enjoyed the musical numbers and liked that there was no subplot. Reif also enjoyed that the episode was focused on Homer, which does not occur as often in recent seasons.

Cathal Gunning of Screen Rant did not like the parody of "Planet of the Bass" because the meme was already dated by the time the episode aired. Gunning would have preferred that the show focus on the characters rather than a phenomenon that does not last.

Stacey Henley of TheGamer also thought that the "Planet of the Bass" parody was dated, given the long production cycle of the episode, and that the original song was barely popular. Henley thought the show worked best when it focuses on themes that are timeless.
