= Todd, Todd, Why Hast Thou Forsaken Me? =

- The Simpsons episode
- Episode no.: Season 31; Episode 9
- Directed by: Chris Clements
- Written by: Tim Long; Miranda Thompson
- Production code: ZABF04
- Original air date: December 1, 2019

Guest appearances
- Glenn Close as Mona Simpson; Marcia Wallace as Edna Krabappel (archive recording)

Episode features
- Chalkboard gag: Todd writes "Idle hands are the Devil's tools" with two hands.
- Couch gag: Ned, Todd and Rod arrive at where their couch would be, but Ned tells his sons he gave it to the poor and they cheer.

Episode chronology
← Previous "Thanksgiving of Horror"	Next → "Bobby, It's Cold Outside"
- The Simpsons season 31

"Todd, Todd, Why Hast Thou Forsaken Me?" is the ninth episode of the thirty-first season of the American animated television series The Simpsons, and the 671st episode overall. It aired in the United States on Fox on December 1, 2019. The episode was written by Tim Long & Miranda Thompson and was directed by Chris Clements.

In this episode, Todd rejects God because his mother is dead, so Ned turns to Homer for help. The episode received mixed reviews.

== Plot ==
Maude Flanders appears in a dream to Ned as a ghost. Ned cries and asks Todd if he ever dreams about his mother. Todd confesses he no longer remembers what she looks like. After watching Christmas tapes of their family in an attempt to jog his memories of Maude, Todd starts having doubts about Maude being in a better place.

At church, Reverend Lovejoy invites the kids to say what they would want to say to baby Jesus if they could speak to him and Todd says he would angrily tell him thanks for nothing because his mom is dead and that he no longer believes in God, shocking everyone. Ned is shocked to the core and reprimands his actions, while Todd keeps questioning God's existence. The next morning, Todd refuses to say Amen to the prayer for the breakfast and Ned asks himself what can put fear of God back in Todd. After seeing Bart trick Homer into staying outside in his underwear, Ned asks the Simpsons to look after Todd for a while and help him rediscover his beliefs in God. This proves futile.

Eventually, Todd tells Homer the reason he does not believe is because his mother is never coming back and asks Homer if he knows what he feels. Homer remembers his mother, Mona, and when she died, making him cry, too. Homer goes to Moe's Tavern to forget, but is surprisingly joined by Ned. The two get drunk before getting hit by Hans Moleman's car. They are greeted in Heaven by Ned's second wife, Edna Krabappel, and Maude, John the Baptist, and God. After a movie argument with Abraham Lincoln, God informs them they are not dead. They are merely in a coma with their families at their hospital beds. After seeing even Bart praying, Todd prays to God, Jesus, and Buddha to bring his dad back. Ned returns to his body. Homer is then met by Mona and finally has a chance to say goodbye to her before he, too, regains consciousness and the families are reunited.

At night, Rod and Todd dream of Maude tucking them in while Edna's ghost shouts "Ha" to Ned.

== Reception ==
=== Viewing figures ===
The episode earned a 0.7 rating with a 3 share and was watched by 1.99 million viewers, which was the most watched show on Fox that night.

=== Critical response ===
Dennis Perkins of The A.V. Club gave this episode a B−, stating, “‘Todd, Todd, Why Hast Thou Forsaken Me?’ zooms in on—spoiler alert—Todd Flanders, and comes just about this close to making its exercise in shifting narrative focus on the Simpsons’ younger neighbor, the perpetual half of one-joke, something interesting."

Jesse Bereta of Bubbleblabber gave this episode 6.5 out of 10 points.

Tony Sokol of Den of Geek gave this episode four and a half stars out of five and said, “it is as perfect an installment as any modern day Simpson episode.”
