= Frinkcoin =

- The Simpsons episode
- Episode no.: Season 31; Episode 13
- Directed by: Steven Dean Moore
- Written by: Rob LaZebnik
- Production code: ZABF07
- Original air date: February 23, 2020

Guest appearances
- Beanie Feldstein as Celebrity Executive Assistant Therapist; Ed "Too Tall" Jones as himself; Jim Parsons as himself

Episode features
- Couch gag: The Simpsons are anthropomorphic cats trying to find their way to the couch, when a normal Mr. Burns releases the hounds on them.

Episode chronology
← Previous "The Miseducation of Lisa Simpson"	Next → "Bart the Bad Guy"
- The Simpsons season 31

"Frinkcoin" is the 13th episode of the thirty-first season of the American animated television series The Simpsons, and the 675th episode overall. It aired in the United States on Fox on February 23, 2020. The episode was written by Rob LaZebnik and was directed by Steven Dean Moore.

In this episode, Professor Frink invents a cryptocurrency that make him rich and popular, but he learns that they only like him for his money. Former football player Ed "Too Tall" Jones and actor Jim Parsons appeared as themselves. The episode received positive reviews.

== Plot ==
The Simpson family are eating at The Lentil Institution, a vegan restaurant, vying for Lisa to choose them for her "Most interesting person I know" paper, but she chooses Professor Frink, devoted to helping the world through science. At Springfield University, Lisa visits and interviews him. After explaining the story of his life, Frink says he is developing a new cryptocurrency, Frinkcoin.

Frinkcoin becomes famous and Frink becomes the richest man in town, enraging Mr. Burns. Frink however feels empty inside, so Lisa tries to help him. He moves from his university office to Chicago, but still feels sad. Marge suggests Homer takes him to Moe's Tavern. Frink aces Moe's trivia questions and earns the respect and friendship of the barflies. He begins taking them to Springfield's finest establishments.

Smithers assembles a team to create Burns Coin and develop a formula to devaluate Frinkcoin, but the calculations would take thousands of years. Burns decides to break Frink's spirit instead, showing Frink that his new friends only like him for his money. Burns brings the equation in the center of town for an instant crowdsourcing solution. Meanwhile, Frink tests the sincerity of his friends; all of them fail.

A solution to the equation gets posted on the whiteboard; Lisa realizes that it was posted by Frink himself, losing all his money in the process, and they become best friends. In the end, he returns to the university and kisses the professor whose office he shares.

== Production ==
Actor Jim Parsons appeared as himself, explaining how cryptocurrency works. Former football player Ed "Too Tall" Jones also appeared as himself.

== Reception ==
=== Viewing figures ===
The episode earned a 0.7 rating and was watched by 1.84 million viewers, which was the most watched show on Fox that night.

=== Critical response ===
Dennis Perkins of The A.V. Club gave this episode a B, stating that the episode "uses the cryptocurrency concept as an excuse for a largely successful exercise in side-character development."

Tony Sokol of Den of Geek gave this episode 4 out of 5 stars. He described the episode as satisfying and highlighted the Frink and Lisa relationship.

=== Awards and nominations ===
On July 28, 2020, Hank Azaria was nominated for a Primetime Emmy Award for Outstanding Character Voice-Over Performance for this episode at the 72nd Primetime Creative Arts Emmy Awards.
