= The Miseducation of Lisa Simpson =

- The Simpsons episode
- Episode no.: Season 31; Episode 12
- Directed by: Matthew Nastuk
- Written by: J. Stewart Burns
- Production code: ZABF06
- Original air date: February 16, 2020

Guest appearances
- John Legend as himself; Chrissy Teigen as herself; Zach Woods as Zane Furlong

Episode chronology
← Previous "Hail to the Teeth"	Next → "Frinkcoin"
- The Simpsons season 31

"The Miseducation of Lisa Simpson" is the 12th episode of the thirty-first season of the American animated television series The Simpsons, and the 674th episode overall. It aired in the United States on Fox on February 16, 2020. The episode was written by J. Stewart Burns and was directed by Matthew Nastuk.

In this episode, a new school is built where an algorithm designs the education for each child. Zach Woods guest starred as Zane Furlong. Musician John Legend and model Chrissy Teigen appeared as themselves. The episode received mixed reviews.

== Plot ==
In an alpine bar in 1980, a German officer demands a young Sea Captain and his wife hand over their half of a treasure map. The couple spits alcohol into a candle and start a fire. Escaping with both halves of the map, the couple heads to Springfield in search of the treasure. Forty years later, the Sea Captain finds it, but Mayor Quimby says it belongs to the town after being alerted by the former's estranged wife just the day before. At a town meeting to spend the money, Marge suggests building a STEM school to teach children success for the future. The residents are skeptical, but with John Legend and Chrissy Teigen's help, they agree to the idea. At the STEM school, run by Zane Furlong, Bart enjoys his video game-infused education, while Lisa is accepted into the gifted class, where she learns the school is run by an algorithm to determine the best education for the kids.

At a career day meeting at the school, Homer speaks about his job as safety inspector at the nuclear power plant. However, Furlong disparages this as one of several jobs that will be taken over by automation. At the plant, Homer's fears seem confirmed when an automated soda machine is installed in the break room. Wanting to prove humans can mix drinks better than machines, Homer competes with the soda machine until he is exhausted. However, he believes his job will not be taken over by robots for now.

Meanwhile, Lisa discovers that the kids outside of her gifted class are being trained to do menial jobs. She attempts to warn the other kids, but Bart convinces them to embrace their education and career prospects. Lisa tries to rewrite the algorithm to give the other kids real STEM education, but Bart stops her. They fight until Furlong stops them and uses the algorithm to determine the jobs of the future. To their horror, the algorithm determines the only job will be elder care. Bart and Lisa warn the kids, and the horrified students negatively rate the algorithm, causing the server to explode and destroy the school. As Bart and Lisa mope over their worthless future, Homer comforts Marge, assuring her she will find another way to provide education to the town.

Later, Furlong, working as a food delivery driver, visits the Simpsons. Bart and Lisa ask him what the jobs of the future will be. He says technology is changing quickly and could bring about positive prospects. In the future, sentient soda machines force residents like adult Bart and Lisa to work as slave bartenders while others like Carl fly around space in luxury cruisers.

== Production ==
In August 2019, Fox announced that John Legend and Chrissy Teigen would guest star as themselves when Marge recruits them for an education proposal. Zach Woods guest starred as Zane.

== Reception ==
=== Viewing figures ===
The episode earned a 0.7 rating and was watched by 1.95 million viewers, which was the most watched show on Fox that night.

=== Critical response ===
Dennis Perkins of The A.V. Club gave this episode a B− stated "As 'The Simpsons' has aged, it's occasionally fleshed out some of its supporting characters. Sometimes it's to (with very mixed success) update a problematic stereotype to something resembling cultural acceptability. Other times, the practice smacks of needing to fill out a season order...Then there are those episodes that seize upon a theretofore one-dimensional joke character's potential to be a bit more of a human being. (Although, technically, still one-dimensional, being a cartoon and all.) Barney's entry, the hauntingly self-excoriating 'Pukahontas,' in the Springfield Film Festival remains an early, legendary example of a sidekick stepping forward to steal the show".

Tony Sokol of Den of Geek gave this episode a 3 of 5 stars. He stated that the episode showed how all noble ideas can be corrupted, and that the best parts of the episode occurred at the beginning.
