= The Hateful Eight-Year-Olds =

- The Simpsons episode
- Episode no.: Season 31; Episode 21
- Directed by: Jennifer Moller
- Written by: Joel H. Cohen
- Production code: ZABF14
- Original air date: May 10, 2020

Guest appearances
- Brian Bell as Sailor's Delight member and himself; Rivers Cuomo as Sailor's Delight member and himself; Joey King as Addy; Camila Mendes as Tessa Rose; Madelaine Petsch as Sloan; Lili Reinhart as Bella-Ella; Scott Shriner as Sailor's Delight member and himself; Lilly Singh as Kensey; Patrick Wilson as Sailor's Delight member and himself

Episode chronology
← Previous "Warrin' Priests"	Next → "The Way of the Dog"
- The Simpsons season 31

"The Hateful Eight-Year-Olds" is the 21st and penultimate episode of the thirty-first season of the American animated television series The Simpsons, and the 683rd episode overall. It aired in the United States on Fox on May 10, 2020. The episode was written by Joel H. Cohen and was directed by Jennifer Moller.

In this episode, Lisa is invited to a sleepover by her new friend Addy, but learns that she is being used as a cover to prevent the latter from being bullied. Meanwhile, Homer and Marge go on a sunset cruise. In addition to Weezer, who appeared as the band Sailor's Delight and as themselves, Joey King, Camila Mendes, Madelaine Petsch, Lili Reinhart, and Lilly Singh guest starred. Maggie Simpson does not appear in the episode. The episode received positive reviews.

== Plot ==
Lisa is invited to Addy Lancer's birthday party; Lisa bonded with her over a mutual love of books and horses. Bart makes fun of Lisa's love of horses, causing her to symbolically sever their sibling relationship. Addy turns out to be quite wealthy, with horses of her own. Her friends, however, are cruel and cliquish, and quickly begin to bully Lisa, but Addy refuses to join in. Addy excuses herself to the bathroom to talk to Lisa, and tearfully admits that she invited her so that the girls would have someone besides her to make fun of, like they have been doing for years. Lisa gives her a hug and says that if Addy's friends bully her all the time, then they were not her friends to begin with. Addy doesn't believe this and starts to behave erratically, saying that Lisa should bring a similar nerdy friend so the girls can bully her and Lisa can be like them. Lisa runs away as Addy asks to put strips on her teeth.

Unable to contact her parents who are on a sunset cruise, Lisa calls Bart for help. Bart arrives, but insists that Lisa get revenge on the girls by mutilating their hair as they sleep. Caught in the act, Addy comes to Lisa's rescue by taking the blame, allowing her and Bart to escape. She symbolically severs her friendships with the girls, saying that she can be just as cruel as they are, which they respect.

Meanwhile, Homer takes Marge on a booze cruise. After getting in a fight with the band's singer who he thinks is hitting on Marge, Homer nearly ruins the trip. He reminds the crowd that leaving the house is hardly a pleasure for middle-aged people, and the passengers are inclined to agree.

== Production ==
Camila Mendes guest starred as Tessa Rose, Madelaine Petsch guest starred as Sloan, and Lili Reinhart guest starred as Bella-Ella. The three actresses co-starred on the television series Riverdale at the time of the episode's airing. Also guest starring were Joey King as Addy and Lilly Singh as Kensey.

The band Weezer appeared as the band Sailor's Delight. The band played several of their songs during the episode, including the premiere of their song "Blue Dream." They also performed a cover version of the show's theme at the end of the episode.

== Reception ==
=== Viewing figures ===
The episode earned a 0.5 rating and was watched by 1.40 million viewers, which was the most watched show on Fox that night.

=== Critical response ===
Tony Sokol of Den of Geek gave this episode 4 out of 5 stars, stating “The episode works because everything in the end is Simpsonized. The family character prevails in all social situations. Lisa doesn’t only remind her friend Addy of the important things in life. She inspires her to ditch her overinflated fake friends, which lead them to want to be real friends with her. Homer gets to give a rousing speech, not only to save his and Marge’s lives, but also to prod the people around him to be better people, to stay home and watch TV. ‘The Hateful Eight-Year-Olds’ is loaded with message, but also has its share of laughs.”

Jesse Bereta of Bubbleblabber gave the episode a 6 out of 10. Bereta thought the episode was average with a strong Lisa story. However, Bereta thought the same themes had been done better before.
