= Better Off Ned =

- The Simpsons episode
- Episode no.: Season 31; Episode 16
- Directed by: Rob Oliver
- Story by: Al Jean
- Teleplay by: Joel H. Cohen; Jeff Westbrook
- Production code: ZABF11
- Original air date: March 15, 2020

Episode features
- Chalkboard gag: "Bart is at a doctor's appointment" (written by Lisa)
- Couch gag: Comic Book Guy is tracking the family trip home on Uber, then rates the trip one star and doesn't tip the driver.

Episode chronology
← Previous "Screenless"	Next → "Highway to Well"
- The Simpsons season 31

"Better Off Ned" is the 16th episode of the thirty-first season of the American animated television series The Simpsons, and the 678th episode overall. It aired in the United States on Fox on March 15, 2020. The episode was directed by Rob Oliver and was written by Joel H. Cohen and Jeff Westbrook from a story by Al Jean.

In this episode, Ned mentors Bart, so a jealous Homer mentors Nelson. The episode received generally negative reviews.

The episode was dedicated to actor Max von Sydow, who died one week earlier, and had previously guest-starred in the season 25 episode "The War of Art" as Klaus Ziegler.

== Plot ==
At the Springfield Retirement Castle Grampa gives Bart a dud grenade after pranking him with it.

Bart takes it to a school assembly and pranks everyone the same way Grampa did, scaring everyone away while ambulances and firefighters are called. Ned Flanders throws himself on top of the grenade to sacrifice himself and Bart is forced to reveal the prank. Superintendent Chalmers wants to expel Bart from school, but Ned intervenes, volunteering to supervise Bart the right way, with the three P's: "persistence, prayer and persistent prayer".

At the Flanders house, Bart tries Ned's patience, so Ned takes him fishing. Bart catches a fish, and Ned teaches him how to roast it on a fire. Bart also joins the church choir, and everyone congratulates Ned for turning Bart around. The news about Ned's influence on Bart spreads around Springfield, making Homer jealous.

Feeling useless, Homer walks around the city until he finds a sad Nelson Muntz at the Springfield City Dump, crying due to his situation at home. Homer brings him to Krusty Burger and offers to become his mentor, making Bart jealous. Seeing the problems that he is causing, Lisa asks Homer to seek counseling. Homer goes to a therapist that disagrees with his methods. Homer goes then to see Nelson, but finds his mother, who asks him if he is going to leave them too, like all the other men have in the past, breaking Nelson's heart.

When Homer explains the situation to Nelson, Nelson prepares a plan to get even with Bart at the Christian Pride Parade, trying to activate the mechanism that Bart and the Flanders built, the praying hands, when Bart passes through. Homer spots Nelson, and pushes Bart away in time, getting squashed by the hands himself. The two ride in the ambulance together. Homer apologizes to Nelson and guides him to Ned as a mentor.

== Production ==
The episode was dedicated in memory of Max von Sydow who appeared in the twenty-fifth season episode "The War of Art."

== Reception ==
=== Viewing figures ===
The episode earned a 0.6 rating and was watched by 1.70 million viewers, which was the most watched show on Fox that night.

=== Critical response ===
Dennis Perkins of The A.V. Club gave this episode a C−, stating that “‘Better Off Ned’ isn’t just a lousy half-hour (minus commercials, minus three episode-ending tags in place of any sort of resolution) of The Simpsons because it’s double-dipping on the same premise. It’s a truly lousy episode because it fairly rings with indifference, glib cruelty, and enough lamp-shading of creative exhaustion to serve as platonic ideal for late-run ‘is that show still on?’ disposability”.

Tony Sokol of Den of Geek gave this episode 3 out of 5 stars. He did not have the sense that Ned could have won over Bart like he did in previous episodes. He also felt the comedy could have been better and edgier.

=== Awards and nominations ===
Actor Nancy Cartwright was nominated for a Primetime Emmy Award for Outstanding Character Voice-Over Performance at the 72nd Primetime Creative Arts Emmy Awards as Bart Simpson, Nelson, Ralph, and Todd for this episode.
