= J. Stewart Burns =

American television writer and producer

- Born: Joseph Stewart Burns; December 4, 1969 (age 56)
- Occupations: Writer; producer
- Years active: 1999–present
- Known for: The Simpsons, Futurama, Unhappily Ever After

Joseph Stewart Burns (born December 4, 1969) is a television writer and producer most notable for his work on The Simpsons, Futurama, and Unhappily Ever After.

== Education ==
Burns attended Harvard University, where he wrote for the Harvard Lampoon.

Noted in the DVD commentaries of "The Deep South" and "Roswell That Ends Well", Burns has an M.A. in Mathematics from the University of California, Berkeley, where he studied under John Rhodes. Burns is partly credited for The Simpsons' inclusion of a number of complex mathematical concepts and jokes within the series.

Burns was famously referenced in a 1993 Newsweek article about his decision to jump from pursuing a graduate degree in mathematics to writing comedy: "You could read the entire story of American decline in that one career move."

== Career ==
Burns got his start by writing for Beavis and Butthead. Since then, he has written for The Simpsons, Futurama, and Unhappily Ever After.

Aside from writing on the original series, Burns also wrote the script for the 2003 Futurama video game as well as one of the Spyro games, Spyro: A Hero's Tail (2004). Burns developed and has served as the game runner of The Simpsons: Tapped Out since its inception.

=== Awards ===
Burns has won the Emmy Award for Outstanding Animation Program four times — for Futurama in 2002, and for The Simpsons in 2006, 2008 and 2019.

== Writing credits ==
=== Futurama episodes ===
- "My Three Suns" (1999)
- "Mars University" (1999)
- "A Head in the Polls" (1999)
- "The Deep South" (2000)
- "The Cryonic Woman" (2000)
- "Roswell That Ends Well" (2001)
- "Where the Buggalo Roam" (2002)
- "Neutopia" (2011)

=== The Simpsons episodes ===
- "Moe Baby Blues" (2003)
- "The Way We Weren't" (2004)
- "There's Something About Marrying" (2005)
- "The Monkey Suit" (2006)
- "Homerazzi" (2007)
- "Marge Gamer" (2007)
- "Eternal Moonshine of the Simpson Mind" (2007)
- "Waverly Hills 9-0-2-1-D'oh" (2009)
- "Holidays of Future Passed" (2011)
- "The D'oh-cial Network" (2012)
- "What Animated Women Want" (2013)
- "Steal This Episode" (2014)
- "Days of Future Future" (2014)
- "Simpsorama" (2014)
- "Every Man's Dream" (2015)
- "Puffless" (2015)
- "Fland Canyon" (2016)
- "Friends and Family" (2016)
- "Dogtown" (2017)
- "Flanders' Ladder" (2018)
- "Treehouse of Horror XXX" (2019)
- "The Miseducation of Lisa Simpson" (2020)
- "Screenless" (2020)
- "Mother and Child Reunion" (2021)
- "Write Off This Episode" (2023)
- "The Tipping Point" (2024)
- "The Last Man Expanding" (2025)
- "Yellow Planet" (2025)
- "Testing 1-2-3" (2026)

== Supervising producer credits ==
=== The Simpsons episodes ===
- "The Great Louse Detective" (2002)
- "Special Edna" (2003)
- "The Dad Who Knew Too Little" (2003)
- "The Strong Arms of the Ma" (2003)
- "Pray Anything" (2003)
- "Barting Over" (2003)
- "I'm Spelling As Fast As I Can" (2003)
- "A Star Is Born Again" (2003)
- "Mr. Spritz Goes to Washington" (2003)
- "C.E. D'oh" (2003)
- "'Scuse Me While I Miss the Sky" (2003)
- "Three Gays of the Condo" (2003)
- "Dude, Where's My Ranch?" (2003)
- "Old Yeller-Belly" (2003)
- "Brake My Wife, Please" (2003)
- "Moe Baby Blues" (2003)
- "The Bart of War" (2003)
- "Treehouse of Horror XIV" (2003) (starring as "Here Lies J. Stewart Burns")
- "My Mother the Carjacker" (2003)
- "The President Wore Pearls" (2003)
- "The Regina Monologues" (2003)
- "The Fat and the Furriest" (2003)

== Co-executive producer credits ==
=== The Simpsons episodes ===
- "Today I Am a Clown" (2003)
- "'Tis the Fifteenth Season" (2003)
- "Marge vs. Singles, Seniors, Childless Couples and Teens and Gays" (2004)
- "I, (Annoyed Grunt)-bot" (2004)
- "Diatribe of a Mad Housewife" (2004)
- "Margical History Tour" (2004)
- "Milhouse Doesn't Live Here Anymore" (2004)
- "Smart and Smarter" (2004)
- "The Ziff Who Came to Dinner" (2004)
- "Co-Dependents' Day" (2004)
- "The Wandering Juvie" (2004)
- "My Big Fat Geek Wedding" (2004)
- "Catch 'Em If You Can" (2004)
- "Simple Simpson" (2004)
- "The Way We Weren't" (2004)
- "Bart-Mangled Banner" (2004)
- "Fraudcast News" (2004)
- The Simpsons season 16
- The Simpsons season 17
- The Simpsons season 18
- The Simpsons season 19
- The Simpsons season 20
- The Simpsons season 21
- The Simpsons season 22
- The Simpsons season 23
- The Simpsons season 24
- The Simpsons season 25
- The Simpsons season 26
- The Simpsons season 27
- The Simpsons season 28
- The Simpsons season 29
- The Simpsons season 30
- The Simpsons season 31
- The Simpsons season 32
- The Simpsons season 33
- The Simpsons season 34
- The Simpsons season 35
- The Simpsons season 36
- The Simpsons season 37

=== Unhappily Ever After episodes ===
- "Meter Maid"
- "Getting More Than Some"
- "College!"
- "Experimenting in College"
- "Making the Grade"
- "Teacher's Pet"
- "Excorsising Jennie"
- "Shampoo"
- "Rock 'n' Roll"
- "Lightning Boy"
- "The Tell-Tale Lipstick"
- "Jack The Ripper"
- "The Great Depression"
- "The Rat"
