= Bart the Bad Guy =

- The Simpsons episode
- Poster of the episode with a homage to the Avengers: Infinity War poster.
- Episode no.: Season 31; Episode 14
- Directed by: Jennifer Moeller
- Written by: Dan Vebber
- Production code: ZABF08
- Original air date: March 1, 2020

Guest appearances
- Kevin Feige as Chinnos; Tal Fishman as Reaction Guy; Taran Killam as Glen Tangier, Airshot; Joe Mantegna as Fat Tony; Anthony Russo as Movie Executive #2; Joe Russo as Movie Executive #1; Cobie Smulders as Hydrangea

Episode chronology
← Previous "Frinkcoin"	Next → "Screenless"
- The Simpsons season 31

"Bart the Bad Guy" is the 14th episode of the thirty-first season of the American animated television series The Simpsons, and the 676th episode overall. It aired in the United States on Fox on March 1, 2020. The episode was written by Dan Vebber and was directed by Jennifer Moeller.

In the episode, Bart accidentally sees a new superhero film, one month before its intended release, and uses his knowledge to terrorize the other fans by threatening to spoil it. Two executive producers of the film attempt to prevent Bart from leaking any more news to the public. The episode received positive reviews.

The episode parodies the Marvel Cinematic Universe (MCU) and the Avengers films, specifically on the spoiler phenomenon revolving around Avengers: Infinity War and Avengers: Endgame. MCU film producer Kevin Feige, Infinity War and Endgame directors Joe and Anthony Russo, and MCU actress Cobie Smulders make voice cameos in the episode. Smulders' husband, Taran Killam, also guest stars.

== Plot ==
Numerous Springfield citizens watch Vindicators Crystal War, the new film in a Marble Cinematic Universe superhero franchise called Vindicators. When the film ends on a cliffhanger in which the villain kills the film's heroes, the audience is shocked and saddened by the bleak cliffhanger. They eagerly anticipate the concluding sequel which doesn't come out for a year, much to their impatience.

Eleven months later and one month before the release of Vindicators Crystal War 2: Resurgence, Milhouse is injured while Bart attempts a YouTube stunt. One of the stars of Vindicators, actor Glen Tangier a.k.a. "The Tasmanian Adonis" who plays the superhero Airshot, mistakes Bart for Milhouse while visiting him at the hospital and passes out drunk. Bart hijacks his laptop where he finds and views a cut of the unreleased final Vindicators film that night. With knowledge of the film's key moments and plot reveals, Bart decides to visit Comic Book Guy to exchange the spoilers for an expensive comic book. However, Comic Book Guy instead gives away all of his products so he doesn't get the film spoiled for himself. Realizing the power he has, armed with the film's spoilers, Bart decides to blackmail the town by threatening to spoil the ending of the film. When he attempts to blackmail his father, Homer tells Bart that he is immune to his spoiler power because he doesn't care about the Vindicators films. Instead, Bart lets Homer in on the deal, allowing him to scam free beer from Moe. Bart also exploits Lisa by giving her a chance to dance with Airshot (played by Tangier) at a school dance. After realizing that his power will mean nothing when the film finally opens in theaters, Bart's blackmailing escalates.

Milhouse berates Bart for stealing his visit from Airshot before Bart is kidnapped by the Marble film studio, who has been made aware of Bart's blackmailing and knowledge of the spoilers. Using virtual reality, the studio executives make him believe that his spoilers will actually kill the film's heroes in their universe if he leaks them. Bart refuses to reveal the spoilers to the film's villain to save the heroes, satisfying the studio executives. As a result, Bart stops blackmailing the town, and he succeeds in not spoiling the film until it finally premieres. However, the first Springfield audience to see the film in the theater inadvertently spoils the film on social media.

== Production ==
Promotional image of Chinnos

In October 2019, it was reported that Marvel Studios president Kevin Feige would guest star as an alien supervillain named Chinnos. The same month, a first look was shown of the characters played by directors Anthony and Joe Russo. In January 2020, another first look was shown of the characters played by Cobie Smulders and Taran Killam. In February 2020, executive producer Matt Selman unveiled a promotional poster for the episode.

== Cultural references ==
The film franchise in the episode is a parody of the Marvel Cinematic Universe, overseen by guest star Kevin Feige. The films involved in the episode's plot are parodies of Avengers: Infinity War and Avengers: Endgame, which were directed by guest stars Anthony and Joe Russo and which featured guest star Cobie Smulders. The final scenes mirror those in Charles Dickens' A Christmas Carol.

== Reception ==
=== Viewing figures ===
The episode earned a 0.6 rating and was watched by 1.66 million viewers, which was the most watched show on Fox that night.

=== Critical response ===
Writing for The A.V. Club, Dennis Perkins gave the episode a B, praising the parody elements but finding the Homer and Marge story weak.

Jesse Schedeen of IGN gave "Bart the Bad Guy" an 8/10, writing that "If you watch 'Bart the Bad Guy' solely to see the MCU taken down a peg, you may come away a little disappointed. [...] Luckily, [the episode] finds other, better avenues to explore, lampooning spoiler culture and making a familiar formula feel fresh and exciting again."

Tony Sokol of Den of Geek wrote, "Bart The Bad Guy strikes at the very heart of all of comic book culture." Going on to state, "The Simpsons remain current with this episode while subtly referencing and satirizing the comic book conspiracies." He gave the episode 3 out of 5 stars.

=== Awards and nominations ===
Writer Dan Vebber was nominated for a Writers Guild of America Award for Television: Animation for this episode at the 73rd Writers Guild of America Awards.
