= Bart's Brain =

- The Simpsons episode
- Episode no.: Season 35; Episode 18
- Directed by: Mike Frank Polcino
- Written by: Dan Vebber
- Production code: 35ABF12
- Original air date: May 19, 2024

Guest appearances
- Megan Mullally as Sarah Wiggum; Kerry Washington as Rayshelle Peyton

Episode chronology
← Previous "The Tipping Point"	Next → "Bart's Birthday"
- The Simpsons season 35

"Bart’s Brain" is the eighteenth and final episode of the thirty-fifth season of the American animated television series The Simpsons, and the 768th episode overall. It aired in the United States on Fox on May 19, 2024. The episode was directed by Mike Frank Polcino and written by Dan Vebber.

In this episode, Bart finds a human brain and begins to care for it, which makes his family worry about his reputation. Megan Mullally and Kerry Washington guest starred. The episode received positive reviews.

== Plot ==
The Simpson family moves Grampa into a smaller room at the retirement home to save money. Bart and Lisa help him get rid of his excess belongings that cannot fit in his new room. Bart takes Grampa's war memorabilia and trades it at Herman's store for credit. He finds a human brain in a jar and buys it with the credit, so he can prank people. At the cafeteria at Springfield Elementary School, he tells the children that the food is made from the brain, which causes the children to vomit. Instead of punishing him, Ms. Peyton makes Bart take care of the brain and journal his experiences while the other children take care of eggs.

Bart quickly tires of caring for the brain. Wanting to take a break, he asks Homer to care for it while he plays with Milhouse. Homer takes the brain to Moe's Tavern. Meanwhile, objects at Milhouse's home remind Bart of the brain, so he decides to go home. When Homer returns, Bart sees that Homer brought home a jar of pickled eggs. Bart searches for the brain and finds it with Kearney, Jimbo, and Dolph who plan to blow it up. Bart takes it back and names it Buddy while giving it a persona similar to his own. Bart begins to dutifully care for it even after completing his school assignment. His family begins to worry that the brain is ruining his reputation.

After Homer overhears the townsfolk talking about Bart and the brain, the family decides to isolate Bart at home. When Bart sees them sneaking off to church, they lie and tell him that he can stay home as a reward. Later, Bart arrives at church with the brain and sits with his family. Hearing the people and his family judge him for caring for a brain, Bart goes to the front of the church with the brain and declares it his best friend. Suddenly, the label on the brain jar falls off to reveal that brain belonged to Corbin Everly, an accountant who donated his body to Springfield University. Realizing the brain belonged to an actual person and is not the persona he gave it, Bart decides to return the brain to the university. Professor Frink finds the brain and takes it, telling it that he missed it. Before skating away, Bart calls Frink a weirdo.

== Production ==
Due to the 2023 Hollywood labor disputes, this season consisted of 18 episodes, which is shorter than most seasons. As a result, this episode became the season finale. Executive producer Matt Selman described the episode as "classic Simpsons."

Megan Mullally guest starred as Sarah Wiggum, and Kerry Washington guest starred as Rayshelle Peyton.

== Cultural references ==
The final scene of Bart returning the brain is a parody of the ending of the 2015 film Furious 7, including the song "See You Again" from the soundtrack of the film playing in the background. Bart is depicted as being a fan of the YouTuber MeatCanyon, who was happy for the show's acknowledgement of him.

== Reception ==
=== Viewing figures ===
The episode earned a 0.14 rating with 0.62 million viewers, which was the most-watched show on Fox that night.

=== Critical response ===
John Schwarz of Bubbleblabber gave the episode an 8 out of 10. He liked that the episode took the classic "take home egg" story and increased Bart's obsession with caring for the brain. He also highlighted the sight gags throughout the episode.

Mike Celestino of Laughing Place thought the episode was "funny and very strange." He was also not sure if the episode was trying to depict Marge's worrying about Bart as right or wrong.
