= Screenless (The Simpsons) =

- The Simpsons episode
- Episode no.: Season 31; Episode 15
- Directed by: Michael Polcino
- Written by: J. Stewart Burns
- Production code: ZABF09
- Original air date: March 8, 2020

Guest appearances
- Dana Gould as himself; Werner Herzog as Dr. Lund; Dr. Drew Pinsky as himself

Episode features
- Couch gag: Lisa arrives at the couch, just to realize the rest of the Simpson family forgot about daylight saving time, as they are absent.

Episode chronology
← Previous "Bart the Bad Guy"	Next → "Better Off Ned"
- The Simpsons season 31

"Screenless" is the 15th episode of the thirty-first season of the American animated television series The Simpsons, and the 677th episode overall. It aired in the United States on Fox on March 8, 2020. The episode was written by J. Stewart Burns and was directed by Michael Polcino.

In this episode, Marge limits the amount of time that the family can use their electronic devices, but she has the most difficult time of all of them. Werner Herzog guest starred as Dr. Lund. Comedian Dana Gould and media personality Drew Pinsky appeared as themselves. The episode received mixed reviews.

It was dedicated to James Lipton, who died on March 2, 2020 and had guest starred in the episodes "The Sweetest Apu" and "Homer the Father" respectively.

== Plot ==
The Simpson family is watching Marketing a Murder on TV. When Maggie tries to get their attention, Lisa switches to Baby Ein-sign, a show teaching babies sign language. Maggie was trying to tell them that Hans Moleman was stuck under a fallen tree in their yard, which they fail to notice. In the morning, they keep watching the show while Hans is taken into an ambulance.

The show is cancelled due to government stopping funding the show, before Maggie can completely learn to use sign language, so the family attempts to teach her themselves. When Maggie begins to use sign language on her own, Marge tries to tell the family about Maggie's development, only to find them uninterested and playing on their devices, so Marge stops them and limits their time on the devices to half an hour a week for everyone.

When Homer, Bart and Lisa cheat by having the Wise Guy revert their screentime, Marge puts the devices away entirely. Without their devices, Homer becomes an expert in word jumble puzzles, Bart starts to use his imagination and recovers a rocket belonging to Jimbo and Dolph from the school's roof, and Lisa rediscovers the joy of finding books manually.

Meanwhile, Marge cannot find recipes on her books and fails to get help from Luigi. When the family returns home they find her in her closet with her phone and laptop, finding out she is the addicted one. Finally admitting she has a problem, she signs herself and the family up for a month at the Screen Addiction Rehab Center.

The next day they arrive at the center, finding out it is a paradise. The owner Dr. Lund shows them various activities. They start recovering from their addictions, but discover the workers all use computers, sending spam mails after stealing patients' accounts. In addition, the family signed a non-disclosure contract, which also prevents them from being able to leave the center.

At night, the family work together, using sign language for communication, and manage to stealthily escape the center undetected and get a ride home on Jimbo and Dolph's makeshift rocket. The next day, Lund is arrested by the police for his scams and Lund offers to help Chief Wiggum with his compulsive overeating.

== Reception ==
=== Viewing figures ===
The episode earned a 0.5 rating and was watched by 1.63 million viewers, which was the most watched show on Fox that night.

=== Critical response ===
Dennis Perkins of The A.V. Club gave this episode a B−, stating that “Alas, there’s not enough else to recommend ‘Screenless,’ as the Simpsons’ individual journeys through the hell of online withdrawal are short-changed and unsatisfying. Homer gets good at newspaper jumbles, which has one truncated but lovely little montage sequence where the glimpse of Homer J. Simpson recognizing some hidden talent inside himself is set to evocative music...Lisa briefly rediscovers the musty, dusty, opossum-infested joys of the library’s neglected card catalog. Bart, like Homer, has the merest hint of a personal arc when he alone among his phone-tapping peers spies a forgotten toy rocket on the school roof and, retrieving it, rediscovers his atrophied imagination.”.

Tony Sokol of Den of Geek gave this episode 3.5 out of 5 stars. He praised how the show can continue to comment on modern problems and depict how families can still interact in the same room.
