= Frink Gets Testy =

- The Simpsons episode
- Episode no.: Season 29; Episode 11
- Directed by: Chris Clements
- Written by: Dan Vebber
- Production code: XABF04
- Original air date: January 14, 2018

Guest appearances
- Valerie Harper as Proctor Clarkeson; Maurice LaMarche as Orson Welles

Episode features
- Chalkboard gag: "Strangling is not an effective parenting tool" (written by Homer)
- Couch gag: The couch gives birth to a baby couch, with Dr. Hibbert performing the operation, Homer tries to hold it in his hands but drops it on the carpet. Maggie then sits down on it.

Episode chronology
← Previous "Haw-Haw Land"	Next → "Homer Is Where the Art Isn't"
- The Simpsons season 29

"Frink Gets Testy" is the eleventh episode of the twenty-ninth season of the American animated television series The Simpsons, and the 629th episode of the series overall. The episode was directed by Chris Clements and written by Dan Vebber. It aired in the United States on Fox on January 14, 2018.

In this episode, Professor Frink devises a test to find who is worthy to accompany Mr. Burns on his doomsday ark. Valerie Harper and Maurice LaMarche guest starred. The episode received mixed reviews.

== Plot ==
A classic documentary hosted by Orson Welles about Nostradamus and his predictions for the future, including one concerning World War III, causes Mr. Burns to become alarmed for the future of Springfield. With Smithers' help, he convenes a meeting of the local chapter of Mensa International to ask their advice on constructing a "Doomsday Ark", intended to save the city's most valuable individuals. The Mensa members suggest that everyone be given an IQ test to choose the passengers, but Professor Frink interrupts to recommend an alternative test he has devised that can measure people's "Personal Value Quotient" (PVQ) on a scale of 1 to 500. The test is made mandatory for all residents.

Six weeks later, the results are reported during a news broadcast. Lisa scores 475, but is shocked to learn that Ralph Wiggum has bested her by one point. Marge scores 311, Homer scores 265, while Bart has only scored 1. When Marge indignantly storms into Frink's office and insists that Bart is not worthless, Frink discovers that he inadvertently mixed up Bart's and Homer's test results due to Homer's terrible handwriting. People all over town begin to ridicule Homer for his low test score and take advantage of him, but Marge decides to help him better himself. She concentrates on Homer's penmanship, and he eventually improves to the point of being able to write her a romantic note in longhand. Marge is touched by the gesture and the fact that Homer has almost passed out from the effort of completing it. After hearing Marge's touched reaction, a barely awake Homer drinks a bottle of bourbon to help himself fall asleep.

After talking with Welles in a dream, Burns speeds up construction on the Ark and puts Homer, Lenny, and Carl to work on it. Lisa begins following Ralph around school and town to figure out why his PVQ is higher than hers, without success. They reach the Ark construction site, where Ralph repeatedly avoids severe injury through sheer luck. Frustrated, Lisa tells Frink of what she has seen. Frink adds ten points to her PVQ so that she will not reveal the flaws in his testing process.

Once the Ark is finished, Burns brings the PVQ test's top scorers on board and tells them that they will be his slaves. Annoyed at the deception, all of them leave through a hatch that has been left unlocked. Burns locks himself in and decides to pilot the Ark by himself. As Smithers winds up stranded outside, having left to fetch Burns' slippers, Burns ends up being strangled by one of the Ark's maintenance robots.

== Production ==
Maurice LaMarche reprised his role as Orson Welles. He previously played Welles in the eighteenth season episode "Treehouse of Horror XVII."

== Cultural references ==
Homer attempts to watch Brooklyn Bound, a fictional film by Noah Baumbach, but is forced to watch The Nut Job 3: The Squirreling, a fictional sequel to The Nut Job 2: Nutty by Nature. He also tries to watch Shakespeare in the Park but opts for Sesame Street on Ice.

== Reception ==
=== Critical response ===
Dennis Perkins of The A.V. Club gave this episode a B−, stating, "I’ll say one thing for ‘Frink Gets Testy’: It's unsatisfying in a different way than usual for latter-day Simpsons. Starting out with some truly fine gags and a setup worthy of a classic, high-concept Simpsons episode, it had me laughing—out loud, even—far more than any episode has in a while. And then the realization that it had gone into its third ad break with all its plot threads still hanging made me groan (although not out loud). There clearly just wasn't enough time to pay off some promising and enjoyable storylines, and, indeed, the rushed conclusion perfunctorily wrapped them up, leaving me—and here's the unusual part—wishing it were longer. (I could actually see this extended into a second feature film, if there were to be such a thing.)"

Tony Sokol of Den of Geek gave the episode 3.5 out of 5 stars. He highlights Lisa and Bart's reactions to their rankings and the commentary by Orson Welles.

=== Viewing figures ===
"Frink Gets Testy" scored a 3.3 rating with an 11 share and was watched by 8.04 million people, making it Fox's highest rated show of the night.

=== Themes and analysis ===
Anna Maria Bounds cites this episode as an examination of high net worth preppers who face a dilemma of who should be saved, stating:

The Simpsons episode, "Frink Gets Testy" (2018), is an absurd yet insightful exploration of a HNW person's difficulty in try to escape a disaster scenario. ... With the limited space offered by escaping to a hideaway or by retreating to a safe room, the real question being asked might be: "Who is useful to me and, therefore, worth saving?"
