= Gorillas on the Mast =

- The Simpsons episode
- Episode no.: Season 31; Episode 5
- Directed by: Matthew Nastuk
- Written by: Max Cohn
- Production code: YABF20
- Original air date: November 3, 2019

Guest appearance
- Jane Goodall as herself

Episode features
- Couch gag: A dart board is placed on the couch, and the Simpson family is thrown at it for target practice. Homer is last, yelling "make way", before being thrown against the wall instead and exclaiming "D'oh!"

Episode chronology
← Previous "Treehouse of Horror XXX"	Next → "Marge the Lumberjill"
- The Simpsons season 31

"Gorillas on the Mast" is the fifth episode of the thirty-first season of the American animated television series The Simpsons, and the 667th episode overall. It aired in the United States on Fox on November 3, 2019. The episode was directed by Matthew Nastuk and written by Max Cohn.

In this episode, Bart and Lisa free animals from captivity while Homer buys a boat. Primatologist Jane Goodall voiced herself. The episode received middling reviews.

== Plot ==
The Simpson family visits the Aquatraz Water Park, where Lisa notices how unhappy the animals are behind glass and Homer notices how much fun boat owners have. He remembers how much he wanted a boat as a kid while fishing with his father. A boat salesman notices Homer watching the boats and convinces him to buy one.

Homer takes the family on a ride on his boat, named the "Something's Fishy", and even Marge agrees it was a good idea to buy it. Homer takes Grampa on the boat after, but when they return to the pier, the boat starts sinking, needing repairs. Homer offers to share the boat, and the expenses to fix it, with Lenny and Carl. Eventually, Homer starts co-owning the boat with even more people, until the boat sinks due to the weight.

Meanwhile, Bart, Lisa, and Groundskeeper Willie go back to the water park to free the whale, and Bart decides he likes altruism. Afterwards, Bart and Milhouse go to the Springfield Zoo to free more animals and they let loose a gorilla named Lolo who can use sign language to sign five words: "friend", "enemy", "kill", "vodka", and "Seinfeld". Lolo goes on a rampage while Milhouse narrowly escapes getting eaten by two tigers. Bart calls Lisa for help since the police are useless at capturing Lolo. Lolo rampages at the Springfield Elementary School but Lisa calms him down. Lisa takes Lolo home to help him go back to a life of freedom and takes him to Dr. Jane Goodall at the Pennsylvania Ape Reserve. Goodall renames him "Popo".

== Production ==
This is the first episode of the series written by Max Cohn. His writing was shown to the producers by a friend, and he met two executive producers while visiting Los Angeles. He was invited to pitch ideas, and the producers were interested in an idea about Homer buying a boat and becoming stranded on a garbage patch. After the creatives mapped out the episode, Cohn returned to New York and wrote the script. The table read occurred six months later, and the episode aired a year afterwards.

Primatologist Jane Goodall appeared as herself. Goodall was previously spoofed in the twelfth season episode "Simpson Safari" with the character Dr. Joan Bushwell.

== Reception ==
=== Viewing figures ===
The episode earned a 0.8 rating with a 4 share and was watched by 2.02 million viewers, which was the most watched show on Fox that night.

=== Critical response ===
Dennis Perkins of The A.V. Club gave the episode a C stating, “Lisa frees a killer whale. Bart frees a gorilla. Homer buys a boat. Bare story bones. Nothing wrong with that. The Simpsons’ world is made up of outlandish situations rendered possible, sometimes even plausible, by animation and the show's forgiving rules of reality. Some of the best episodes sound just as sparse in outline. Homer goes to space. Springfield gets a monorail. Lisa and Bart thwart a supervillain's plot to drown Springfield."

Tony Sokol of Den of Geek gave the episode a 2.5 out of 5, stating that the episode "doesn't truly shine. There are a lot of very funny lines and gags, but nothing which truly distinguishes it as comic gold. This isn't the fault of Lisa's social justice warmongering. Kent Brockman offers cutting commentary after Lolo wreaks havoc on Springfield saying, 'The police, as always, are useless.' Which cuts to a scene where Springfield's bluest kill a perfectly harmless balloon. The water is only tepid and while good gags are on tap, they are not premium blend."
