= Planet of the Bass =

2023 song by Kyle Gordon

Single by DJ Crazy Times and Ms. Biljana Electronica

from the album Kyle Gordon Is Great
- Released: August 15, 2023
- Genre: Eurodance; comedy; parody
- Length: 3:20
- Label: BMG
- Songwriter: Kyle Gordon
- Producers: Brooks Allison; Jamie Siegel

Kyle Gordon singles chronology
"Planet of the Bass" (2023)	"Ugliest Girl on the Beach" (2023)

Music video
- "Planet of the Bass" on YouTube

"Planet of the Bass" is a 1990s-style Eurodance parody song written by American comedian Kyle Gordon, released on August 15, 2023. He performed it under the pseudonym DJ Crazy Times, with American singer-songwriter Chrissi Poland contributing guest vocals under the name Ms. Biljana Electronica. Brooks Allison, a sketch writer for The Tonight Show Starring Jimmy Fallon, and Jamie Siegel served as producers.

"Planet of the Bass" was the lead single released for Kyle Gordon Is Great, Gordon's debut album, released in early 2024.

== Background and composition ==
The song was created as a parody of 1990s European dance music. The song contains lyrics intentionally written in broken English, such as "When the rhythm is glad / There is nothing to be sad", and "Life, it never die / Women are my favorite guy".

The female vocals are provided by Chrissi Poland, credited as Ms. Biljana Electronica. In the music videos, Electronica is mainly portrayed by actress Audrey Trullinger along with Mara Olney and Sabrina Brier.

== Release ==
Gordon and Trullinger filmed a short video for the song in New York City's Oculus building before they were asked to leave by the police for filming in the area. The video was uploaded on July 28, 2023, and it soon went viral on Twitter, TikTok and Tumblr. Gordon advanced the song's official release date from August 22 to August 15.

On August 3, Gordon uploaded another snippet of the song, this time with Mara Olney playing Biljana over the same vocal track. This, as well as Olney's "less nostalgic fashion and relatively muted expressions", was faced with backlash from fans who demanded Trullinger's return. That same night, Gordon premiered the full song live at Mood Ring, a queer bar in Brooklyn. On August 7, a third snippet was uploaded, featuring TikTok personality Sabrina Brier portraying Biljana. Gordon told NBC News that the videos with Trullinger and Olney were inspired by a common trope in 1990s Eurodance music videos, in which the singers would be replaced by various models. In an interview with The Washington Post, Trullinger said that she initially thought she had been replaced after learning that Gordon was filming the version with Olney. After both versions were released, she called the stunt "so funny" and praised Olney for being "fantastic and hilarious".

In the full-length official video for "Planet of the Bass," Electronica was again portrayed by Trullinger with minor appearances by Olney and Brier in the role on a computer screen.

== Reception ==
Soon after the release of the snippet of the song, Mark Harris, former executive at Entertainment Weekly, praised the clip, saying that had the song been released in 1997, they would've been given a whole page with a photo shoot in Entertainment Weekly. The band Aqua commented: "Wait, is this play about us???", on Gordon's initial TikTok clip of the song, referencing a line spoken by Euphoria character Maddy Perez. Gordon named Aqua as one of the inspirations for the track, and credited the hype around their 1997 song "Barbie Girl" (due to the release of the film Barbie) for his song's popularity. Miles Klee of Rolling Stone described the song as a "landmark achievement" and a party anthem.

On August 16, Gordon and Trullinger were invited by the Jonas Brothers to perform the song in Boston during their world tour. The song debuted at number 46 on Billboard's Hot Dance/Electronic Songs chart, with 736,000 streams in the US.

Gordon, Trullinger and Poland appeared in a 2024 episode of The Simpsons, with Gordon reprising the role of DJ Crazy Times and Poland as Biljana Electronica.

On February 26, 2024, in Fortnite Battle Royale, an emote using the Planet of the Bass song was released under the name "Interstellar Bass".

== Charts ==
Chart (2023)	Peak position
US Hot Dance/Electronic Songs (Billboard)	46
