= Bobby, It's Cold Outside =

- The Simpsons episode
- Episode no.: Season 31; Episode 10
- Directed by: Steven Dean Moore
- Written by: John Frink; Jeff Westbrook
- Production code: ZABF01
- Original air date: December 15, 2019

Guest appearances
- Scott Bakula as himself; Steve Ballmer as himself; Kelsey Grammer as Sideshow Bob

Episode features
- Couch gag: The couch is placed as a Christmas tree ornament, and the Simpson family is placed on it, but when Homer is placed, the tree falls and Homer exclaims "D'oh ho! Ho!"

Episode chronology
← Previous "Todd, Todd, Why Hast Thou Forsaken Me?"	Next → "Hail to the Teeth"
- The Simpsons season 31

"Bobby, It's Cold Outside" is the 10th episode of the thirty-first season of the American animated television series The Simpsons, and the 672nd episode overall. It aired in the United States on Fox on December 15, 2019. The episode was written by Jeff Westbrook & John Frink and was directed by Steven Dean Moore.

In this episode, Bart and Sideshow Bob team up to determine who is stealing packages from the town residents. Actor Scott Bakula and businessman Steve Ballmer appeared as themselves. The episode received mixed reviews.

== Plot ==
Five weeks before Christmas, Lenny orders his Christmas gift online and receives it two days later from UPS, but someone immediately steals it. Meanwhile, Sideshow Bob is working as a lighthouse keeper and is visited by Cassandra Patterson, a neighbor. She tells him she mentioned him in town, and Bob knows he let his guard down around her when two men come visiting, but they offer him a job at the Springfield Mall as Santa Claus. Later, more people are robbed of their delivered gifts.

The Simpsons visit Santa's village. Bart skips the line to see Santa, only to realize that it is secretly Sideshow Bob. Bob starts strangling Bart, but he stops in order to not break character. Later, when a plan to trick the robbers with gunpowder fails for Lenny, Lenny writes "SB" with his blood. When the news is reported, Homer thinks that SB means Selma Bouvier and she is arrested, freeing the recently held suspects Scott Bakula, Steve Ballmer, and Sandra Bullock.

Bart suspects Bob due to the latter's nickname also being 'SB', but Bob agrees to help Bart find the culprit by concealing himself in a box that is placed on the porch. The thief arrives and takes Bob, and the family follows the van to a hangar, where they find out Waylon Smithers and Mr. Burns were the culprits (S is for Smithers, B is for Burns). Lisa correctly guesses that Burns did it because he is depressed, and Burns tells the story of how as a child, he was heartbroken one Christmas. He asked Santa for just a hug and a smile from his parents and they never delivered, sending him to boarding school instead.

Bob as Santa convinces Burns that his harsh upbringing made him the successful man he is today. This convinces Burns and Smithers to return the presents to the town. On Christmas Day, Homer and Marge snuggle together just before the kids open the returned presents, and they go to the basement to enjoy some time together, just after Grampa takes a picture to bless everyone with "Merry Christmas from the Simpsons!".

Back at the lighthouse, Cassandra brings Bob a Christmas present, a rake, and tells Bob that she knows who he is. She asks Bob to kiss her before the two of them sing "Baby, It's Cold Outside" together. She and Bob then sign a "snuggle contract" saying that both of them knew what they were getting into, just after Captain Horatio McCallister crashes into a rock because the lighthouse light was not lit.

At the Springfield International Airport, Burns meets Steve Ballmer, who gives him a pep talk after Burns asks him how he could maintain his optimism. Burns tries to copy his motions but injures himself and Ballmer accompanies him in the ambulance to the hospital.

== Reception ==
=== Viewing figures ===
Leading out of an NFL doubleheader, the episode earned a 1.7 rating with an 8 share and was watched by 4.97 million viewers, which was the most watched show on Fox that night.

=== Critical response ===
Dennis Perkins of The A.V. Club gave this episode a C, stating "'Bobby, It's Cold Outside,' (title referring to one aforementioned credits filler gag) at least sees everyone's favorite ineffective psycho would-be murderer back in town for the holidays. Of all the recurring, non-cast characters, Bob's the one most likely to brighten up my day/any episode, simply due to Kelsey Grammer's obvious joy in the villainous role. (Plus, they always let him sing—put 'Carol Of The Bells' on your Sideshow Bob mix CD.) The never-to-end saga of Robert Underdunk [sic] Terwilliger's bloodlust for the blood of one Bart Simpson stretches all the way back to The Simpsons' 12th-ever episode, and he's been swinging and whiffing hard for some 29 years at this point. Like most recurring characters and bits, Bob's appearances have waxed and waned in comic effectiveness, but, hey, always nice to have Grammer in the house, once more essaying his second-most(?) famous role."

Tony Sokol of Den of Geek gave this episode three and a half stars out of five and said "is a double-stuffed bag for the chimney. It is their annual Christmas episode, and these halls are decked. The episode features evergreen favorite recurring villain Sideshow Bob, who trims his tree with ornaments of bleeding Barts. And it bottoms out with our Springfield's favorite Grinch."
