= Haw-Haw Land =

- The Simpsons episode
- Lisa playing the saxophone with Brendan Beiderbecke
- Episode no.: Season 29; Episode 10
- Directed by: Bob Anderson
- Written by: Tim Long; Miranda Thompson
- Production code: XABF03
- Original air date: January 7, 2018

Guest appearance
- Ed Sheeran as Brendan Biederbecke

Episode chronology
← Previous "Gone Boy"	Next → "Frink Gets Testy"
- The Simpsons season 29

"Haw-Haw Land" is the tenth episode of the twenty-ninth season of the American animated television series The Simpsons, and the 628th episode of the series overall. The episode was directed by Bob Anderson and written by Tim Long and Miranda Thompson. It aired in the United States on Fox on January 7, 2018.

In this episode, Lisa falls for a musician named Brendan, which makes Nelson jealous, while Bart develops an interest in chemistry. Ed Sheeran guest starred as Brendan Biederbecke. The episode received mixed reviews.

The title and the opening musical number spoof La La Land, and the close of the episode spoofs the mistake in announcing that film as the Best Picture winner at the 89th Academy Awards.

== Plot ==
On a rainy day, the Simpson family goes to a STEM conference, where Lisa meets Brendan Beiderbecke (voiced by Ed Sheeran), a boy who is proficient in the piano, and falls in love with him. The bullies are overthrown by Brendan, including Lisa's ex-boyfriend Nelson who tries to impress her musically at Phineas Q. Butterfat's Ice Cream Parlor, starting a conflict in her heart.

Meanwhile, Bart discovers he has an interest in and a talent for chemistry after witnessing chemical reactions. He tries it out on his treehouse with Milhouse where they turn the leaves of the tree into rock candy after Homer and Marge leave. Homer and Marge get worried over Bart, but he seems to be doing good for once, but an accident at school, involving Superintendent Chalmers accidentally drinking a sulfuric acid-laced cup of vodka and losing the tip of his tongue, seems linked to Bart. Bart claims not to know of the incident, but Marge and Homer are unsure.

The family goes to a talent show, where Bart will put on a chemistry demonstration, while Nelson and Brendan perform. Nelson is booed all the way through while Brendan does well. However, he is disqualified for living in West Springfield and is going to be transferred to a school there. After Brendan says goodbye to Lisa, Nelson tells her he is relieved that she didn't choose him, as he needs to focus on his own skills before he can date her. Lisa ends up alone, finding herself enjoying it. As Bart begins his demonstration, the police show up to arrest him for the sulfuric incident. At first conflicted, Marge chooses to believe Bart and assists him in the demonstration, producing a vibrant and safe visual. This proves that Bart is innocent, as Willie admits to spiking the vodka in an attempt to murder Principal Skinner. However, as Marge and Bart reconcile, Bart admits that he built a prank into his demonstration, which explodes and fills the school with pink foam.

In the final scene at the talent show's after-party, while Willie spikes the punch with the Polonium hydride(H2PO), Marge apologizes to the viewers stating that this episode was supposed to parody Moonlight, not La La Land. Homer states that nobody there has seen Moonlight. When Marge offers to show him that movie as they have the DVD, Homer states that he would rather see X-Men: Apocalypse which everyone in the background is interested in seeing, except for Lisa, who'd like to see Moonlight.

== Production ==
The episode is a parody of the 2016 film La La Land. Co-writer Tim Long wanted to write an episode where Nelson sings. When he heard Nelson sing in the sixteenth season episode "Sleeping with the Enemy," Long thought it was crazy but moving, and he want to draw from that pain.

Musician Ed Sheeran was cast as Brendan. Producer Mike Scully heard Sheeran, who has a Blinky tattoo, was interested in appearing on the show, and the producers selected him for this role. Sheeran recorded his lines in England. Executive producer Al Jean described the character as a great musician but condescending to Lisa. Sheeran called the character a "posh English douche." Brendan takes the place of Ryan Gosling's role in La La Land. Brendan's last name is a nod to jazz composer Bix Beiderbecke.

== Cultural references ==
The episode ending is a nod to an error made at the end of the 89th Academy Awards. Nelson sings "My Funny Valentine" to Lisa.

== Reception ==
Dennis Perkins of The A.V. Club gave this episode a C+, stating, "Pegging an episode of The Simpsons directly to a specific pop cultural target requires a whole lot more imagination to pull off than ‘Haw-Haw Land’ can muster. The title, bringing in Nelson's catchphrase, is at the top of the cleverness heap here, seeing as how the school bully and one-time Lisa Simpson paramour forms one point in the episode's La La Land love triangle. But if you're going to do a parody of a lavish Hollywood musical love story (and, as the episode tag jokes, accidental momentary Oscar winner), you have to bring a lot more to the enterprise than is on display."

Tony Sokol of Den of Geek gave the episode 3.5 out of 5 stars. He called the episode sweet and predictable but nothing stood out.

"Haw-Haw Land" was watched by 6.95 million viewers with a 2.8 rating and a 9 share, making it Fox's highest-rated show of the night.
