= Two-step =

Two-step or two step may refer to:

== Dance ==
- Two-step (dance move), a dance move used in a wide range of dancing genres
- Country-western two-step, also known as the Texas Two-step
- Nightclub Two Step, also known as the California Two-step
- 2-step (breakdance move), an acrobatic maneuver used in breakdancing
- Two step, a style of moshing which creates a running–in–place motion

== Music ==
- "Two Step" (song), a single released by Dave Matthews Band in 1996
- "2 Step" (song), a single released by Unk in 2007
- "2step" (song), a song released by Ed Sheeran in 2021
- 2-step garage, a subgenre of UK garage music
- "2 Step", a bonus track by Destiny's Child from their 2004 album Destiny Fulfilled
- "Two-Step", a song by Low from their 1999 album Secret Name (album)

== Other ==
- Two Step Cliffs
- Two Step Inn, a country music festival located in Georgetown, Texas
- Two-Step (comics)
- Two Step (film), a 2014 American thriller film
- Euro step, also known as two-step, a basketball move
- Many-banded krait, a species of venomous snake native to Southeast Asia colloquially nicknamed the "two-step snake"
- Texas two-step bankruptcy
