= Dan Vebber =

American writer

Dan Vebber is an American writer best known for his television work on animated shows such as The Simpsons, Space Ghost Coast to Coast, Futurama, Daria, Napoleon Dynamite and American Dad!. He was also a writer on Buffy the Vampire Slayer.

Vebber was nominated for Emmy Awards in 2009, 2011, 2013 and 2014, winning an Emmy for Outstanding Animated Program in 2011.

Vebber is a 1992 graduate of the University of Wisconsin-Madison, where he wrote for and contributed cartoons to The Daily Cardinal.. Afterwards, he was a writer and editor for The Onion in the early 1990s.

== Filmography ==
=== The Simpsons episodes ===
- "The Book Job" (2011)
- "Lisa the Veterinarian" (2016)
- "Frink Gets Testy" (2018)
- "101 Mitigations" (with Rob LaZebnik & Brian Kelley) (2019)
- "Thanksgiving of Horror" (2019)
- "Bart the Bad Guy" (2020)
- "The Last Barfighter" (2021)
- "Boyz N the Highlands" (2022)
- "Step Brother from the Same Planet" (2022)
- "McMansion & Wife" (2023)
- "Treehouse of Horror XXXIV" (Lout Break) (2023)
- "Bart's Brain" (2024)
- "Treehouse of Horror XXXV" (The Fall of the House of Monty) (2024)
- "The Flandshees of Innersimpson" (2025)
- "The Children's Book Job" (2026)

=== Futurama episodes ===
- “The Birdbot of Ice-Catraz” (2001)
- “Love and Rocket” (2002)
- “The Route of All Evil” (2002)
- “Obsoletely Fabulous” (2003)
- “A Clockwork Origin” (2010)
- “Mobius Dick” (2011)
- “Cold Warriors” (2011)
- “The Thief of Baghead” (2012)
- “Fun on a Bun” (2012)
- “The Inhuman Torch” (2013)

=== American Dad! episodes ===
- “Roger Codger” (2005)
- “Not Particularly Desperate Housewife” (2005)
- "The American Dad After School Special" (2006)
- “A.T. The Abusive Terrestrial” (2006)
- “Meter Made” (2007)
- “Escape from Pearl Bailey” (2008)
- “Crotchwalkers” (2013)
- “Honey, I’m Homeland” (2014)

=== Napoleon Dynamite episodes ===
- “Pedro vs. Deb” (2012)

=== Bordertown episodes ===
- “High School Football” (2016)

=== Buffy The Vampire Slayer episodes ===
- "Lovers Walk" (1998)
- "The Zeppo" (1999)

=== Daria episodes ===
- “Jake of Hearts” (1999)
- “I Loathe a Parade” (2000)
- “Art Burn” (2001)

=== Space Ghost Coast to Coast episodes ===
- “Switcheroo” (1997)
- “Needledrop” (1997)
