= Uter =

Uter is a surname. Notable people with the surname include:

- Adrian Uter (born 1984), Jamaican basketball player
- Samuel Uter (born 1885), Jamaican cricketer

== See also ==
- Üter Zörker, The Simpsons character
